= Famine in Sudan =

Famine in Sudan may refer to:

- 1988 Sudan famine, a large humanitarian disaster in Bahr el Ghazal which killed around 250,000 people.
- 1993 Sudan famine, during civil war and political unrest
- 1998 Sudan famine, caused mainly by human rights abuses and drought
- Famine in Sudan (2024–present), during the Sudanese civil war (2023–present)

== See also ==
- Food insecurity and famine in South Sudan, continuous food insecurity with a short period of declared famine
