= Refugees and internally displaced people of Sudan =

Displaced Sudanese
Total population
- 12 million

Regions with significant populations
- Sudan: 7.7–9.58 million
- Egypt: 503,993
- Chad: 304,650
- Ethiopia: 50,000
- Uganda: 33,438
- Jordan: 6,120
- Kenya: 3,449

Refugees and internally displaced people of Sudan are people from Sudan who have been forced to leave their homes, either by seeking refuge outside the country or by being displaced within Sudan. In recent history, Sudan has been the stage for prolonged conflicts and civil wars, as well as environmental changes, namely desertification. These forces have resulted not only in violence and famine but also the forced migration of large numbers of the Sudanese population, both inside and outside the country's borders. Given the expansive geographic territory of Sudan, and the regional and ethnic tensions and conflicts, much of the forced migration in Sudan has been internal. Yet, these populations are not immune to similar issues that typically accompany refugeedom, including economic hardship and providing themselves and their families with sustenance and basic needs. With the creation of South Sudan as an independent state, some people who had previously been considered internally displaced within Sudan could instead come to be classified as cross-border refugees.

== History ==
Deliberate displacement has been a recurring feature of Sudan’s history, used by successive authorities to advance political, economic, and military objectives. Such practices can be traced back to the nineteenth century and continued under both colonial rule and post-independence governments, often justified on grounds of security, development, or urban planning. As a result, entire communities have repeatedly been uprooted during periods of conflict as well as in times formally described as peace.

=== First Sudanese Civil War ===
The First Sudanese Civil War (1955-1972) in southern Sudan caused widespread displacement and the collapse of basic services, driving large numbers of civilians to seek refuge both internally and across borders. Estimates indicated that around 500,000 people were internally displaced during this war, many of them living outside towns and formal settlements. (Note: Source says: "hid in the bush" which is interpreted as internally displaced civilians who fled to rural, forested, or remote areas, outside towns or formal settlements.) In addition, approximately 180,000 southern Sudanese sought refuge in neighbouring countries, including about 74,000 in Uganda, 60,000 in Zaire, 20,000 in Ethiopia, and roughly 21,000 in the Central African Republic.

In host countries, refugees were primarily settled in planned rural settlements developed with support from UNHCR. Over time, many of these settlements developed basic infrastructure and services and were intended to promote a degree of self sufficiency. This period of large scale displacement eased temporarily following the Addis Ababa Peace Agreement in 1972 that ended the First Sudanese Civil War.

=== Second Sudanese Civil War ===
With the outbreak of the Second Sudanese Civil War (1983-2005), violence in Southern Sudan intensified and security conditions deteriorated. As a result, many Ugandan refugees living in Southern Sudan returned to Uganda, while large numbers of Southern Sudanese also fled across the border into Uganda. As in the first civil war, many people displaced within Southern Sudan did not leave the country but remained internally displaced, often under extremely harsh conditions. During this war, a new conflict erupted in 2003 in Sudan’s western Darfur region. The violence caused hundreds of thousands of civilian deaths and forced millions of people from Darfur to flee both within Sudan and abroad.

This phase formally came to an end in 2005 with the signing of the Comprehensive Peace Agreement, which facilitated the return of internally displaced persons to their places of origin and enabled refugees to return to Sudan.

=== 2023 Sudanese war ===
An ongoing refugee crisis began in Sudan in mid-April 2023 after the outbreak of the Sudanese civil war. As of November 2025, the conflict has forced more than 11.7 million people from their homes, including about 7.26 million displaced within Sudan and a further 4.25 million who have crossed the border, making it the largest displacement crisis in the world. Sudan's war and mass displacement placed additional pressure on neighbouring countries, including Chad, South Sudan, Egypt, Ethiopia, Eritrea, the Central African Republic and Libya, several of which were already facing serious domestic crises before receiving large numbers of refugees. Refugees and migrants in Sudan, including people from Ethiopia and Eritrea who cannot safely return home, also became more vulnerable to smuggling, trafficking and exploitation as they sought routes out of the country through border areas where state control was weak.

== Reasons for fleeing ==
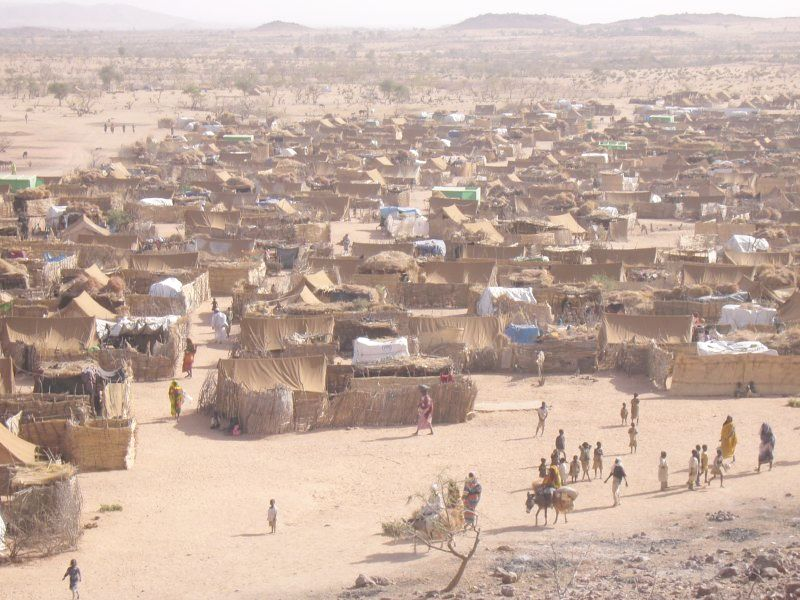
A Darfuri refugee camp in Chad

The movement of populations within and around the territory of modern-day Sudan and its neighbors for trade, opportunity, climatic variations, and conflicts is not unique to recent or contemporary history. But these movements have intensified and become more concentrated for reasons including prolonged civil war, violence between various populations along ethnic and political lines, droughts and subsequent famines in the 1980s, and humanitarian emergencies and famine caused by improper responses to previous crises by international aid organizations. Movements of people are also inherently more problematic across international boundaries, which may be contradictory to natural population flows within the region.

People from Sudan have fled their homes for a range of reasons.

=== Armed conflict ===
Civil wars have been the main cause of displacement from Sudan. These conflicts have displaced millions of people, either to the outskirts of towns within the country or to neighboring states and farther abroad, often amid recurrent violence linked to tribal and ethnic tensions.

=== Famine ===
Famine has also been a major cause of displacement in Sudan. Sudan has experienced several major famines, including in 1988, 1993 and 1998 during the civil war, when scorched-earth tactics, mass displacement, and damage to farmland and crops contributed to severe food crises. Another major famine began in 2024.

=== Forced conscription ===
Fear of forced conscription is another reason for Sudanese people to flee, and was already described as such in 2014. Since April 2023, forced recruitment by the Rapid Support Forces (RSF) has been reported as a driver of displacement. Since the outbreak of the war in April 2023, the RSF has intensified recruitment campaigns in areas under its control, especially in Darfur, Kordofan, and Gezira State, and has often targeted men and boys through abductions, coercion, and threats. Reports have described people being taken from homes, villages, and camps for internally displaced persons and forced into combat or support roles under threat of execution or torture. Those who refused recruitment or tried to escape faced killings, torture, enforced disappearance, and other reprisals, while communities associated with them were also subjected to looting, torching, sexual violence, and forced displacement. Young males, displaced persons, and people in RSF-held areas were considered especially vulnerable.

== Internally displaced Sudanese ==
Historically, refugee assistance programs in Sudan relied on the definition of a refugee as one who had crossed an international frontier. This definition is increasingly inappropriate worldwide and especially so in Sudanic Africa, where the number of internally displaced persons (IDPs) exceeded the number of refugees.

As of 2016, an estimated 3.2 million Sudanese were IDPs, and another 78,000 were in IDP-like situations. 300,000 of these IDPs were newly displaced in the first months of 2013 due to renewed intertribal conflict. Continuing insecurity, combined with government restrictions on humanitarian access in the Darfur region, South Kordofan, and the Blue Nile States, hampered UNHCR's activities.

In 2021, violence displaced about 442,000 people, more than five times the number recorded in 2020. As of July 2022, more than 3 million internally displaced people were recorded across Darfur's five states, North, Central, South, East and West Darfur. This accounted for 83% of all IDPs in Sudan, whose total displaced population was estimated at 3.7 million. Darfur's overall population was estimated at about 11 million. Darfur has been a major centre of conflict and displacement in Sudan since 2003. Long-standing inequalities between the country's political centre, including Khartoum, and peripheral regions such as Darfur have shaped both earlier conflicts and the current war. Although the latest war began in Khartoum, Darfur and other peripheral areas have suffered heavily, both as places people flee from and as places hosting displaced people. The renewed spread of fighting into Darfur in 2023 forced more people to flee.

Before April 2023, the number of IDPs were estimated at 3.8 million.

Following the outbreak of the 2023 Sudan conflict, by November 2025 the number of IDPs had increased to 7.26 million.

=== Displacement sites ===
==== Zamzam camp ====
The Zamzam camp was one of the largest IDP camps in Sudan, located 15 kilometres (9.3 mi) south of El Fasher, North Darfur. It was established in 2004 to accommodate the massive influx of people displaced by the war in Darfur. Since the outbreak of the Sudanese civil war in 2023, conditions in the camp have deteriorated severely, with a catastrophic malnutrition crisis, famine-like situations and high child mortality. Experts described the crisis as man-made and preventable. By 2024, the camp housed approximately 500,000 displaced individuals.

Since April 2024, the Rapid Support Forces (RSF) repeatedly attacked Zamzam and Abu Shouk camps, leading to a massacre. On 13 April 2025, the RSF seized control of the camp, forcing its 400,000 residents to flee again. Many fled towards Tawila, travelling for many hours or days with little or no water and food, arriving there severely dehydrated, malnourished and traumatised. Later reports documented sexual and gender-based violence during the flight. The RSF converted the camp into a military base.

==== Tawila ====
Tawila, a town and a locality in North Darfur State about 60 kilometers west of El Fasher, became a major site in the Darfur conflict after fighting began in 2003. In February 2004, Janjaweed attacks and later seizure of the town by the Sudan Liberation Army caused residents to flee to El Fasher and nearby camps, while Tawila was looted and left almost completely destroyed.

Camps for internally displaced people developed around Tawila nearby and later became more permanent settlements. After the seizure by the Rapid Support Forces of Zamzam camp in April 2025, hundreds of thousands of people fled there, creating a major humanitarian crisis marked by severe shortages of food, water, sanitation, shelter and healthcare. Further displacement followed the El Fasher massacre in October 2025, and by June 2026, the wider Tawila area hosted about 715,000 internally displaced people.

==== El Obeid ====
During the Sudanese civil war and the resulting displacement crisis, camps for internally displaced persons (IDPs) were established in El Obeid. One of the two largest camps is the Al Mina Al Bari IDP camp, also known as Unified Camp, located in the northeast of the city at a site that used to serve as a bus station for El Obeid. As of May 2026, the IDP camp housed around 30,000 displaced persons. Repeated RSF attacks killed and injured people, while siege-like conditions left those in and around El Obeid facing shortages of food, water, fuel, medicine and other essential goods. By July 2026, approximately 105,000 internally displaced persons were living in and around El Obeid, which had more than 500,000 residents.

== Host countries ==
=== Egypt ===
Sudanese migration to Egypt has a long history, driven by the search for safety as well as economic opportunities. Sudanese refugees began arriving in Egypt after the outbreak of the First Sudanese Civil War in 1955. Egypt served as an appealing place of refuge for many of these displaced people, owing both to the close historical ties between the two countries and to Egypt’s fairly well developed economy and education system.

Conditions in Egypt for Sudanese refugees were challenging. Many were not formally recognized as refugees. Housing costs were high, legal employment opportunities were difficult to secure, and access to health care was limited. The education system was overburdened and inadequate.

=== South Sudan ===
By January 2025, more than one million people had fled the war in Sudan to seek refuge in neighbouring South Sudan. Over 770,000 people had reportedly fled through the Joda crossing on South Sudan’s northern border with Sudan in the 21 months preceding January 2025.

By November 2025, there was severe food insecurity and high levels of malnutrition amid ongoing conflict and displacement in South Sudan. Recurrent flooding had disrupted livelihoods and agricultural production. The continued arrivals from Sudan, alongside returning South Sudanese nationals, placed additional pressure on already strained markets, services, and natural resources, while a prolonged economic crisis sharply reduced household purchasing power. These conditions were further aggravated by disease outbreaks, limited access to health care, and inadequate water, sanitation, and hygiene services.

=== Kenya ===
In 2009, an estimated 400,000 Sudanese refugees lived in Kenya.

Kakuma is the site of a UNHCR refugee camp in Kenya.

=== Ethiopia ===
Ethiopia shelters about 70,000 refugees from Sudan, most of whom live in refugee camps in the Benishangul-Gumuz and Gambela Regions.

=== Uganda ===
By October 2025, more than 91,563 Sudanese refugees were officially registered in the country.

=== Israel ===
Beginning in 2006, thousands of Sudanese asylum seekers crossed into Israel from Egypt after fleeing conflict in Sudan and deteriorating conditions in their first country of asylum. Their status in Israel has remained precarious, marked by restrictive asylum policies, low recognition rates, periods of detention, and reliance on temporary protection and employment practices that persist despite a formal ban on hiring Sudanese asylum seekers.

=== Australia ===
In 2007, an estimated 23,000 Sudanese refugees lived in Australia.

== Aid ==
=== Issues ===
Due to the shortages in UNHCR assistance to Sudanese refugees, some Church groups have opened learning centers for refugee children. Furthermore, churches also offer training programs for adult refugees, provide food rations to families, in addition to financial assistance, health services, and job placement. With respect to those Sudanese living in shantytowns in Greater Khartoum or in other urban areas of Africa and the Middle East, remittances provided by kin resettledin Western countries have become an essential part of the overall income needed to meet daily subsistence and other critical needs. Urban refugees’ reliance on cash assistance from abroad is seen as a unique situation since there are few NGOs and humanitarian-based support mechanisms available to adequately meet the needs of refugees in Cairo, Beirut, Damascus, and elsewhere on Sudan's periphery.

=== Gender issues ===
In their communities, Sudanese women play a substantial economic role, as the inhabitants of the South depend on agriculture, grazing, fishing, and hunting. When forced to migrate to the capital Khartoum, women pick up marginal work that brings in little income and exposes them to the risk of arrest by authorities. Displaced women often sell tea or liquor, but since the sale of alcohol is illegal, this can lead to imprisonment. Displaced women also suffer in ways that men do not, and in the shantytowns and government-run camps around Khartoum, women continue to suffer violations of their rights and assaults on their bodily integrity.

In Egypt, many southern Sudanese women have entered the Egyptian workforce to support their families. As some men have assumed familial roles like food preparation and childcare, they have become sensitized to the difficulties women experience. Men, however, are uncomfortable with this role reversal and tend to emphasize the negative consequences it has on child development and the husband-wife relationship.

== Durable solutions ==
=== Resettlement ===
Whereas earlier waves of Sudanese refugees found asylum first in neighbouring countries, contemporary Sudanese refugees use these countries as a springboard for resettlement in a third country. Some refugees find themselves moving between different countries in the region in order to increase their chances for resettlement.

=== Repatriation ===
Repatriation of Sudanese refugees remains difficult given the ongoing conflict and tensions in Darfur and South Sudan. The Comprehensive Peace Agreement (CPA) between the Government of Sudan and the Sudan People's Liberation Movement is viewed as the principal determinant of peace and stability in Sudan. This pact paved the way for the return of thousands of Sudanese refugees from neighboring countries.

In South Sudan, armed groups like Uganda's Lord's Resistance Army (LRA) and intertribal clashes have produced increased levels of violence. The patterns of violence point to a clear targeting of women and children. This presents a definite obstacle to repatriation. In Darfur, insecurity, land occupation, and crop destruction continue to generate fresh displacement and prevent returns.

== Hosting refugees ==
During the civil war between Eritrea and Ethiopia, many traveled to Sudan as refugees. These camps had a very harsh environment, medicine and clean water were scarce. Some survived on other nations. (e.g. UN Rations). As of 2016, there were 232,000 South Sudanese refugees in Sudan.

== See also ==
- Deportation of Eritreans from Sudan
- El Fasher refugee crisis
- Sudanese Civil War (disambiguation)
- Lost Boys of Sudan
- 1998 Sudan famine
- Refugees of South Sudan
