= Famine in Sudan (2024–present) =

- Country: Sudan
- Location: Khartoum; Darfur; Kordofan; Refugee camps in Chad
- Period: April 2023 – present
- Total deaths: 522,000+; More than 700,000 children with acute malnutrition, with 522,000 likely dying
- Death rate: 1.5 – 2.4 per 10,000/day in Zamzam camp; 1.1 – 3.6 under-five children per 10,000/day in Zamzam camp; 100 deaths per day in Sudan
- Refugees: 777,330 to Chad; 695,143 to South Sudan; 133,049 to Ethiopia; 31,600 to the Central African Republic
- Causes: Sudanese civil war (2023–present) (including war, humanitarian aid blockade, siege, looting)
- Relief: USD$315 million in humanitarian aid from the United States USD$70 million in humanitarian aid from UAE
- Effect on demographics: 20% of population in "emergency food situation"
- Preceded by: 1998 Sudan famine

Throughout 2024, the population of Sudan suffered from severe malnutrition and famine conditions as a result of the Sudanese civil war beginning in 2023, primarily in Darfur, Kordofan, and neighboring refugee-taking nations such as Chad. On 1 August, the Global Famine Review Committee released a report officially declaring that it was possible that IPC Phase 5 famine conditions were ongoing in North Darfur near Al-Fashir and there was a high risk of similar conditions throughout internally displaced persons (IDP) camps. Human rights groups said famine conditions in Sudan had been worsened by the Rapid Support Forces looting cities and destroying harvests, while the Sudanese army restricted humanitarian aid deliveries by blocking food shipments into RSF-controlled areas, severely limiting access to life-saving assistance.

The Sudan Doctors Union estimated in January 2025 that 522,000 children had died due to malnutrition. Additionally, the United Nations reported that, during the war, Sudan "endured a 500% increase in verified cases of killings, sexual violence and recruitment into armed groups." In September 2025, the United Nations' World Food Program reported that 24.6 million people suffered from acute hunger and 2 million faced famine or risk of famine. By November 2025, the conflict caused nearly 12 million people to be forcibly displaced, both inside Sudan and across its borders.

== Background ==
Prior to the 2024 Sudan famine, Sudan has experienced two previous famines. These were caused by scorched earth military tactics throughout the civil war that caused the displacement of thousands which led to erosion of the earth and native crops. These famines taking place in 1993 and 1998 both set a precedent and introduced a weakness into the farming and food chain of Sudan that would allow the 2024 famine to attack with severity. As a result of the Sudanese civil war, supplies such as food and water were becoming "extremely acute."

Widespread violence since the outbreak of the war severely disrupted food systems across Sudan. Markets and food-processing facilities were destroyed by explosive weapons and arson, and large-scale looting targeted markets, food aid and livestock. Civilians were attacked in and around marketplaces and on routes used to access them. Blockades cut supply chains and hindered the delivery of humanitarian food assistance, while insecurity prevented access to agricultural land. The combination of prolonged violence and severe restrictions on humanitarian operations contributed directly to the emergence of famine conditions in several areas of Sudan in 2024.

=== Starvation as a method of warfare ===
In March 2026, The Guardian reported that researchers at Yale's Humanitarian Research Lab had identified 41 farming communities in North Darfur that were attacked between March and June 2024. The Yale report described the RSF's systematic destruction of farming communities, livestock enclosures, and the residents of agrarian villages that had been an important food source for El Fasher. Over the 10-week period examined, the RSF attacked 41 rural farming communities, in some cases more than once, across some of Darfur's most fertile land. The attacks appeared aimed at dismantling local food production before the RSF siege of El Fasher, which began in late April 2024 and ended in October 2025. Legal experts cited by The Guardian argued that the pattern of village destruction, damage to farming infrastructure and livestock enclosures, and the displacement of farmers provided strong evidence that the RSF had used starvation as a method of warfare.

=== Looting ===
In May 2023, the World Food Programme said that more than $13 million worth of food aid destined for Sudan had been looted in the twenty days since the fighting broke out. The looting of the WFP's warehouses in El-Obeid on 1 June led to the loss of food aid meant to feed 4.4 million people. On 25 July, Humanitarian Coordinator Clementine Nkweta-Salami said attacks on humanitarian facilities had led to more than 50 warehouses looted, 82 offices ransacked, and over 200 vehicles stolen.

== Food shortage ==
As of 18 June 2024, 25.6 million people were reportedly suffering from acute food shortages. Of these, 756,000 people faced "catastrophic levels of hunger." This was due to many citizens who relied on food rations from the World Food Programme (WFP) having their daily calories reduced by close to 20% compared to two months ago due to only 19% of the WFP's funding objective being achieved. Many Sudanese civilians were forced to trade WFP food rations for less balanced and nutritious but more filling food, like white rice.

Contributing reasons for this were cereal production in Darfur and Kordofan falling to 80% below average production in 2023, leading to significant price increases that make food too expensive for most people to subsist on for long periods. According to a U.S. envoy to Sudan, the RSF burned crops, looted warehouses, and restricted border access, which the RSF denied as being due to rogue actors within its ranks and blamed the Sudanese military for aid restrictions. Many refugee camps considerably grew in population due to the increased rate of refugee intake, further exacerbating food shortages and causing supplies to deplete faster. Refugees are often unable to leave the camps to find work or food due to the danger of being captured or killed by the RSF or other allied militias.

In May 2023, the WFP said that $13–14 million worth of food aid destined for Sudan had been looted. The looting of the WFP's warehouses in El-Obeid on 1 June led to the loss of food aid meant to feed 4.4 million people. On 25 July, Humanitarian Coordinator Clementine Nkweta-Salami said attacks on humanitarian facilities had led to more than 50 warehouses looted, 82 offices ransacked, and over 200 vehicles stolen.

The 2023 cereal harvest was reduced to roughly half its normal volume. This dramatic decrease in agricultural activity caused increases in food prices, and the conflict led to infrequent aid convoys. As of 29 March 2024, an army official reported that 70 aid trucks had been stranded in North Kordofan since the previous October. The UN estimated that 25 million people still needed aid, with 5 million facing famine and 18 million enduring "acute food insecurity". Mobile networks being cut for nearly two months compounded the problems for those being helped by remittances from relatives abroad. According to the United Nations, both the SAF and RSF are posing obstacles to food aid because they want to prevent food from getting to areas controlled by each other.

In February 2024, the United Nations estimated that about 700,000 children in Sudan were suffering from acute malnutrition as a result of the war.

Malnutrition causes lower immune system function, leading to greater susceptibility to diseases such as measles, malaria, cholera, and other gastrointestinal diseases. These in turn led to symptoms such as vomiting and diarrhea that further exacerbated malnutrition.

=== Famine confirmation ===
On 1 August 2024, the Global Famine Review Committee officially determined that there were IPC Phase 5 famine conditions—the most severe level of food insecurity on the IPC scale—in the Zamzam camp near Al-Fashir, with plausible evidence of famine occurring in the nearby Al Salam and Abu Shouk camps, and a high risk of similar conditions throughout internally displaced persons (IDP) camps. According to UNICEF, for a famine to be declared, citizens and children must have already begun to "die from hunger and related conditions including malnutrition and infection".

Mid-upper arm circumference (MUAC) reviews conducted by MSF and the State Ministry of Health from late March to early April 2024 showed that about 33.7% of civilians in West Darfur suffered from global acute malnutrition, as well as 29.4% of children tested in the Zamzam IDP camp and 20% in the general Al-Fashir area. Satellite imaging analysis on the Zamzam camp indicated a ~26% faster rate of increase in counted graves between 18 December 2023 and 3 May 2024 relative to a similar period in 2022–2023. At least 64 deaths were determined to be caused by malnutrition or diseases caused or exacerbated by malnutrition in Zamzam camp, with fifteen of the reported deaths being children under five.

On the same day, the Famine Early Warning Systems Network declared a state of famine at the Zamzam IDP camp in Al-Fashir. On 13 August, civilian authorities affiliated with the Sudan People's Liberation Movement–North (SPLM-N) declared a state of famine over parts of South Kordofan, including the Nuba Mountains, and Blue Nile States affecting around three million people. By 22 August, at least 109 deaths from malnutrition had been recorded in the said areas. By 17 October, at least 646 people had died from malnutrition in the Nuba Mountains, while 404 others died in New Fung, Blue Nile State.

On 24 December 2024, the Integrated Food Security Phase Classification (IPC) declared a state of famine over the Abu Shouk and El Salam IDP camps in North Darfur and parts of the Nuba Mountains. The Sudanese government rejected the findings.

By February 2025, the United Nations confirmed a state of famine in the Zamzam, Abu Shouk and Al Salam IDP camps in North Darfur, as well as in two locations in the Western Nuba Mountains, with over 600,000 people at risk of starvation. The World Food Programme (WFP) reported that 80% of emergency food kitchens had shut down due to U.S. aid cuts. In North Darfur, MSF and WFP suspended operations at Zamzam camp, which housed around 500,000 people.

In April 2025, the famine in Sudan had severely affected nearly 25 million people – about half of the country's population. Since the war began, conflict-driven inflation has pushed food prices up by as much as 300% in some regions, worsening already dire living conditions. The rising costs and shortages forced the closure of community kitchens, and some people were left to survive on animal fodder. By May, famine had been confirmed in at least ten areas, with many more on the brink. Nearly four million children under five were acutely malnourished, including more than 770,000 at high risk of death without treatment. Malnutrition left countless children dangerously weak; a severely malnourished child is about twelve times more likely to die from diseases such as diarrhoea and cholera.

By September 2025, seventeen areas in Sudan were experiencing famine or faced an imminent risk of it, mainly in Darfur and the Kordofan regions.

On 25 October 2025, the BBC reported on Jebel Marra, the last area in Sudan controlled by the Sudan Liberation Army Abdulwahid (SLA-AW) faction. Having remained neutral during the national crisis, it is comparatively fertile and productive and could help ease the famine. However, because of fighting and insecurity, the area remains closed and its products cannot reach markets.

In November 2025 the IPC reported "fragile improvements" in overall food security driven in part by conflict stabilization in Khartoum, Gezira and Sennar states. However, its Famine Review Committee reported with "reasonable evidence" that Al-Fashir and Kadugli were in IPC5 famine conditions. Dilling reportedly experienced the same conditions as Kadugli, but a lack of data prevented the IPC from declaring a famine in Dilling. The IPC also said that 20 other areas in Darfur and Kordofan faced the threat of famine. According to the report, about 375,000 people were experiencing a famine in Darfur and Kordofan as of September and another 6.3 million people across Sudan face extreme levels of hunger.

== Impact ==
On 18 June 2024, the UN Director of Operations and Advocacy Edem Wosornu stated that nearly five million people were facing "emergency levels of food insecurity," which included 800,000 vulnerable people in Al-Fashir, North Darfur, including women, children, older adults, and people with disabilities. She reported that "over 2 million people in 41 hunger hotspots" were on the cusp of catastrophic famine and that 7,000 new mothers could die without proper food and medical supplies. Officials from the United States reported that the situation in Sudan was "the world's most severe humanitarian crisis" despite the relatively low amount of media attention it received and that it had the potential to become the worst famine since the 1983–1985 famine in Ethiopia.

Around 3.6 million children were reported to be "acutely malnourished." OCHA reported that there was a significant increase in disease, especially cholera, interacting with the malnutrition these children are suffering from. The Kalma refugee camp reported that 28 children died of malnutrition coupled with disease in two weeks in May and that at least one child died every day from these conditions. Reuters found that 14 Darfur graveyards were expanding quicker than in the second half of 2023, indicating the increased impact malnutrition and disease had on the refugee population. 196 refugee children in Chad died directly from acute malnutrition.

=== Gendered impacts ===
The hunger crisis affected women disproportionately. Food insecurity increased most rapidly among female-headed households, with severe hunger rising from 14% in 2024 to 25.9% by early 2025. By July 2025, 75% of these households were food insecure, and nearly half reported poor food consumption. Female-headed households were three times more likely to be food insecure than those headed by men, while the number of women leading households was growing due to the death, disappearance, or displacement of male relatives.

Very few of these households were food secure, and a much larger share reported poor food consumption, with dietary quality worsening sharply between 2024 and early 2025. Women’s diets also lacked diversity at a national level, limiting essential micronutrients and increasing health risks. Female-headed households depended more on fragile coping strategies, such as remittances, and had limited access to stable income. They were around three times more likely to be food insecure than male-headed households, and a significant proportion were living in conditions approaching famine thresholds. Overall, their food consumption and resilience deteriorated markedly while men’s remained comparatively stable.

== Response ==
In March 2024, NGO WeCare, led by Saad Kassis-Mohamed, was reported to have raised US$100,000 to support humanitarian relief and reconstruction in Sudan during the civil war, with funds directed toward rehabilitation efforts and the rebuilding of homes in conflict-affected areas.

Sudanese factions were accused of using famine as a weapon of war, by attacking the country's most fertile states, displacing farmers, preventing humanitarian assisting and arresting volunteers. Both parties have also imposed food and aid sieges on areas they do not control. Observers call for the establishment of safe aid distribution zones, that rely on local initiatives, as well as accountability for perpetrators. In June 2024, UN experts stated that both the SAF and the RSF were deliberately withholding food and contributing to civilian starvation. The UN urged an end to the use of starvation as a method of warfare.

In June 2024, United States granted US$315 million in humanitarian aid to Sudan and refugee-receiving countries including the Central African Republic, Chad, Egypt, Ethiopia, and South Sudan.

Also in June 2024, United Arab Emirates set aside 70% of its US$100 million humanitarian pledge to give to Sudan and surrounding countries affected by the humanitarian crisis. The UAE planned to allocate the money to several UN humanitarian agencies to prevent further deterioration of famine conditions. Proposed aid included food distribution, building and supplying field hospitals, creating emergency shelters, and protecting women vulnerable to the crisis.

In September 2024, Sudanese agriculture minister Abubakr El Bishri denied that there was on ongoing famine in the country and accused humanitarian organizations of seeking to open the country's borders to "smuggle weapons and equipment" to the RSF.

As of September 2024, the 2024 Humanitarian Needs and Responses Plan is still underfunded with less than 50% of its desired US$2.7 billion fulfilled. However, the Adre border crossing point has been re-opened to Sudan.

On 27 September, the SPLM-N accused the Sudanese government of obstructing the delivery of humanitarian aid to famine-stricken areas.

On 23 November, an aid convoy from the WFP arrived in Zamzam IDP camp for the first time since the declaration of famine in the area in August. On 26 November, the Sudanese government accused the RSF of looting aid from a WFP convoy travelling from Port Sudan to Zamzam IDP camp as it passed through Armel, on the border between West and North Kordofan, adding that the looted items were diverted to Nyala.

On 23 December 2024, the Sudanese government suspended its participation in the IPC, or Integrated Food Security Phase Classification, accusing the organisation of “issuing unreliable reports that undermine Sudan’s sovereignty and dignity”.

In late January 2025, the new administration of US President Donald Trump froze foreign aid for 90 days with waivers supposed to be available for urgent and life-saving aid. However, the waiver process has been slow to get rolling.

In May 2025 the World Food Programme (WFP) reported that it reached a record-breaking 5 million people, marking a major milestone in its efforts to combat severe hunger. Despite ongoing conflict in Al-Fashir (North Darfur) and Kadugli (South Darfur), WFP has pre-positioned food and trucks, awaiting guarantees of safe passage, and continues to deliver digital cash assistance to 250,000 people in Al-Fashir though this remains insufficient given the scale of need. Meanwhile, in areas where fighting has subsided, such as Khartoum State and Gezira State, WFP has significantly scaled up operations, reaching over 1 million people in the past three months.

== See also ==
- 2017 South Sudan famine
- 1998 Sudan famine
- 1993 Sudan famine
- Famine in northern Ethiopia (2020–present)
- Politics of Sudan
