= Food security during the COVID-19 pandemic =

COVID-19 pandemic–related famines
Acute food insecurity estimates for 2020 using the IPC scale
Phase 1 (Minimal)
Phase 2 (Stressed)
Phase 3 (Crisis)
Phase 4 (Emergency)
Phase 5 (Critical)
No data
Not listed
Unclassified listed
At risk minority
Emerging hotspot
- Date: 1 December 2019–present
- Duration: 6 years and 10 months
- Location: Multiple countries; Afghanistan; Angola; Brazil; Burkina Faso; Chad; DR Congo; Ethiopia; Haiti; India; Mali; Mauritania; Myanmar; Niger; Nigeria; Pakistan; Senegal; South Africa; South Sudan; Sudan; Syria; Uganda; Venezuela; Yemen Full list see below
- Cause: 2019–2021 locust infestation, ongoing armed conflicts, COVID-19 pandemic (including associated recession, lockdowns and travel restrictions)

During the COVID-19 pandemic, food insecurity intensified in many places. In the second quarter of 2020, there were multiple warnings of famine later in the year. In an early report, the Nongovernmental Organization (NGO) Oxfam-International talks about "economic devastation" while the lead-author of the UNU-WIDER report compared COVID-19 to a "poverty tsunami". Others talk about "complete destitution", "unprecedented crisis", "natural disaster", "threat of catastrophic global famine". The decision of the WHO on 11 March 2020, to qualify COVID as a pandemic, that is "an epidemic occurring worldwide, or over a very wide area, crossing international boundaries and usually affecting a large number of people" also contributed to building this global-scale disaster narrative.

Field evidence collected in more than 60 countries in the course of 2020 indicate, however, that while some disruptions (affecting the stability of the global food system) were reported at local (hoarding) and international (restrictions on exports) levels, those took place primarily during the early days/weeks of the pandemic (and the subsequent waves of lockdowns) and did not lead to any major episode of "global famine", thus invalidating the catastrophic scenario that some experts had initially conjectured.

In September 2020, David Beasley, executive director of the World Food Programme, addressed the United Nations Security Council, stating that measures taken by donor countries over the course of the preceding five months, including the provision of $17 trillion in fiscal stimulus and central bank support, the suspension of debt repayments instituted by the IMF and G20 countries for the benefit of poorer countries, and donor support for WFP programmes, had averted impending famine, helping 270 million people at risk of starvation. As the pandemic-incited food issues began to subside, the 2022 Russian invasion of Ukraine triggered another global food crises compounding already extreme price increases.

== Background ==
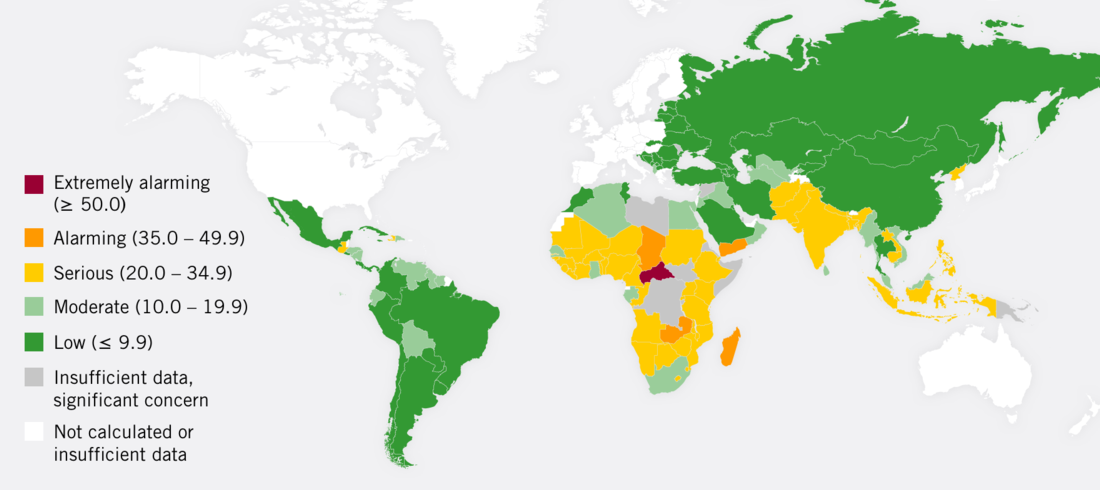
2019 Global Hunger Index by Severity

=== Locust infestations ===
Exceptional weather patterns in 2018, including heavy rain, resulted in exponential growth of the desert locust population in the Arabian Peninsula and Horn of Africa during 2019. Locusts form swarms which then go on to destroy crops, reducing food availability for both livestock and humans. The Food and Agriculture Organization and the World Bank state that 23 countries have been affected by locust infestations and an estimated US$8.5 billion in asset damages alone. An estimated 24 million people in associated regions were estimated to have had poor food security in July 2020.

The new locust wave spreading across Africa in June 2020 also sparked fears that supply shortages, especially in nations like Syria, Yemen, India and Ethiopia, might escalate the famine in their regions.

=== COVID-19 pandemic ===
Following the international spread of the coronavirus SARS-CoV-2 and thus its associated illness, coronavirus disease 2019, several national governments implemented national lockdowns and international travel restrictions in order to prevent the spread of the disease. As a result of these precautions and panic buying, shortages related to the COVID-19 pandemic considerably rose whilst aid delivery capabilities and remittances from high-income nations fell. Simultaneously, many poorer workers in low- and middle-income nations also lost their jobs or ability to farm as a result of these lockdowns, whilst children could not receive school meals due to the education shutdown across much of the world. The situation was further sustained into 2021 and beyond, with the 2021–2022 global supply chain crisis affecting the delivery of food and the 2021-2022 global energy crisis affecting the production of petrochemical fertilizer essential for food production.

The COVID-19 pandemic significantly disrupted global food security, affecting all four pillars: availability, access, utilization, and stability. Restrictions on movement, job losses, and supply chain disruptions led to increased food insecurity, particularly among low-income households. In developing countries, the pandemic exacerbated existing vulnerabilities, while developed nations also faced rising food insecurity due to economic downturns and disrupted food supply systems.

A confirmed 6,881,955 people have died directly from COVID-19, but Oxfam indicated in their July 2020 report that when including those who have died as a result of lack of food, this number is considerably higher. Oxfam projected in July 2020 that by the end of the year "12,000 people per day could die from COVID-19 linked hunger", with the United Nations stating that a total of 265 million people face acute food insecurity – an increase of 135 million people as a result of the pandemic.

The chief of the World Food Programme warned in April 2020 that without continued financial support from western nations, the 30 million people supported by the programme were at risk of death as a result of food insecurity in 2020. On 9 July, Oxfam released a report highlighting ten areas of "extreme hunger" alongside "emerging epicentres" of hunger, including areas in South America, Africa, the Middle East and South Asia. In the third quarter, the concerns were reiterated in the New York Times and both the World Food Programme and the World Health Organization published statements noting the impact of COVID-19 lockdowns on livelihoods and food security.

Overall, a review of evidence shows that in 2020, the biggest impact of COVID-19 on the different dimensions of food security has been on food access and affordability -and not on food availability, as was initially feared by many experts. Food systems' main function as a food supplier has thus been successfully maintained, with the New York Times stating: "The unfolding tragedy falls short of a famine [...] Food remains widely available in most of the world, though prices have climbed in many countries. Rather, with the world economy expected to contract nearly 5 percent this year [...] hundreds of millions of people are suffering an intensifying crisis over how to secure their basic dietary needs.".

Furthermore, there has been a significant disruption of various sectors, among the main implications of the crisis for food production would be: agriculture, animal industry, chemical supplies, value of land, markets and supply chains and jobs in agriculture.

In sum, although the outcome of COVID-19 has been a sharp degradation in food security, the food system itself has not been the cause of that degradation; instead the origin of this food security crisis has been the contraction of the global economy.

=== Armed conflicts ===
Several armed conflicts and displacement crises are ongoing, including those associated with the Yemeni Civil War, Syrian Civil War, insurgency in the Maghreb, Russo-Ukrainian War and Afghanistan conflict. Food production and transport through areas in armed conflicts is poor, and both armed and political conflict results in large displacements including refugees of the Syrian Civil War and the Venezuelan refugee crisis. As a result, these areas are more vulnerable to famine and food insecurity is high.

== Global Report on Food Crises ==
On 21 April, the United Nations World Food Programme warned that a famine "of biblical proportions" was expected in several parts of the world as a result of the pandemic. The release of 2020 Global Report on Food Crises indicated that 55 countries were at risk, with David Beasley estimating that in a worst-case scenario "about three dozen" countries would succumb to famine.

The United Nations forecast that the following member states would have significant areas with poor food security categorised as under "stress" (IPC phase 2), "crisis" (IPC phase 3), "emergency" (IPC phase 4) or "critical emergency" (IPC phase 5) in 2020:

- Afghanistan*
- Angola
- Burkina Faso*
- Cabo Verde
- Cameroon
- CAR
- Chad*
- Cote d'Ivoire
- DR Congo
- El Salvador
- Eswatini
- Ethiopia*
- Gambia
- Guatemala
- Guinea
- Guinea-Bissau
- Haiti*
- Honduras
- Iraq
- Kenya
- Lesotho
- Liberia
- Libya
- Madagascar
- Malawi
- Mali*
- Mauritania*
- Mozambique
- Myanmar
- Namibia
- Nicaragua
- Niger*
- Nigeria*
- Pakistan
- Rwanda
- Senegal*
- Sierra Leone
- Somalia
- South Sudan*
- Sudan*
- Syria*
- Uganda
- Tanzania
- Venezuela*
- Yemen*
- Zambia
- Zimbabwe

It also raises alerts around:

- Bangladesh, Rohingya Refugees in Cox's Bazar
- Colombia, amongst Venezuelan* migrants and refugees
- Djibouti
- Ecuador, amongst Venezuelan* migrants and refugees
- Lebanon, amongst Syrian* refugees
- Palestine
- Turkey, amongst Syrian* refugees
- Ukraine, in the Luhansk and Donetsk oblasts:
  - Donetsk People's Republic (not recognised by the UN)
  - Luhansk People's Republic (not recognised by the UN)

An asterisk (*) indicates that country is considered to be an "extreme hunger" hotspot by Oxfam, as indicated in the July 2020 Oxfam report. These ten key areas of "extreme hunger" that account for 65% of the total population facing crisis-level hunger (IPC phase 3 or above) include Afghanistan, DR Congo, Ethiopia, Haiti, South Sudan, Sudan, Syria, Venezuela, Yemen and the West African Sahel (including Burkina Faso, Chad, Mali, Mauritania, Niger, Nigeria and Senegal). It also noted "emerging epicentres" of hunger, alongside famine-stricken areas, in Brazil, India, Yemen, South Africa and the Sahel. The United Nations has made an "urgent call" to improve data analytics in several countries which may be at risk, including Congo, North Korea, Eritrea, Kyrgyzstan, Nepal, Philippines and Sri Lanka.

== Impact by area ==
=== Americas ===
==== Brazil ====
Brazil has been classified as an "emerging epicentre" of hunger by Oxfam. 38 million people in Brazil are part of the informal economy, with the vast majority entering unemployment as a result of local lockdowns. Several favelas have had poor water supply or water supply cut off during the pandemic, exacerbating worries about access to food and water. In March 2020, the National Congress of Brazil approved a payment plan of 600 reais (US$114) to informal workers. However, this has been criticised by Caritas, with the Brazilian executive director stating "now, it is just about food".

==== Haiti ====
Haiti has been classified as an "extreme hunger" hotspot by Oxfam. Haiti has been in recession for 1.5 years, with the cost of rice doubling since 2019. A drop in remittances, which account for 20% of the nation's GDP, as a result of an increase in unemployment in the United States and other western nations alongside has exacerbated the crisis. Half of all Haitian jobs are in agriculture, which has been severely hit by the pandemic. Pre-pandemic, the United Nations had forecast that 40% of Haitians would rely on international aid for food, and it is expected that this number will rise.

==== United States ====
===== Food availability =====
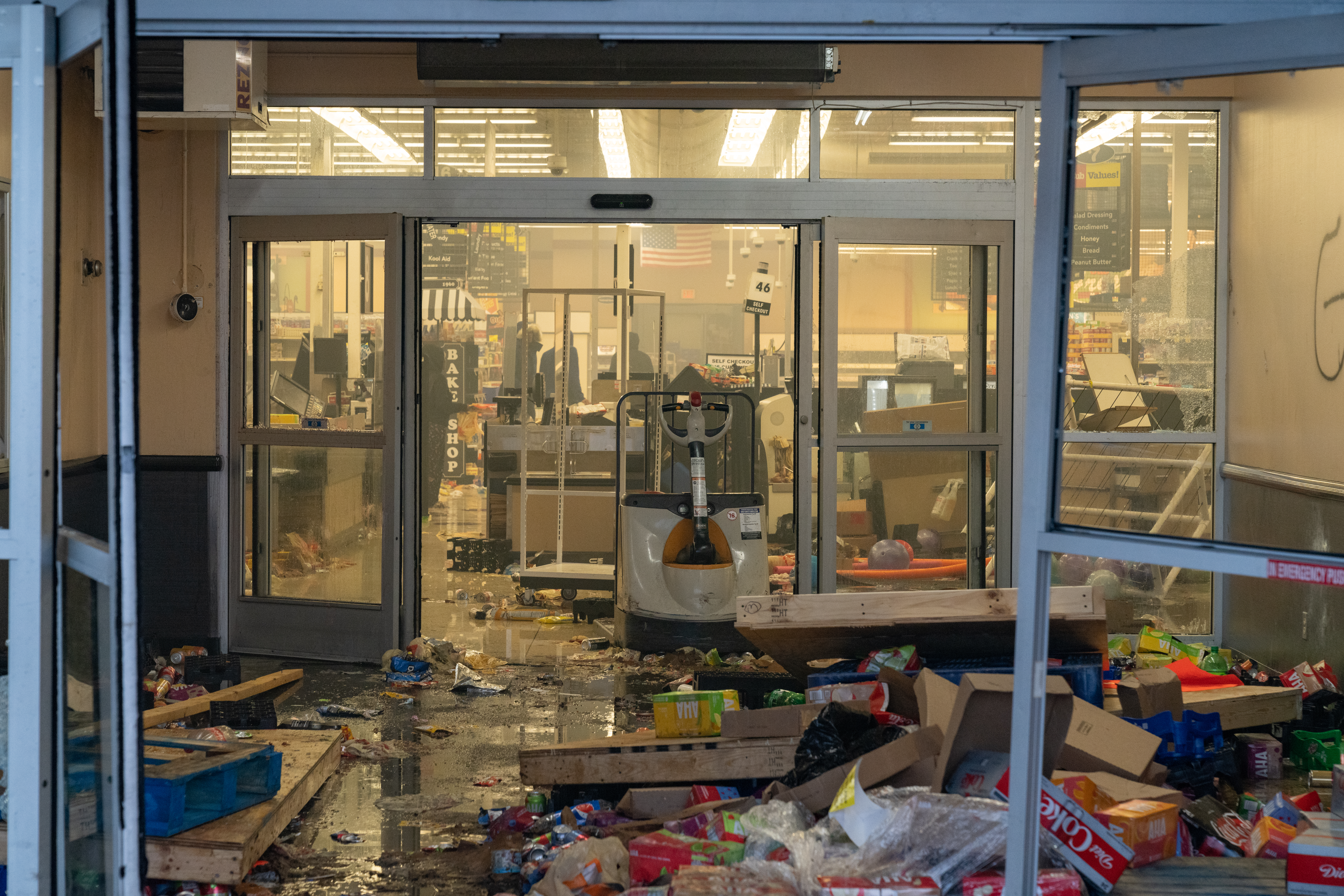
Damage to the Cub Foods grocery store sustained during riots in Minneapolis, Minnesota

Following protests against police brutality and associated civil unrest, some cities experienced lack of food. This unrest can accelerate the flight of businesses in areas where the expectation of safe operation is low. For example, in Chicago's South Side communities, there were few choices for groceries as most stores closed in order to prevent looting. In Minneapolis when protests against police brutality started, some neighbourhoods saw looting and vandalism. Lake Street suffered from a food desert with few grocery stores, pharmacies and other essential businesses open. These issues are compounded by local lockdowns, with many businesses also closed because of the pandemic.

===== Remittances =====
The United States is the world's largest source of remittances, and money sent from workers in the United States abroad to low and middle income nations is vital for the economies of recipient nations. In 2019, remittances from the United States and other western nations accounts for a large proportion of many national GDP values, most notably Tonga (37.6%), Haiti (37.1%), South Sudan (34.1%), Kyrgyzstan (29.2%), and Tajikistan (28.2%). However, the World Bank forecasts that remittances are expected to drop 19.7% to US$445 billion, which it states represents "a loss of a crucial financing lifeline for many vulnerable households" requiring many to redirect savings away from education towards solving food shortages. It is likely that this drop in remittance is associated with the lockdown and recession in western nations, such as the United States, which increase joblessness and prevent many from sending money to families in their home countries. This is likely to add additional strain in areas at risk of food insecurity, especially in nations facing other crises.

==== Venezuela ====
Venezuela has been classified as an "extreme hunger" hotspot by Oxfam. Heightened political turmoil and extreme food shortages have led to the largest refugee crisis in the Americas. Both those in Venezuela and those fleeing to neighbouring countries, such as Colombia and Ecuador, have been identified as at high risk of food insecurity. The United Nations has identified that at least one-third of the remaining population in Venezuela do not have enough food to sustain themselves. These shortages have been economically exacerbated by a fall in the price of oil as a result of the 2020 Russia–Saudi Arabia oil price war. 74% of Venezuelan families have adopted coping strategies to deal with the shortage of food, including eating less and accepting food as payment.

=== East Africa ===
East Africa as a region is highly vulnerable due to the locust infestations that have recently plagued the area. Nations such as Ethiopia, Sudan, South Sudan have been fighting food insecurity since the 2019-20 locust infestations began in June 2019 and are "extreme hunger" hotspots. One in five of all acutely food-insecure people live in the Intergovernmental Authority on Development region.

==== Ethiopia ====
Ethiopia has been classified as an "extreme hunger" hotspot by Oxfam. Alongside the locust infestation and pandemic, Ethiopia faces insecurity due to conflict, extreme weather and long-lasting economic shock.

==== Uganda ====
According to IPC statistics published in October 2020, there were over 400,000 refugees in Uganda at crisis hunger levels, with a further 90,000 experiencing extreme hunger and 135,000 acutely malnourished children requiring urgent treatment, due to lockdowns and other COVID-related restrictions that have impacted livelihoods, coinciding with cuts in food aid.

=== Europe ===
==== United Kingdom ====
Food banks in the UK reported a major increase in uptake during the pandemic in 2020, particularly among previously middle-income households, following job losses and gaps in the welfare system. UNICEF also distributed food in the UK for the first time in its 70-year history.

=== Middle East ===
==== Syria ====
Syrians have been facing acute food insecurity as a result of the Syrian Civil War, which began in 2011. An estimated 17 million people in Syria – more than 50% of the remaining population – are considered acutely food insecure, with an additional 2.2 million at risk. Refugees of the Syrian Civil War are also at risk high risk of being food-insecure, with refugee camps in neighbouring Turkey and Lebanon highlighted as greatly at-risk by the United Nations. In June 2020, an international donor conference raised US$5.5 billion for humanitarian assistance in Syria.

==== Yemen ====
Yemen is one of the most food-insecure countries in the world, with an estimated 2 million children under five suffering from acute malnutrition. Belligerents have been accused of embargoing or blockading food for civilians, likely as a result of general scarcity of resources. Yemen has also been affected by the locust infestation as well as a cholera outbreak alongside the COVID-19 pandemic. The combined effects of these disasters has resulted in an exceptional humanitarian crisis. Before the pandemic in 2019, the United Nations had estimated 20 million Yemenis were acutely food insecure and another 10 million were at very high risk. The United Nations has requested US$2.4 billion in funds to help prevent widespread starvation in Yemen, with the death toll due to starvation expected to exceed deaths caused by war, cholera and COVID-19.

=== Sahel and West Africa ===
Described by Oxfam as the "fastest-growing" hunger crisis, and an "extreme hunger" hotspot, the West African Sahel has 13.4 million people in need of immediate food assistance. The pandemic has exacerbated food insecurity concerns caused by the insurgency in the Maghreb and Sahel as well as extreme weather patterns.

On 23 July 2020, the African Development Bank (ADB), United Nations High Commissioner for Refugees (UNHCR) and the G5 Sahel signed an agreement in Geneva, Abidjan and Nouakchott. Under the pact, five countries of the Sahel region, Burkina Faso, Chad, Mali, Mauritania and Niger, were to receive $20 million to strengthen the response to the COVID-19 pandemic.

=== Southeast Asia ===
==== Cambodia ====
During Cambodia's lockdown of Phnom Penh in response to the pandemic in the country in April 2021, tens of thousands of residents of the capital reportedly requested emergency food aid, particularly in "red zones" where food markets were closed. Government managed food distribution struggled to meet demand in the city.

=== South Asia ===
==== Afghanistan ====
Afghanistan has been highlighted by Oxfam as an "extreme hunger" hotspot. Between January and May 2020, 84,600 Afghans fled their homes as a result of armed conflict in the area, with these internally displaced persons at high risk of food insecurity. Alongside this, the effect of the pandemic on neighbouring countries has resulted in Afghan migrants returning home, with 300,000 undocumented migrants estimated to have crossed the border from Iran, where many have become jobless. These migrants are also at-risk and have poor food security. The pandemic has also had an effect on logistics and aid supply that would otherwise normally be present.

==== Bangladesh ====
Pre-pandemic, Bangladesh was considered a country with poor food security, with 40 million people considered food insecure and 11 million people acutely hungry. In addition to this, the World Food Programme has provided aid 880,000 Rohingya people fleeing from the Rohingya genocide ongoing in Myanmar, with Prime Minister Sheikh Hasini estimating that at least 1.1 million refugees have fled into Bangladesh. Many of these refugees rely on aid for food, water, education and shelter which have been put at risk by the coronavirus pandemic and locust outbreaks, in a nation already reliant on outside aid for its non-migrant population. Malnutrition, sanitation and access to clean drinking water are problems in many of these camps. Specifically, the United Nations in its Global Report on Food Crises singled out Cox's Bazar where two state-run refugee camps – the Kutupalong refugee camp and the Nayapara refugee camp – are located.

==== India ====
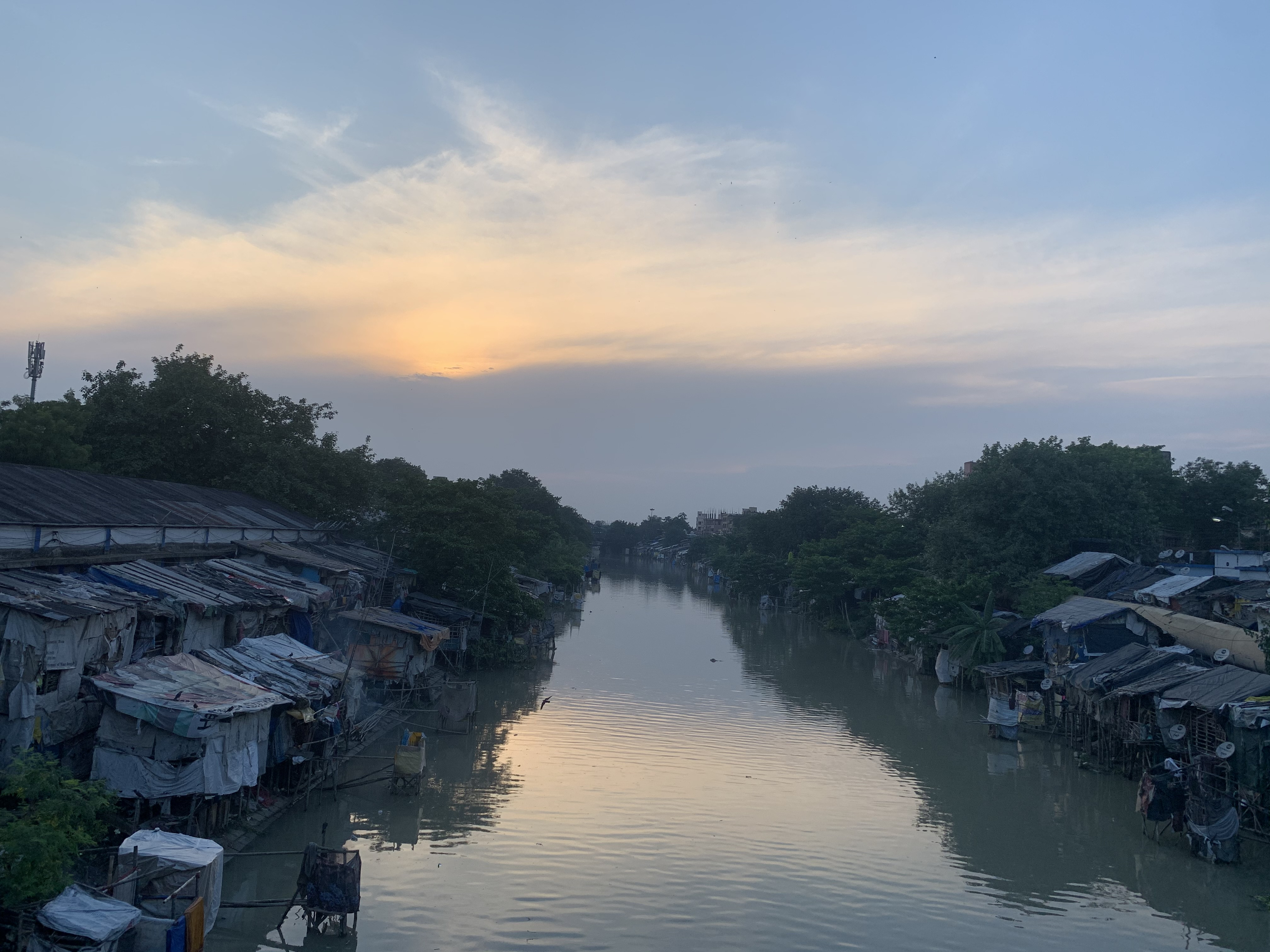
Kolkata slum area in May 2020

India has been identified as an "emerging epicentre" of hunger by Oxfam. Around 90 million children who would normally receive school meals are no longer able to do so following the education shutdown across India. It has become a logistical challenge to deliver food, despite the fact that in 2019 India had 77.72 million tonnes in surplus grain stocks. T. M. Thomas Isaac, finance minister of Kerala stated that "an absolute shortage" of essential goods may arise. The informal sector represents 81% of labour in India, with many of these informal workers becoming jobless as a result of lockdown. This has left many unable to pay for food to feed their families. In response, the Indian government has set up "relief camps" to provide shelter and food to informal and migrant workers. However, many of these became overwhelmed with the large numbers of people requiring food and shelter. Access to slums to deliver essential services and aid has also been hampered by requirements for social distancing. According to The Telegraph, approximately 90% of the Indian workforce are informal workers, who found themselves without any income during months of lockdown; in response the government introduced a £200 billion programme to provide free food supplies to 800 million of its citizens.

== Industry response ==
The July 2020 Oxfam report on coronavirus famines calculated that between January and July 2020, the course of the coronavirus pandemic spreading, the eight largest food companies (The Coca-Cola Company, Danone, General Mills, Kellogg's, Mondelez, Nestlé, PepsiCo and Unilever) gave a total of US$18 billion to shareholders in dividends, 10 times the size of the United Nations estimate for aid required to alleviate food insecurity in famine-stricken areas. Several of these companies, including Nestlé and PepsiCo wrote with the UN and several farmers' unions to the G20 for support in food distribution and food supply to low income nations.

== International response ==
=== Supranational ===
- African Union: The Union issued a declaration, describing "deep concern" in the continent, urging member states to prioritise farmers and food production as essential services and called upon "UN agencies, multilateral development banks, donor countries and other partners to consider the emergency as urgent and step up and provide financial and other resources to help countries that do not have the resources to adequately respond to this crisis".
- European Union: The EU supported the release of the Global Report on Food Crises by the UN, and said it was "working to address the root causes of extreme hunger" as part of an "international alliance".
- United Nations: Dominique Burgeon, director of the Food and Agriculture Organization called for increased support for poorer and high-risk nations, stating "This is a matter of international solidarity, and humanity, but also a matter of global security... The world community needs to come together. We can avoid food shortages if we are able to support countries across the globe."

=== National ===
- Madagascar: The government of Madagascar reported a famine in the southern regions of the country beginning in June 2021, and it was still considered an ongoing disaster in July 2025, and is considered a consequence of the handling of the COVID-19 pandemic in the country. The government of then president Andry Rajoelina attempted to curb the hunger by distributing butane gas stoves, as well as asking for international assistance. Rajoelina faced strong backlash, with one incident involving a journalist confronting him during a press conference.
- United Kingdom: Foreign Secretary Dominic Raab announced a £119 million fund to tackle coronavirus and famine, stating "coronavirus and famine threaten millions in some of the world's poorest countries, and give rise to direct problems that affect the UK, including terrorism and migration flows."

== See also ==
- Shortages related to the COVID-19 pandemic
- COVID-19 pandemic in Africa
- COVID-19 pandemic in Asia
- COVID-19 pandemic in South America
- Famine scales
- Globalisation and disease
