= 2025 Libyan ship fire =

Ship fire off the coast of Libya

Details
- Date: 14 September 2025
- Location: Off the coast of Libya

Statistics
- Passengers: 74
- Deaths: 61
- Injured: 13

On September 14, 2025, a ship carrying 74 Sudanese refugees caught fire and killed at least 61 people.

== Refugees in Libya ==
Libya is a major transit route for African immigrants traveling to Europe. As of February, there were about 867,055 migrants from 44 nationalities residing in Libya. The war in Sudan has pushed over 140,000 refugees into Libya in the past two years. In recent years, refugees staying in Libya have faced violence, kidnapping, torture, and extortion.

== Fire ==
A rubber boat carrying 74 Sudanese refugees caught fire 37 miles (60 km) off the coast of Tobruk, Libya, while heading to Greece. Out of the 74 passengers, 61 were killed and only 13 survived.

== Aftermath ==
The United Nations migration agency has provided medical support to 24 survivors.
