= Zamzam and Abu Shouk refugee camp massacres =

2025 civilian attacks during Sudanese civil war

- Part of Siege of El Fasher and War crimes during the Sudanese civil war (2023–present)
- Location: Zamzam IDP camp 13°29′18.68″N 25°18′38.4″E; Abu Shouk IDP camp 13°40′17.34″N 25°21′0.5″E; Zamzam Refugee Camp and Abu Shouk Camp, North Darfur, Sudan
- Date: 13 April 2024 – 13 April 2025 (1 year)
- Target: Civilians and humanitarian workers
- Attack type: Shelling, indiscriminate shooting, and arson
- Deaths: 389+
- Injuries: 157+
- Victim: Internally displaced persons
- Perpetrator: Rapid Support Forces
- Hundreds of structures including residences, marketplaces, and medical facilities destroyed

During the Sudanese civil war (2023–present), the Rapid Support Forces (RSF) continuously shelled and attacked refugee camps near el Fasher in Sudan, as part of its Siege of El Fasher. The attacks, which primarily targeted Zamzam camp and Abu Shouk camp, resulted in significant civilian casualties and widespread destruction of critical infrastructure. According to Sudanese government officials and humanitarian organizations, these incidents represented one of the most severe human rights violations since the beginning of the Sudanese conflict.

== Timeline ==
The RSF has continuously shelled Zamzam and Abu Shouk IDP camps since the beginning of its offensive on El Fasher on 13 April 2024. In June 2024, at the Abu Shouk IDP camp, 19 people were killed and 25 others injured from shelling. On 26 August, 24 were killed and 40 others were injured. On 23 November, 7 were killed, and on 26 December, 3 were killed.

In 2024, at the Zamzam IDP camp, an unspecified number of people were killed on 1 December. During the same month, 8 were killed on 2 December, 12 were killed near the camp and 4 in the camp on 5 December, 9 were killed on 10 December, and 15 were killed in December 2024.

In 2025, at the Abu Shouk IDP camp, at least 11 were killed on 20 January, 2 were killed on 23 January, 7 were killed and 12 were injured on 29 January, 11 were killed on 1 February, more than 80 were killed and injured on 4 March, 7 were killed on 31 March, 2 were killed on 2 April, 3 were killed on 7 April, at least 15 were killed on 10 April, and 6 were killed on 6 May.

In 2025, at the Zamzam IDP camp, 16 were killed on 11 January, 3 were killed on 7 February, and 31 were killed on 12 February following two days of RSF attacks. These attacks also forced thousands to flee to Tawila. On 12 April, an RSF attack on Zamzam Refugee Camp killed and injured hundreds, most of them women and children. On 13 April, the RSF claimed to have taken the Zamzam camp.

== April 2025 massacres ==
An initial offensive conducted by the RSF against Zamzam Camp occurred on 10 April 2025. Military operations continued through Saturday, 12 April, with successive waves of attacks striking both camps. During these three days, RSF forces reportedly destroyed hundreds of residential structures, marketplaces, and medical facilities across both settlements, including Zamzam camp's central marketplace.

The General Coordination of Displaced Persons and Refugees advocacy group reported that the combined assaults left "hundreds dead and wounded," with women and children constituting the majority of victims. United Nations Humanitarian Coordinator Clementine Nkweta-Salami confirmed at least 100 civilian fatalities across both settlements. She also reported that over twenty children were killed, as well as nine humanitarian workers.

An assault on Abu Shouk Camp killed 35 civilians, according to documentation from refugee advocacy groups. This included shelling on 10 April that killed at least 15 and injured at least 25 others. The targeted locations collectively housed approximately 700,000 internally displaced persons at the time of the attacks. Many survivors remained effectively trapped within the devastated camps, unable to evacuate to safer areas.

On 13 April 2025, the RSF seized control of the camp, displacing 400,000, and have since been systematically destroying it through deliberate arson. An RSF-allied militia abducted 40 aid workers and about 50 civilians who were evacuating the Zamzam camp. The RSF converted the camp into a military base.

== Reactions ==
The RSF issued a formal denial regarding their alleged involvement in atrocities at Zamzam Camp. The paramilitary organisation claimed that video footage purporting to show civilian suffering was fabricated by the Sudanese Armed Forces as part of a coordinated misinformation campaign involving actors and staged scenes to damage the RSF's reputation.

Various humanitarian organisations classified the incidents as potential war crimes and crimes against humanity. The General Coordination of Displaced Persons and Refugees explicitly condemned the attacks using this terminology in their official communications.

== See also ==
- List of massacres in Sudan
- Al-Kadaris and Al-Khelwat massacres
- Kabkabiya market airstrike
- 2024 Eastern Gezira State massacres
- Masalit massacres (2023–present)
- Gezira State canal killings (2024–2025)
- El Fasher massacre
