= Famine scales =

Measurement of food security

Famine scales are metrics of food security going from entire populations with adequate food to full-scale famine. The word "famine" has highly emotive and political connotations and there has been extensive discussion among international relief agencies offering food aid as to its exact definition. For example, in 1998, although a full-scale famine had developed in southern Sudan, a disproportionate amount of donor food resources went to the Kosovo War. This ambiguity about whether or not a famine is occurring, and the lack of commonly agreed upon criteria by which to differentiate food insecurity has prompted renewed interest in offering precise definitions. As different levels of food insecurity demand different types of response, there have been various methods of famine measurement proposed to help agencies determine the appropriate response.

== Measurement methods ==
A tension that has existed in all attempts to define a famine is between definitions of famine as an event and definitions as a process. In the first case, famine is defined (roughly) as the event of many people dying of starvation within a locality or region. In the second, famine is described as a chronology beginning with a disruption or disruptions that gradually leads to widespread death. However, these general definitions have little utility for those implementing food relief as "region", "widespread", etc. are undefined.

One of the earliest methods of measurement was the Indian Famine Codes developed by the colonial British in the 1880s. The Famine Codes defined three levels of food insecurity: near-scarcity, scarcity, and famine. "Scarcity" was defined as three successive years of crop failure, crop yields of one-third or one-half normal, and large populations in distress. "Famine" further included a rise in food prices above 140% of "normal", the movement of people in search of food, and widespread mortality. The Punjab Food Code stated, "Imminence of death is the sole criterion for declaration of famine." Inherent in the Famine Codes was the assumption that famine was an event, and not a process.

The basic premise of the Famine Codes formed the basis of numerous subsequent early warning systems. One of the most efficacious is the Turkana District Early Warning System in northern Kenya in which indicators include rainfall levels, market prices of cereals, status of livestock, rangeland conditions and trends, and enrollment on food-for-work projects. The system identifies three levels of crisis: alarm, alert and emergency, each of which is linked to a planned response to mitigate the crisis and try to prevent a worsening of the situation.

International organizations responding to recent food crises created ad hoc measurements. In 2002, the World Food Programme created a number of "pre-famine indicators" for Ethiopia and combined it with measurements of nutrition levels to create recommendations. The Food Security Assessment Unit (FSAU) devised a system for Somalia with four levels: Non-alert (near normal), Alert (requires close attention), Livelihood Crisis (basic social structures under threat) and Humanitarian Emergency (threat of widespread mortality requiring immediate humanitarian assistance). This system formed the basis for the subsequently developed IPC five-phase scale.

== Livelihoods strategies ==
The FSAU system is one of several recent systems that draws a distinction between "saving lives" and "saving livelihoods". Older models concentrated simply on the mortality of famine victims. However, relief agencies gradually realized that the means by which families and individuals supported themselves were threatened first

Previously famines had been perceived as a threat to individuals, even large numbers of individuals. Inherent in the livelihoods strategies outlook is the conception of famine as a social problem. Populations affected by increased food stress will try to cope through market structures (i.e. selling possessions for food) and reliance upon community and family support structures. It is only when such social structures collapse under the strain that individuals are faced with the malnutrition and starvation that has commonly been viewed as "famine".

During the 1980s and 1990s, studies of the process by which populations adapted to food stress as food security worsened received much attention. Four stages of the process were identified:

1. Reversible strategies, in response to 'normal' food stress, such as rationing food or diversifying income
2. Irreversible strategies in response to prolonged food stress, such as selling breeding livestock or mortgaging land, which trade short-term survival for long-term difficulty
3. The failure of internal coping methods and total dependence on external food aid
4. Severe malnutrition leading to weakened immune systems, illness and death, in the event of the failure of the first three levels of coping. Death caused directly by starvation forms a fraction of deaths in a famine.

== Nutrition levels ==
Various nutrition benchmarks have been proposed as the cut-off points for food insecurity levels. The United Nations Refugee Nutrition Information System lists a number of such indicator cutoff points:

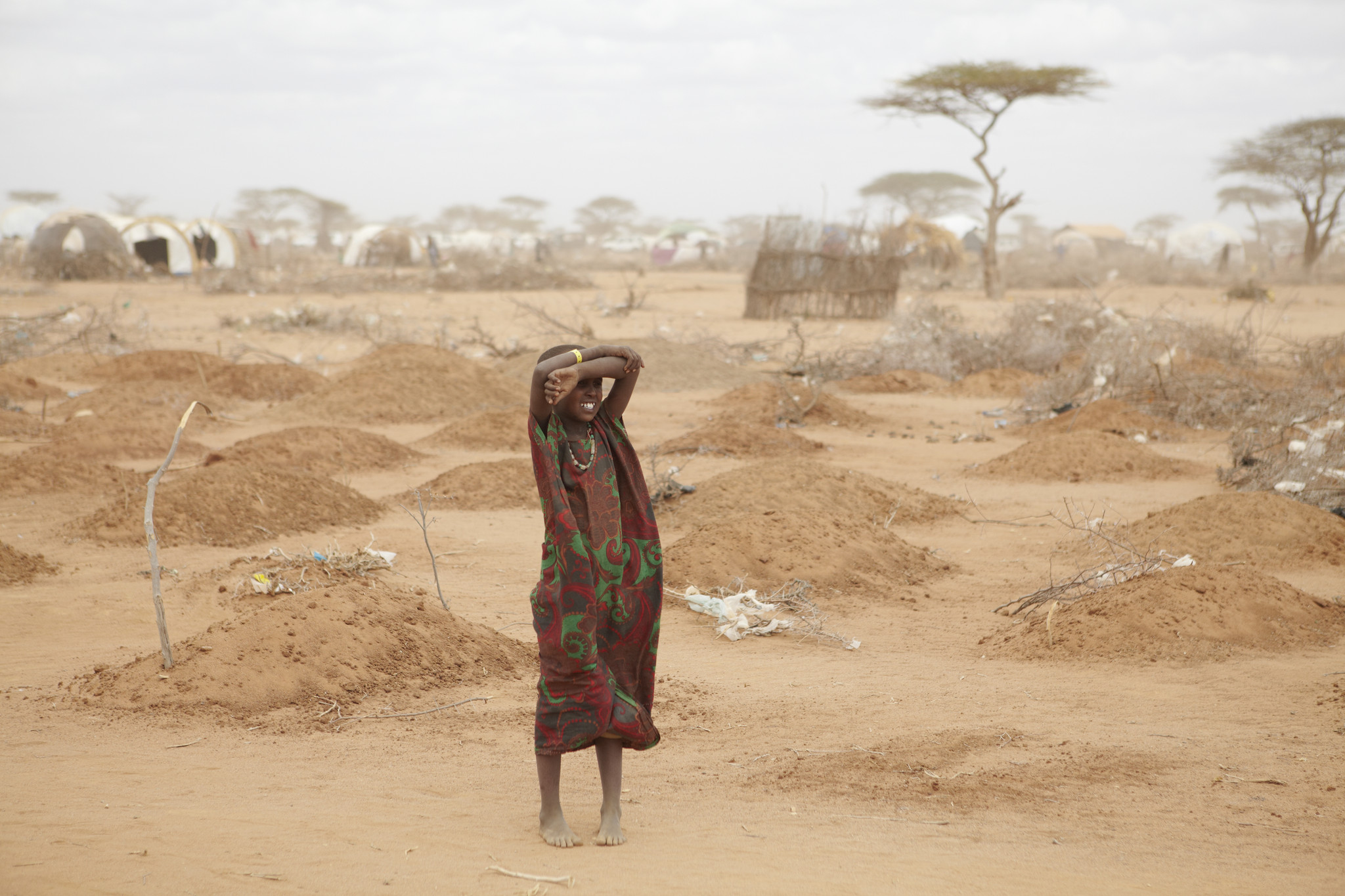
Freshly-dug graves for child victims of the 2011 East Africa drought, Dadaab refugee camp, Kenya

- Wasting - defined as less than -2 standard deviations in body weight, usually for children between six and 59 months
  - 5-10% = normal in African populations in non-drought conditions
  - Greater than 20% = "serious situation"
  - Greater than 40% = "severe crisis"
- Oedema due to kwashiorkor (swollen belly) is always a "cause for concern"
- Crude mortality rate (CMR), i.e. number of deaths per ten thousand people in a time span
  - 1/10,000/day = "serious situation"
  - Greater than 2/10,000/day = "emergency out of control"
- Under-five mortality rate (U5MR), i.e. number of deaths of children under five years of age within a time span
  - 2/10,000/day = "serious situation"
  - 4/10,000/day = "emergency out of control"

The use of these cut-offs is contentious. Some argue that a crude mortality rate of one death per ten thousand people per day is already a full-scale emergency. Others note that while most indicators are focused on children, parents will often reduce their own food consumption in favor of their children. Child malnutrition may thus be a trailing indicator, indicating non-emergency levels even after adult malnutrition has reached crisis levels. It has also been noted that malnutrition is often not directly related to food availability; malnutrition is often the result of disease or poor child-care practices, even with adequate food availability.

== Combined intensity and magnitude scales ==
In an influential paper published in 2004, Paul Howe and Stephen Devereux, both of the Institute of Development Studies at the University of Sussex, set forth a measurement of famine with scales for both "intensity" and "magnitude", incorporating many of the developments of recent decades. The intensity scale is:

Level	Phrase	Lives	Livelihood
0	Food secure	Crude Mortality Rate (CMR) < 0.2/10,000/day; and/or Wasting < 2.3%	Cohesive social system; food prices stable; Coping strategies not utilized
1	Food insecure	0.2 ≤ CMR < 0.5/10,000/day; and/or 2.3% ≤ Wasting < 10%	Cohesive social system; Food prices unstable; Seasonal shortages; Reversible coping strategies taken
2	Food crisis	0.5 ≤ CMR < 1/10,000/day; 10% ≤ Wasting < 20%; and/or prevalence of oedema	Social system stressed but largely cohesive; Dramatic rise in food and basic items prices; Adaptive mechanisms begin to fail; Increase in irreversible coping strategies
3	Famine	1 ≤ CMR < 5/10,000/day; 20% ≤ Wasting < 40%; and/or prevalence of oedema	Clear signs of social breakdown; markets begin to collapse; coping strategies exhausted and survival strategies (migration in search of help, abandonment of weaker members of the community) adopted; affected population identifies food scarcity as the major societal problem
4	Severe famine	5 ≤ CMR <15/10,000/day; Wasting ≥ 40%; and/or prevalence of oedema	Widespread social breakdown; markets close; survival strategies widespread; affected population identifies food scarcity as the major societal problem
5	Extreme famine	CMR ≥ 15/10,000/day	Complete social breakdown; widespread mortality; affected population identifies food scarcity as the major societal problem

On the magnitude scale:

Category	Phrase	Mortality range
A	Minor famine	0-999
B	Moderate famine	1,000-9,999
C	Major famine	10,000-99,999
D	Great famine	100,000-999,999
E	Catastrophic famine	1,000,000 and over

Using this framework, each famine would receive a Magnitude designation, but locations within the affected region would be classified at varying Intensities. The 1998 southern Sudan famine would be a C: Major Famine, with an intensity of 5: Extreme famine in Ajiep village ranging to 3: Famine in Rumbek town. In comparison, the 2000 Ethiopian famine in Gode district would be classified as a B: Moderate famine, and would thus should demand proportionally less of the limited resources available for famine relief.

While each organization working in famine-related areas has its own operational interpretation of specific indicators, the Howe-Devereaux framework has been widely adopted as a common framework by which famine warning and famine relief may be discussed worldwide, in particular in the use of the intensity scale. This has led organizations such as the World Food Programme to refrain from referring to the 2005 Niger food crisis as a famine, as indicators had not deteriorated into a Level 3: Famine. As of 2025, both Sudan and Afghanistan are classified as an E for catastrophic and Level 5 for extreme famine.

== See also ==
- Integrated Food Security Phase Classification (IPC)
- Global Acute Malnutrition
