= MSF =

MSF most commonly refers to: Médecins Sans Frontières (sometimes rendered in English as Doctors Without Borders), humanitarian-aid non-governmental organization

MSF may also refer to:

== Organizations ==
- Manufacturing, Science and Finance, a UK trade union (now part of Unite)
- Marxist Student Federation (UK), in the UK
- Mathematical Sciences Foundation, an Indian institution for education and research
- Mind Science Foundation
- Ministry of Social and Family Development, in Singapore
- Misfits Gaming, a professional esports organization whose shortened name is "MSF"
- Motorcycle Safety Foundation, the US organization that promotes motorcycle safety
- Muhammad Subuh Foundation, a Subud charitable foundation
- Multiservice Switching Forum or MultiService Forum, a telecommunications industry association
- Muslim Students Federation (disambiguation), in India
- Muslim Safety Forum, in the UK

== Science and technology ==
- Methanesulfonyl fluoride
- Multiple streams framework, in political science
- Microsoft Solutions Framework, for delivering information technology solutions
- Multi-Stage Flash, a water desalination process
- MSF, former call sign of Time from NPL
- Mail summary file (.msf), a Mork computer file extension
- Magnetic stripe facility (MSF) usually has several bytes of capacity which provides devices to read data from or to write data to. Mostly can be seen on passbooks or legacy credit cards.
- Million square feet, unit of measurement
- Main support frame in engineering

== Other uses ==
- A US Navy hull classification symbol: Minesweeper, steel hulled (MSF)
- Militaires Sans Frontières, (Soldiers Without Borders) a fictional mercenary group; see List of characters in the Metal Gear series
- Master of Science in Finance - a graduate degree
- Military science fiction -a subgenre of science fiction focused on armed forces and battles
- Mundane science fiction - a subgenre of science fiction set in the solar system using existing technologies
- Male Seeking Female in online dating
