= Tawila =

Town in Sudan

Tawila طويلة
- Location in Sudan
- Coordinates: 13°30′49.92″N 24°51′40.43″E
- Country: (Sudan) Sudan; De facto: Liberated Areas
- State: North Darfur
- Control: SLM – al-Nur
- Elevation: 847 m (2,779 ft)
- Time zone: Central Africa Time, GMT + 3

Tawila or Tawilah (Arabic: طويلة) is both a town and a locality in North Darfur State, Sudan, about 60 kilometers west of El Fasher, that since 2004 has become an important site for internally displaced people.

Tawila was originally a prosperous town inhabited mainly by Fur people, with a busy market and important production of tombac, vegetables and cereals. The town became a major site in the Darfur conflict after fighting began in 2003. In February 2004, Janjaweed militiamen attacked Tawila, reportedly killing civilians and committing widespread sexual violence. Later that year, the town was seized by the Sudan Liberation Army. The attacks caused residents to flee to El Fasher and nearby camps, while Tawila was looted and left almost completely destroyed.

Although the town itself was largely deserted, camps for internally displaced people developed nearby and later became more permanent settlements. After the seizure by the Rapid Support Forces of Zamzam camp in April 2025, hundreds of thousands of people fled to Tawila, creating a major humanitarian crisis marked by severe shortages of food, water, sanitation, shelter and healthcare. Further displacement followed the El Fasher massacre in October 2025, and by the end of November the wider Tawila area hosted about 700,000 internally displaced people.

== History ==
Tawila is a town in Tawila locality, North Darfur, about 60 kilometres from El Fasher. It lies in a valley crossed by a wadi (a river valley that contains water only when heavy rain occurs) that expands during the rainy season from June to October. The surrounding farmland is used by nomadic pastoralists moving livestock in search of pasture. In the hotter months before the rains, temperatures can exceed 40 °C.

Tawila had about 40,000 inhabitants, most of them from the Fur tribe, and was described as a prosperous town with many brick warehouses, residential buildings and a busy market. Local agriculture included tombac, a valuable type of chewing tobacco, as well as vegetables and cereals such as sorghum. Tombac was an especially important cash crop.

=== 2004 attacks ===
Tawila became a major site in the Darfur conflict after fighting began in 2003. The town was attacked in February 2004 by Janjaweed militiamen, who were reported to have killed residents, raped schoolgirls and female teachers, and branded some women after the rapes. In November 2004, Tawila was attacked again and seized by the rebel Sudan Liberation Army. After the attacks, residents fled to camps east of El Fasher or to El Fasher itself. The town was looted and left almost completely destroyed.

Although Tawila town was deserted, camps developed nearby for many thousands of internally displaced persons (IDPs) from Tawila locality and other conflict-affected areas. The main tribes in the camps were Fur, Zaghawa and Tunjur. The UN-African Union Mission in Darfur established a base in the area, and MSF provided medical services.

The camps initially consisted of makeshift shelters made from sticks and plastic sheeting, but later developed into more permanent settlements with straw and mud huts. Their populations rose and fell with changes in the fighting, including major arrivals of displaced people in 2012 and 2016.

=== Farmer-herder conflicts ===
In 2012, conflicts repeatedly arose when armed herders drove livestock onto cultivated land, damaging crops and sometimes attacking farmers who attempted to prevent them. In July 2019, Radio Dabanga reported that it had documented numerous attacks on displaced farmers across Darfur over the preceding years, many of them in Tawila locality. In 2019, Tawila residents held several demonstrations against the recurring attacks by armed herders in the area.

By 2021, population estimates for Tawila locality included roughly 12,000 IDP households in camps, nearly 4,000 households with people who had returned to their area of origin, and fewer than 3,000 non-displaced households. A substantial proportion of households were headed by women, and about two thirds of households were food-insecure. Farming was the main source of livelihood for most households, and access to land was an important cause of conflict. Insecurity often made travel outside Tawila difficult, including on the road to El Fasher.

=== Sudanese civil war ===
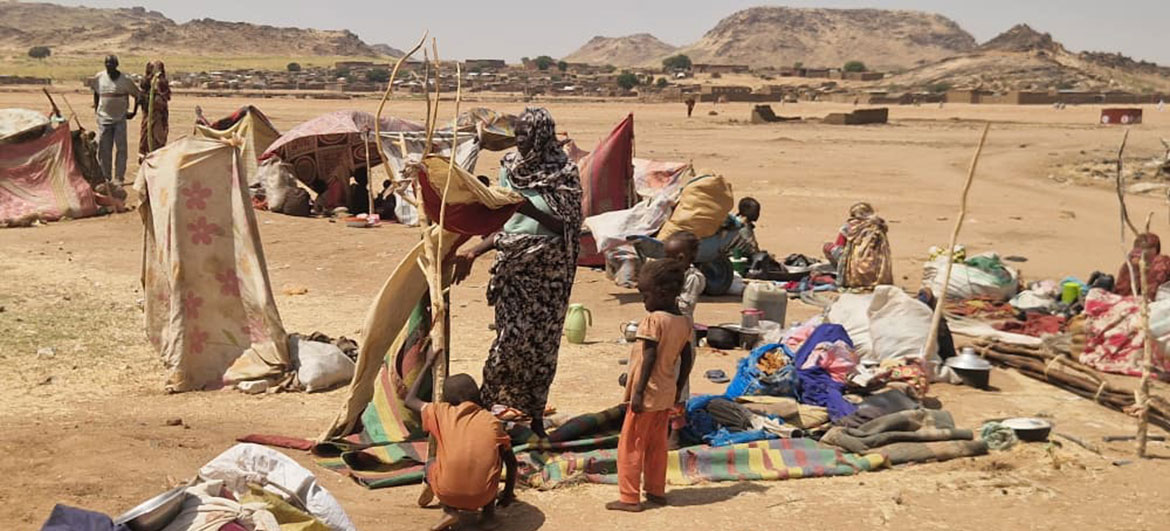
Tawila IDP site for newly displaced people from El Fasher, 2025

After the war between the Sudanese Armed Forces (SAF) and the Rapid Support Forces (RSF) broke out in April 2023, armed confrontations happened also in Tawila. For instance, on 19 June 2023, the RSF seized an SAF garrison in Tawila, killing a number of soldiers. On 23 September 2023, the Sudan Liberation Movement (al-Nur) took control of the town after the army and the RSF had withdrawn.

Before the war, Tawila had six IDP camps. After the fighting began, nearly twenty thousand civilians were displaced from the town, and by September 2024, six additional IDP camps had been opened. That month, at least ten children a day were reported to be dying from starvation in Tawila. Hunger was not the only cause of death. Malaria, measles and whooping cough were also spreading rapidly, while others died during labour or from untreated injuries sustained during fighting.

==== Attacks on Zamzam camp ====
On 18 February 2025, an RSF attack on Zamzam camp reportedly forced thousands of people to flee to Tawila. On 12 and 13 April 2025, the RSF launched a violent assault on Zamzam and seized control of the camp. After the takeover, people fled the camp, with nearly 379,000 going to Tawila, about 60 km from Zamzam. The majority of them were women, children, and people with disabilities. They travelled for many hours or days with little or no water and food, arriving severely dehydrated, malnourished and traumatised. Later reports documented sexual and gender-based violence during the flight.

By July 2025, there were more than 380,000 IDPs in Tawila, including 327,000 people who were driven from Zamzam camp and nearby areas after fighting broke out there in mid-April. This sharp increase in people had pushed the town into a major humanitarian crisis. Four new camps had been established but humanitarian resources were stretched thin. Food shortages were severe, with most families eating one meal a day or less. Water and sanitation were severely inadequate: only about 10% of the people in the four new camps had access to reliable water, and even fewer had latrines. The limited number of temporary learning spaces left many children unable to attend classes. OCHA warned that the health situation in North Darfur was worsening, as health facilities closing because of insecurity, shortages of vaccines, medicines and surgical supplies, while cases of cholera, measles and malaria were increasing in the Tawila area. OCHA scaled up its response plan to support the displaced people in Tawila, mobilizing food, healthcare, water, sanitation, shelter and protection; the plan required about US$120 million.

Tawila was among the worst-hit areas in Darfur’s cholera outbreak. By mid-September 2025, Tawila reported the highest infection rates with 5,457 cases and 79 deaths.

At the end of September 2025, Tawila hosted about 652,000 residents and was Sudan's largest IDP area, hosting 7% of the country's IDPs.

==== El Fasher massacre ====
Beginning on 26 October 2025, the RSF carried out a genocidal massacre in El Fasher, with tens of thousands of civilians killed. From 26 to 31 October, more than 36,000 people fled to Tawila. Upon arrival, families families described severe violence before and during their flight, including rape and other sexual violence, and parents searched for missing children. By the end of November, the wider Tawila area hosted about 700,000 IDPs, rising to 715,000 by June 2026.

Most displaced people in Tawila lived in informal settlements with inadequate sanitation, and only a small minority had regular access to safe water. Diseases linked to poor water and sanitation, including malaria, respiratory infections, diarrhoea and other waterborne diseases, were increasing sharply. Food access was also severely limited, with most families having poor or borderline food consumption and many displaced people expected to remain in acute food insecurity.

On 24 April 2026, a drone strike destroyed a vehicle transporting emergency shelter kits for the United Nations High Commissioner for Refugees (UNHCR) to Tawila.
