= Food insecurity and famine in South Sudan =

Food insecurity has been a persistent and recurrent crisis in South Sudan since independence in 2011. Early conditions fluctuated between stressed and crisis levels, with localized emergencies along the Sudan border. Although good rainfall and harvests in 2012 brought temporary improvements, the civil war that began in December 2013 severely disrupted agriculture, displaced millions, and sharply worsened food security. By 2014 and 2015, about one third of the population faced crisis or emergency levels.

Conditions deteriorated further in 2016 amid conflict, economic collapse, high food prices, and restricted humanitarian access. In February 2017, famine was declared in parts of Unity and Northern Bahr el Ghazal States. Around 4.9 million people required urgent assistance, and more than one million children were acutely malnourished. Although expanded humanitarian operations helped contain the famine by mid 2017, severe food insecurity persisted.

From 2018 onward, between 5 million and 6 million people were regularly classified in crisis or emergency phases, driven by ongoing insecurity, displacement, economic decline, erratic rainfall, flooding, and pest outbreaks. After the civil war, food insecurity remained extremely high, affecting over half the population in some years. Despite periods of modest improvement, renewed conflict, climate shocks, economic deterioration, and the arrival of returnees and refugees from Sudan led to further deterioration in 2024 and 2025, with around 6 million people still facing acute food insecurity.

== Background ==
Transport map of Unity State (January 2013)

Oil and gas concessions in Sudan, 2004. Block 5A lies in the central part of Unity State.

=== Famine globally ===
No famine had been formally declared anywhere in the world during the six years prior to 2017. That year there were warnings of imminent famine in Yemen, Somalia, and the northeastern part of Nigeria, but the formal declaration requires that the following criteria be met:

- 20% of households suffer extreme food shortages.
- 30% of the population suffers extreme malnutrition.
- At least 1 per each 5,000 inhabitants die per day.

A formal declaration of famine indicates that deaths from hunger have already begun to occur.

=== 1998 famine in the region ===
Before South Sudan’s independence, the area was affected by the 1998 Sudan famine. Bahr el Ghazal was the region most severely impacted. The famine there was driven by a combination of a two-year drought, a ban on humanitarian airdrops, restrictions on movement of displaced persons, confiscation of cattle and destruction of food stores.

Unity State experienced looting and burning, as well as the displacement of its inhabitants, during the fighting over oil reserves in the years leading up to the 1998 famine, as part of the Second Sudanese Civil War. In 1998, an estimated 12,000 people died of starvation in the Block 5A area alone, out of a population of approximately 240,000, while a further 160,000 people were forcibly displaced.

=== Insecurity ===
In 2013, the South Sudanese Civil War broke out in 2013 as a multi-sided conflict between the government and opposition forces, causing ethnic massacres and forced displacement. This conflict was identified by international humanitarian advocates as the driver of the famine, which they described as man made.

Since 2013, insecurity limited people's access to their livelihoods such as farmlands, grazing lands, and fishing areas. More than 3 million people had been displaced by ongoing violence across the country, forcing families to abandon agricultural land and livestock, leaving them with few food resources to survive with. The worst fighting was in Unity State, where tens of thousands of people fled their homes due to a government offensive against opposition-held areas.

A 2016 UN report described the former Unity State as the site of continuous fighting throughout the civil war because it has "great economic and symbolic importance because of its vast oil resources and also as a predominantly Nuer state, in a conflict that has pitted the two dominant tribes, Dinkas and Nuers, against each other". Instability is a major reason for the low oil production in South Sudan since 2012.

It has been argued that political rivalries were exacerbated by ethnic animosities, which led to violence and, consequently a famine.

=== Reduced agricultural production ===
The conflict that began in 2013 also had a damaging effect on agricultural production across much of the country. Assessments indicated a sustained decline in cereal output since 2014, caused by less production per household in several areas and by the displacement of farming families who fled the country. The share of households engaged in farming also fell over time, reflecting the loss of productive assets through looting, distress sales, or displacement away from land and equipment.

Prolonged conflict severely depleted livestock holdings among poorer households, weakening an essential source of nutrition and income. Widespread looting and insecurity contributed to a marked reduction in access to milking cows, particularly in areas most affected by fighting. There was a sustained erosion of livestock based livelihoods, with some regions experiencing especially acute losses that further intensified food insecurity.

=== Inflation and poverty ===
High inflation in South Sudan was driven by the monetization of the fiscal deficit by the Bank of South Sudan. Inflation peaked at 550% in 2016 before easing as the pace of money printing slowed, falling to about 102% the following year. Inflation severely constrained household purchasing power, leaving many families in both urban and rural areas unable to afford even minimum food needs.

The erosion of real wages contributed to a sharp increase in urban poverty, with 70% falling below the poverty line. As employment opportunities diminished, many working age people withdrew from the labor market, while others increasingly relied on informal work and coping strategies to support their households amid ongoing political instability.

=== Climate change ===
Although conflict was the principal driver of the famine in South Sudan, climate change also contributed to food insecurity, particularly in parts of the eastern region. The country experienced prolonged droughts, increasingly unreliable rainfall patterns, and rising temperatures. Over the past three decades, the country was among the fastest warming regions globally, with average temperatures increasing by up to 0.4°C per decade, a rate roughly two and a half times higher than the global average. Also rainfall declined by about 10 to 20%, making the climate drier. Some parts of South Sudan did not have rain in two years.

These prolonged drought conditions contributed to repeated food crises, livestock losses, internal displacement, cross border migration, and a sharp rise in humanitarian needs.

== Food insecurity ==
=== Early food insecurity ===
From the establishment of South Sudan as a state in 2011, the IPC classified food insecurity in the country at stressed levels, corresponding to phase 2, with an estimated 24.5% of the population experiencing pressure on their food security. Famine reportedly led to deaths in Bentiu and Latjoor states in mid-2011, though the state governments of both denied hunger there was severe enough to cause fatalities.

In April 2012, food insecurity was slightly below the seasonal average, although conditions varied by area. Populations living along the border with Sudan, about 10% of the population, were assessed to be in phase 4, "emergency". Food insecurity at the time was driven by unfavorable terms of trade for livestock holders, increased reliance on markets during the lean season, conflict related displacement along the border, high food prices linked to the devaluation of the South Sudanese pound, border closures with Sudan, persistent insecurity from cattle raiding, and the arrival of refugees and returnees from Sudan. In November that same year, the food situation was improved compared to a year ago, largely due to better rainfall and a good harvest.

This positive trend continued in July 2013. Still, more than 1.6 million South Sudanese were in phase 3, "crisis" or above. The following year, however, saw a substantial deterioration compared with the previous year. More than 3.5 million people, about 30% of the population, were classified in crisis or emergency food insecurity, (IPC phases 3 and 4). The civil war that began in December 2013 disrupted agricultural activities by preventing farmers from planting seeds or forcing them to abandon their fields after planting. Severe flooding during the rainy season further aggravated the situation. Food insecurity conditions during this period varied considerably across the country, with the three most conflict affected states, Upper Nile, Jonglei, and Unity, experiencing significantly more severe conditions than the other seven states of South Sudan. Food security showed seasonal improvement in mid-2014, particularly in areas not affected by conflict, due to normal rainfall, good crop performance, and the start of the green harvest. However, displacement in Greater Upper Nile limited planting and reduced cereal production. Despite gains since mid 2014, food insecurity remained well above normal for a harvest period, with about 1.5 million people projected to remain in crisis or emergency, many relying on coping strategies such as kinship support and asset depletion.

=== Deteriorating food insecurity ===
In June 2015, the Famine Early Warning Systems Network observed a spike in food prices and an increase in the number of households likely to face catastrophic famine, driven by currency depreciation and reduced import capacity.

In September 2015, reports from Leer County, the home of rebel leader Riek Machar, described widespread destruction of farms and cattle, large scale displacement, millions experiencing hunger and illness. They also noted reliance on food drops in inaccessible areas and deaths from malnutrition in the overcrowded UN camp in Bentiu. Less rain during the rainy season contributed in part by lowering crop yields and in part by reducing the length of a traditional pause in fighting for the rainy season.

By September 2015, an estimated 3.9 million people, about one third of the population, were severely food insecure. Conditions had worsened sharply compared with the previous year, with particular concern for around 30,000 people in Unity State experiencing catastrophe and at risk of famine. The lasting impact of conflict, high food prices, erratic rainfall, weakened livelihood systems, and restricted humanitarian access continued to strain food security across much of the country, including areas previously considered relatively stable. Food insecurity expanded for the first time into the Greater Equatoria region, driven by market disruption, economic decline, insecurity, and area specific crop losses. The economic decline pushed food prices to exceptionally high levels, which sharply reduced household purchasing power. Ongoing conflict continued to disrupt livelihoods through displacement.

The food and nutrition security situation worsened markedly across much of South Sudan in early 2016. By April, an estimated 4.3 million people were classified in IPC phases 3, 4, or 5, a sharp increase compared with both early 2016 and the same period the previous year. The decline was largely attributed to lack of physical security, economic deterioration, and the exhaustion of household food stocks from the previous harvest. The UN concluded that the pattern of abuses by the South Sudan Army, including confiscating cattle and other possessions, "suggests a deliberate strategy to deprive the civilians living in the area of any form of livelihood or material support." Displaced populations, returnees, and low income households with limited assets and purchasing power were among the most affected, including significant numbers of food insecure urban residents. Despite seasonal increases in food availability, the number of people experiencing food insecurity rose to about 4.4 million by August.

This had severe consequences for children. Nationally, only 6% of children aged 6 to 23 months received a minimum acceptable diet, and just 16% of infants aged 6 to 8 months were introduced to complementary foods on time. These inadequate feeding practices undermined healthy growth and development, while 42% of children under five experienced at least one common childhood illness, further worsening nutritional outcomes.

In January 2017, food security conditions in South Sudan continued to worsen.

=== Famine ===
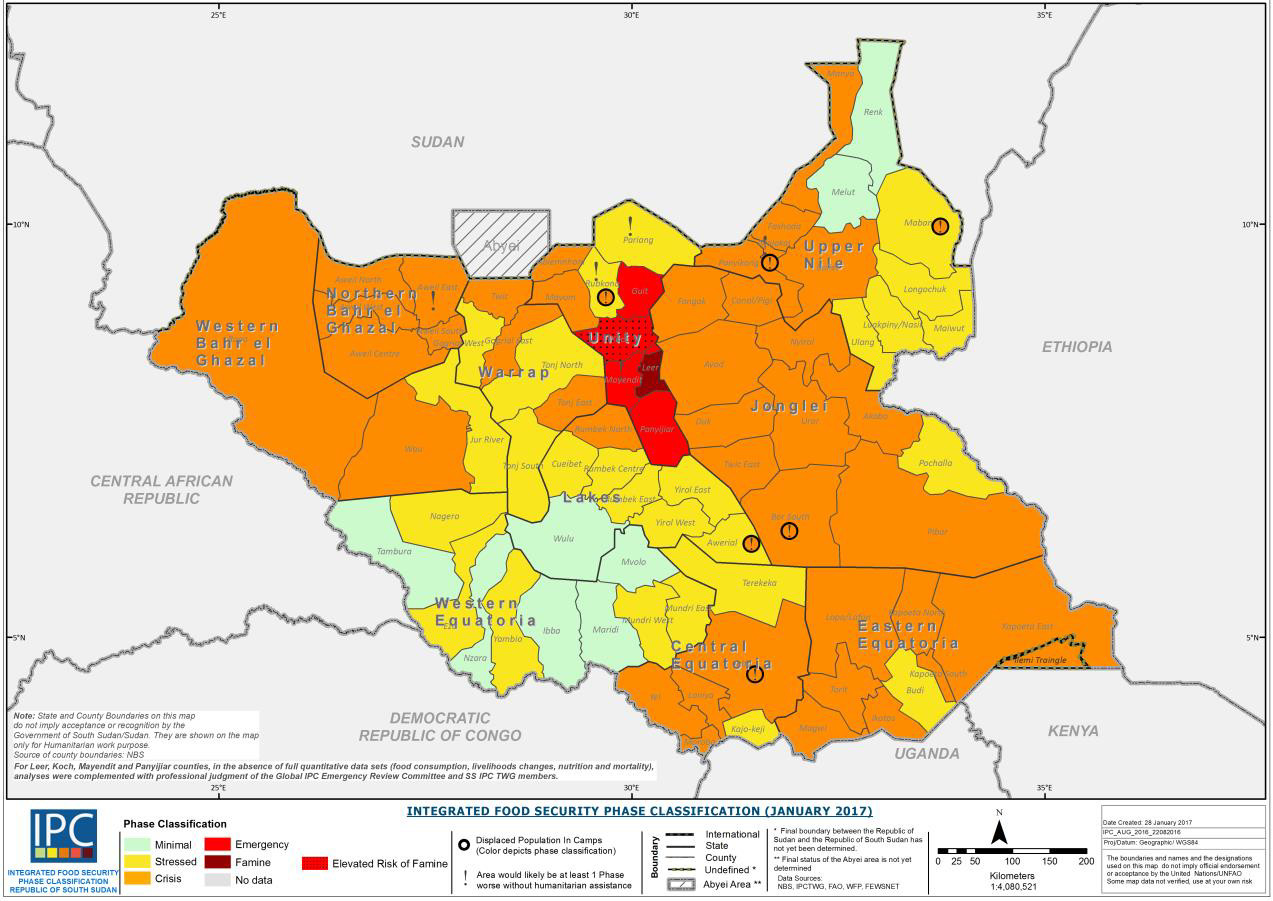
January 2017 map with phase classifications from "minimal" to "famine"

On 20 February 2017, the United Nations declared a famine in Unity and Northern Bahr el Ghazal States of South Sudan and warned that it could spread rapidly without further action. A formal declaration of famine indicates that deaths from hunger had already begun to occur. Assessments indicated that 67% of the population, or about 4.9 million people, urgently required food, agriculture, and nutrition assistance, and at least 100,000 people were estimated to be in imminent danger of death by starvation.

An Integrated Food Security Phase Classification (IPC) analysis covering 23 counties found that 14 recorded global acute malnutrition levels of at least 15%. Global acute malnutrition levels above 30% were reported in Leer and Panyijar, while Mayendit recorded a rate of 27.3%. A similarly deteriorating nutrition situation, atypical for the post harvest season, was observed in the Greater Equatoria region, particularly in Greater Central Equatoria.

The famine disproportionately affected internally displaced persons and host communities that were already impacted by the ongoing conflict. More than one million children were estimated to be acutely malnourished across the country, with over a quarter of a million already suffering from severe acute malnutrition.

United Nations Food and Agriculture Organization representative Serge Tissot said: "Our worst fears have been realised. Many families have exhausted every means they have to survive. The people are predominantly farmers and war has disrupted agriculture. They’ve lost their livestock, even their farming tools. For months there has been a total reliance on whatever plants they can find and fish they can catch."

The expansion of humanitarian assistance played a key role in containing the famine. By June 2017, the food crisis had subsided and the UN considered the famine to be over, while still pointing out that 1.7 million people were facing the level of food insecurity just below famine.

=== Continued food insecurity after the famine ===
Food insecurity did not stop once the famine was declared over in June 2017. By September 2017, acute malnutrition had worsened compared with the previous year, with several counties recording extremely critical levels.

In January 2018, 5.3 million people, nearly half the population, were in Crisis or Emergency levels of food insecurity, a roughly 40% increase compared with the previous year. The deterioration was mainly driven by long running conflict and displacement, which reduced crop production, disrupted livelihoods, and coincided with continued macroeconomic decline. Livelihoods were further weakened by extreme weather events, including prolonged dry spells and flooding, as well as crop damaging pest outbreaks such as fall armyworm. By mid-2018, violence during the lean season pushed 6.1 million people, nearly two thirds of the population, into severe food insecurity, including 1.7 million at immediate risk of famine. The share of people classified in Emergency and Catastrophe phases increased, indicating worsening severity. During the first 10 months of 2018 there were as many severe acute malnutrition admissions to outpatient therapeutic programs as there were in 2017. However, by September 2018, conditions showed modest improvement, and no county exceeded the extreme critical malnutrition threshold of 30%.

In January 2019, more than 6 million people experienced acute food insecurity, including around 30,000 people in IPC Phase 5, Catastrophe. Conditions were driven by conflict, displacement, economic crisis, erratic rainfall resulting in poor harvests, which undermined livelihoods and limited food availability. By August 2019, the number of people in acute food insecurity had risen to 6.35 million, although in January 2020, the share of the population facing acute food insecurity was about 9% lower than at the same time the previous year.

Acute malnutrition among children under five increased markedly between 2018 and 2019, rising from 13% to 16%, which exceeded the emergency threshold of 15%. Poor diet quality, flooding, reduced access to safe drinking water, and outbreaks such as malaria and measles contributed to the deterioration.

Extensive humanitarian operations across large parts of the country played a decisive role in averting an even worse crisis. Still, despite substantial humanitarian efforts, assistance has not kept pace with sustained high levels of need. In the period around 2017 and 2018, the shortfall between required support and aid delivered widened as humanitarian needs grew faster than the expansion of assistance.

One factor contributing to this shortfall was the severe restriction of humanitarian access, with an estimated 18 of South Sudan’s 78 former counties largely or fully inaccessible by late 2018. Another factor was insufficient financing; funding for food security and livelihoods cluster peaked in 2014 and declined in the years that followed.

=== After the civil war ===
During the fall of 2020, an estimated 6.35 million people, about 52.6% of the population, faced acute food insecurity. During this period, the impacts of COVID-19 and related control measures compounded existing drivers, further worsening conditions. No IPC report was issued during 2021. By early 2022, the number affected had risen to 6.83 million, and by autumn 2022, it had declined to 6.6 million people. One year later, the number of people facing acute food insecurity had further declined to 5.83 million. However, during the autumn of 2024, conditions related to acute food insecurity and malnutrition in South Sudan worsened again. Economic decline, recurrent weather extremes, particularly extensive flooding, together with ongoing conflict and insecurity all contributed to the deterioration. Additional strain was placed on the country by the arrival of returnees and refugees fleeing the war in Sudan. About 6.3 million people were assessed to be experiencing acute food insecurity. Within this group, approximately 41,000 people were classified as IPC Phase 5 Catastrophe, including populations in Malakal County and tens of thousands of South Sudanese returnees who had fled the conflict in Sudan.

In autumn 2025, acute food insecurity and malnutrition in South Sudan remained at extremely high levels. Conditions were driven mainly by localized conflict and widening insecurity that displaced large populations, alongside widespread flooding that disrupted livelihoods and agricultural production. During this period, an estimated 5.97 million people were facing high levels of acute food insecurity.

== Effects ==
1.2 million children under five years of age were severely malnourished. Increases in acute malnutrition are due to serious food insecurity, widespread conflict and displacement, poor access to services, high morbidity, extremely poor diets, and poor sanitation and hygiene. In the former counties of Renk, Nyirol, Duk, Twic East and Pibor (Greater Upper Nile region) during the March–May period, Global Acute Malnutrition rates were over 20 percent, which was above WHO's 15-percent emergency threshold.

The period of the lean season between May and July and the ongoing conflicts continuously worsened the famine. Members of a working group including South Sudanese and UN officials called this year "the toughest year on record.” By September, relentless conflicts and the lean season pushed 6.1 million people - nearly 60 percent of the population – into extreme hunger. “More than 6 million lives shattered by hunger are just too many,” said Pierre Gauthier, FAO's Acting Representative in South Sudan. “Assessment after assessment, we find that conflict is the main driver of this desperate situation, making it impossible for farmers to get back on their feet. We are reaching as many people as we can, in almost every county, but it is critical to end the conflict and sustain peace to prevent an already severe food insecurity situation from deteriorating even further. This IPC demonstrates clearly that if the people of South Sudan have peace, they will be able to improve their own resilience and food security situation.”

== Responses (2017) ==
A mass humanitarian effort focused on responding to the famine declaration. Still, there were significant challenges for agencies delivering food in famine affected areas. Fighting prevented civilians from reaching food distribution sites. In other cases, civilians reported that food they received was taken by soldiers involved in the fighting. UN officials said President Salva Kiir was blocking food deliveries to some areas, though Kiir said on 21 February that the government would allow "unimpeded access" to aid organizations.

=== Government of South Sudan ===
Days after the declaration of famine, the government raised the price of a business visa from $100 to $10,000, mostly aimed at aid workers, citing a need to increase government revenue. U.N. officials said that President Salva Kiir was blocking food deliveries to some areas.

=== United Nations ===
In 2016 several UN agencies and other relief agencies intensified their efforts, setting a new record for post-independence South Sudan by reaching four million people with 265,000 metric tons of food assistance and $13.8 million in cash assistance. According to the UN Children's Fund Deputy Executive Director and UN Assistant Secretary General Justin Forsyth, "Nobody should be dying of starvation in 2017. There is enough food in the world, we have enough capability in terms of the humanitarian community. In South Sudan, UNICEF has 620 feeding centres for severely malnourished children, so the places where children are dying are places we can't get to, or get to only occasionally. If there was access, we could save all of these children's lives." Furthermore, UNICEF warned that more than 1 million children in South Sudan are subjected to malnutrition.

The World Food Programme carried out relief operations throughout the war, mitigating the risk of famine in other areas including the Northern Bahr el Ghazal state.

=== European Union ===
In February 2017 the United Kingdom said that it would issue £100 million sterling in aid to South Sudan in 2017, while the European Union pledged to provide 82 million EUR.

=== Canada ===
In March 2017, the Canadian government announced 37 million CAD in funding for UN agencies and non-governmental humanitarian organizations working to address famine in South Sudan. In June 2017, the Canadian government pledged another, additional, 86 million CAD in funding to assist in the response to South Sudan's famine and conflict.

== Responses (2018) ==
=== United Nations ===
Many UN officials believed that man-made conflicts caused the high levels of widespread hunger across the country. The Food and Agriculture Organization of the United Nations (FAO), the United Nations Children's Fund (UNICEF) and World Food Programme (WFP), therefore, called for a sustainable peace across the country, and unhindered, safe access to all areas where people who survived the fighting but are left with nothing, and need life-saving assistance. In addition, these three UN organizations offered assistance to address the food crisis through various strategies.

==== The Food and Agriculture Organization of the United Nations (FAO) ====
FAO attempted to restore the country's agriculture sector by supporting the farmers with seeds and tools. By the end of September, FAO already distributed over 4,800 tons of crop seeds to approximately 1.4 million farmers. Because many South Sudanese relied on their livestocks to survive, FAO also subsidized the fishermen and pastoralists, including providing essential animal health services to protect livestocks.

==== The United Nations Children's Fund (UNICEF) ====
Since the beginning of 2018, numerous outpatient treatment programmes (OTP) and stabilization centers established by the UNICEF admitted 147,421 children who suffered from severe acute malnutrition. This number represents 69% of the 215,312 target for 2018 and 55% of the 269,140 Severe Acute Malnutrition caseload for this year. 89% of these children fully recovered from this devastating epidemic.

==== World Food Programme ====
World Food Programme (WFP), the food-assistance branch of the United Nations and the world's largest humanitarian organization addressing hunger and promoting food security, resumed the integrated rapid response mechanism (IRRM).

As of January 2018, WFP already sent seven teams in Bilkey, Nyandit, Kurwai, Jaibor, Chuil, Buot and Ulang, providing life-saving food and nutrition assistance to around 96,633 people, including 17,370 children under the age of five. Moreover, WFP plans to deploy an additional 26 missions in February and March, targeting close to 400,000. In addition to providing immediate services, the IRRM establishes a framework of humanitarian access, which enables partners to establish longer-term presence in disaster-affected locations.

WFP aided the population with life-saving emergency food supplies, food in return for work to construct and rehabilitate community assets, and food for school meals. It also provided special medications for the prevention and treatment of malnutrition in children, and pregnant and nursing women. So far in 2018, WFP had distributed 30,000 tons of food and utilized US$2.9 million in cash-based transfers to help more than 3.1 million South Sudanese people.

WFP Executive Director David Beasley warned in December 2019 that South Sudan's food security situation was in "trouble, serious trouble" after flooding and conflicts, and that immediate action was needed to stave off famine in 2020.

=== Oxfam ===
Oxfam is a confederation of 20 independent charitable organizations focusing on the alleviation of global poverty, founded in 1942 and led by Oxfam International. It is a major nonprofit group with an extensive collection of operations. Oxfam is on the ground racing to get food, water and hygiene items to the most vulnerable people in the region of Sudan, South Sudan, Uganda, and Ethiopia. It is providing regular emergency food distributions, clean water, safe sanitation facilities, and essential hygiene items to help keep diseases at bay. Also, it is supporting people to produce food and make a living for themselves. Specifically, they train people on improving their farming methods and deliver assets like livestock, tools, seeds, and fishing gear. Likewise, they distribute cash and vouchers to families for use in markets. Lastly, they support traders to build better links between communities.

== See also ==
- List of famines
