= Zamzam camp =

Former IDP camp in Sudan

Zamzam camp معسكر زمزم للنازحين
- former IDP camp
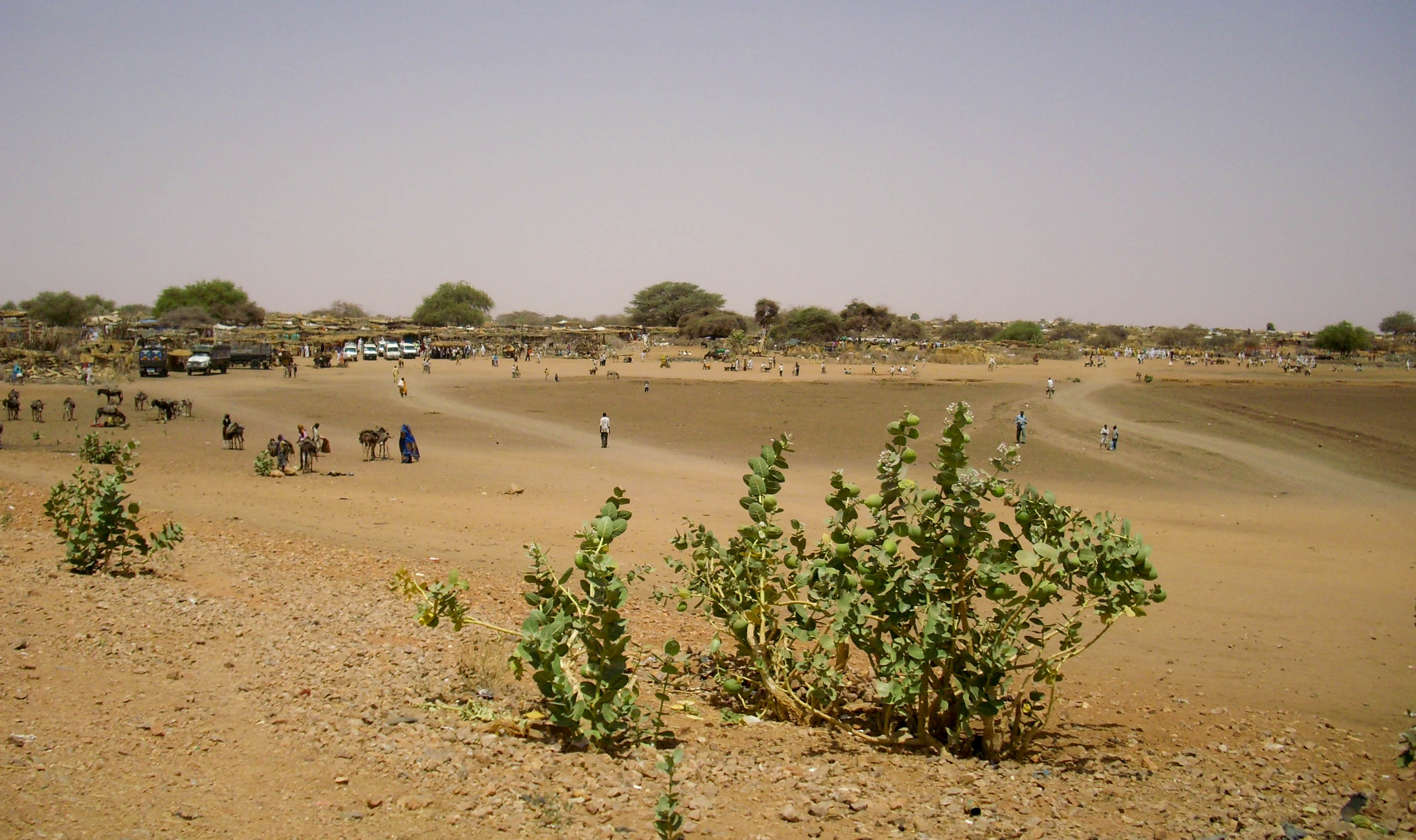
- Zamzam IDP camp in 2006

- Location in Sudan
- Coordinates: 13°29′18.68″N 25°18′38.4″E
- Country: Sudan
- State: North Darfur
- Founded: 2004
- Status: Former IDP camp, converted into a military base in 2025
- Control: Rapid Support Forces

Population (2025, before RSF takeover)
  - Total: 500,000
- Time zone: UTC+2 (Central Africa Time)

The Zamzam camp (Arabic: معسكر زمزم للنازحين) was one of the largest internally displaced persons (IDP) camps in Sudan, located 15 kilometres (9.3 mi) south of El Fasher, North Darfur. It was established in 2004 to accommodate the massive influx of people displaced by the war in Darfur. Since the outbreak of the Sudanese civil war in 2023, conditions in the camp had deteriorated severely, with a catastrophic malnutrition crisis, famine-like situations and high child mortality. Experts described the crisis as man-made and preventable. By 2024, the camp housed approximately 500,000 displaced individuals.

Since April 2024, the Rapid Support Forces (RSF) repeatedly attacked Zamzam and Abu Shouk camps, leading to a massacre. On 13 April 2025, the RSF seized control of the camp, forcing its 400,000 residents to flee again. Many fled towards Tawila, travelling for many hours or days with little or no water and food, arriving there severely dehydrated, malnourished and traumatised. Later reports documented sexual and gender-based violence during the flight. The RSF converted the camp into a military base.

== Foundation and early years ==
The Zamzam refugee camp was established in 2004, situated approximately 15 kilometres (9.3 mi) from the city of El Fasher, the capital of North Darfur, to accommodate the influx of internally displaced persons (IDPs) fleeing violence and persecution during the Darfur conflict, which erupted in 2003. The conflict involved various armed groups, including the Sudanese government and Janjaweed militias, leading to widespread atrocities against civilians, including ethnic cleansing and mass killings. The United Nations estimates that over 2.5 million people have been displaced due to the conflict, with Zamzam being one of the significant camps providing refuge to these vulnerable populations. The camp has grown significantly over the years, with estimates suggesting that it houses tens of thousands of residents, primarily from the Fur, Zaghawa, and Masalit ethnic groups.

Zamzam camp has been subjected to numerous raids after its establishment. On January 14 2015, RSF backed by local militiamen stormed the Zamzam camp looting it in the process. During the raid 3 people were killed and around 15,000 heads of livestock stolen.

Humanitarian organisations, including the United Nations High Commissioner for Refugees (UNHCR) and various non-governmental organizations (NGOs), provide essential services. The COVID-19 pandemic has further complicated the situation, as the camp's overcrowded conditions make it difficult to implement effective health measures, increasing the risk of outbreaks. The Zamzam camp has a high rates of malnutrition, communicable diseases, and maternal and child mortality among the camp's population compared to the general Sudanese population. Moreover, many individuals experience trauma, anxiety, and depression, which are often exacerbated as mental health services are scarce, and the stigma surrounding mental health issues further complicates access to care.

In Zamzam camp, many families depend on external assistance as employment opportunities are limited, and the camp's economy is largely informal, characterized by small-scale trade and subsistence agriculture. Initiatives aimed at improving education, vocational training, and livelihood opportunities are being implemented, albeit on a limited scale.

By 2025, the Zamzam camp consisted of multiple neighborhoods and areas, including the Labado and Ahmadai neighborhoods, Ammar Jadid and Saloma Square. Important structures included the Relief International clinic, Médecins Sans Frontières hospital and the central market.

== Sudanese civil war (2023–present) ==
The Sudanese conflict severely impacted Zamzam camp, pushing it into famine conditions. The conflict, primarily between the Sudanese Armed Forces (SAF) and the Rapid Support Forces (RSF), caused significant displacement, and the camp's population grew to abound 500,000 people, many of them women and children.

Conditions in Zamzam were dire, with high rates of malnutrition and mortality, particularly among children. Médecins Sans Frontières (MSF) has reported alarming levels of acute malnutrition and a high number of child deaths, with at least one child dying every two hours. The camp's residents faced severe shortages of food, clean water, and medical supplies. Restrictions and blockades hindered the delivery of essential aid, exacerbating the crisis. In August 2024, famine conditions were present in parts of North Darfur, including Zamzam camp. That same month, the SAF also bombed the camp, killing children. Counsellors in Zamzam camp reported an increasing number of victims seeking support for sexual violence, most of them teenage girls.

=== Attacks, massacre and RSF takeover ===
From early January 2025, the Rapid Support Forces (RSF) reportedly blockaded Zamzam camp, controlling exit and supply routes and preventing food, medical supplies and fuel from entering. The blockade caused severe shortages of food and other essential goods, and people trying to bring in supplies at night were repeatedly attacked and killed. RSF restrictions and security threats forced several major humanitarian organisations to suspend operations in Zamzam camp in February 2025, amongst them MSF and World Food Programme, worsening an already severe humanitarian situation

In April 2024, the (RSF) repeatedly attacked Zamzam and Abu Shouk camps. The attacks culminated in a massacre, when a violent RSF offensive against Zamzam from 11 to 13 April 2025 killed at least 1,013 civilians and injured hundreds more. Reports described RSF fighters firing on civilians and committing killings, rape, kidnappings and arson during the assault. On 13 April 2025, the RSF seized control of the camp. According to the RSF the takeover of the camp was meant "to secure civilians and humanitarian medical workers" but the UN refuted this by stating that RSF had killed 9 aid workers during the takeover. Later reports documented widespread killings, rape, sexual violence and torture during the takeover, describing a pattern of serious violations of international humanitarian law during the takeover. A gang rape of 39 people was documented. There were also reported abductions during the attack on Zamzam and as people fled. The RSF deliberately set fires that destroyed large parts of the area. According to the UN Human Rights Office over 1,000 civilians were killed during the Zamzam camp takeover and that at least 319 people had been executed while escaping the camp.

After the takeover, about 400,000 people were estimated to have fled Zamzam camp between 13 and 14 April. Around 70 percent of the camps inhabitants went towards Tawila, 60 km from Zamzam, while others sought safety in other IDP camps or in neighbouring countries. Displaced people described travelling for many hours or days with little or no food and water, often with children, elderly relatives, or injured family members. Some older people with limited mobility were left behind.

Survivors reported seeing bodies along the routes and said that some people, including children, died from injuries, dehydration or lack of food while fleeing. Médecins Sans Frontières said that displaced people arriving in Tawila were severely dehydrated, malnourished and traumatised. Medical care during the journeys was extremely limited, and a nurse described people bleeding to death or dying before they reached treatment. Reports indicated that sexual and gender-based violence was common during the flight from Zamzam to Tawila.

On 29 April 2025, an RSF-allied militia abducted 40 aid workers and about 50 civilians who were evacuating the camp. The RSF converted the camp into a military base. Reportedly, not all residents were able to leave Zamzam. The RSF was accused of using civilians in the camp as human shields to deter a possible SAF counterattack.

Testimonies and verified video footage indicated that, within two weeks of taking Zamzam camp, the RSF moved the remaining inhabitants, including older people, people with disabilities and people with chronic health conditions, to other locations in Darfur. Reports also said that after the camp had been emptied, the RSF reopened previously blocked roads, including trade routes to Zamzam.

== See also ==
- 2024 famine in Sudan
- Humanitarian impact of the Sudanese civil war (2023–present)
