= 1988 Sudan famine =

Famine in Sudan (1988)

1998 Sudan famine
- Bahr el Ghazal
- Date: 1988
- Location: Sudan (esp. Bahr el Ghazal)
- Type: famine
- Deaths: 250,000+

The 1988 famine in Bahr el Ghazal, Sudan, also called cok makurup was a large humanitarian disaster in Bahr el Ghazal which killed around 250,000 people. The famine was caused by looting, raiding, displacement, killing, and abduction of Dinka by government funded Arab Muraheleen.

== Background ==
The famine happened during the Second Sudanese Civil War which had started after the breakdown of 1972 Addis Ababa Agreement. The Government of Sudan (GoS) and Sudan People's Liberation Army (SPLA) clashed heavily with each other. The war was also marked by increasing ethnic violence between different South Sudanese tribes. The Sudanese government was using notably brutal Baggara militas to squash the rebellion in the south.

== Causes ==
=== Government of Sudan ===
The Sudanese government actively denied humanitarian organisations access to South Sudan and made it significantly harder for non-governmental organizationss (NGOs) to operate in Southern Sudan. The GoS also made a decision in 1986 which allowed local army commanders and government officials to misappropriate and obstruct food relief. The GoS funded the Muraheleen, which were tribal militias primarily composed of Rizeigat and Messiria tribes from the Darfur region. Mureheleen were especially targeting Dinkas as they were regarded as the civil base for SPLA operations. Muraheleen were usually moved to Wau using trains. There they conducted raids on Dinka villages taking villagers as slaves and burning the villages. The 1988 Sudan floods also decreased the aid going to Southern Sudan as it was diverted back to Khartoum.

=== Sudan People's Liberation Army ===
The SPLA denied possible humanitarian aid by laying siege on government garrison towns and blocking relief efforts to Juba. The SPLA also shot down relief airplanes and attacked road and river convoys of humanitarian aid. The SPLA obstructed or distorted commercial food markets and prevented famine-stricken populations from searching in the bush for wild foods. These policies combined made the civilians vulnerable to large-scale famine.

== Effects ==
The famine decimated the population of Bahr el Ghazal and especially Dinka tribes were affected by the fighting. The Dinka called the famine cok makurup meaning hunger of collapse. United Nations estimates that during the famine which happened from 1986 to 1988 between 400,000 and 500,000 thousand people died of which 250,000 thousand did during 1988. The famine also displaced three million. The famine was followed by heavy rainfall from 1990 to 1991, this caused crop failure and worsened the ongoing situation. The 1988 famine also paved way for the 1998 famine in Bahr el Ghazal in which 70,000 ended up dying.

== Operation Lifeline Sudan ==
The devastation of the famine lead to the formation of Operation Lifeline Sudan (OLS). It was a large coordinated relief effort between UNICEF the World Food Programme (WFP), as well as 35 other NGOs. OLS was described as a UN "umbrella organization" that would grant both diplomatic legitimacy and operational capacity to humanitarian aid distributed to both sides of the Civil War. The agreement also established "corridors of tranquility" Which allowed safe transportation and distribution of essential food aid.

== See also ==
- 1993 Sudan famine
- 1998 Sudan famine
- Food insecurity and famine in South Sudan
