= 1993 Sudan famine =

1993 famine in Sudan

In 1993, a famine in Sudan occurred amidst political unrest and the then ongoing Second Sudanese Civil War.

== Aftermath ==
In Kongor, the famine killed 20,000 and made 100,000 people leave the region.

== The vulture and the little girl ==
This famine was the subject of Pulitzer Prize-winning photography The Vulture and the Little Girl taken by South African photojournalist Kevin Carter. Carter died by suicide shortly after being awarded the prize, possibly a result of trauma from witnessing the effects of the famine first-hand.

== See also ==
- 1988 Sudan famine
- 1998 Sudan famine
- Food insecurity and famine in South Sudan

== Sources ==
- "SUDAN". Human Rights Watch.
