= Famine Early Warning Systems Network =

USAID website

FEWS NET, the Famine Early Warning Systems Network, is a leading global provider of timely, accurate, evidence-based, and transparent early warning information and analysis of current and future acute food insecurity. FEWS NET informs decisions on humanitarian planning and responses in the world’s most food-insecure countries.

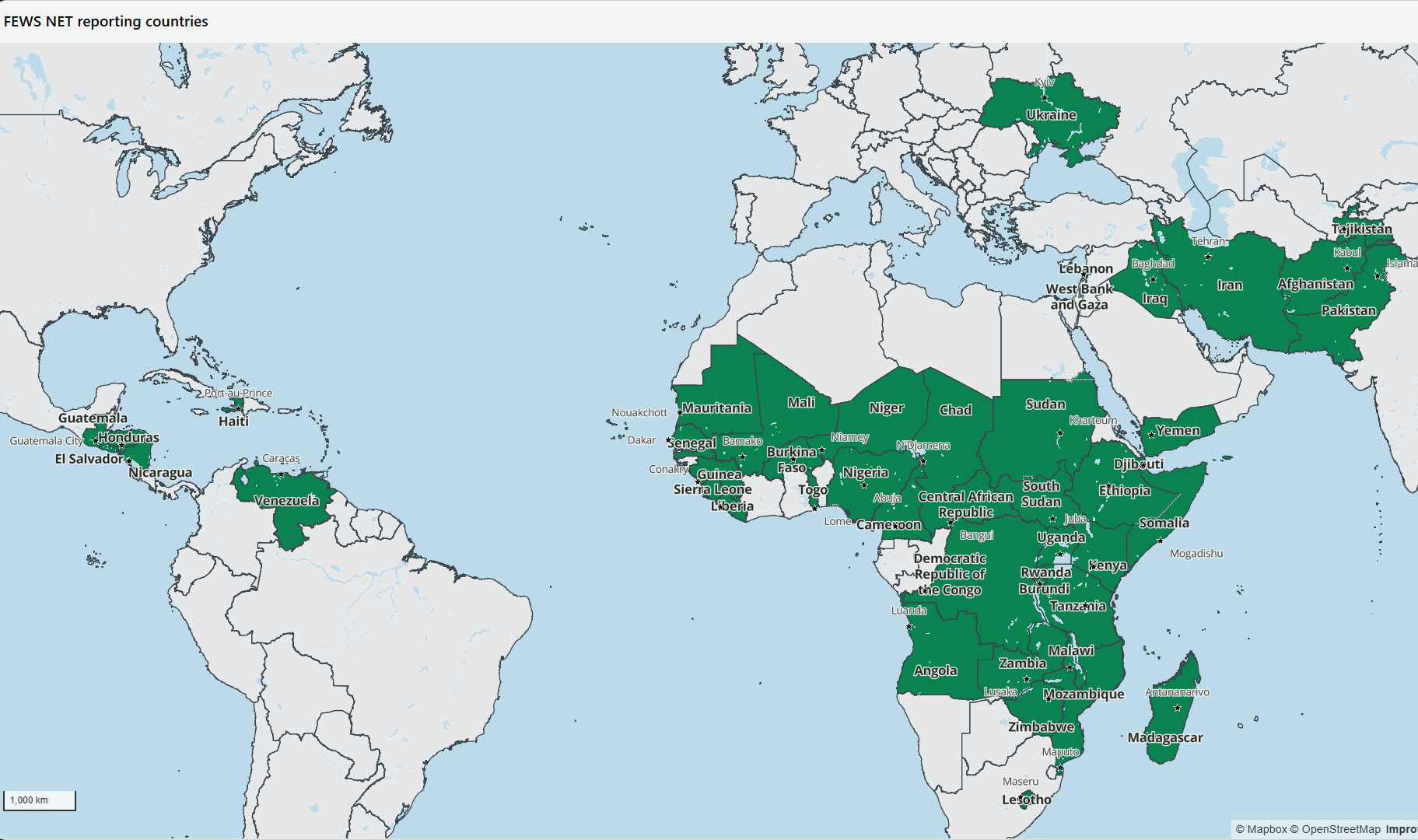
FEWS NET coverage map (2026)

The United States Agency for International Development (USAID) created FEWS NET in 1985 in response to famines in East and West Africa and a critical need for better and earlier warning of potential food security crises.

For four decades, FEWS NET and its partners have continued to monitor the increasingly complex factors influencing food insecurity, such as weather and climate, conflict, agricultural production, markets and trade, and nutrition. Considered together within the context of local livelihoods, FEWS NET provides integrated food security analysis that forecasts outcomes six to twelve months in advance.

FEWS NET currently sits under the United States Department of State’s Bureau of Disaster and Humanitarian Response.

== History ==
FEWS NET was created in response to the 1984 - 1985 famines in Sudan and Ethiopia, which resulted in the deaths of as many as 1 million people. From the beginning, the aim of the early warning system, then called "FEWS", was to anticipate impending famines and advise policy makers on how to prevent or mitigate such famines. In July 2000, the initiative's name was changed to the Famine Early Warning Systems Network, or FEWS NET, to signal the importance of collaborating with and strengthening national local food security information systems.

In 2008, Molly E. Brown argued that during its twenty years of activity, FEWS NET had been extremely successful. She said that it was widely viewed as "the most effective program in existence for providing information to governments about impending food crises".

An independent study published in 2021 showed that FEWS NET projections are accurate in about 84% of cases, with higher accuracy at lower levels of food insecurity (over 93%). However, accuracy declines at more severe levels, with a tendency to over-predict, with over-projection persisting even after accounting for humanitarian interventions.

The system was shut down in January 2025 by the Department of Government Efficiency of the second Trump administration. It resumed operations in June 2025.

== Aims ==
FEWS NET provides information to governments, international relief agencies, NGOs, journalists, and researchers planning for, responding to, and reporting on humanitarian crises. With support from a technical team in Washington, D.C., FEWS NET staff based in more than 20 country offices collaborate with US government agencies, national government ministries and international partners to collect data and produce objective, forward-looking analysis on the world's most food-insecure countries. Using an integrated approach that considers climate, agriculture production, prices, trade, nutrition, and other factors, together with an understanding of local livelihoods, FEWS NET forecasts most likely outcomes and anticipates change six to twelve months in advance. To help decision-makers and relief agencies plan for food emergencies, FEWS NET publishes monthly reports (available on its web site) on current and projected food insecurity, up-to-the-minute alerts on emerging or likely crises, and specialized reports on weather hazards, crops, market prices, and food assistance.

In 2010, to mark its 25th anniversary, FEWS NET produced a video to document its work.

== Methods ==
FEWS NET reporting focuses on acute food insecurity—sudden and/or short-term household food deficits caused by shocks—rather than chronic food insecurity, ongoing or cyclical food deficits related to persistent poverty and a lack of assets. In general, food insecurity is rarely the result of one causal factor. The strength and reliability of FEWS NET forecasting lies in its integrated consideration of the diversity of factors that lead to risk. Along with agricultural production, climate and weather, FEWS NET places analytical importance on markets and trade, livelihoods and sociopolitical issues such as conflict and humanitarian response. Key elements of FEWS NET's method include:

- Classifying food insecurity: FEWS NET describes the severity of food insecurity using the Integrated Food Security Phase Classification system, an international five-level scale. FEWS NET representatives were among the international food security leaders who designed the scale.
- Scenario development is at the heart of FEWS NET's analytical process. In the simplest terms, scenario development can be described as a sophisticated "if-then" statement. In practice, this nine-step method relies on the creation of specific, informed assumptions about future events, their effects, and the likely responses of various actors. Considered in the context of current conditions and local livelihoods, these assumptions allow for the estimation of future food security outcomes and easy updating of the scenario as new information becomes available.
- Remote monitoring: Since the 2008 global food price crisis, the risk of food insecurity has continued to rise in unexpected places. In 2010, FEWS NET responded to the demand for information on these new areas of concern by developing a lighter, scalable version of its traditional method. This approach, known as remote monitoring, centers on the identification and monitoring of anomalies that might lead to food insecurity. In remote monitoring, a FEWS NET coordinator covers a portfolio of countries, typically from a nearby regional office. Relying on a network of partners to collect and share data, the coordinator analyzes available information and produces monthly, two-page reports describing the current and projected food security situation.

== Partners ==
Other US agencies and technical partners make integral analytical contributions to FEWS NET reports. They include:

- The US Geological Survey, which provides regular agroclimatology reports and technical advice on vegetation, water availability and other environmental and climate issues. Along with US-based staff, three USGS scientists in East, West and Southern Africa, offer analysis specific to those regions.
- The National Oceanic and Atmospheric Administration, through the Climate Prediction Center, provides rainfall estimates (RFEs) and atmospheric monitoring of weather patterns such as El Nino and La Nina events.
- NASA satellites provide imagery and raw data for USGS and NOAA analysis.
- The US Department of Agriculture, through the Foreign Agricultural Service, partners with FEWS NET on crop assessments and other agriculture-related activities.
- The University of California, Santa Barbara Climate Hazards Center produces and delivers climate data, monitoring, and forecasts that are used in FEWS NET’s early warning analysis.
- NASA Harvest and University of Maryland partners provide satellite-based agricultural monitoring and analysis to assess crop conditions and support food security early warning.

Chemonics, an international development company, supports FEWS NET's home office in Washington DC, as well as some 80 field-based staff, most of whom are nationals of the countries in which they work. These FEWS NET staff conduct integrated food security analysis and provide expertise on the diverse drivers of food insecurity in various geographies.

The American Institutes for Research (AIR), manages FEWS NET’s Data, Learning, and Communications Hub, which serves the FEWS NET team and the global food security community with the technology platforms and strategies necessary to manage, analyze, and disseminate FEWS NET data, information, knowledge products, and learning.

FEWS NET works closely with partners in the food security community, including international organizations such as the World Food Program and Food and Agriculture Organization, national ministries of agriculture, and trade and national weather services. In certain countries, partnerships may involve joint reporting, joint field assessments and/or collaborative analysis. Examples of these partners include Comité permanent Inter-Etats de Lutte contre la Sécheresse dans le Sahel in West Africa and the Food Security and Nutrition Analysis Unit in Somalia.
