= Integrated Food Security Phase Classification =

1-to-5 scale for food insecurity

The Integrated Food Security Phase Classification (IPC), also known as IPC scale, is a tool for improving food security analysis and decision-making. It is a standardised scale that integrates food security, nutrition and livelihood information into a statement about the nature and severity of a crisis and implications for strategic response.

The IPC was originally developed in 2004 for use in Somalia by the United Nations Food and Agriculture Organization's Food Security Analysis Unit (FSAU). Several national governments and international agencies, including CARE International, European Commission Joint Research Centre (EC JRC), Food and Agricultural Organization of the United Nations (FAO), USAID/FEWS NET, Oxfam GB, Save the Children UK/US, and United Nations World Food Programme (WFP), have been working together to adapt it to other food security contexts.

== Technical Working Groups and Famine Review Committee ==
The IPC process begins with an in-country Technical Working Group hosted by the government and including other national stakeholders such as UN agencies and non-governmental organizations.

In some countries affected by conflict, areas may be inaccessible and data unavailable. An independent Famine Review Committee can then be activated to support the Technical Working Group and validate its conclusions. The work of the IPC's Famine Review Committee is funded by development aid programs from the EU, the UK, Canada, and Germany. The Committee is composed of international experts who are not affiliated with national governments or local political interests, and its mandate is to conduct analyses based solely on technical and scientific criteria.

== IPC scale ==
The following IPC reference tables list the general profiles of the elements for each phase or level respectively for the three IPC unintegrated classification scales, which together constitute the IPC "big picture" classification scale:

=== Acute Food Insecurity ===
This classification is intended to guide decision-making for short-term improvements in food security.

		IPC severity phase 1 None/Minimal (Note: Description: Households (Note: According to the parameter twenty percent rule for area classification included in Acute Food Insecurity and Chronic Food Insecurity classifications, such is the set qualifying population threshold according to a specific phase or level respectively.) are able to meet essential food and non-food needs without engaging in atypical and unsustainable strategies to access food and income.)	IPC severity phase 2 Stressed (Note: Description: Households have minimally adequate food consumption but are unable to afford some essential non-food expenditures without engaging in stresscoping strategies.)	IPC severity phase 3 Crisis (Note: Description: Households either: Have food consumption gaps that are reflected by high or above-usual acute malnutrition; or; Are marginally able to meet minimum food needs but only by depleting essential livelihood assets or through crisis-coping strategies)	IPC severity phase 4 Emergency (Note: Description: Households either: Have large food consumption gaps which are reflected in very high acute malnutrition and excess mortality; or; Are able to mitigate large food consumption gaps but only by employing emergency livelihood strategies and asset liquidation.)	IPC severity phase 5 Catastrophe/Famine (Note: Description: Households have an extreme lack of food and/or other basic needs even after full employment of coping strategies. Starvation, death, destitution and extremely critical acute malnutrition levels are evident. […] (For Famine Classification, an area needs to have extreme critical levels of acute malnutrition and mortality.))
First-level outcome	Food consumption (focus on energy intake)	Adequate	Minimally adequate	Moderately inadequate	Very inadequate	Extremely inadequate
First-level outcome	Livelihood change (assets and strategies)	Sustainable	Stressed	Accelerated depletion	Extreme depletion	Near collapse of strategies and assets
Second-level outcome	Nutritional status	Minimal	Alert	Serious	Critical	Extremely critical
Second-level outcome	Mortality	CDR: <0.5 / 10,000 / day	CDR <0.5 / 10,000 / day	CDR <0.5 - 0.99 / 10,000 / day	CDR <1 - 1.99 / 10,000 / day	CDR >2 / 10,000 / day
Contributing factors	Food availability, access utilization and stability	Adequate	Borderline adequate	Inadequate	Very inadequate	Extremely inadequate
Contributing factors	Hazards and vulnerability	None or minimal effects	Stressed livelihoods and food consumption	Results in assets and food losses	Results in large food assets and food losses	Results in near complete collapse of livelihood assets

=== Chronic Food Insecurity ===
This classification is intended to guide decision-making for medium-term improvements in food security.

		Level 1 No/Minimal (Note: Description: "In a common year, households are continuously able to access and consume a diet of acceptable quantity and quality for an active and healthy life. Household livelihoods are sustainable and resilient to shocks. Households are not likely to have stunted children.")	Level 2 Mild (Note: Description: "In a common year, households are able to access a diet of adequate quantity but do not always consume a diet of adequate quality. Household livelihoods are borderline sustainable, and resilience to shocks is limited. Households are not likely to have stunted children.")	Level 3 Moderate (Note: Description: "In a common year, households have ongoing mild deficits in food quantity and/or seasonal food quantity deficits for 2 to 4 months of the year, and consistently do not consume a diet of adequate quality. Household livelihoods are marginally sustainable, and their resilience to shocks is very limited. Households are likely to have moderately stunted children.")	Level 4 Severe (Note: Description: "In a common year, households have seasonal deficits in quantity of food for more than 4 months of the year and consistently do not consume a diet of adequate quality. Household livelihoods are very marginal and are not resilient. Households are likely to have severely stunted children.")
First-level outcome	Food consumption - Quality of diet	Adequate	Moderately inadequate	Inadequate	Inadequate
First-level outcome	Food consumption - Quantity of diet	Adequate	Adequate	Mildly inadequate	Moderately inadequate
Second-level outcome	Nutritional status - Presence of chronically malnourished member	No/Minimal	Not likely	Likely members moderately malnourished	Likely members severely malnourished
Contributing factors	Household's livelihoods (strategies and assets)	Sustainable	Borderline sustainable	Marginally sustainable	Very marginal
Contributing factors	Household's resilience to common shocks	Adequate	Limited	Very limited	Inadequate

=== Acute Malnutrition ===
This classification is intended to guide decision-making on priority areas and interventions to reduce acute malnutrition.

	IPC severity phase 1 Acceptable (Note: Description: Less than 5% of children are acutely malnourished.)	IPC severity phase 2 Alert (Note: Description: 5-9.9% of children are acutely malnourished.)	IPC severity phase 3 Serious (Note: Description: 10-14.9% of children are acutely malnourished.)	IPC severity phase 4 Critical (Note: Description: 15-29.9% of children are acutely malnourished. The mortality and morbidity levels are elevated or increasing. Individual food consumption is likely to be compromised.)	IPC severity phase 5 Extremely Critical (Note: Description: 30% or more children are acutely malnourished. Widespread morbidity and/or very large individual food consumption gaps are likely evident.)
Global Acute Malnutrition (GAM) based on weight for height Z-score (WHZ)	<5%	5 to 9.9%	10 to 14.9%	15 to 29.9%	≥30%
Global Acute Malnutrition (GAM) based on mid-upper arm circumference (MUAC) (Note: GAM based on MUAC must only be used in the absence of GAM based on WHZ; the final IPC Acute Malnutrition phase with GAM based on MUAC should be supported by an analysis of the relationship between WHZ and MUAC in the area of analysis and also by using convergence of evidence with contributing factors. In exceptional conditions where GAM based on MUAC is significantly higher than GAM based on WHZ (i.e. two or more phases), both GAM based on WHZ, and GAM based on MUAC should be considered, and the final phase should be determined with convergence of evidence.)	<5%	<5 to 9.9%	5 to 14.9%	≥10%	≥15%

== Notable applications ==
The Integrated Food Security Phase Classification (IPC) has been used in several countries to assess and respond to food insecurity, each presenting unique challenges and responses.

=== Ethiopia ===
In Ethiopia, the 2021 IPC analysis highlighted a severe food insecurity crisis, with over 5.5 million people in Tigray, Amhara, and Afar facing high levels of acute food insecurity due to conflict, displacement, and disrupted markets. As of May 2021, approximately 3.1 million were in Crisis (IPC Phase 3), 2.1 million were in Emergency (IPC Phase 4) and 353,000 were experiencing Catastrophe (IPC Phase 5).

=== Sudan ===
In Sudan, the April–May 2024 IPC analysis indicated severe food insecurity, with 25.6 million people facing Crisis (IPC Phase 3) or worse. A total of 8.5 million are facing Emergency (IPC Phase 4), and 755,000 people Catastrophe (IPC Phase 5). Key factors include ongoing conflict and limited humanitarian access, particularly in Greater Darfur and Kordofan regions. The analysis warns of possible famine if conditions deteriorate, particularly for displaced populations and refugees in conflict-affected areas.

=== Congo ===
The July–December 2024 IPC analysis for the Democratic Republic of the Congo (DRC) indicates severe food insecurity affecting 25.6 million people, categorized as Crisis (IPC Phase 3) or worse. Among them, 3.1 million face Emergency (IPC Phase 4) conditions, particularly in conflict-impacted provinces like North Kivu, Ituri, and South Kivu. Projected conditions from January to June 2025 suggest similar challenges due to ongoing armed conflict, economic instability, and high food prices. Displaced populations remain especially vulnerable.

=== Gaza Strip ===
The IPC scale has been used to monitor the humanitarian crisis in Gaza since the beginning of the Gaza war in October 2023. According to the impact snapshot published on 30 July 2025 by the UN office for the Coordination of Humanitarian Affairs (OCHA), 100% of the population is projected to face acute levels of food insecurity classified in IPC Phase 3 or above, including one million facing Phase 4 and 470,000 facing Phase 5. This is significantly worsened since the September–October 2024 IPC report, when 1.84 million people were facing Crisis (IPC Phase 3) or worse conditions, but only 6 percent of Gazans face IPC Phase 5 food insecurity, which was the lowest figure reported since the start of the famine. Israel placed Gaza under total siege during March and April 2025, and was forced to allow in minimal food under increasing pressure from the international community, but mass starvation continues to worsen. Famine was confirmed and projected to expand by IPC as of 15 August 2025 with a third of the population expected to face IPC Phase 5 famine, 58 percent facing IPC Phase 4 emergency, and 20 percent facing IPC Phase 3 crisis. It is the first time that the IPC has recorded a famine outside of Africa.

=== Somalia ===
As of July–September 2024, an estimated 4.4 million people in Somalia are experiencing high levels of acute food insecurity (IPC Phase 3 or above), with around 1.6 million children likely to suffer from acute malnutrition. While recent rainfall improved agricultural conditions, localized floods and ongoing conflict still hinder food access and agricultural production. Despite these challenges, there is a slight improvement from the previous year. The IPC's projections for October–December 2024 suggest ongoing needs for humanitarian assistance, particularly for vulnerable populations in crisis and emergency phase.

=== Yemen ===
The latest IPC analysis for Yemen, covering July 2024 to February 2025, highlights severe food insecurity affecting nearly half of the population in government-controlled areas. From July to September 2024, about 4.7 million people faced Crisis (IPC Phase 3) or Emergency (IPC Phase 4) levels of food insecurity. The economic decline, persistent conflict, and irregular humanitarian aid remain key drivers of food insecurity, worsened by recent floods in August 2024. A marginal improvement is anticipated, but humanitarian aid is crucial to prevent further deterioration.

== Key challenges and limitations ==
The challenges of the IPC scale include data quality issues, particularly in conflict zones or areas with limited access for data collection. This often leads to reliance on available but sometimes unreliable data. There are also challenges with subjective interpretation, as expert judgment is required in cases where data is sparse or inconsistent. Furthermore, the IPC's reliance on evidence convergence means that contradictory data can arise, complicating consensus-building and analysis.

== See also ==
- Famine scales
- Global Acute Malnutrition
