= 1998 Sudan famine =

- Date: 1998
- Location: Sudan (esp. Bahr el Ghazal)
- Type: famine
- Deaths: 70,000+

The famine in Sudan in 1998 was a humanitarian disaster caused mainly by the Second Sudanese Civil War, including attacks on civilians, mass displacement, the destruction and seizure of food resources, and restrictions on humanitarian aid, with drought linked to El Niño as a contributing factor. The worst affected area was Bahr el Ghazal in southwestern Sudan. In this region over 70,000 people died during the famine.

== Causes ==
The 1998 Sudan famine had multiple causes, including the Second Sudanese Civil War, which severely affected civilian life. During the civil war, agricultural production and food supplies were disrupted by the destruction of crops and food supplies, cattle theft and mass displacement. Many people were forced to leave their agricultural lands and livestock, which reduced the agricultural production significantly. The scale of displacement further intensified the crisis, as communities were forced into areas with limited access to markets, healthcare, and sanitation services.

A lack of security across commerce and supply routes made these situations worse by further limiting the flow of food into affected regions. At the same time, in the Bahr El Ghazal region, armed groups raided many times and burnt villages, looted the supplies and destroyed many resources that are essential for civilians. Especially, conflicts during the cultivation period in 1997 led to shortages and scarcity in the region, contributing to famine in 1998.

The famine was also linked indirectly to the war economy, as resources were directed towards weapons and medical supplies etc., rather than support for agriculture and farming. In Bahr El Ghazal, the crisis was worsenened by a lack of strong government intervention, and poor cooperation between the government in the North and authorities in the South.

Furthermore, instability disrupted Sudan's economy by limiting trade and supply routes. The inflation rate increased significantly, and rising food prices reduced the accessibility of food even where there was a sufficient supply. At the same time environmental factors contributed to famine as well; especially drought with El Niño reduced the rainfall and productivity of agricultural lands during the growing season in 1997.

Subsequent analyses concluded that the famine conditions were largely human-induced, driven by deliberate military strategies and systematic obstruction of humanitarian relief. A Human Rights Watch report described systematic war-related human rights abuses as the direct cause of the famine in Bahr el Ghazal, naming the Sudanese government, allied muraheleen militias, the SPLA and forces led by Kerubino Kuanyin Bol as responsible actors. It said the famine resulted from attacks on civilians, displacement, and the destruction or seizure of resources needed for survival, including cattle, grain, and land. The report also described the abduction of women and children by militias.

== International help ==
Throughout the conflict, access to humanitarian aid was extremely limited. Despite the fact that Operation Lifeline Sudan was created to make international assistance distribution easier, they continued fighting and shifting frontlines, as well as administrative limitations imposed by conflict parties frequently caused aid operations to be delayed or blocked.

The government of Omar al-Bashir often restricted international aid through official permit requirements, which delayed deliveries and restricted the assistance to the regions controlled by rebellion groups, exacerbating the scarcity in the Sudan.

International humanitarian efforts, while extensive, were insufficient to fully offset the combined effects of conflict, displacement, and restricted access, leaving large populations in prolonged states of acute food insecurity.

== Effects ==
The effects on the region were enormous, with the excess mortality estimated at about 70,000 people. Many more are thought to have been displaced, with over 72,000 people reported as migrating from the threatened rural zones to Wau alone from May 1998 to August 1998.

Health and nutrition surveys conducted in affected regions documented high levels of acute malnutrition, particularly among children, alongside increased vulnerability to disease due to deteriorating living conditions.

== Aftermath ==
A ceasefire was signed on July 15, 1998, some eight months after the Sudanese government had first warned of a possible famine. After numerous extensions, this ceasefire lasted nearly a year, until April 1999. However, the Baggara militia continued to ignore the ceasefire, reducing the ability of aid agencies to help. Thanks to a good crop and this ceasefire, however, the situation was brought under control by the end of 1998. However, the area has remained in trouble and a number of famine warnings have come since the end of 1998.

== See also ==
- Darfur conflict
- Food insecurity and famine in South Sudan
- 1988 Sudan famine
- 1993 Sudan famine
- Famine in Sudan (2024–present)
