= Siham Hassan =

Sudanese politician (died 2025)

- سهام حسن
- Born: North Darfur, Sudan
- Died: 26 October 2025; Al-Fashir, North Darfur, Sudan
- Cause of death: Gunshot wounds
- Known for: Youngest elected MP in Sudanese history

Siham Hassan Husballah (Arabic: سهام حسن حسب الله; died 26 October 2025) was a Sudanese human rights activist and politician. She served two terms as a member of parliament in the National Assembly of Sudan between 2016 and 2019, representing Darfur.

== Early life and education ==
Hassan was born and raised in North Darfur, Sudan. In 2006, she graduated from University of Zalingei with a degree in physics. Hassan lived in Al-Fashir.

== Political career ==
Hassan was a member of the Justice and Liberation Party. In 2011, she was one of the signatories of the Darfur Peace Agreement, signed in Doha, between the Sudanese government and the Liberation and Justice Movement.

She was elected as a member of parliament in 2016, becoming the youngest person to be elected in the history of Sudan. Hassan served two terms as an MP before parliament was dissolved following the 2019 coup d'état. During her time as an MP, she advocated for the people of Darfur, bringing attention to ongoing violence in the region and raising urgent questions with government ministers about the situation there, describing ongoing episodes of "heinous and flagrant violations of human rights". Hassan accused the central government of lacking a clear vision or strategy for addressing the instability in Darfur; she criticised the 2016 Darfurian status referendum as drawing attention away from the need to promote a national dialogue in Darfur to establish peace.

After her term concluded, Hassan expressed regret that she had been unable to improve the welfare of Sudanese people, particularly in Darfur, blaming this on partisan politics among her fellow parliamentarians. After her death, she was recognised by Medameek for playing an important role in the 2017 arrest of the war lord Musa Hilal after she submitted an urgent question to the Minister of Defence, Salem Ali Salem, about crimes being committed by Hilal against civilians. Hassan was also recognised for speaking out on women's issues, calling on Omar al-Bashir to ensure gender equality to different ethnicities and regions in Sudan.

== Sudanese civil war and death ==
After leaving parliament, Hassan moved back to Al-Fashir, where she ran a takaya, a community kitchen that fed the hungry in the city, particularly following the outbreak of the Sudanese civil war in 2023.

During the war, Hassan received threats from militias associated with the Rapid Support Forces, though opted to remain in Al-Fashir. In June 2024, she was arrested by the intelligence forces of the Sudan Liberation Movement/Army, a Darfuri rebel group in conflict against the RSF. Hassan was detained for nine days, during which time it was alleged she had been whipped and verbally abused. The SLM denied having been involved in her detention.

In October 2025, the Rapid Support Forces gained control of Al-Fashir following a year-long siege. It was subsequently reported that Hassan had been among a group of people killed late on 26 October in what witnesses described as a targeted attack in the neighbourhood in which she lived. It was reported that many takaya volunteers had been killed during the occupation of the city.

The Sudanese Doctors Network called the killings of Hassan and others in Al-Fashir a "heinous massacre" and an "act of ethnic cleansing".
