= United Nations Security Council Resolution 2003 =

UN Security Council Resolution 2003
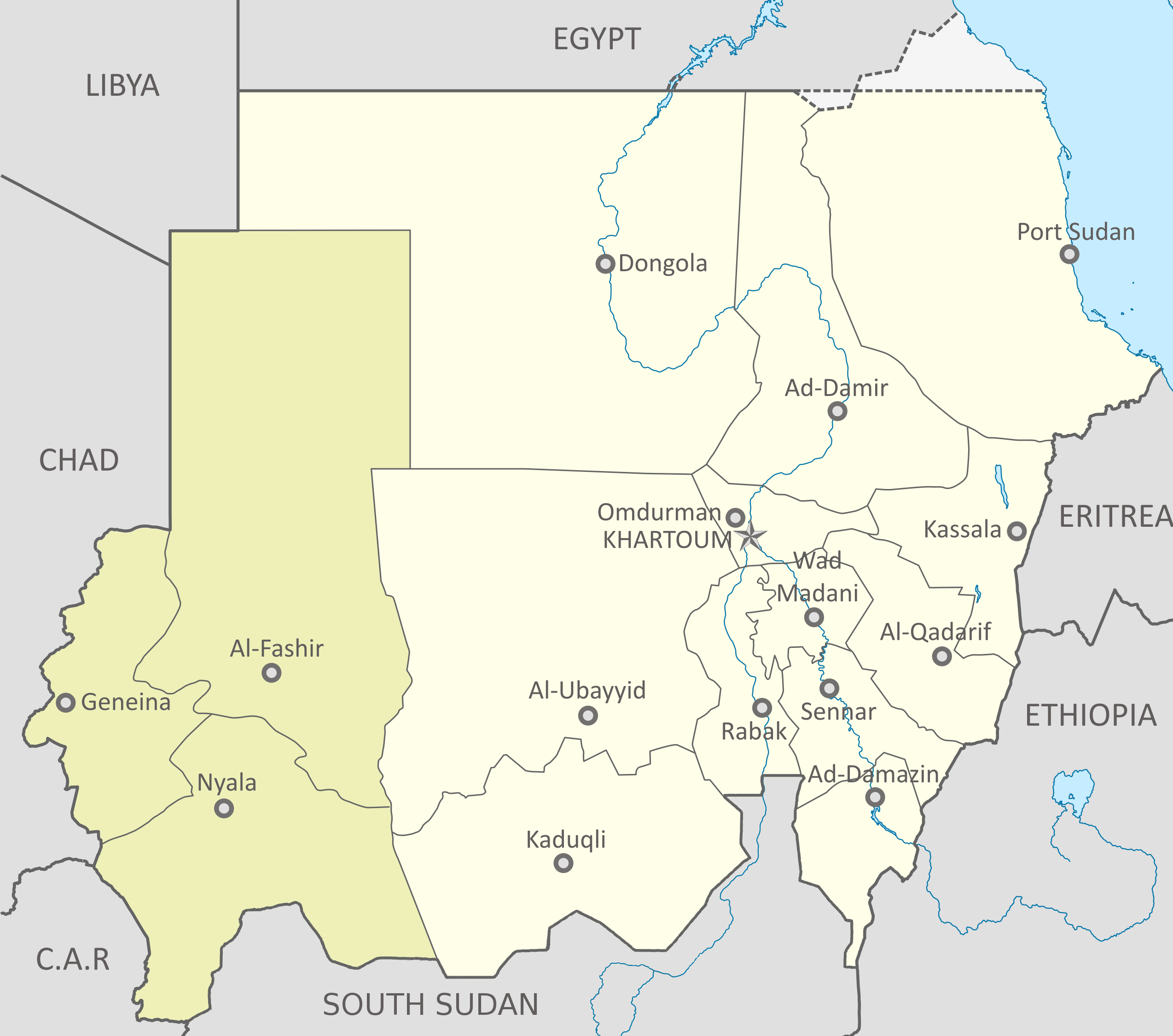
- Darfur in Sudan
- Date: 29 July 2011
- Meeting no.: 6,597
- Code: S/RES/2003 (Document)
- Subject: The situation in Sudan
- Voting summary: 15 voted for; None voted against; None abstained
- Result: Adopted

Security Council composition
- Permanent members: China; France; Russia; United Kingdom; United States
- Non-permanent members: Bosnia–Herzegovina; Brazil; Colombia; Germany; Gabon; India; Lebanon; Nigeria; Portugal; South Africa

United Nations Security Council Resolution 2003, adopted unanimously on July 29, 2011, after reaffirming all previous resolutions and statements on the situation in Sudan, the Council extended the mandate of the African Union – United Nations Hybrid Operation in Darfur (UNAMID) for a further 12 months until July 31, 2012.

The resolution allowed more time for the United Nations to decide how many troops were needed in the region.

== Resolution ==
=== Observations ===
The Council recalled that there would be no peace without justice and the need to end impunity. It expressed support to the African Union-United Nations peace process hosted in Qatar, though regretted that some groups had refused to participate. Furthermore, the signing of the "Doha Document for Peace in Darfur" between the Sudanese government and Liberation and Justice Movement (JLM) was welcomed, and the relevant parties were urged to agree a permanent ceasefire.

Meanwhile, the resolution expressed concern about the deteriorating situation in parts of Darfur, through ceasefire violations, attacks by rebel groups, airstrikes by the Sudanese government, intertribal fighting, attacks on humanitarian and United Nations personnel and the displacement of tens of thousands of civilians, as reported by the Secretary-General Ban Ki-moon. There was also concern about renewed hostilities between the Sudanese government and the Sudan Liberation Movement/Army's (SLM/A), Minni Minnawi and Abdul Wahid factions, and the Justice and Equality Movement.

The preamble of the resolution reaffirmed that there could be no military solution to the conflict, and all violations of human rights and international humanitarian law were condemned. It was concerned with the implications of the situation on countries in the region and therefore encouraged Sudan, Chad, and the Central African Republic to co-operate to bring about peace in Darfur.

=== Acts ===
UNAMID's Chapter VII mandate was extended until the end of July 2012. The peacekeeping operation was instructed to protect civilians and ensure the delivery of humanitarian aid, without prejudice to the primary responsibility of the Sudanese government.

The Secretary-General was asked to work closely with the African Union and other parties and to report on the progress of the peace process and the mandate of UNAMID. The Council demanded that UNAMID be given a radio license in order to communicate freely with all stakeholders in Darfur, in line with the status of forces agreement. All violations of human rights were condemned and again concern was expressed at the situation in Darfur; parties to the conflict had to take steps to protect civilians.

Meanwhile, the resolution called for co-operation between UNAMID and other peacekeeping operations in the region, including the United Nations Mission in the Republic of South Sudan and the United Nations Interim Security Force for Abyei.

== See also ==
- International response to the War in Darfur
- List of United Nations Security Council Resolutions 2001 to 2100 (2011 – present)
- Sudanese nomadic conflicts
- War in Darfur
