= The Seekers of Truth and Justice =

The Seekers of Truth and Justice (Arabic: الباحثين عن الحقيقة والعدالة) were a political-action group operating from the mid-1990s to the early 2000s in Sudan. The group was founded by Khalil Ibrahim and eventually evolved into the Justice and Equality Movement (JEM) in the early 2000s, marked by their creation and distribution of a controversial document entitled "The Black Book". Their relationship with the government in Khartoum was hostile at best and only increased in tension as the organization developed.

Flag of Sudan

== Origins ==
Khalil Ibrahim organized the Seekers of Truth and Justice that originally supported the National Islamic Front (NIF) and famous Islamist, Hassan al-Turabi. After the NIF took power and continued to marginalize the Darfur region in the same way which the previous administration had, Ibrahim distanced himself from the group and took on a new independence in his organization. The members were mostly men who began looking to Islam in their youth as an answer to their nation's political issues. The Muslim Brotherhood advocated that political Islam would bring honest and equal commitment to all Muslims. The group's core support consisted of Zaghawa tribe members, specifically of the Kobe branch to which Ibrahim belonged. It is also speculated that many Zaghawa decided to join militias after the government failed to enforce a peace agreement from years earlier, requiring Arab nomads to “pay blood money for the Zaghawa they had killed.” Possible original members of the group based on their seniority positions in JEM include Zakaria Abbas, Omar Karma, Hamid Yusef El Mahil, Salih El Tom Abbas, and Hamid Musabil.

=== The Influence of the Muslim Brothers ===
The strategy of the Muslim Brotherhood in Khartoum was to target students at Khartoum University through their created “Students Unity Front.” Hassan al Turabi was one of the primary Muslim Brotherhood leaders in Sudan, who advocated a restructuring of the group's organization as opposed to an armed struggle. Under Turabi, the Sudanese Brothers founded the NIF as an alternative to the existing regime in the 1970s. It was through this movement that Khalil Ibrahim was able to gain enough momentum to form the Seekers of Truth and Justice.

== Purpose ==
The purpose of the group of the Seekers of Truth and Justice is evident in both their name and in the legend of their most successful operation, the Black Book. “Political, economic, and social marginalization of the region” was their explicit reason for resistance. Their overarching goal had a national agenda attached to it. Not only did Ibrahim and his followers want Darfuris to have equal representation, but they wanted full-blown regime change. In order to accomplish this goal, they conducted a series of information operations that would eventually lead to the widespread distribution of their propaganda.

They attempted to gather information regarding power-holders in Khartoum, despite the government's non-transparent and censored history. Due to their leader, Khalil Ibrahim's, past involvement with both the government and Hassan al-Turabi (an Islamist leader in Sudan) the group was able to access more government documents than an average citizen. By informing the population of their underrepresentation backed by concrete evidence, the group hoped to empower the people and consequently, spark a rebellion.

== The Black Book ==
The Black Book: Imbalance of Power and Wealth in the Sudan, premiering in May 2000, compiled statistics revealing inconsistencies in Sudan's government system. For one, it explained that the vast majority of official government positions were occupied by members of three tribes that made up only 5.4% of Sudan's total population. The Seekers of Truth and Justice included this information to show that most Sudanese people were not being properly represented in the government apparatus due to this disparity. Secondly, it criticized the National Islamic Front (NIF) who had overthrown the government over a decade earlier. The Black Book accused NIF of committing the same injustices of the preceding regime, despite promises to end them. The overarching message of the book was that the government in Khartoum was dominated by an Arab minority, resulting in the disadvantage and marginalization of non-Arab Sudanese elsewhere throughout the country.

=== Role in the Darfuri Rebellion ===
The group made and disseminated over 1,600 copies of the Black Book. The majority of the copies were circulated outside Mosques after Friday's evening prayer to local people. A few hundred were spread abroad, and the rest were left on the desks of Khartoum government officials for them to see upon returning from their prayers as well. Their choice of distribution was strategic: (1) dispersing the document abroad alerted the rest of the world the situation Sudan was in, (2) spreading the greatest amount to locals informed them all at once that they were the majority and therefore a formidable force against a minority government, and (3) providing a copy for government officials alerted Khartoum that there was a new level of transparency into their inner-workings that just went public. Rebellion finally broke out in Darfur less than two years from when the Black Book was released.

== The Justice and Equality Movement (JEM) ==
After mounting their massive and successful “Black Book” operation, the Seekers of Truth and Justice evolved into the Justice and Equality Movement (JEM): a larger and more militant Darfuri rebel group. In conjunction with the Sudanese Liberation Army (SLA), JEM would go on to launch several violent attacks against the government in Khartoum in an attempt to further their national agenda of seeing regime change. Despite their formidable force, they have been unsuccessful in ousting President al-Bashir from his position as the head of Sudan's government.

== Current State ==
The Seekers of Truth and Justice no longer exist as they originally did; employing tools of soft power and psychological warfare to mobilize the masses. The Justice and Equality Movement – the more violent and militant evolvement of the Seekers - however, is still existent and active in Sudan today as a Darfuri rebel group.

One of the largest alternative rebel assemblies in Darfur is the Sudanese Liberation Army (SLA), which has split into two factions according to their leaders: Abdul Wahid and Minni Minawi. Both groups employ tools of hard power in their offensives. The Sudanese Bloc to Liberate the Republic (SBLR) as well as the Liberation and Justice Movement (LJM) used to be independent organizations but have recently joined forces with JEM. As the Northern counter to the already existing SPLA, the Sudan People's Liberation Movement-North (SPLM-N) was created. In 2011, all of these have combined to form the Sudan Revolutionary Front (DRF).
