= 2025 Tarasin landslide =

Landslide in Central Darfur, Sudan

- Date: 31 August 2025
- Location: Marrah Mountains in Central Darfur, western Sudan; 13°2′25″N 24°23′11″E
- Type: Landslide
- Cause: Days of heavy rainfall
- Outcome: Village destroyed
- Deaths: 375–1,573
- Injuries: 1

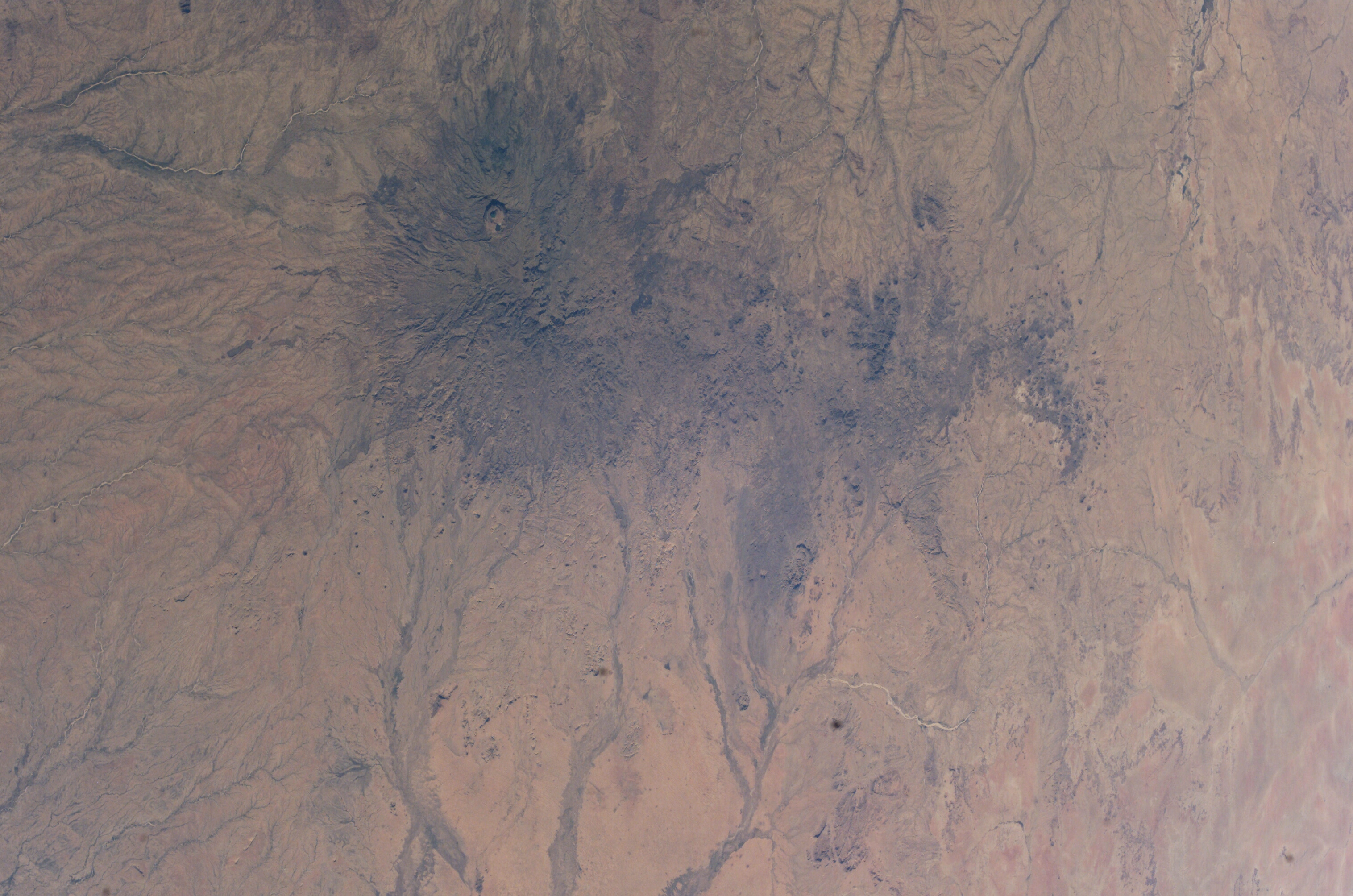

On 31 August 2025, a landslide destroyed the village of Tarasin (also rendered Tarseen and Tarsin) in the Marrah Mountains in Central Darfur, western Sudan, killing between 375 and 1,500 people.

== Impact ==
The landslide occurred at 17:00 CAT in Tarasin (Turrah, Turra), a village in the Marrah Mountains in Central Darfur, according to the Sudan Liberation Movement/Army (SLM), which controls much of the area. According to witnesses, the landslides came in two waves within a few hours, with the second burying villagers who were trying to help victims of the first landslide. Additional landslides occurred on 1 and 2 September.

Conflicting accounts emerged as to the number of casualties, with the Federal Ministry of Health saying that only two people died, while civil authorities linked to the SLM estimated that there were at least 1,573 fatalities. The SLM said that around 1,000 people died, adding that the death toll was a preliminary estimate and that their early assessment suggests "the death of all village residents". One survivor was later found, described by a relative as being in a coma after sustaining multiple fractures to both legs and a serious head injury. By September 5, 375 bodies had been recovered from the site. Save the Children said as many as 200 children were among the dead. The International Organization for Migration said that 150 people were displaced from the area.

The landslide was attributed by the Sudanese Ministry of Minerals to heavy rain during the last week of August that destabilised the mountain slopes. The affected village was situated in an area known for growing citruses. The SLM added that 1,500 homes were destroyed while over 5,000 head of livestock were lost.

Images from the site showed two gullies on a mountainside converging at a lower level where the village was located. The United Nations initially said that it had confirmed at least 370 deaths, adding that it was hard to assess the scale of the incident or the exact death toll due to the area's remote location. It later revised the potential death toll down to "scores" for undisclosed reasons. Doctors Without Borders noted the ongoing Sudanese civil war as a complicating factor. The SLM said the area was accessible only by foot or donkeys.

== Aftermath ==
The SLM made appeals to the United Nations and international humanitarian organisations for assistance in retrieving the dead. The SLM's leader, Abdul Wahid al-Nur, said residents of other villages were fearful of a similar disaster impacting them. The SLM also accused elements from the former regime of Omar al-Bashir embedded in the SAF-aligned government based in Port Sudan of spreading disinformation to downplay the scale of the disaster. Save the Children sent an 11-person team carrying humanitarian aid to Tarasin on 4 September using donkeys following a six-hour trek from Golo. An inter-agency assessment team that included personnel from the United Nations reached the area on 8 September.

Both of the competing governments headed by the main factions in the civil war, namely the Sudanese Armed Forces and the Rapid Support Forces, pledged to provide assistance to the victims. The African Union called for a ceasefire to facilitate the delivery of aid. On 2 September, the SAF-aligned government announced that it would continue to open the Adre border crossing with Chad until the end of the year in consideration over the landslide.
