= Shartai Jaafar Abdel Hakam =

Sudanese politician

- شرتاي جعفر عبد الحكم

Chairperson of the Transitional Darfur Regional Authority
- In office 6 December 2010 – 20 September 2011
- Preceded by: Minni Minnawi
- Succeeded by: Tijini Sese

Personal details
- Died: 11 February 2024 Port Sudan, Sudan
- Party: National Congress Party

Shartai Jaafar Abdel Hakam (Arabic: شرتاي جعفر عبد الحكم) (died 11 February 2024) was a Sudanese politician who served as governor of West Darfur and Chairperson of the Transitional Darfur Regional Authority (TDRA). He was commissioner of Garsila from 2003 to 2004, had as the highest-ranking official responsibility for the mass executions in Deleig and Garsila in March 2004. He became minister for health for West Darfur in 2004, which he stayed until October 2005. He has been accused of arming the militias fighting the black African Fur. He became Chairperson of the authority in December 2010 following the withdrawal of the Sudan Liberation Movement from the Darfur Peace Agreement and the dismissal of its leader Minni Minnawi from that post. Abdel-Hakam was able to assume the office of Chairman as the Darfur Peace Agreement states that should the position become vacant, one of the Darfur state governors may chair its proceedings. Abdel-Hakam served as chair of the TDRA until the body was reconstituted as the Darfur Regional Authority with Tijani Sese as chair on 20 September 2011. On 11 February 2024, he died in Port Sudan.

Political offices
| Preceded by Minni Minnawi | Chairperson of the Transitional Darfur Regional Authority; 2010-2011 | Succeeded by Tijani Sese |
