= Darfur Regional Government =

Regional governing body in Sudan

Darfur Regional Government حكومة إقليم دارفور Hukumat Aqalim Darfur
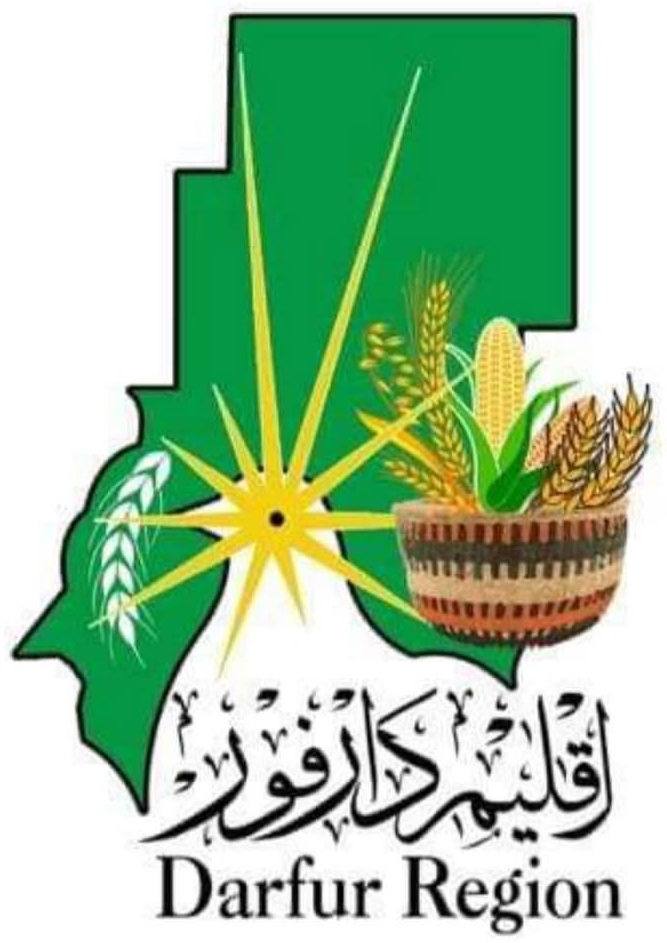
- Flag Coat of arms

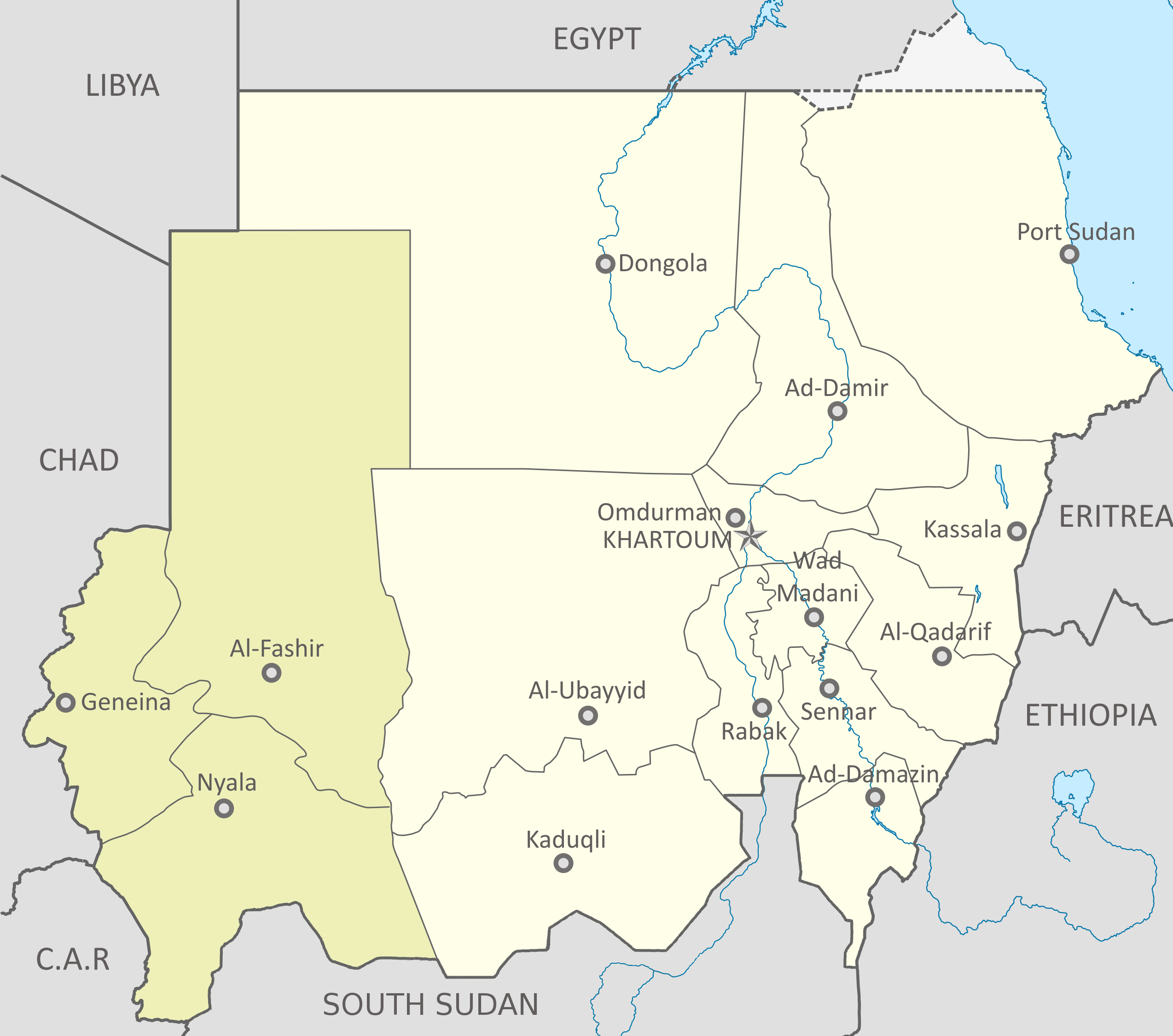
- Headquarters: Al-Fashir (GPU); Port Sudan (GoS)
- Official languages: Arabic, Fur

Government
  - Regional Governor: Minni Minawi
  - GPU rival Governor: El Hadi Idris Yahya

Establishment
  - Abuja Agreement: 5 May 2006
  - Doha Agreement: 14 July 2011
  - Darfur Regional Government: 10 August 2021
  - GPU rival administration: 26 July 2025

The Darfur Regional Government is an administrative body for the Darfur region of the Republic of Sudan.

A Transitional Darfur Regional Authority was established in April 2007 under the terms of the 2006 Darfur Peace Agreement signed in May 2006. The transitional authority was reconstituted as the Darfur Regional Authority on 14 July 2011, following the signing of a new Darfur Peace Agreement, which included provisions for a regional authority with both executive and legislative functions. The current de jure regional government was formed in August 2021. The rival Government of Peace and Unity established an alternative regional administration in 2025 following their takeover of the Darfur region.

== History ==
=== Transitional Darfur Regional Authority (2007-2011) ===
A Transitional Darfur Regional Authority was established in April 2007 as part of the Darfur Peace Agreement between the Government of Sudan and the Sudan Liberation Movement of Minni Minnawi. The agreement was an attempt to resolve the Darfur conflict that had been ongoing from February 2003. The agreement was only signed by one rebel group, the Sudan Liberation Movement, and rejected by the Justice and Equality Movement, resulting in continuation of the conflict.

TDRA was composed of six commissions amongst which Darfur Reconstruction and Development Fund (DRDF) represented the backbone of the Authority. Abdelgabar Dosa was the founding President of the DRDF. The Commission had prepared a comprehensive and significant reconstruction and development plan of seven years 2008–2015 to be implemented in the region with all projects prepared meeting the international standards. In 2008 as the government failed to fulfil its obligations to allocate the seed money ($700 million) agreed upon in the agreement Abdelgabar Dosa resigned and is living as a refugee in the UK.

In December 2010, the Sudan Liberation Movement withdrew from the peace agreement and the regional authority. Its leader Minni Minnawi fled to Southern Sudan and has since been dismissed as Senior Assistant to the President of Sudan and as Chairman of the Transitional Darfur Regional Authority. The new Chairman Shartai Jaafar Abdel Hakam subsequently dismissed 10 other members of the Sudan Liberation Movement from the authority.

=== Darfur Regional Authority (2011-2016) ===
In June 2011, a new Darfur Peace Agreement was proposed by the Joint Mediators at the Doha Peace Forum. This new agreement was intended to supersede the 2006 Abuja Agreement and included provisions for a Darfuri Vice-President and an administrative structure that includes both the states (as part of the process, two additional states were to be created in January 2012 within Darfur) and a strategic regional authority to oversee Darfur as a whole. The new agreement was signed by the Government of Sudan and the Liberation and Justice Movement on 14 July 2011. The Sudan Liberation Movement and the Justice and Equality Movement did not sign the new document but have three months in which to do so if they wish. The transition process towards a new authority began on 20 September 2011 when Tijani Sese was named as its chairman by the President of Sudan. He was formally sworn in as chairman in October 2011 which was followed by the other executive members being appointed in January 2012. The two new states (East Darfur and Central Darfur) were also created in the Darfur region at the same time, bringing the total to five. The new authority assumed its full functions on 8 February 2012.

Following the Darfur status referendum held in April 2016, the DRA was dissolved in July 2016. Its assets were handed over to the Office of the President of Sudan and the commissions established as part of the Darfur peace Agreement now report directly to the president.

The 2011 Darfur Peace Agreement contained provisions for an administrative structure for Darfur that includes the three states (raised to five states from January 2012) and a strategic authority to oversee the region as a whole. The regional authority it proposed consists of both executive and legislative organs which are known as the Darfur Executive and the Darfur Council.

The Darfur Executive was led by an Executive Chairperson and also included an Executive Deputy-Chairperson, Darfur state governors, ministers and heads of ad hoc Darfur commissions.

The Darfur Council was made up of 66 Council Members drawn from the armed movements and the Darfur state legislatures. The Council met for the first time in January 2013 in Nyala, South Darfur.

==== Status referendum ====
The permanent status of the Darfur region was determined by a referendum held in April 2016 in which the people of Darfur had the choice between "the creation of a Darfur Region composed of the three states" (there are now five states), with a constitution and regional government, or the retention of the status quo, with the Darfur region divided between several states. The referendum result supported the retention of the status quo and the regional authority was dissolved on 14 June 2016.

=== Darfur Regional Government (2021-present) ===
On 31 August 2020, the Juba Agreement was signed between the Transitional Government of Sudan and two Darfur based opposition groups, the Sudan Liberation Movement/Army and the Justice and Equality Movement on the other. The agreement stated that the two former rebel groups would join the transition to democracy in Sudan through peaceful means. As part of this agreement, the Darfur Regional Government was formed in August 2021 when Minni Minnawi was appointed as Regional Governor.

=== Government of Peace and Unity administration (2025-present) ===
In July 2025, during the Sudanese Civil War, the rival Government of Peace and Unity appointed El Hadi Idris Yahya as governor of their alternative Darfur regional administration. The GPU-affiliated Rapid Support Forces militia took control of El-Fashir, the capital of the Darfur region in October 2025. Shortly after the city's capture, an estimated 60,000–68,000 civilians were killed by the RSF in the El Fasher massacre.

== Leadership ==
The leaders of the Darfur Regional Government and its predecessor bodies are as follows:

No.	Portrait	Name	Term of office			Political affiliation
No.	Portrait	Name	Took office	Left office	Time in office	Political affiliation
1		Minni Minnawi	23 April 2007	5 December 2010	3 years, 226 days	Sudan Liberation Movement/Army
2		Shartai Jaafar Abdel Hakam	5 December 2010	20 September 2011	289 days	National Congress Party
3		Tijani Sese	20 September 2011	14 July 2016	4 years, 298 days	Liberation and Justice Movement
Post abolished (14 July 2016 – 10 August 2021)
(1)		Minni Minnawi	10 August 2021	Incumbent	5 years, 54 days	Sudan Liberation Movement/Army

== See also ==
- Darfur conflict
- Darfur Peace Agreement
- United Nations Security Council Resolution 1706
- United Nations Mission in Sudan
- African Union – United Nations Hybrid Operation in Darfur
