= Deribat =

Town in Sudan

Deribat دريبات
- Town
- Location in Sudan
- Coordinates: 13°4′51″N 24°31′10″E
- Country: (Sudan) Sudan; De facto: Liberated Areas
- State: South Darfur
- Control: Sudan Liberation Movement (al-Nur)
- Elevation: 1,456 m (4,777 ft)

Population
  - Estimate (2007): 80,000
- Time zone: Central Africa Time, GMT + 3

Deribat (Arabic: دريبات) is a town located in South Darfur, Sudan, east of Jebel Marra.

== History ==
During the War in Darfur, in December 2006, Sudanese Armed Forces (SAF) and allied Janjaweed militia reportedly attacked villages in and around Deribat. The attacks resulted in civilian deaths, displacement, and widespread rape of women and girls, some of whom were pregnant. Many victims were reportedly asked about their connections to rebels before being assaulted. The attackers, described as soldiers, often wore uniforms and travelled in vehicles. Some victims were held captive and repeatedly assaulted. The systematic use of rape as a weapon of war is a violation of the Geneva Conventions and is punishable by the International Criminal Court.

Since then the area is caught between government bombings and the rare arrival of humanitarian aid. The main supply route to Deribat was closed by government forces, isolating the area and driving away aid organisations. The UN's humanitarian chief, John Holmes, visited the area, witnessing the dire need for medicine and education. However, aid groups find it too dangerous to operate due to militia attacks on workers. The last two aid groups left in August 2007, but aid returned to the area in 2017.

The town was under the control of the Sudan Liberation Movement (SLM-AW) led by Abdul Wahid al-Nur until 2010, when government forces took control. Since then, the population of Deribat has reportedly fled, and the area is said to be largely inhabited by soldiers and militiamen at the Deribat military base. However, fighting between SAF and SLM-AW continued with government delegations being ambushed by paramilitary groups in March 2010. Also, in October, the SAF attacked Deribat killing three women and injuring two infants. The attack also resulted in the burning of large areas of farmland. A Darfur rebel group retaliated, reportedly killing 37 government forces and seizing a military base.

During 2023 Sudan war between the SAF and the Rapid Support Forces (RSF), the town was initially captured by the RSF, but was later taken by the Sudan Liberation Movement (Al Nur) in December 2023 after RSF retreated to Nyala, the capital of the state.
