= The Black Book: Imbalance of Power and Wealth in the Sudan =

Sudanese political manuscript

The Black Book: Imbalance of Power and Wealth in the Sudan, known commonly as the Black Book (Arabic: الكتاب الأسود al-kitab al-aswad), is a manuscript detailing a pattern of disproportionate political control by the people of northern Sudan and marginalization of the rest of the country. It was published in two parts, the first in May 2000 and the second in August 2002. While published anonymously, it was later revealed that the writers had strong ties to the Justice and Equality Movement, a rebel group active in the conflict that later erupted in Darfur to the west.

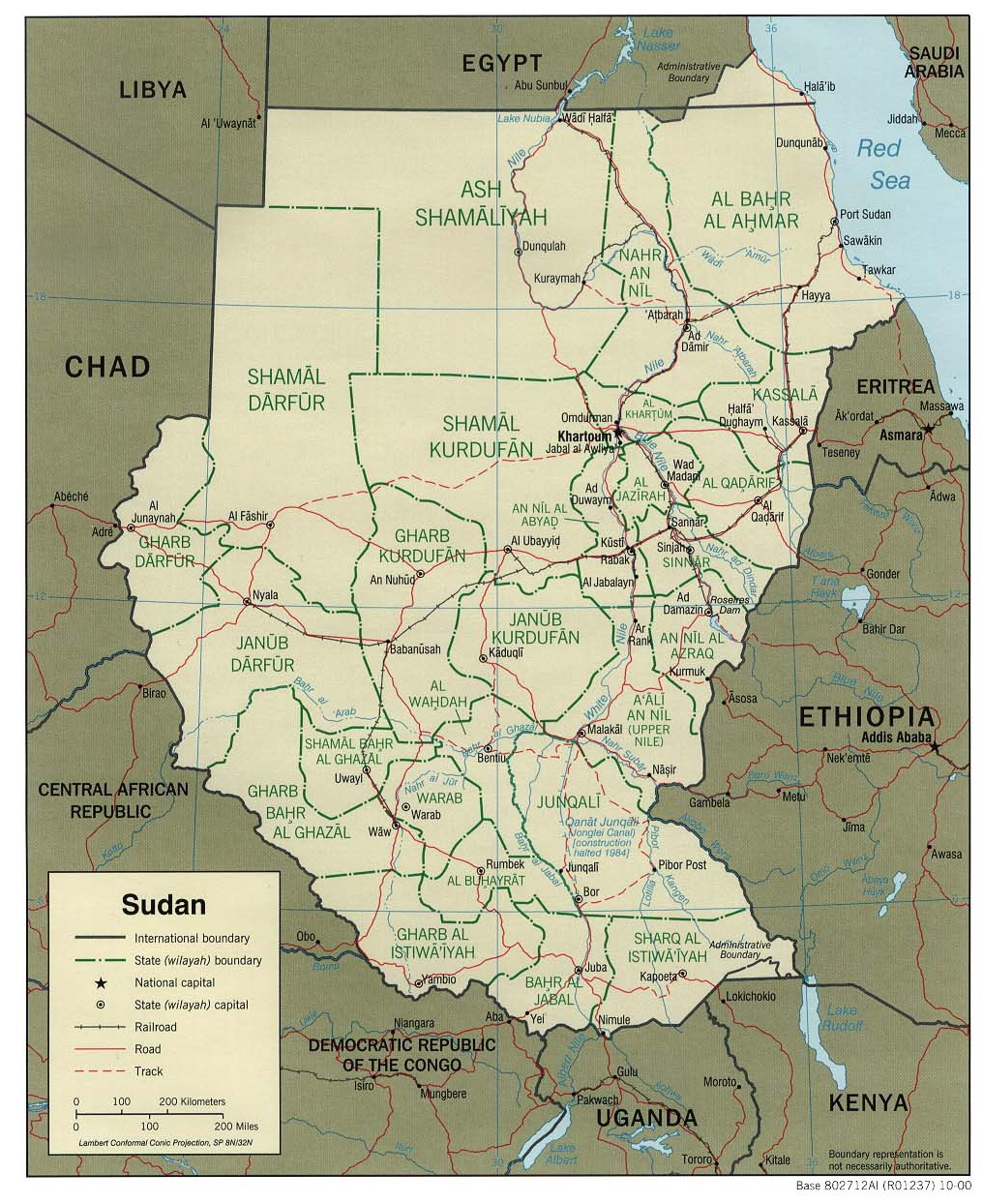
Map of Sudan in 2000

== Contents ==
Population (1986 census) and representation
Region	Population	%	Repre- sentation	%
Northern	1,026,406	5.4	58	79.5
Eastern	2,222,779	11.8	1	1.4
Central	4,908,038	26.5	2	2.8
Southern	4,407,450	23.7	12	16.4
Western	6,072,872	32.6	0	0

The first page of the Black Book, Part I, states its thesis: "This publication unveils the level of injustice practised by successive governments, secular and theocratic, democratic or autocratic, since the independence of the country in 1956 to this date." The main argument of the book, which is demonstrated using a simple statistical analysis of Sudan's population by ethnicity, is that the riverine Arabs near Khartoum have a disproportionate amount of political power compared to other ethnic groups.

The first of the many charts details the populations of the various regions and number of Federal/National-level representatives, as a percentage of the total, since independence. It pointed out that every single president had come from the North. The book goes on to break down these numbers of representation by regime since independence, constitutionally mandated posts, and state governorships, all illustrated through charts. After dealing with the central point about inequality in positions of high office, the Black Book goes on to detail similarly disproportionate results in the number of Attorneys General, executive staff in the Ministry of Finance and the National Council for Distribution of Resources, which allocates oil wealth, as well to note the cultural domination of the national media by northerners. Practically every major sector of society is analyzed to show a pattern of northern control.

Academic Abdullahi El-Tom, in his critique of the book, states that the latter half is not nearly as well-argued as the heavily statistical beginning, making points that are then not substantiated and sometimes falling into polemical statements. For example, the Black Book states that the equipment that was to be used for the Western Highway Project was diverted to the Northern Highway Project, which is both widely rumored and believed, but no evidence is provided to back it up. El-Tom further makes the following observations: it has an implicit view of Sudan as Islamic; it emphasizes the grievances of Western Sudan (i.e. Darfur and Kordofan) over the other marginalized regions; and it has an unforgiving stance towards all the north, rather than just the three clans identified as controlling the government (i.e. the Shaigiya, the Jaaliyeen and the Danagla).

Part II was originally supposed to concentrate on policy recommendations stemming from the analysis in Part I. However, the Sudanese government so strongly attacked the findings of the first part that the writers instead took the opportunity to back up the original publication. Part II thus consists of the listing of every single government official counted in the first part, with their regional and clan affiliation.

== Distribution and reaction ==
The Black Book had a dramatic introduction. People leaving mosques in Khartoum after Friday evening prayers were greeted by polite young men passing out thick photocopied stapled versions on A4 paper. Such an activity in censored Sudan was unusual; the fact that the document being passed out was an indictment of the national power structure has been termed "revolutionary". Scholar Gérard Prunier notes that

it said nothing to the average Northern Sudanese that they did not know already. What created a shock were not the contents of the book but simply the fact that an unspoken taboo had been broken and that somebody […] had dared to put into print what everybody knew but did not want to talk about.

The fact that the writers identified themselves only as "The Seekers of Truth and Justice", without a place of publication or copyright notice, only added to the mystery. Over three days, 1600 copies were handed out—800 in Khartoum, 500 in other parts of Sudan (except the South) and 300 abroad. Copies were reportedly left on the desks on President Omar al-Bashir and other senior government officials while they were out for prayers.

Government newspapers launched attacks on the publication in front page articles, denouncing the authors as "tribalists". Security forces attempted to discover the authors, while it was rumored that several junior government staffers had been fired after copies were found on ministers' desks. Publishing houses were checked and journalists, academics and other known writers were questioned to determine the book's origin. However, the book was already out and being photocopied and spread. One estimate put the total number of photocopies secretly made by individuals at 50,000. An owner of a photocopying shop in Khartoum was quoted as saying, "I made no less that [sic] 100 copies for our customers. We sometimes charged them more due to the risk involved in duplicating illegal documents." Given the high levels of illiteracy in Sudan, most people heard of the Black Book by word of mouth. The document, as controversial as it was, quickly became central to Sudanese political discourse. Political factions campaigning for support in the West found that political discussion revolved around the western highway project, salaries for civil servants, especially teachers, and the Black Book.

Regional revenue and expenditure, 1996–2000 averages (% of value for North)
Region	Total expenditure per capita	Total revenue per capita	Effective subsidy per capita	Development expenditure per capita
North	100.0	100.0	100.0	100.0
Central	104.0	134.1	16.8	245.5
Khartoum	161.5	213.7	13.3	532.9
Central ex. Khartoum	60.6	70.9	23.8	35.5
East	73.7	98.4	1.6	79.5
West	44.1	43.9	43.3	17.0
Darfur	40.6	41.5	35.1	17.2
Kordofan	49.9	47.6	57.5	15.5

In an attempt to double-check the book's central conclusion of national inequity, Alex Cobham of the University of Oxford did a parallel study in 2005, including an analysis of income generation and expenditure by region to determine if there was a pattern of subsidies between regions. He concluded,

There can be no doubt that the current dictatorship has been pernicious for the human development of the regions outside of the North and Khartoum. There can be no question that the data support the claims made in the Black Book that the Sudan has been governed to benefit those regions disproportionately at the expense of all others.

== Authorship and context ==
In the early 1980s Islamist Hassan al-Turabi had returned from exile, and in 1989 took power in a military coup. Al-Turabi appeared to promise political Islam as a solution; that with hard work and honesty as part of the Ummah, people could solve the political and social problems afflicting the country. Many Muslims from the disadvantaged regions of West, East and Central Sudan flocked to al-Turabi and his message. However, by the mid-1990s, the Islamist project was collapsing due to entrenched corruption and widespread anger at the waste of lives in the Second Sudanese Civil War with the south. In 1998, al-Turabi managed to position himself as Speaker of the House under the new National Congress. However, Ali Osman Mohamed Taha, al-Turabi's former follower, defected to the side of al-Bashir and, in December 1999, al-Bashir declared a state of emergency, stripping al-Turabi of his position and power.

The book's critics, mainly government officials connected to al-Bashir, have consistently claimed that it was made at the direction of al-Turabi. Al-Turabi has denied any connection with either the book or with the JEM. In interviews, writers have stated that they, al-Turabi and the ruling government were all connected through the National Islamic Front, but that al-Turabi had nothing to do with the writing of the Black Book.

The writers trace their roots to 1993, when a cell of NIF members, including Khalil Ibrahim, the former Darfur Minister of Education, began meeting in secret in al-Fashir to discuss the possibility of reforming the NIF from within. A second clandestine cell formed in 1994 in Kurdufan, and third in Khartoum in 1997. Most of the Khartoum cell were university graduates and most were Islamists. The year that the Khartoum cell was formed, the dissidents decided that their first step should be to inform the populace of the structural problems; a 25-man committee was set up to gather information and begin writing. Julie Flint and Alex de Waal call the Black Book "the obituary of the Islamic revolution". However, by the time of its publication, the cell members had already decided that internal reform was impossible and that armed resistance was the only course of action. In 2001, they sent twenty of their leaders to begin openly organizing and, in August 2001, Khalil Ibrahim announced the existence of the Justice and Equality Movement, a group that would form a minority partner with the secular rebel Sudan Liberation Movement (SLM) already active in Darfur. Exactly a year after the announcement, Part II of the Black Book was put up on the JEM website. Almost all of the authors joined the JEM or secular resistance movements. As of October 2006, the JEM continued its armed rebellion in Darfur in a conflict that had displaced hundreds of thousands.
