= Tijani Sese =

Tijani Sese is a Sudanese Darfuri politician. He was the leader Darfur Regional Government from 2011 to 2016 and a state minister of finance and the governor of Darfur in the government of Sadiq Al-Mahdi from 1986 to 1989. Sese was also the leader of Liberation and Justice Movement (LJM) a rebel group in Darfur.

== Biography ==
Tijani Sese, a member of the Fur Tribe and a former economics professor of Khartoum University, was named the Darfur governor and a state minister of finance by Sadiq al-Mahdi in 1986. He also was a member of the National Umma Party headed by al-Mahdi. In 2010, Sese created the rebel group LJM. LJM participated in the Doha Peace Process and after signing a ceasefire with the government, Sese was declared the leader of Darfur Regional Government on 27 December 2011 in El Fasher. This appointment was initially contested by other rebel groups as Sese hadn't lived in Darfur for 20 years. On 16 March 2011 Sese called for UNAMID forces to be replaced by joint Chadian Sudanese forces. In 2014, An elder brother of Sese was killed in Darfur. In 2018, Sese was ousted as the leader of the LJM after being accused of entering his own personal militiamen in to a disarmament process instead of LJM ex-combatants. In 2021, Sese launched a new political coalition called National Movement Forces alliance (NMF).
