= Minni Minnawi =

Sudanese politician (born 1968)

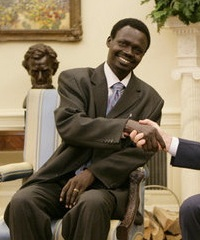
- Minnawi in July 2006 meeting with George W. Bush at the White House.

Regional Governor of Darfur
- Incumbent
- Assumed office 10 August 2021
- President: Abdel Fattah al-Burhan
- Prime Minister: Abdalla Hamdok
- Preceded by: office created

Chairperson of the Transitional Darfur Regional Authority
- In office 23 April 2007 – 6 December 2010
- Preceded by: office created
- Succeeded by: Shartai Jaafar Abdel Hakam

Personal details
- Born: 12 December 1968 (age 57) Furawiyya, North Darfur, Sudan
- Party: Sudan Liberation Movement
- Relatives: Abbas (brother); Yusef (brother)

Suliman Arcua Minnawi (Arabic: سليمان أركو مناوي; born 12 December 1968), also known as "Minni Minnawi" (مني مناوي), is a Sudanese politician and the leader of a faction of the Sudanese Liberation Army. A former educator, Minnawi served as secretary to Sudan Liberation Army leader Abdul Wahid al-Nur before the organization split in 2004. He was a prominent rebel commander of the Darfuri rebel group Sudan Liberation Movement (SLM) during the 2000s conflict, and later signed a peace agreement to join the government. He later went back into opposition, and was finally appointed Governor of Darfur under a transitional framework after the signing of the Juba peace accord.

Minnawi signed a treaty, known as the Darfur Peace Agreement, with the Khartoum government in May 2006. Nevertheless, in July 2006, fighting broke out around the North Darfur town of Korma, resulting in the deaths of at least 80 people. In the same year, Minnawi was appointed the top Sudanese official in the Darfur region, as chairman of the Transitional Darfur Regional Authority, and was technically the fourth ranking member of the Presidency, as Senior Assistant to the President of the Republic.

On 14 September 2006, in defiance of the central government's opposition, Minnawi supported the new UN peacekeeping force detailed in UNSC Resolution 1706, which was designed to protect the Sudanese people. Minnawi opposed the Darfur genocide (2003–2005), which took place under Omar al-Bashir and was directed against the Zaghawa people and other civilians. For his alleged actions, Bashir was later indicted by the International Criminal Court (ICC).

In December 2010, after repeated complaints of non-compliance by the National Congress Party with the peace accords, the Sudan Liberation Movement under Minnawi withdrew from the Darfur Peace Agreement. Minnawi resigned as Senior Assistant to the President of Sudan and as Chairperson of the Transitional Darfur Regional Authority, to ally his faction, SLM/MM, with the other resistance defense forces in Darfur, including Abdul Wahid's faction, the SLM/AW, in resisting attacks by the Sudanese Armed Forces and its militias on citizens in rebel-held areas. In 2011, SLM/MM joined the Sudan Revolutionary Front (SRF) opposing the Khartoum Government.

In May 2021, Minni Minnawi was appointed governor of the Darfur Regional Government after signing the Juba Peace Agreement the previous year. He was inaugurated on 10 August.

During the Sudanese Civil War, the rival Government of Peace and Unity (GPU) appointed El Hadi Idris Yahya as governor of their alternative Darfur regional administration in June 2024 during. The GPU-affiliated Rapid Support Forces militia took control of El-Fashir, the capital of Darfur, in October 2025. Minni Minnawi continues to lead the de jure Darfur Regional Government from Port Sudan.

Political offices
Preceded by Office created	Chairperson of the Transitional Darfur Regional Authority; 2007–2010	Succeeded by Shartai Jaafar Abdel Hakam
