= Liberated Areas (Sudan) =

Area of Sudan under the effective control of SLA al-Nur

Liberated Areas المناطق المحررة
- 2021–present
- Flag
- Anthem: Anthem of the Liberated Areas
- Liberated Areas
- Status: De facto government
- Capital: Torung Tonga; 12°55′37″N 24°20′13″E
- Largest city: Various (changed over time); Deribat (current)
- Official languages: Arabic
- Religion: Secularism
- Government: Civil administration
- Chairman
  - Since 2021: Abdul Wahid al-Nur (Note: Also Leader of the Sudan Liberation Movement (al-Nur).)
- Force commander of the Sudan Liberation Movement (al-Nur) (Note: Also called Rebel commander in Torontonga or Military commander.)
  - Since 2021: Abdelgadir Abdelrahman Ibrahim
- Spokesperson
  - Unknown: Mohamed Abdel Rahman al-Nayer
- Establishment: Pre-Sudanese civil war (2023-present)
- History
  - First reports of the existence of the Liberated areas: March 2021

Population
  - Estimate: 3,279,000
- Currency: Sudanese pound
- Time zone: UTC+3 (CAT); UTC+02:00 (CAT)
- Website https://slma.net/en/report-from-civil-authority-of-the-sudan-liberation-movement-liberated-territories-tawila/

The Liberated Areas, (Arabic: المناطق المحررة, romanized: al-Manāṭiq al-Muḥarrira) also known as the Liberated Territories refers to the territory under the de facto control of the Sudanese rebel group SLA (al-Nur), also known as SLA-AW. The civil administration that governs the Liberated Areas is called the Civil Authority of the Sudan Liberation Movement. The Liberated Areas have remained neutral throughout the Sudanese civil war.

== History ==
The SLM (al-Nur) was founded in 2006 and is led by Abdul Wahid al Nur. Since its founding, the group has fought in many Sudanese conflicts such as the War in Darfur, the Heglig Crisis, and the South Sudanese Civil War.

In August 2025, the Tarasin landslide affected areas under the control of the SLM (al-Nur).

In October, the Sudan Liberation Army Movement (al-Nur) claimed that they had received a number of displaced people in areas under their control.

== Territorial control and government ==
=== Territory ===
Since 2021, the SLM/A (al-Nur) maintains a stronghold in the Marrah Mountains (including Torontonga), Nertiti, Deribat, Tawila, Kin Taura, Golo, Guldo and Rokero. The territory is inhabited by about 3,279,000 people. The area is effectively self-sufficient and mostly isolated from the rest of Sudan.

=== Civil Authority of the Sudan Liberation Movement ===
It runs a de facto government there, which is called Civil Authority of the Sudan Liberation Movement, trains new troops, and has also built several schools, where hundreds of children receive daily education.

=== Symbolism ===
In January 2026, the Liberated Areas officially adopted a flag and an anthem, replacing Sudanese symbolism with their own ideological symbols. The flag consists of four horizontal stripes of black, red, blue, and green, with a large white five-pointed star in the center.

== See also ==
- New Sudan
- Government of Peace and Unity
- Territory of the Rapid Support Forces
