= Golo, Sudan =

Golo قولو
- Location of Golo in Sudan
- Coordinates: 13.12847°N 24.28137°E
- Country: Sudan; De facto: Liberated Areas
- State: Central Darfur
- Time zone: UTC+2 (CAT)

Golo (Arabic: قولو) is a settlement and rural district located in Central Darfur, Sudan. The start of the Darfur conflict is conventionally dated to an attack claimed by the Darfur Liberation Front upon Golo on 26 February 2003. Over the course of the conflict, the hands of the government and rebel forces changed several times.
