= Abdul Wahid al-Nur =

Sudanese rebel and politician (born 1968)

Abdul Wahid Mohammed al-Nur

Chairman of the Liberated Areas
- Incumbent
- Assumed office c. March 2021
- Preceded by: Office established

Leader of the Sudan Liberation Movement (al-Nur)
- Incumbent
- Assumed office 2006
- Preceded by: Office established

Personal details
- Born: 1 January 1968 (age 58) Zalingei, Central Darfur, Sudan
- Occupation: Lawyer

Military service
- Allegiance: SLM (al-Nur) (2006–present)
- Years of service: 2006–present
- Commands: Head of the SLM al-Nur
- Battles/wars: War in Darfur; South Sudanese civil war Sudanese civil war (2023–present): Darfur campaign

Abdul Wahid Mohamed al-Nur (also Abdel Wahid el-Nur or Abdulwahid Mohammed Nour; Arabic: عبد الواحد محمد نور, ʿAbd al-Wāḥid Muḥammad Nūr; born in 1968) is the leader of the rebel Sudan Liberation Movement (al Nur) faction.

A Zaghawa born in Zalingei, West Darfur, he was educated at the University of Khartoum, where he graduated in 1995 with a law degree before working as a lawyer. The SLM was founded around 2001 with a decisive split in 2006 following the Darfur Peace Agreement when al-Nur refused to sign while Minni Minawi agreed to.

== Life ==
Abdul Wahid Mohamed al-Nur is a lawyer, born in 1968 in Zalingei, Darfur, Sudan.

He was a supporter of the Communist Party in his youth. And following the start of the current Sudanese civil war, allied again with the Communist Party by having SLM-al Nur signing a revolutionary charter with the Party.

He expressed officially, and widely, both in the Arab and Western media, his vision which is to establish a secular, liberal, democratic, and federal Sudan, where religion will be separated from the state.

Al-Nur cooperated with the International Criminal Court and provided elements that led to the indictment of Omar al-Bashir and several of his officers. He has been in contact with Fatou Bensouda, the ICC's chief prosecutor from 2012 to 2021. Al-Nur is in favour of empowering the ICC.
