= 2016 Darfurian status referendum =

A referendum on the autonomy for the Darfur within Sudan was held on 11–13 April 2016. It was originally scheduled for 1 and 2 July 2011, but was delayed. The Darfur Peace Agreement signed in May 2006 included the provision for such a referendum to be held throughout the Darfur region to determine the permanent status of that region within the Republic of the Sudan. The agreement also established a Darfur Regional Authority to help administer the region in the lead-up to the referendum. The referendum was subject to a boycott, led to student protests and accusations of vote-rigging. The results were announced on 23 April 2016 and were in favour of the retention of the status quo.

== Background ==
The Darfur Peace Agreement stated that the referendum should be held twelve months after the national elections had taken place in Darfur, and no later than July 2010. The referendum did not take place at that time. In December 2010, the secretary general of the Transitional Darfur Regional Authority, Khalid Billal Ahmad, stated that the people of Darfur will "make their final decision" in 2011 implying that the referendum will be held in that year. The chairperson of the authority also stated his commitment to the referendum in February 2011.

On 3 March 2011, it was stated that the referendum would be held within three months.

On 9 March 2011, it was announced that two more states would be established in Darfur: Central Darfur around Zalingei and East Darfur around Ed Daein. The presidential decree making this official has not yet been released; the rebel groups protested and stated that this was a bid to further divide Darfur's influence. It was also announced that this change would not affect the planned referendum. The cabinet of Sudan endorsed the plan for additional states in Darfur on 5 May 2011.

A presidential decree was released authorizing the preparations for the referendum; the decree mentioned only three states in Darfur, indicating that the creation of Central and Eastern Darfur had been rescinded. A date was not mentioned in the decree. In January 2012 two additional states, Central Darfur and Eastern Darfur states were established and governorships reshuffled.

In June 2011, the Government of Sudan stated that if a new Darfur Peace Agreement was adopted prior to July 2011, then preparations for the referendum would be stopped as the new agreement would supersede the previous Abuja Agreement of 2005. The new agreement includes provisions for a compromise between three states and one greater Darfur region by proposing a three states and supervising regional authority structure.

Just days before the referendum would have been held – with very few preparations having taken place — it was agreed that the referendum would be delayed and that it would be held a year after the signing of a further peace agreement.

The government postponed the referendum to 11 April 2016 and the referendum was held amid fears of violence. The referendum will attempt to unify the Darfur region as it was in 1994 after it was split further in five states in 2012.

== Options ==
The referendum gave the electorate a choice between either "the creation of a Darfur Region composed of the five states" or the "retention of the status quo of five states". The referendum was organised and supervised by the Sudanese National Election Commission and the peace agreement allowed for international monitors.

Following the referendum, if the majority of the electorate select the option to form an Darfur Region, then the existing Darfur Regional Authority would form a constitutional commission to determine the competencies and structure of an autonomous Darfur Regional Government. The constitution will then have to be approved by the legislative assemblies of the three Darfur states in joint sitting within three months of the referendum. This process would be overseen by the President of Sudan.

== Referendum ==
The referendum offered the residents of Darfur two options:

- To combine the five states of Darfur into a single administrative region.

Or

- To maintain the status quo of Darfur being administered as five separate states.

On the ballot paper, a single house was used as the symbol for the single region option and a group of five houses was used to represent the five states option.

The referendum was held on over three days, between 11 and 13 April 2016.

=== Result ===
The results were announced on 23 April 2016:

Option	Votes	%
Single region	71,920	2.28
Five states	3,081,976	97.72
Total	3,207,596	100
Registered voters/turnout	3,535,281	72.9

== Reaction ==
=== International ===
- United States: The United States expressed concern over the atmosphere and the timing of the vote. The US envoy to Sudan stated that "if held under current rules and conditions, a referendum on Darfur cannot be considered a credible expression of the will of the people of Darfur". After this statement, the Sudanese foreign ministry criticized the United States for producing contradicting statements against the ongoing peace process in the region.

== See also ==
- War in Darfur
- Darfur Peace Agreement
