= Darfur =

Region of western Sudan

Coordinates: 13°00′N 25°00′E

Darfur دار فور
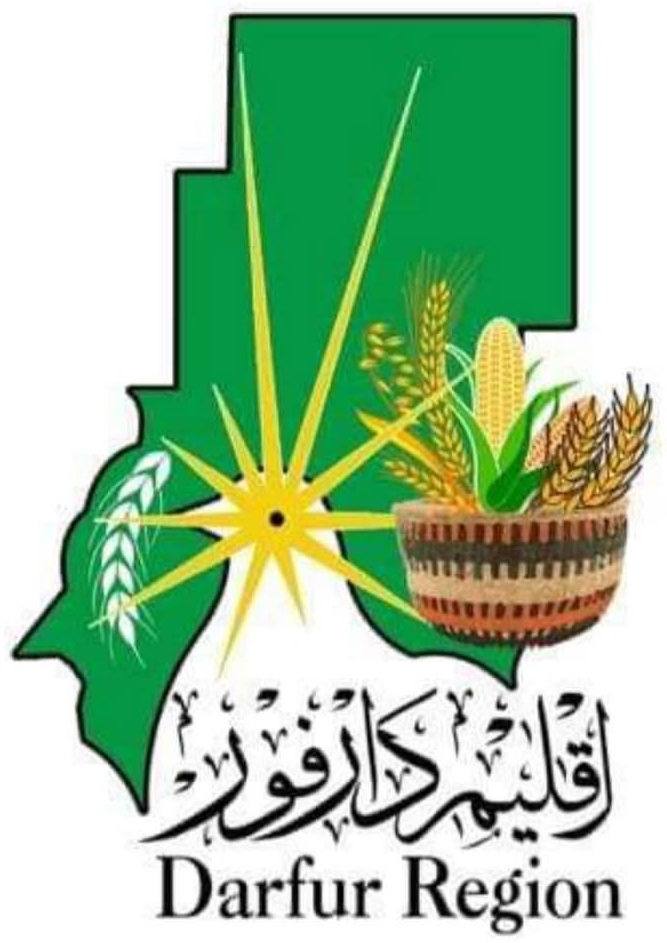
- Flag Coat of arms

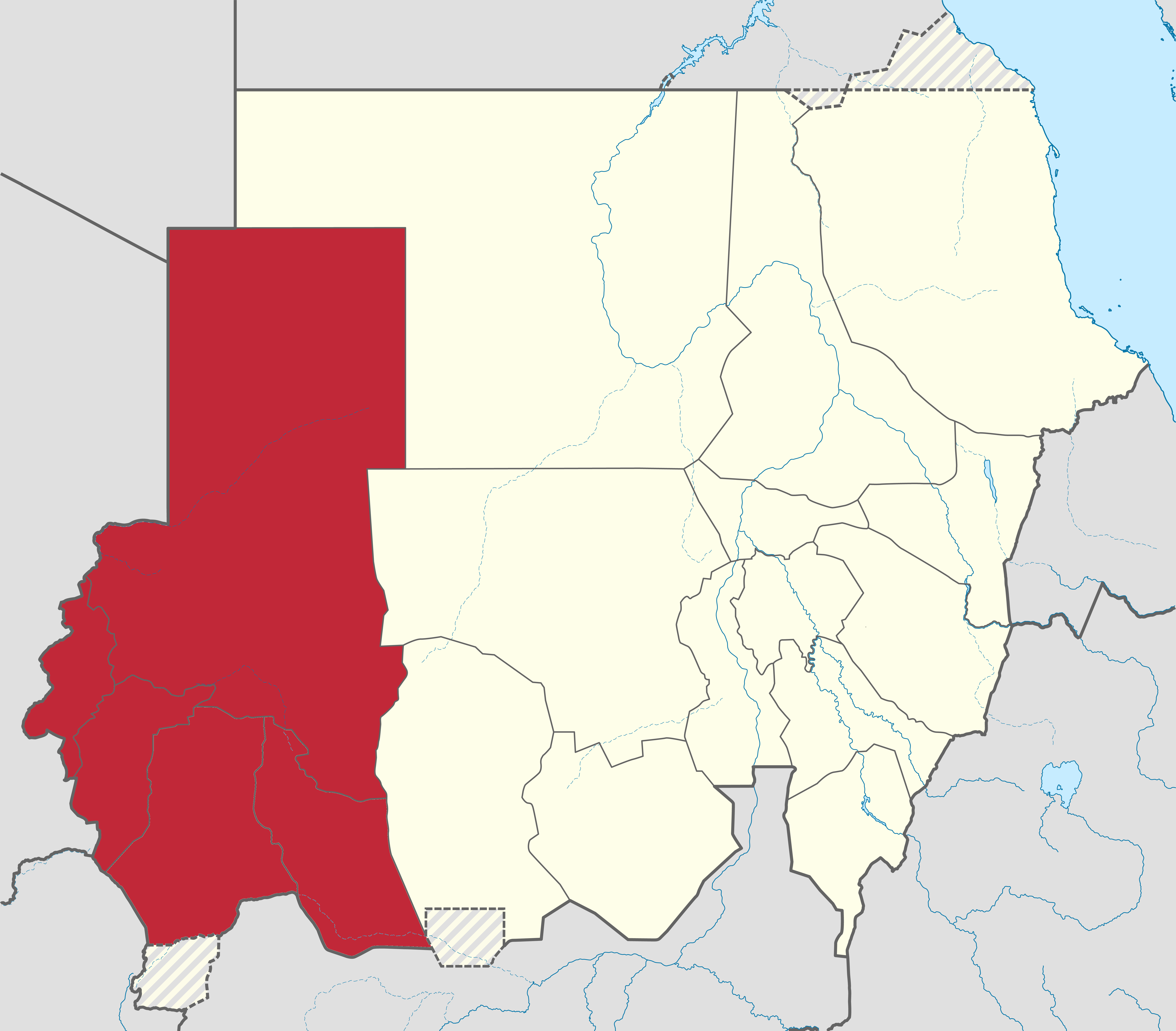
- Location of Darfur in Sudan
- Country: Sudan
- Capital: El Fasher
- Largest city: Nyala

Government
  - Under control by: Government of Peace and Unity; Rapid Support Forces

Area
  - Total: 493,180 km^{2} (190,420 sq mi)

Population
  - Estimate (2018): 11,772,520
- Demonym(s): Darfurian; Darfuri
- Time zone: UTC+2:00 (CAT)
- Languages: Sudanese Arabic, Fur, Zaghawa, Masalit

Darfur is a region of western Sudan covering 493,180 square kilometers (190,420 sq mi). It consists largely of a semi-desert plateau, with the volcanic Marrah Mountains in its center, and is divided into five federal states: Central, East, North, South, and West Darfur.

The Daju people established the first historically attested kingdom in Darfur by the 12th century and were succeeded by the Tunjur people in the 14th century. The Sultanate of Darfur later became a major power in the Sahel under the Keira dynasty. The sultanate was brought under Egyptian rule in 1873–74. After the defeat of the Mahdist State in 1899, Ali Dinar ruled Darfur as sultan until Anglo-Egyptian forces invaded and annexed the region in 1916.

After Sudan became independent in 1956, uneven economic development continued, while regional conflicts contributed to political instability. The War in Darfur began in 2003 between rebel movements and Sudanese government forces and allied Janjaweed militias. The conflict became a major humanitarian crisis, causing hundreds of thousands of deaths and displacing millions of people, and the mass killing has been characterized as the Darfur genocide. Peace agreements were signed in 2006, 2011, and 2020, but violence continued. Since the start of the Sudanese civil war in 2023, there has been considerable fighting in Darfur. The Rapid Support Forces (RSF) have perpetrated the Masalit and El Fasher massacres, and some analysts have described the violence as a genocide.

== Geography ==
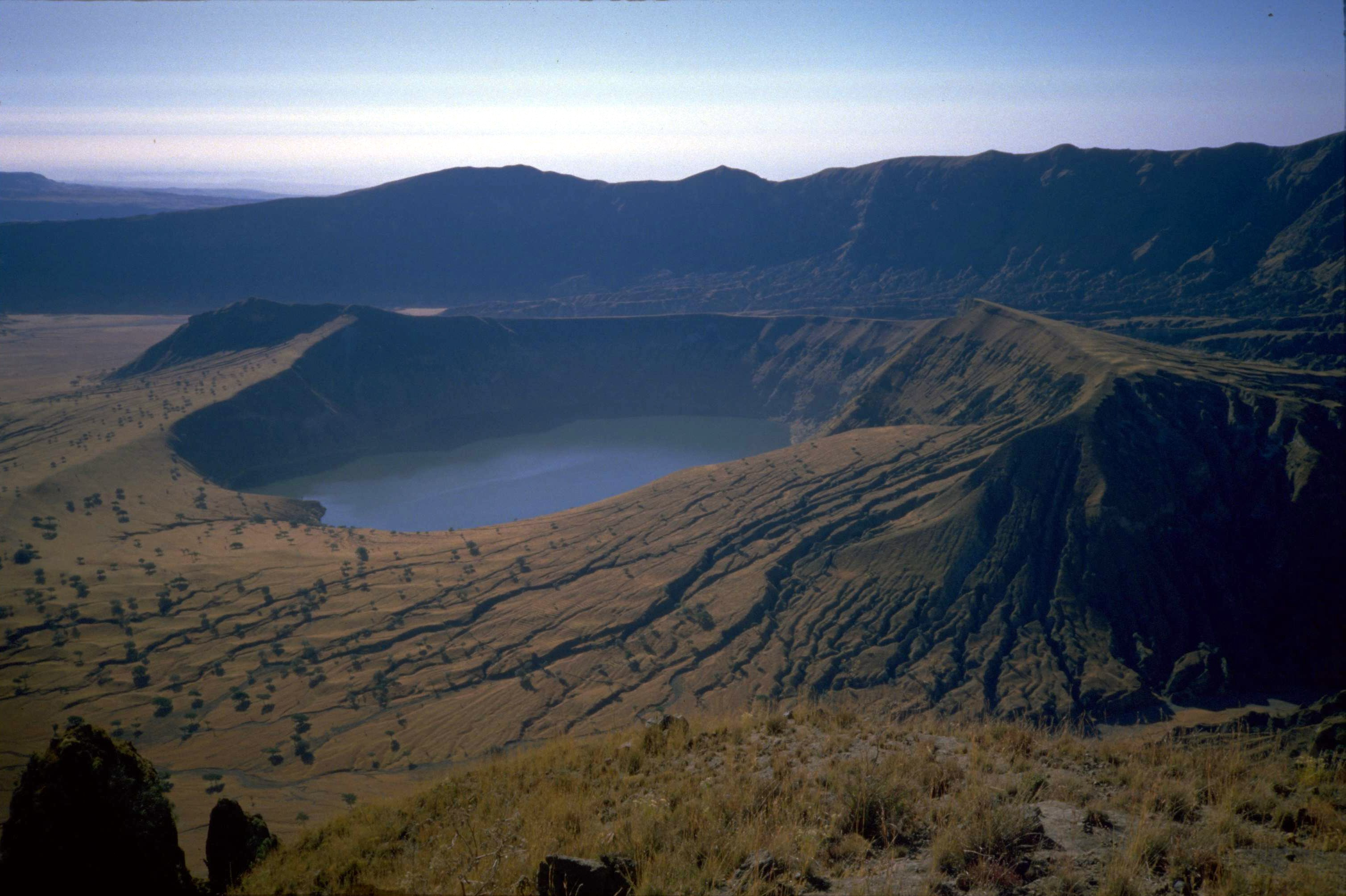
Deriba Crater is at the highest point of the Marrah Mountains

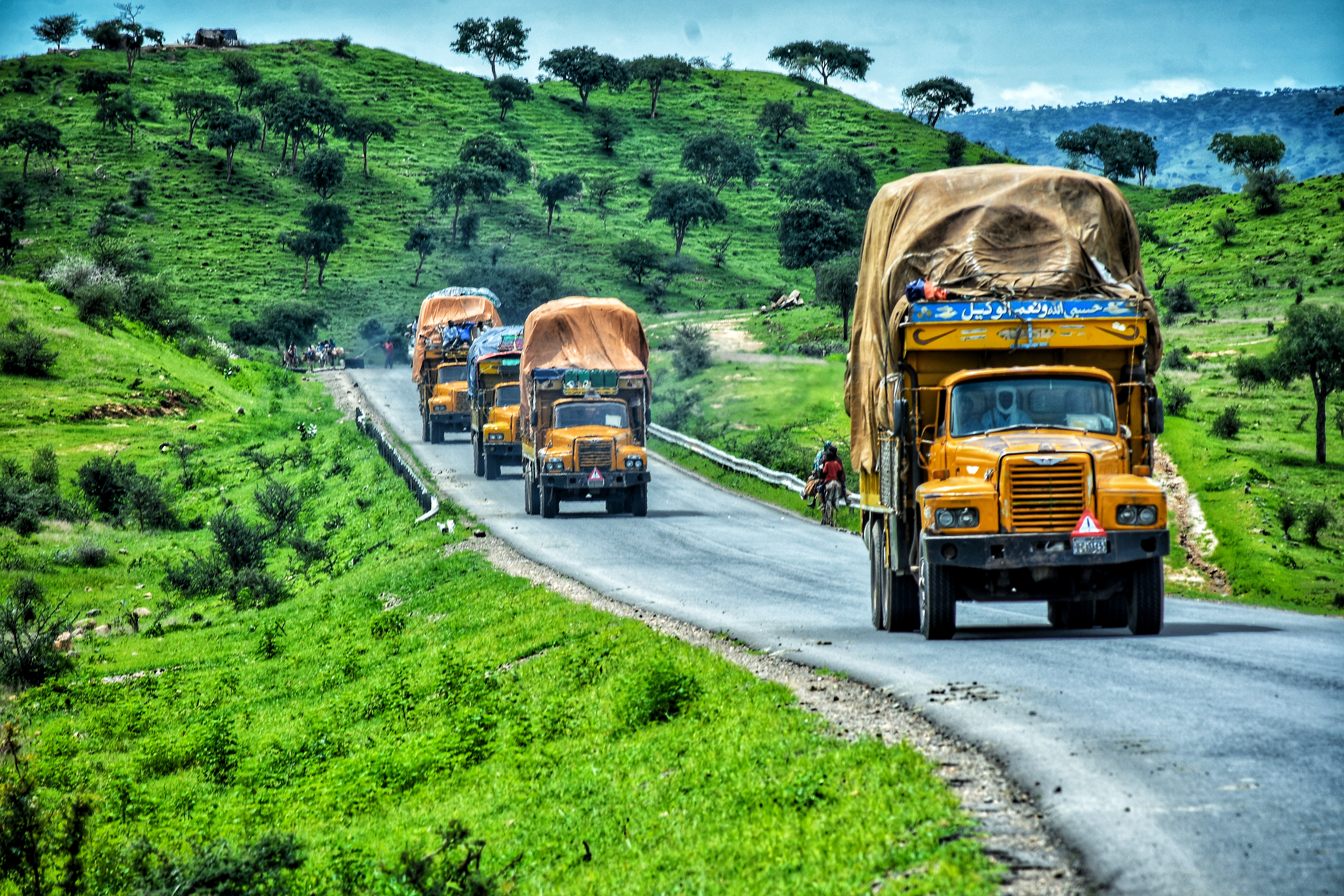
Overland trucks en route near Jebel Marra, 2019

Darfur covers an area of 493,180 square kilometers (190,420 sq mi), approximately the size of mainland Spain. It is largely a semi-desert plateau with the Marrah Mountains (Jebel Marra), a range of volcanic peaks rising up to 3,042 meters (9,980 ft) of elevation above sea level, and a topographic prominence of 2512 m, in the center of the region. The region's main towns are Al Fashir, Geneina, and Nyala.

There are four main features of its physical geography. The whole eastern half of Darfur is covered with plains and low hills of sandy soils, known as goz, and sandstone hills. In many places the goz can only be inhabited where there are water reservoirs or deep boreholes. While dry, goz may also support rich pasture and arable land. To the north the goz is overtaken by the desert sands of the Sahara. A second feature are the wadis, which range from seasonal watercourses that flood only occasionally during the wet season to large wadis that flood for most of the rains and flow from western Darfur hundreds of kilometres west to Lake Chad. Many wadis have pans of alluvium with rich heavy soil that are also difficult to cultivate. Western Darfur is dominated by the third feature, basement rock, sometimes covered with a thin layer of sandy soil. Basement rock is too infertile to be farmed, but provides sporadic forest cover that can be grazed by animals. The fourth and final feature are the Marrah Mountains and Daju Hills, volcanic plugs created by a massif, that rise up to a peak at Deriba crater where there is a small area of temperate climate, high rainfall and permanent springs of water.

Remote sensing has detected the imprint of a vast underground lake under Darfur. The potential water deposits are estimated at 49,500 km^{2} (19,110 sq mi). The lake, during epochs when the region was more humid, would have contained about 2,500 km^{3} (600 cubic miles) of water. It may have dried up thousands of years ago.

== History ==
The first historical mention of the word Fur occurs in 1664 in the account by J. M. Vansleb, a German traveler, of a visit to Egypt. It is claimed that, like sūdān, fūr means "blacks", and was the name given by the arriving Arab sultans within Darfur to the original inhabitants of the country such as the Binga, Banda, etc. As the historic dynasty's physical appearance became more "Africanized" from intermarriage with black wives and concubines, the appearance of the sultans darkened correspondingly and they became known by the appellation of their subjects, Fūr. Most of the region consists of a semi-arid plain and thus appears unsuitable for developing a large and complex civilization. But the Marrah Mountains offer plentiful water, and by the 12th century the Daju people, succeeding the semi-legendary Tora culture, created the first historical attestable kingdom. They were centered in the Marrah Mountains and left records of valuable rock engravings, stone architecture and a (orally preserved) list of kings. The Tunjur replaced the Daju in the fourteenth century and the Daju established new headquarters in Abyei, Denga, Darsila and Mongo in the current Chad. The Tunjur sultans intermarried with the Fur and sultan Musa Sulayman (reigned c. 1667 – c. 1695) is considered the founder of the Keira dynasty. Darfur became a great power of the Sahel under the Keira dynasty, expanding its borders as far east as the Atbarah River and attracting immigrants from Bornu and Bagirmi. During the mid-18th century conflict between rival factions wracked the country, and external war pitted Darfur against Sennar and Wadai. In 1875, the weakened kingdom was destroyed by the Egyptian ruler set up in Khartoum, largely through the machinations of Sebehr Rahma, a slave-trader, who was competing with the dar over access to ivory in Bahr el Ghazal to the south of Darfur.

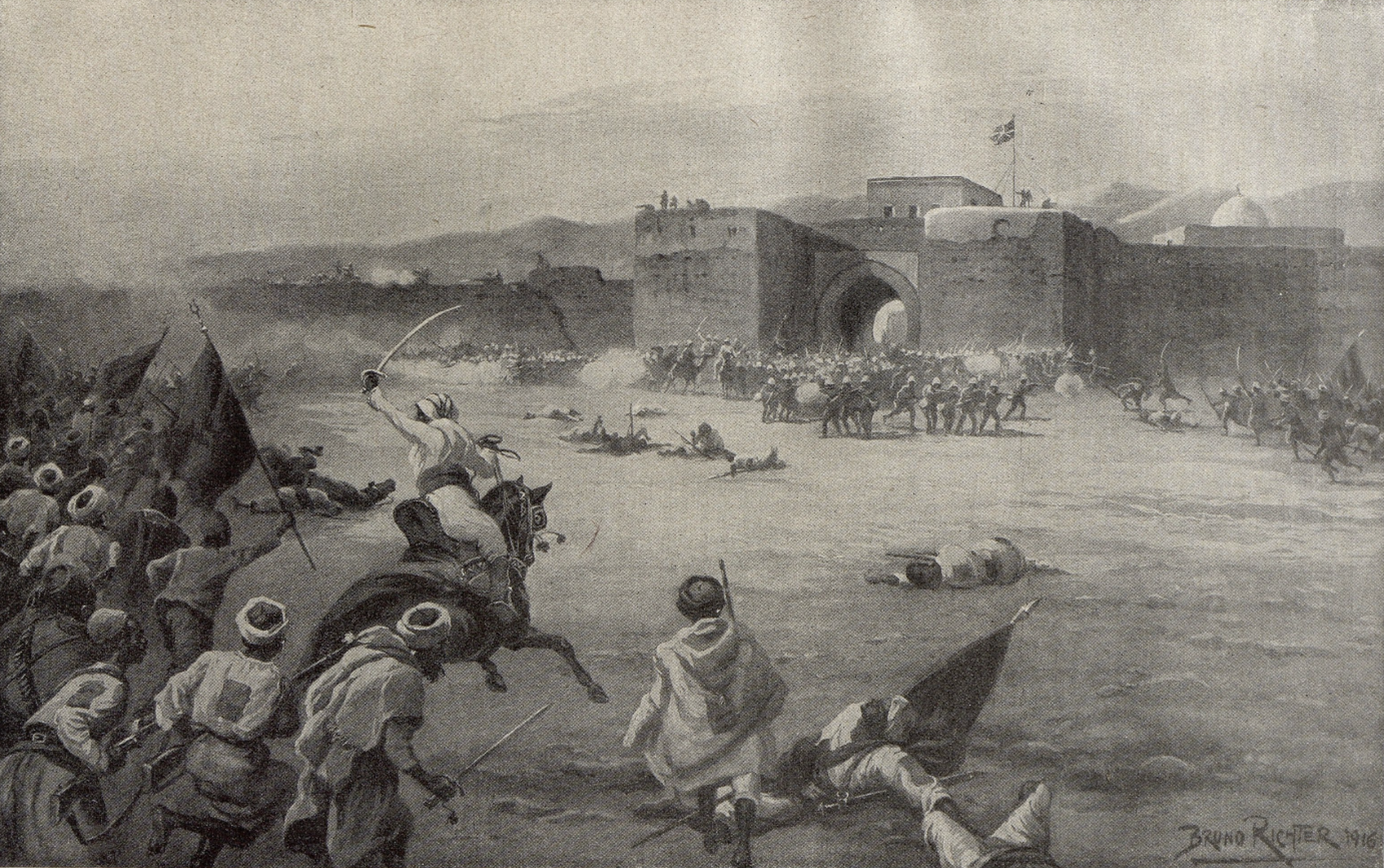
Sultan Ali Dinar attacks the British troops in northern Sudan, 1916

The Darfuris were restive under Egyptian rule, but were no more predisposed to accept the rule of the self-proclaimed Mahdi, Muhammad Ahmad, when in 1882 his Emir of Darfur, who came from the Southern Darfur Arab Rizeigat tribe led by Sheikh Madibbo, defeated the Ottoman forces led by Slatin Pasha (that had just invaded Egypt earlier that year) in Darfur. When Ahmad's successor, Abdallahi ibn Muhammad, himself an Arab of Southern Darfur from the Ta'isha tribe, demanded that the pastoralist tribes provide soldiers, several tribes rose up in revolt. Following the defeat of Abdallahi at Omdurman in 1899 by an Anglo-Egyptian expeditionary force, the new Anglo-Egyptian government recognized Ali Dinar as the sultan of Darfur and largely left the Dar to its own affairs except for a nominal annual tribute.

In 1916, after the British government suspected that the sultan was falling under the influence of the Ottoman government, an expedition was launched from Egypt to capture and annex Darfur into the Anglo-Egyptian Sudan. The colonial government directed financial and administrative resources to the tribes of central Sudan near Khartoum - while the outlying regions such as Darfur remained mostly forgotten and ignored. K. D. D. Henderson was the last British governor of Darfur.

=== Under Sudanese rule ===
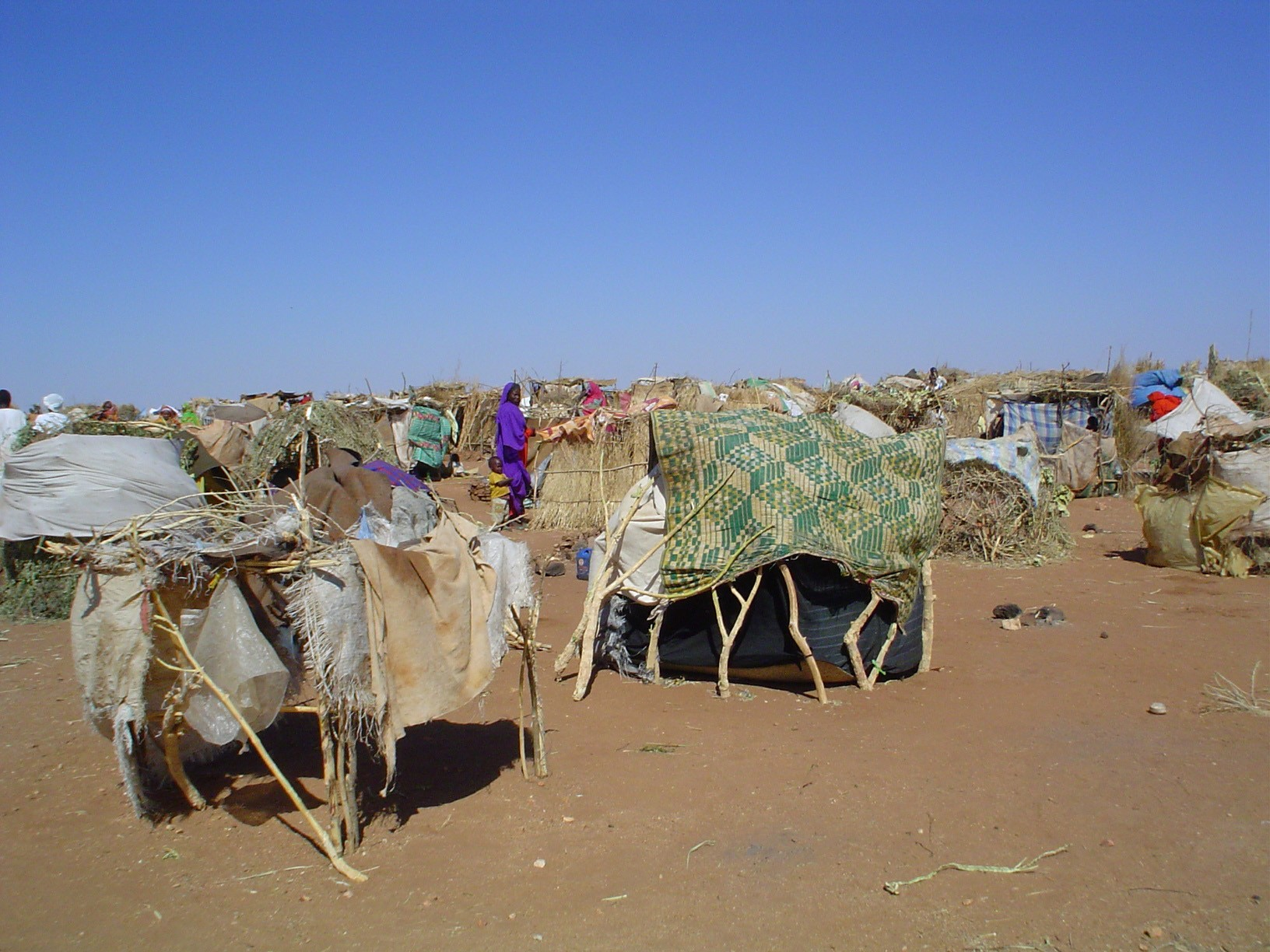
Camp of Darfuris internally displaced by the War in Darfur.

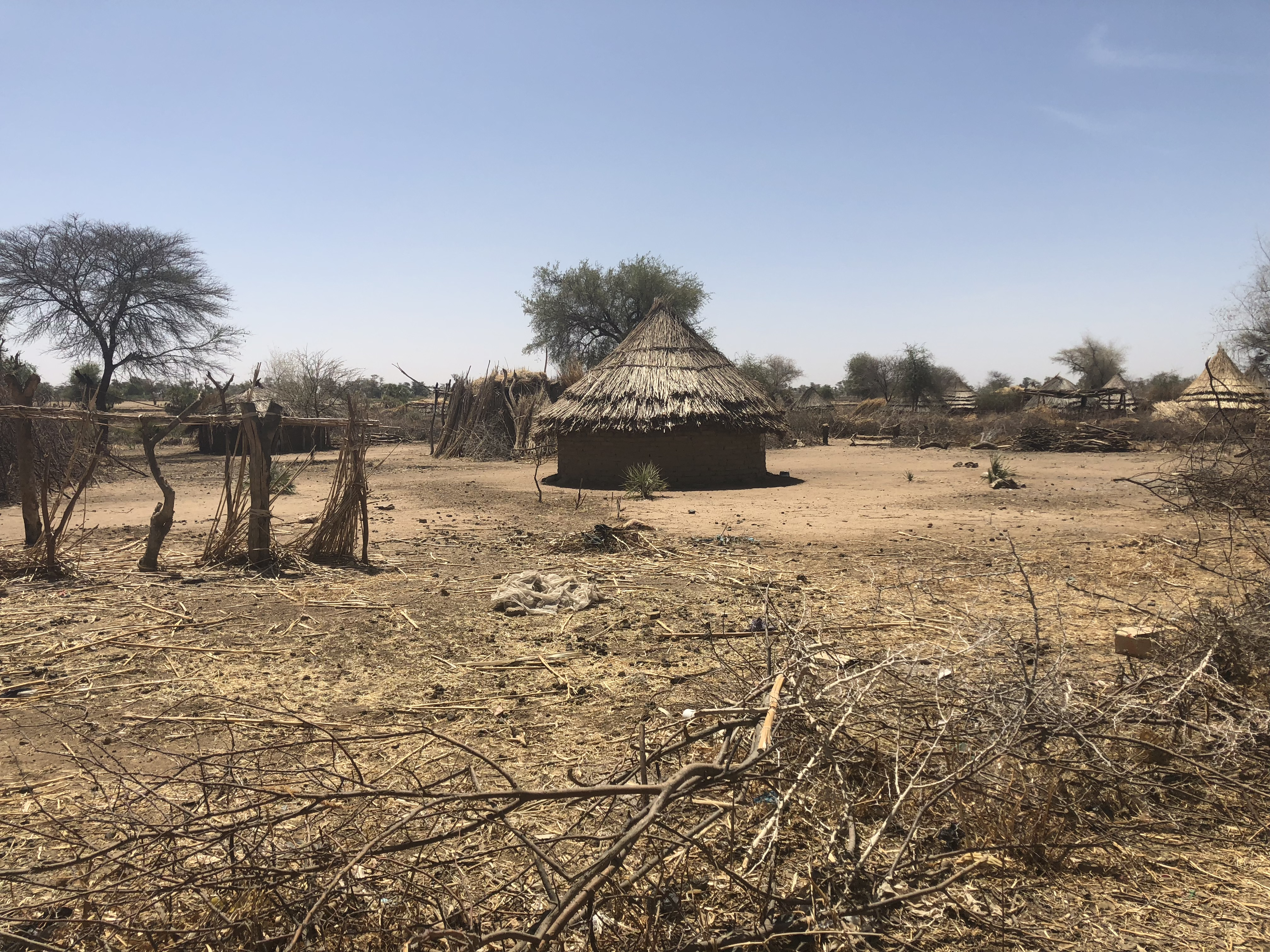
A village in South Darfur

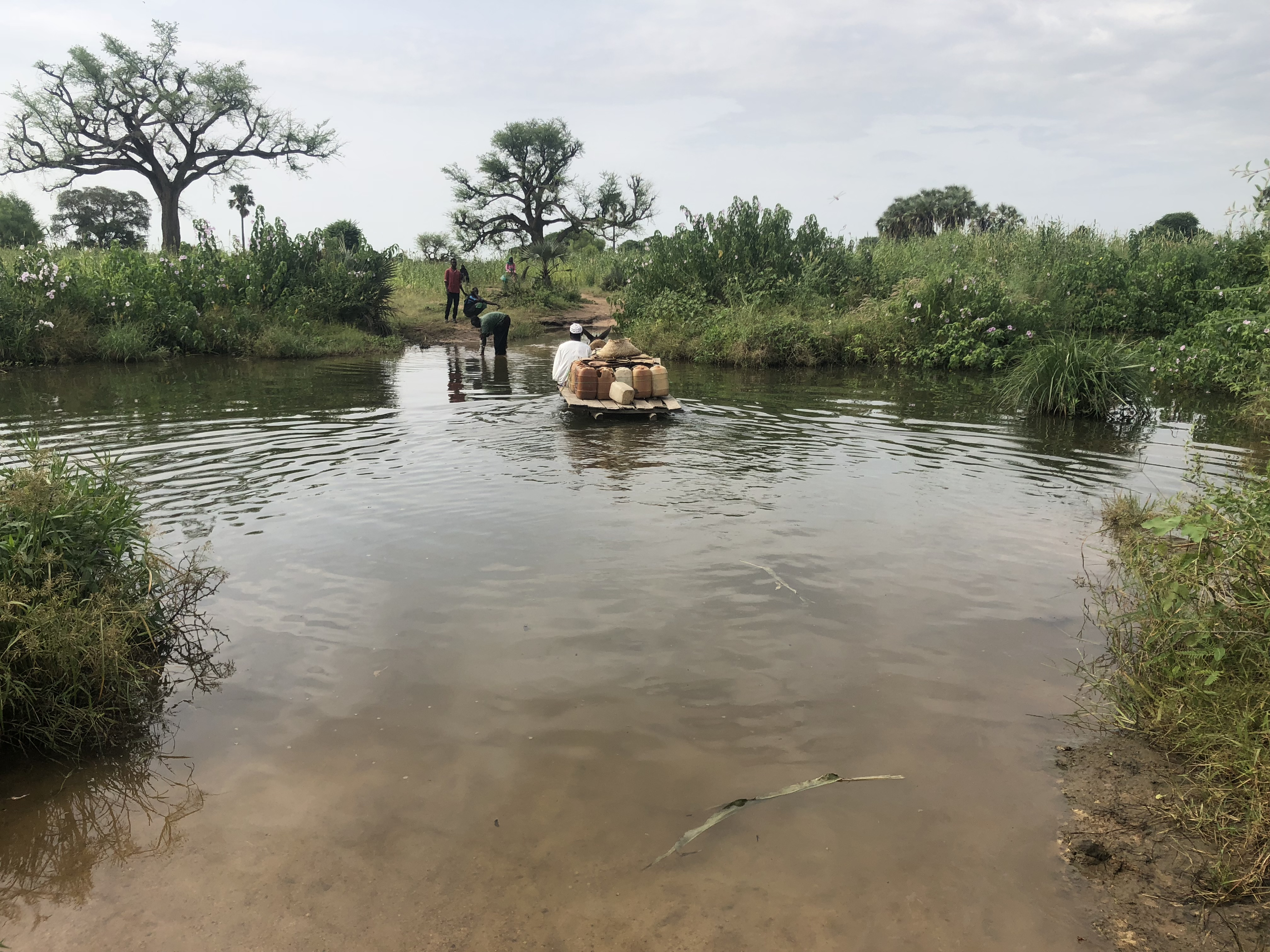
A villager in Darfur, Sudan, crosses the overflowing stream.

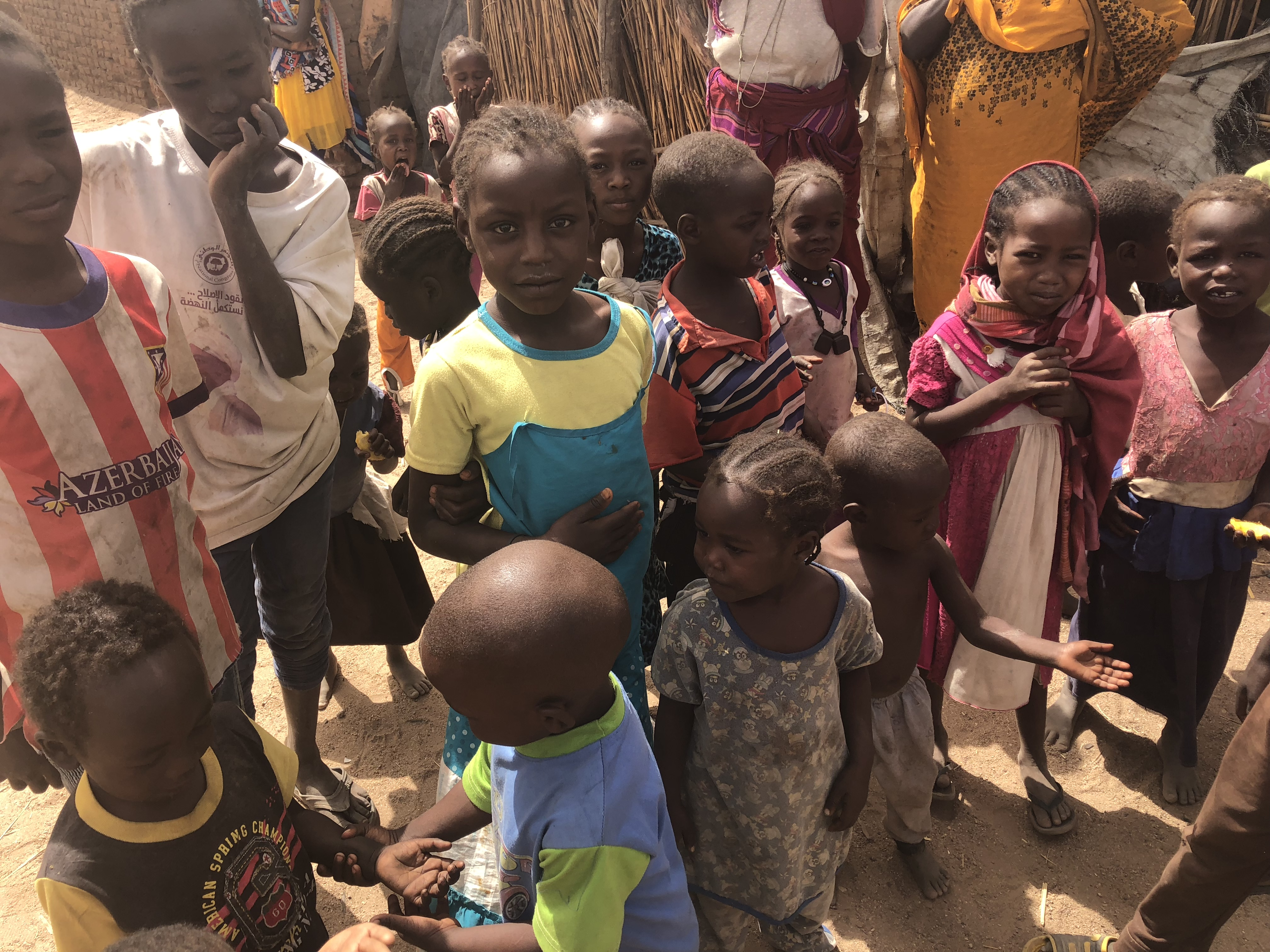
Sudanese children in an IDP camp in Darfur.

A pattern of skewed economic development continued after Sudan achieved political independence in 1956. The governor at the time of independence was Ali Abdallah Abu Sinn, who had joined the civil service in 1923 and served in Darfur since 1946. In August 1958, he was succeeded by Ahmad Makki Abdo, who remained in power despite the coup d'état of that year, until he was finally dismissed in December 1959 and replaced by al-Tijani Sa'd. The proxy wars between Sudan, Libya and Chad added an element of political instability. Darfurians began to respond to the ideology of Arab supremacy propagated by Libyan leader Muammar al-Gaddafi (in power 1969–2011). A famine in the mid-1980s disrupted many societal structures and led to the first significant modern fighting amongst Darfuris. A low-level conflict continued for the next fifteen years, with the government co-opting and arming Arab Janjaweed militias against its enemies. The fighting reached a peak in 2003 with the beginning of the Darfur conflict, in which the resistance coalesced into a roughly cohesive rebel movement. In March 2004, human-rights groups and the UN came to regard the conflict as one of the worst humanitarian disasters in the world. Insurgency and counter-insurgency have led to 480,000 deaths (the Khartoum government disputes the numbers). This has been labeled as the Darfur genocide. "By 2010 about 300,000 had died, according to the UN best estimate, and about 3,000,000 were forced into refugee camps." Over 2.8 million people have become displaced since 2003, many of whom were children (see Lost Boys of Sudan). Many of these refugees have gone into camps where emergency aid has created conditions that, although extremely basic, are better than in the villages, which offer no protection against the various militias that operate in the region.

Nearly two-thirds of the population continues to struggle to survive in remote villages. Virtually no foreigners visit the region because of the fear of kidnapping, and only some non-governmental organizations continue to provide long-term grass-roots assistance. As of 2015 the United Nations is in discussion with the Government of Sudan over the withdrawal of UNAMID, the peacekeeping force, which is the largest in the world. Other UN agencies (such as the WFP) might exit.

During the existence of the Calais Jungle refugee camp, Darfur was listed as a major source of the camp's inhabitants.

=== Peace process ===
==== Darfur Peace Agreement (also known as Abuja Agreement) ====
The Government of Sudan and the Sudan Liberation Movement of Minni Minnawi signed a Darfur Peace Agreement in 2006. Only one rebel group, the Sudan Liberation Movement, subscribed to the agreement; the Justice and Equality Movement rejected it, resulting in a continuation of the conflict. The agreement includes provisions for wealth-sharing and power-sharing and established a Transitional Darfur Regional Authority to help administer Darfur until a referendum could take place on the future of the region. The leader of the Sudan Liberation Movement, Minni Minnawi, was appointed Senior Assistant to the President of Sudan and Chairman of the transitional authority in 2007.

==== Doha Agreement ====
In December 2010, representatives of the Liberation and Justice Movement, an umbrella organisation of ten rebel groups, formed in February of that year, started a fresh round of talks with the Sudanese Government in Doha, Qatar. A new rebel group, the Sudanese Alliance Resistance Forces in Darfur, was formed and the Justice and Equality Movement planned further talks. The talks ended on 19 December without a new peace agreement, but participants agreed on basic principles, including a regional authority and a referendum on autonomy for Darfur. The possibility of a Darfuri Vice-President was also discussed.

In January 2011, the leader of the Liberation and Justice Movement, Dr. Tijani Sese, stated that the movement had accepted the core proposals of the Darfur peace document proposed by the joint-mediators in Doha; the proposals included a $300,000,000 compensation package for victims of atrocities in Darfur and special courts to conduct trials of persons accused of human-rights violations. Proposals for a new Darfur Regional Authority were also included; this authority would have an executive council of 18 ministers and would remain in place for five years. The current three Darfur states and state governments would also continue to exist during this period. In February 2011 the Sudanese Government rejected the idea of a single region headed by a vice-president from the region.

On 29 January, the leaders of the Liberation and Justice Movement and the Justice and Equality Movement issued a joint statement affirming their commitment to the Doha negotiations and agreement to attend the Doha forum on 5 February. The Sudanese government had not yet agreed to attend the forum on that date and instead favoured an internal peace process without the involvement of rebel groups. Later in February, the Sudanese Government agreed to return to the Doha peace forum with a view to complete a new peace agreement by the end of that month. On 25 February, both the Liberation and Justice Movement and the Justice and Equality Movement announced that they had rejected the peace document proposed by the mediators in Doha. The main sticking points were the issues of a Darfuri vice-president and compensation for victims. The Sudanese government had not commented on the peace document.

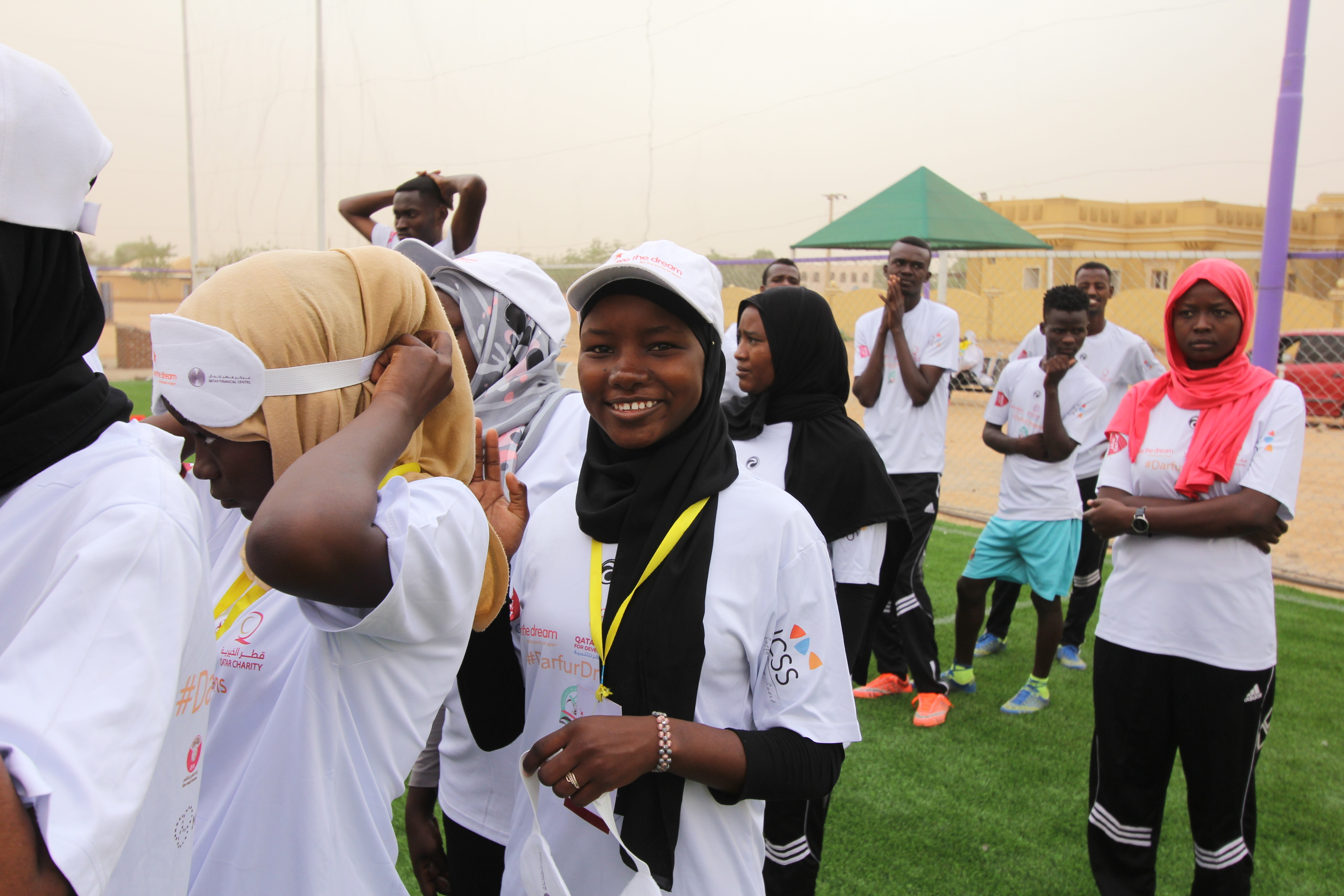
Internally displaced people in El Fasher in 2018

At the Doha Peace Forum in June, the Joint Mediators proposed a new Darfur Peace Agreement, which would supersede the Abuja Agreement of 2005 and if signed, would halt preparations for a Darfur status referendum. The proposal included provisions for a Darfuri Vice-President and an administrative structure that includes both the three states and a strategic regional authority, the Darfur Regional Authority, to oversee Darfur as a whole. The new agreement was signed by the Government of Sudan and the Liberation and Justice Movement on 14 July. The Sudan Liberation Movement and the Justice and Equality Movement did not sign the new document at that time but had three months in which to do so if they wished.

==== 2020 peace agreement (Juba Agreement) ====
The Juba Agreement was signed on 31 August 2020 in Juba, South Sudan, between the Sudanese authorities and rebel factions to end armed hostilities. However, further tribal clashes had continued during 2021.

==== Sudanese Civil War (2023–present) ====
During the Sudanese Civil War, there has been considerable fighting in the Darfur region. This includes the Masalit Massacres and El Fasher massacre perpetuated by the Rapid Support Forces (RSF), causing some analysts to declare a genocide in Sudan.

Tens of thousands of people are feared killed in the city of El Fasher, following its capture by the RSF in late October 2025.

== Languages ==
Linguistic map of the non-Arab peoples of Darfur.

Languages of Darfur include Daju, Erenga (or Sungor), Fongoro, Fulbe (or Fulfulde), Fur (thus the name of the region), Masalit, Sinyar, Tama, Midob, and Zaghawa.

The following languages are spoken in Darfur according to Ethnologue.

- Fur language
- Maban languages
  - Masalit language
- Taman languages
  - Tama language
  - Sungor language
- Saharan languages
  - Zaghawa language
  - Kanuri language (Bornu)
  - Berti language [extinct]
- Kresh languages
  - Gbaya language
- Bongo-Bagirmi languages
  - Tar Gula language
  - Yulu language
- Daju languages
  - Daju language
  - Baygo language [extinct]
- Nubian languages
  - Midob language
  - Birked language
  - Fulfulde language
  - Sinyar language
  - Fongoro language [extinct]

== Government ==
=== Regional governance ===
The Darfur Peace Agreement of 2006 established a Transitional Darfur Regional Authority as an interim authority for the region. The agreement stated that a referendum on the status of Darfur should be held no later than 2011. Minni Minnawi was the first chair of this authority, holding that office from April 2007 until December 2010, when he was succeeded by Shartai Jaafar Abdel Hakam. The peace agreement that was signed in July 2011 saw the Transitional Darfur Regional Authority reconstituted as the Darfur Regional Authority with executive and legislative functions. The chairperson of the Darfur Regional Authority, Tijani Sese, assumed the post on 20 September 2011. The regional authority was dissolved in July 2016 following a referendum, on the status of the Darfur region within Sudan. As part of the Sudanese transition to democracy, a Darfur Regional Government was re-established in August 2021 with Minni Minawi as Regional Governor. The rival Government of Peace and Unity established a parallel regional administration in 2025 following their takeover of the Darfur region during the Sudanese civil war.

=== States ===
N: North Darfur; O: West Darfur; C: Central Darfur; S: South Darfur; E: East Darfur

The Darfur region is divided into five federal states:

- Central Darfur
- East Darfur
- North Darfur
- South Darfur
- West Darfur
- Dar Erenga

== Demographics and economy ==
In 2008, Darfur's population was 7.5 million. This in an increase by nearly six times from 1973 (1.3 million). 52% are aged 16 years or younger.

Darfur's budget was US$286 million in 2008.

== See also ==
- 2010 Sahel famine
- Darfur genocide

== Bibliography ==
- Arkell, A. J., "A History of Darfur. Part II: The Tunjur etc", Sudan Notes and Records, 32, 2 (1951), 207–238.
- Asher, M.J.,"In Search of the Forty Days Road" Penguin. 1984
- Daly, M.W., Darfur's Sorrow: A History of Destruction and Genocide, Cambridge 2010.
- Elliesie, Hatem, "Sudan under the Constraints of (International) Human Rights Law and Humanitarian Law: The Case of Darfur", in Hatem Elliesie (ed.), Islam and Human Rights / al-islam wa-huquq al-insan, Frankfurt, Berlin, Bern, Bruxelles, New York, Oxford, Vienna 2010, pp. 193–217 ISBN 978-3-631-57848-3
- Elliesie, Hatem et al., "Different Approaches to Genocide Trials under National Jurisdiction on the African Continent: The Rwandan, Ethiopian and Sudanese Cases", in Recht in Afrika, Cologne 2009, 12/1, pp. 21–67. ISBN 978-3-89645-804-9
- Foerstel, K. "Crisis in Darfur" CQ Global Researcher (2008). 2, 243-270. online
- Herr, Alexis, Darfur Genocide: The Essential Reference Guide (2020) excerpt
- Johnson, Douglas H. The Root Causes of Sudan's Civil Wars (Indiana UP, 2003), ISBN 0-253-21584-6
- Kiernan, Ben. Blood and Soil: A World History of Genocide and Extermination from Sparta to Darfur (2009) excerpt
- O'Fahey, R. S., The Darfur Sultanate: A History, London 2008.
- Young, Osman, Abusin, Asher, Egemi "Livelihoods, Power, and Choice: The Vulnerability of the Northern Rizaygat, Darfur, Sudan" Feinstein Centre for Marginalized Peoples. Tufts University January 2009
