= Darfur Peace Agreement =

2006, 2011, and 2020 Sudanese agreements

The Darfur Peace Agreement may refer to one of three peace agreements that were signed by the Government of Sudan and Darfur-based rebel groups in 2006, 2011 and 2020 with the intention of ending the Darfur Conflict.

== Abuja Agreement (2006) ==
The 2006 Darfur Peace Agreement, also known as the Abuja Agreement, was signed on May 5, 2006 by the government of Sudan headed by Omar al-Bashir along with a faction of the SLA led by Minni Minnawi. However, the agreement was rejected by two other, smaller groups, the Justice and Equality Movement (JEM) and a rival faction of the SLA led by Abdul Wahid al Nur.

The 115-page agreement was broad in scope and included matters related to national and state power-sharing, demilitarization of the Janjaweed and other militias, the integration of SLM/A and JEM troops into the Sudanese Armed Forces and police, a system of federal wealth-sharing for the promotion of Darfur's economic interests, a referendum on the future status of Darfur and measures to promote the flow of humanitarian aid into the region.

The accord was orchestrated by the chief negotiator Salim Ahmed Salim (working on behalf of the African Union), U.S. Deputy Secretary of State Robert B. Zoellick, AU representatives, and other foreign officials operating in Abuja, Nigeria. Representatives of the AU, Nigeria, Libya, the United States, the UK, the UN, the EU, the Arab League, Egypt, Canada, Norway and the Netherlands served as witnesses to the agreement.

=== Specifics of the Agreement ===
The agreement required the Sudanese Government of National Unity to complete verifiable disarmament and demobilization of the Janjaweed militia by mid-October 2006; it also placed restrictions on the movements of the Popular Defence Forces and required their downsizing. A detailed sequencing and phasing schedule was set up to ensure that the African Union certified that the Janjaweed and other armed militia were disarmed before rebel forces assembled and prepared for their own disarmament and demobilization. The agreement stipulated that 4,000 former combatants be integrated into the Sudanese Armed Forces, 1,000 be integrated into the police forces, and 3,000 be supported through education and training programs. The former combatants were to be integrated in groups of 100-150 and comprise 33 percent of each integrated battalion.

Democratic processes were laid out for the people of Darfur to choose their leaders and determine their status as a region. Rebel signatories of the agreement were awarded the 4th highest position in the Sudanese Government of National Unity: Senior Assistant to the President and Chairperson of the newly established Transitional Darfur Regional Authority (TDRA). The TDRA was given responsibility for implementation of the peace agreement in Darfur, with the rebel movements having effective control of that body. In July 2010, a popular referendum was to be held to decide whether to establish Darfur as a unitary region with a single government. For the three-year period prior to elections, the agreement granted the rebel movements twelve seats in the National Assembly in Khartoum, 21 seats in each of the Darfur State legislatures, one State Governor and two Deputy State Governors in Darfur, senior positions in State Ministries, and key posts in local governments.

The accord committed the international community to holding a donors’ conference to pledge additional funds for Darfur, and invited the TDRA Chairperson to present to that conference a summary of needs and priorities. The GNU is mandated to contribute $300 million initially and then $200 million/year for the next two years to rebuild the region. A Joint Assessment Mission – modeled on the one done for Southern reconstruction after the Comprehensive (North-South) Peace Agreement – was to be established to determine the specific reconstruction and development needs of Darfur.

Buffer zones were to be established around camps for internally displaced persons and humanitarian assistance corridors. A commission was created to work with the United Nations to help refugees and displaced persons return to their homes. The agreement stated that the Sudanese Government would provide $30 million in compensation to victims of the conflict.

== Doha Agreement (2011) ==
The 2011 Darfur Peace Agreement, also known as the Doha Agreement, was signed in July 2011 between the government of Sudan and the Liberation and Justice Movement. This agreement established a compensation fund for victims of the Darfur conflict, allowed the President of Sudan to appoint a vice-president from Darfur, and established a new Darfur Regional Authority to oversee the region until a referendum can determine its permanent status within the Republic of Sudan. The agreement also provided for power sharing at the national level: movements that sign the agreement will be entitled to nominate two ministers and two four ministers of state at the federal level and will be able to nominate 20 members to the national legislature. The movements will be entitled to nominate two state governors in the Darfur region.

== Juba Agreement (2020) ==
On 31 August 2020, a comprehensive peace agreement was signed between the Transitional Government of Sudan on one side and the Sudan Liberation Movement/Army and the Justice and Equality Movement on the other. The agreement stated that the two former rebel groups would join the transition to democracy in Sudan through peaceful means.

Under the terms of the agreement, the factions that signed are entitled to three seats on the sovereignty council, a total of five ministers in the transitional cabinet and a quarter of seats in the transitional legislature. At a regional level, signatories are entitled to between 30 and 40% of the seats on transitional legislatures of their home states or regions.

== See also ==
- War in Darfur
