= Liberation and Justice Movement =

Darfur rebel group

- Leader: Abu Garda
- Dates active: February 2010 – present
- Active regions: Darfur
- Wars: War in Darfur

The Liberation and Justice Movement is a rebel group in the Darfur conflict in Sudan, led by Abu Garda. The Liberation and Justice Movement is an alliance of ten smaller Darfuri rebel organisations which formed a new grouping on 23 February 2010. On 20 March 2010, the Liberation and Justice Movement signed a cease-fire agreement with the Sudanese Government and agreed to talks that could lead to a final peace agreement. The Liberation and Justice Movement participated in the Doha peace negotiations held in December 2010 and in January 2011, its leader stated that the movement had accepted the core proposals of the Darfur peace document proposed by the joint-mediators. On 29 January 2011, the leaders of the Liberation and Justice Movement and of the rival Justice and Equality Movement issued a joint statement stating their commitment to the Doha negotiations and agreed to attend the Doha forum in February 2011. The Liberation and Justice Movement signed a new Darfur Peace Agreement with the Sudanese Government in July 2011; however, various factions of the group have merged with the Justice and Equality Movement.

== See also ==
- Darfur conflict
- Justice and Equality Movement
- Sudan Liberation Movement
