= El Fasher =

City in Western Sudan

El Fasher الفاشر
- City
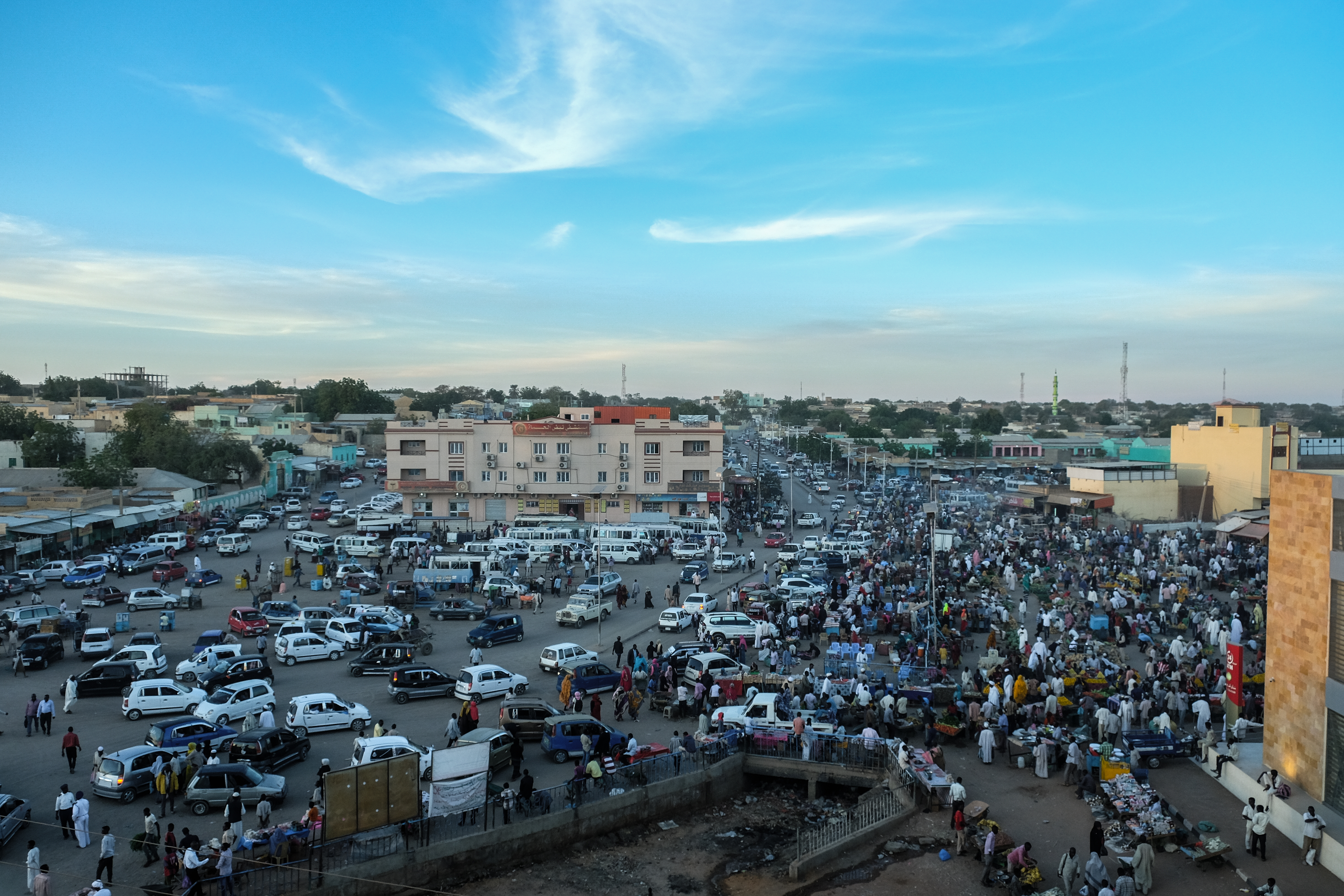
- Aerial view of El Fashir

- Location in Sudan
- Coordinates: 13°37′50″N 25°21′0″E
- Country: Sudan
- State: North Darfur
- Control: Rapid Support Forces

Population (2025)
  - Total: 252,609 (Note: population figures vary due to war and refugees)
- Time zone: UTC+02:00 (CAT)

El Fasher (also alternatively rendered as Al-Fashir; Arabic: الفاشر, romanized: al-Fāshir) is a city in western Sudan. It serves as the capital of the North Darfur State, is located in the Darfur region of Sudan, and is 195 kilometres (121 mi) northeast of Nyala. A historical caravan post, El Fasher is located at an elevation of about 700 metres (2,300 ft). The city serves as an agricultural marketing point for the cereals and fruits grown in the surrounding region. El Fasher is linked by road to both Geneina and Umm Keddada.

The city was the site of a major siege during the ongoing Sudanese civil war, which lasted 18 months, before falling to the Rapid Support Forces (RSF) in October 2025. Shortly after the city's capture by the RSF, an estimated 60,000–68,000 civilians were killed in the El Fasher massacre. By January 2026, it was described as a ghost town.

== History ==
El Fasher's origins date back to the late 18th century, when Abdul Rahman el-Rashid, Sultan of Darfur, moved his itinerant court (fashir) to a site called Rahad Tendelti while campaigning in the region of northern Darfur as it was a vital area for a settlement and grazing; eventually, the site was renamed to Al-Fashir. A town developed around the sultan's palace grounds. It fell to the British during the invasion of Darfur in November 1916.

Al Fashir University was created in 1990 by decree of President Omar al-Bashir and officially opened in February 1991 in premises west of El Fasher Airport and south of the Al Fashir Secondary School.

During the 2010 El Fasher protests nine people were killed by authorities.

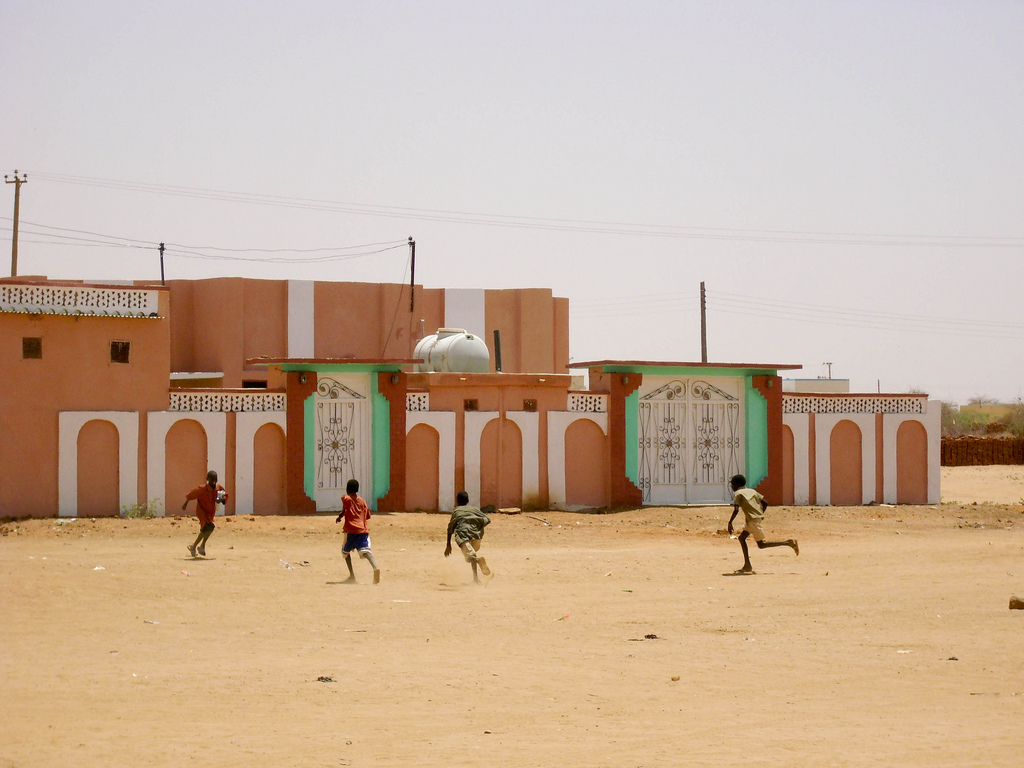
Children playing in the streets of El Fasher, 2006

A series of sieges began in the city in April 2023 when the ongoing civil war in Sudan broke out. El Fasher was besieged by the Rapid Support Forces (RSF) from April 2024 to November 2025, when the RSF captured the city. The United Nations has warned that the civilian population of the city faced starvation and a humanitarian crisis, and has been in constant danger since the Rapid Support Forces indiscriminately bombarded public areas such as the city's central marketplace. Widespread killings and rape were reported after the city was taken by the RSF on 27 October 2025. By January 2026, it was described as a ghost town.

== Geography ==
=== Climate ===
El Fasher has a hot arid climate (Köppen BWh) with three distinct seasons. There is a bone-dry and relatively "cool" season from October to February when temperatures are merely hot by afternoon and cool in the mornings, which gives way to a sweltering and equally arid "hot season" from March to May with high temperatures around 38 °C or 100 °F and morning lows of 21 °C or 70 °F. The Sahelian monsoon arrives in June and lasts until September, creating a short wet season that produces virtually all the year's rainfall of around 210 millimetres or 8.3 inches, accompanied by much higher humidity than during the remainder of the year.

Climate data for El Fasher (1991–2020 normals, extremes 1961–2020)
Month	Jan	Feb	Mar	Apr	May	Jun	Jul	Aug	Sep	Oct	Nov	Dec	Year
Record high °C (°F)	39.5 (103.1)	41.0 (105.8)	42.2 (108.0)	43.0 (109.4)	46.3 (115.3)	44.2 (111.6)	41.7 (107.1)	43.5 (110.3)	41.5 (106.7)	40.0 (104.0)	38.4 (101.1)	36.7 (98.1)	46.3 (115.3)
Mean daily maximum °C (°F)	29.5 (85.1)	32.5 (90.5)	35.5 (95.9)	38.2 (100.8)	39.2 (102.6)	38.9 (102.0)	36.3 (97.3)	34.1 (93.4)	35.9 (96.6)	36.2 (97.2)	33.1 (91.6)	30.1 (86.2)	35.0 (95.0)
Daily mean °C (°F)	20.3 (68.5)	23.0 (73.4)	26.3 (79.3)	29.4 (84.9)	31.3 (88.3)	31.7 (89.1)	30.1 (86.2)	28.5 (83.3)	29.4 (84.9)	28.8 (83.8)	24.3 (75.7)	21.0 (69.8)	27.0 (80.6)
Mean daily minimum °C (°F)	11.1 (52.0)	13.6 (56.5)	17.1 (62.8)	20.6 (69.1)	23.5 (74.3)	24.5 (76.1)	23.9 (75.0)	22.9 (73.2)	22.9 (73.2)	21.3 (70.3)	15.6 (60.1)	11.8 (53.2)	19.1 (66.4)
Record low °C (°F)	0.7 (33.3)	1.4 (34.5)	6.5 (43.7)	8.2 (46.8)	12.8 (55.0)	15.7 (60.3)	15.6 (60.1)	13.5 (56.3)	15.0 (59.0)	7.1 (44.8)	5.6 (42.1)	2.0 (35.6)	0.7 (33.3)
Average precipitation mm (inches)	0 (0)	0 (0)	0 (0)	1 (0.0)	6.5 (0.26)	16.4 (0.65)	60.0 (2.36)	102.9 (4.05)	28.9 (1.14)	3.8 (0.15)	0 (0)	0 (0)	219.5 (8.64)
Average precipitation days (≥ 1.0 mm)	0	0	0	0.2	0.8	2.2	6.1	8.8	3.4	0.6	0	0	22
Average relative humidity (%)	24	19	16	17	23	32	47	57	44	28	24	24	30
Mean monthly sunshine hours	306.9	274.4	291.4	282.0	266.6	231.0	213.9	213.9	237.0	285.2	306.0	313.1	3,221.4
Source: NOAA

== Economy ==
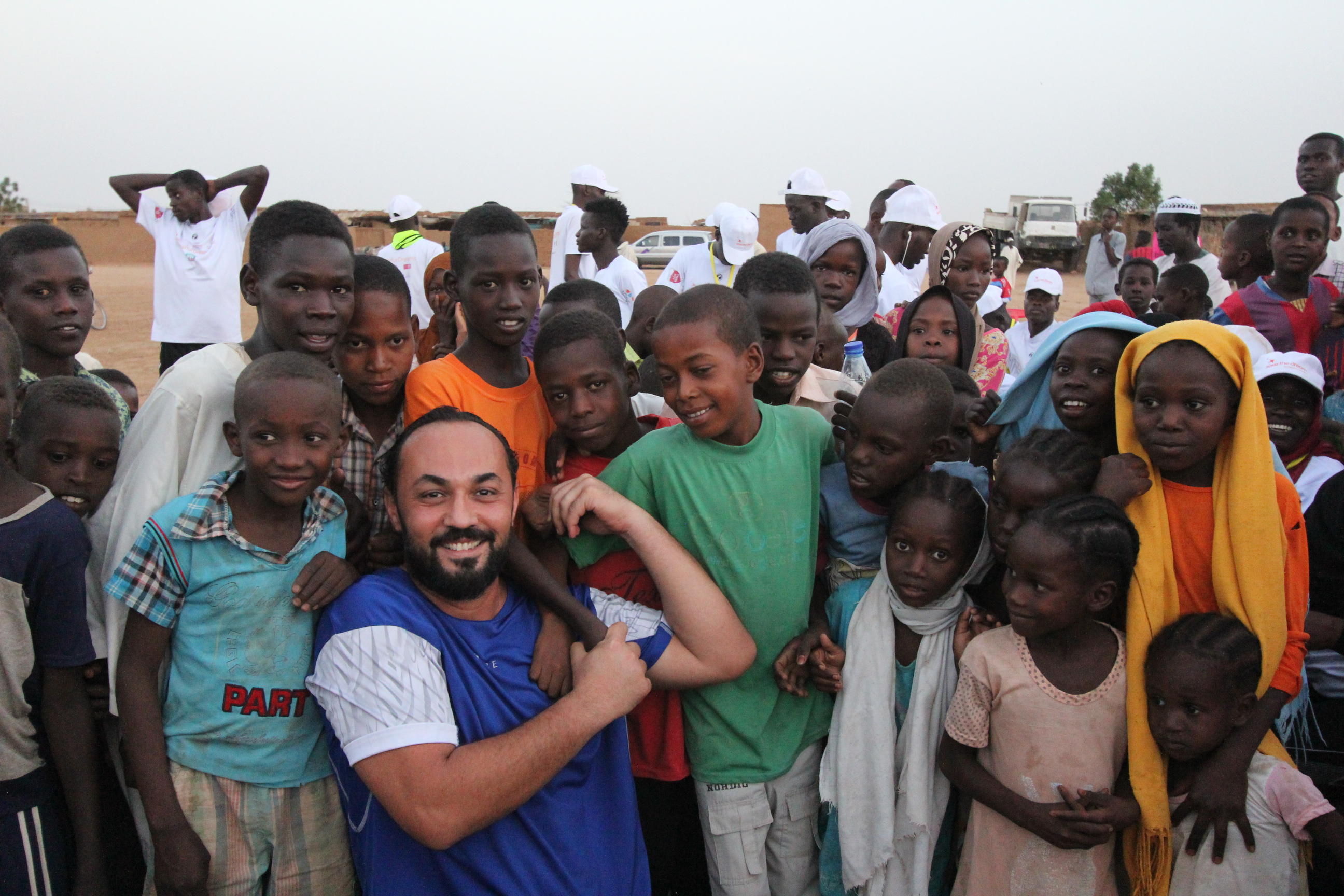
Internally displaced people in El Fasher in 2018

The nearby Abu Shouk and Al Salam internally displaced persons camps had an influx of humanitarian aid from the United Nations as a result of the Darfur crisis, and the city experienced a significant economic and population boom. Rents and retail sales increased, including the selling of bottled water and the opening of a pizza parlour to cater to the demand from Western aid workers. The number of petrol stations has tripled in three years as a result of the increase in the number of cars in the city. Employment opportunities also increased as the United Nations offered jobs to citizens. Economics analyst Adam Ahmed stated that the "people [of El Fasher] are beginning to think in a more business-minded way" to make the most of their situation.

== Demographics ==
El Fasher had 264,734 residents as of 2006, an increase from 2001, when the population was estimated to be 178,500. UN Habitat reported a population of over 500,000 for El Fasher in 2009, attributing the increase to refugees and economic migrants. In 2025, prior to the fall of the city, its population was estimated at 252,000 people.

== Notable residents ==
- Siham Hassan, Sudanese politician and activist, killed during the RSF capture of the city in 2025.
- Mohamed Nureldin Abdallah, Sudanese photojournalist

== See also ==
- Chad—border country near Nyala, Sudan
- Fur people
- Government of Peace and Unity
- History of Darfur
- Zamzam camp
