= Sudan Liberation Movement/Army =

Darfuri rebel group

Sudan Liberation Movement
- Logo of the SLM/A
- Leaders: Minni Minnawi — SLM (Minnawi); Abdul Wahid al Nur — SLM (al-Nur); Khamis Abakar — SLM (Abakar) X; El-Taher Hajar — SLFA; El-Hadi Idris — SLM-TC; Mustafa Tambour — SLM (Tambour)
- Dates active: 2002–present
- Active regions: Western Sudan (mostly Darfur), northern South Sudan, southern Libya
- Size: 600–1,000 men as of 2009 (UN estimate)
- Part of: Sudan Revolutionary Front
- Wars: the Sudanese Civil Wars and other North and East African conflicts
- Website: slmsudan.com and slma.net/en/

Flag of SLM/A – Minnawi

Flag of SLM/A – al-Nur

Flag of SLM/A – Tambour

The Sudan Liberation Movement/Army (Arabic: حركة تحرير السودان Ḥarakat Taḥrīr as-Sūdān; abbreviated SLM, SLA, or SLM/A) is a Sudanese rebel group active in Darfur, Sudan. It was founded as the Darfur Liberation Front by members of three indigenous ethnic groups in Darfur: the Fur, the Zaghawa, and the Masalit, among whom were the leaders Abdul Wahid al-Nur of the Fur, Khamis Abakar of the Masalit and Minni Minnawi of the Zaghawa.

== Formation ==
After a drought in 1984 a small scale conflict called the War of the Tribes sprung up in Darfur. The war was marked by increasing ethnic tension, with Arab ethnic groups forming an Arab supremacist league Tajammu al-Arabi. When General Omar al-Bashir and the National Islamic Front headed by Dr. Hassan al-Turabi overthrew the Sudanese government led by Ahmed al-Mirghani in 1989, a large section of the population in Darfur, particularly the non-Arab ethnicities in the region, became increasingly marginalized. These feelings were solidified in 2000 by the publication of The Black Book, which detailed the structural inequity in the Sudan that denies non-Arabs equal justice and power sharing. In 2002 Abdul Wahid al-Nur, a lawyer, Ahmad Abdel Shafi Bassey, an education student, and a third man founded the Darfur Liberation Front, which subsequently evolved into the Sudan Liberation Movement and claimed to represent all of the oppressed in the Sudan.

== 2008 Sun Air hijacking ==
In August 2008, a local Sun Air Boeing 737 carrying 100 passengers including 5 crew members, was hijacked by members belonging to the Sudan Liberation Movement or SLM. The regional flight operated by the private Sudanese airlines Sun Air was en route from Nyala, South Darfur to Khartoum when it was diverted by the Darfuri rebels to the oasis town of Kufra, in southern Libya. SLM leader Abdel Wahid al-Nur who lived in Paris at the time, denied his involvement in the hijacking and condemned the rebels' use of hijacking to bring attention to their cause. SLA field commander Ibrahim al-Hillo suggested that the Boeing hijackers could be al-Nur sympathizers as the SLA had started to break up at the time of hijacking. The 95 passengers were eventually freed unharmed and the 5 crew members were also released. Al Nur said of the hijacking that Khartoum was attempting to manipulate the hijacking news as a tactic to draw attention away from the government's earlier attack on the Kalma refugee camp which killed 70 civilians. Kalma camp is located near the Nyala airport. The hijackers were detained by Libyan authorities. While the government attack occurred close to the hijacking, it didn't appear to be a motive for the hijacking.

== Libyan involvement ==
Before the overthrow of Muammar Gaddafi during the Libyan Civil War (2011), the Libyan Armed Forces were known to support at least parts of the SLM/A, such as the SLA-Unity. In turn, elements of the SLM/A reportedly became involved in the Second Libyan Civil War, fighting for different factions there in exchange for money and equipment. The SLM/A-Minnawi allied itself with the Khalifa Haftar-aligned Libyan National Army (LNA), and fought alongside it in the Battle of Derna (2018–2019), losing several fighters in the battle. On 12 January 2019, the SLM/A-Minnawi clashed with the Chadian CCMSR rebel group (an enemy of the LNA) at Gatroun in southern Libya. Later that month, the SLM/A was accused by the CCMSR of aiding an LNA offensive in southern Libya.

== Groups and factions ==
=== Sudan Liberation Movement (Minnawi) ===
The SLM (Minnawi) is led by Minni Minnawi and signed the 2006 (Abuja) Darfur Peace Agreement in May 2006. Minnawi served as the Chairman of the Transitional Darfur Regional Authority from its formation in 2007 to his dismissal in December 2010. The SLM-Minnawi faction formally withdrew from the peace agreement in February 2011. Unlike most other SPLM/A factions, the SLA-MM was active not just in Darfur, but also took part in the Sudanese conflict in South Kordofan and Blue Nile. The group has also taken part in the South Sudanese Civil War, fighting for the South Sudanese government against various rebel factions. The SLM-Minnawi was a participant in the 2019 Sudanese peace process as of September 2019. Minnawi was appointed as regional governor of the Darfur Regional Government in August 2021.

=== Sudan Liberation Movement (al-Nur) ===
Map of Sudanese Civil War (2023–present) Controlled by Sudanese Armed Forces and allies Controlled by Rapid Support Forces Controlled by SPLM-N (al-Hilu) Controlled by allied Rapid Support Forces and SPLM-N (al-Hilu) Controlled by SLM (al-Nur)

The SLM (al-Nur) was formed in 2006 and is led by Abdul Wahid al Nur. It rejected the 2006 (Abuja) Darfur Peace Agreement. The SLM/A (al-Nur) does not officially insist on independence. The group includes both male and female fighters. The group has also taken part in the South Sudanese Civil War, fighting for the South Sudanese government against various rebel factions. The SLM/A (al-Nur) maintains its stronghold in the Marrah Mountains as of 2021, holding a territory inhabited by about 300,000 people. The area is effectively self-sufficient and mostly isolated from the rest of Sudan. It runs a de facto government there, training new troops, and has also built several schools, where hundreds of children receive daily education. The SLM/A (al-Nur) rejected the 2019 Sudanese peace process, arguing that Arab militias continued their attacks in Darfur and that the new Sovereignty Council of Sudan included many former commanders from the Bashir Era. However, the group was suffering from internal tensions at this point, as some of its factions were clashing with each other. One splinter group led by Zanoun Abdulshafi had begun to fight alongside the Arab militias. Fighting between the SLM/A (al-Nur) and pro-government forces continues as of 2021.

=== Sudan Liberation Forces Alliance ===
The SLFA was created in July 2017 by joining a faction of the SLM-Unity, Sudan Liberation Movement for Justice, and a faction of the Justice and Equality Movement led by Abdallah Bishr Gali. As of July 2017, the SLFA's chair was El-Taher Abu Bakr Hajar with Abdallah Yahia being the deputy chair. In March 2021, El Taher Hajar was sworn in as a member of Sudan's Transitional Sovereignty Council as part of the implementation of the Juba Peace Agreement.

=== Sudan Liberation Movement-Transitional Council ===
As of March 2019, the SLM-TC was led by El-Hadi Idris Yahya, as a breakaway group from the SLM (al-Nur); the SLM-TC was opposed to negotiations with Sudanese president Omar al-Bashir and participated in the Sudan Call alliance. In March 2021, El-Hadi Idris was sworn as member of Sudan's Transitional Sovereignty Council as part of the implementation of the Juba Peace Agreement. In July 2025, El-Hadi Idris was named as a member of the presidential council of the rival Government of Peace and Unity established to administer areas of Sudan controlled by the Rapid Support Forces (RSF).

=== Sudan Liberation Movement (Tambour) ===
The SLM (Tambour) was formed when Mustafa Tambour split in 2018 from the SLM (al-Nur) led by Abdul Wahid al Nur. On 31 July 2023, the SLM (Tambour) announced that its forces had joined the SAF in fighting against the RSF during the Sudanese civil war that began in 2023, claiming to have inflicted 68 casualties on the latter during fighting in Zalingei. Tambour's brother had previously been killed by the RSF.

=== Other smaller splinter groups ===
- Sudan Liberation Movement (Historic Leadership) – Split from the al-Nur faction and is led by Osman Ibrahim Musa. It signed a peace agreement with the government of South Darfur in January 2011.
- Sudan Liberation Movement (General Command) – Formed in November 2010 by former members of the SLM factions and the former members of the Justice and Equality Movement (JEM). It is led by Adam Ali Shogar.
- Sudan Liberation Movement (Mainstream) – Led by Mohamed Al Zubeir Khamis.
- Sudan Liberation Movement (Unity) – Emerged as multi-tribal alliance of rebel groups from northern Darfur after the Abuja peace talks. Though it has no real political plan, the alliance stresses good relations with the people of Darfur and rejected Minnawi's faction for its attacks on civilians. In general, it is poorly armed and rather weak.
  - SLA-Unity (1) – The main sub-faction, led by several commanders with Abdalla Yahya, Ahmad Kubbur, and Sharif Harir being the most notable. SLA-Unity (1) was weakened by defections to JEM in 2009, but claimed they have recovered from that setback later on.
  - SLA-Unity (2) – A splinter group led by Mahjoub Hussein, a former commander in the Minnawi faction and the leader of the short-lived "Greater Sudan Liberation Movement". Supported by Libya, he claimed to be the new leader of SLA-Unity in 2009, but managed to rally almost none of Unity group's militias to his cause.
- Sudan Liberation Army (Peace Wing) disbanded in 2013.
- SLA-Mother Wing led by Abu Gasim, disbanded in 2013
- Sudan Liberation Movement (Second Revolution) (abbreviated SLM-SR) – Founded as splinter group of SLM/A (al-Nur) in 2014, and is led by Abul Gasim Imam. It takes part in the conflicts of Darfur, South Kordofan, and Blue Nile, and participated in peace talks with the Sudanese government in 2016.
- Sudan Liberation Movement (Free Will) (I) Split from the al-Nur faction around October 2006. Composed mainly of the Birgid tribe from South Darfur and led by Adam Salih.
  - Sudan Liberation Movement (Free Will) (II) Led by Abel Rahman Musa a Tunjur who joined the Abuja Peace Process.
- Sudan Liberation Movement (Peace and Development) (abbreviated SLM-PD) - led by El Sadig El Foka and formed in 2016. The group participated in peace talks and joined the Sudanese Army. Usually referred to as Sudan Liberation Movement - El Foka (SLM-El Foka).
- Sudan Liberation Movement (Classic) split from the al-Nur faction after not agreeing with the Abuja Peace Agreement.
- Sudan Liberation Movement (Koreina, al-Nur, al-Jamil) – Founded in Uganda in August 2025 by Legal Advisor Mahmoud Koreina, Economic Affairs Advisor Adam al-Nur, and Media Advisor Mustafa al-Jamil following their dismissal by Minni Minawi.

== August 2020 peace agreement ==
Minni Minawi signed a peace agreement on behalf of the Sudan Liberation Movement with the Transitional Government of Sudan on 31 August 2020 and the organisation will now participate in the transition to democracy in Sudan through peaceful means. Under the terms of the agreement, the factions that signed will be entitled to three seats on the sovereignty council, a total of five ministers in the transitional cabinet and a quarter of seats in the transitional legislature. At a regional level, signatories will be entitled between 30 and 40% of the seats on transitional legislatures of their home states or regions.

== Sudanese civil war (2023–present) ==
The SLM (al-Nur) zone of control (red) as of 12 November 2026, including Tawila

The SLM (al-Nur) has established a zone-of-control around the town of Tawila after the withdrawal of both government and Rapid Support Forces (RSF) forces in the region. This zone of control also includes several surrounding villages including Martal, Al-Aradib, Al-Ashra, Sortony, and Tibira in North Darfur, Kadner and Kankoro in South Darfur, and Katrom, Sabanga, Barqa, and Rofta in Central Darfur.

On January 22, 2024, the combatants that signed the Juba Peace Agreement met for a summit in Cairo. Namely, Brigadier General Mubarak Bakhit, the Secretary of Presidential Affairs of the Gathering of Sudan Liberation Forces, Suleiman Sandal and Gibril Adam Bilal, Vice Presidents of the Justice and Equality Movement, and Seif al-Din Issa Advisor to the President of the SLM-TC, however, Minni Arko Minawi and his faction of the SLM did not attend. The gathering recommended that the Jeddah Declaration to Cessation of Hostilities be implemented, which outlined the withdrawal of all RSF personnel from Darfur.

On March 24, 2024, Minawi announced that the 1,500 SLM fighters would join the Sudanese Armed Forces in fighting the RSF in order to "defend civilians and Sudan's sovereignty." SLM forces are to progress toward the country's center to expel the RSF from Khartoum and Gezira State.

Between 15 and 16 January 2025, clashes between the RSF and SLA erupted in Kabhabiya, resulting in over 120 killed.

On April 12, 2025, Abdul Wahid Mohammed Ahmed Al Nour issued an urgent appeal to relief agencies for assistance in dealing with a huge influx of refugees from the fighting in Al Fashir into the Tawila and Jebel Marra areas. On November 2, 2025, Al Nour announced a mission to countries of the European Union "to engage in high-level discussions aimed at facilitating the delivery of humanitarian relief and assistance to vulnerable populations affected by the ongoing war across all regions in Sudan."
