= Fur–Arab conflict =

- Part of Second Sudanese Civil War
Date	1987–1989
Location	Darfur, Sudan & Western Chad
Result	ended

Belligerents
Tajammu al-Arabi; Sudan; Supported by: Libya	Fur militias Supported by: Chad

Casualties and losses
- Around 3,000 thousand killed, 400 villages burned

The 1987–1989 Fur–Arab conflict also known as the War of the Tribes was an armed conflict in Darfur, Sudan fought between the Fur tribe and Darfuri Baggara Arab tribe. The fighting started in 1987 over access to grazing land and water sources.

== Background ==
The opposing sides were the mostly agricultural Fur and mostly pastoral Arab who had coexisted in Darfur relatively peacefully for decades. After major droughts and a famine in 1984, clashes between the groups started occurring caused by competition for water and pastures.

The early warning signs for the war was the collapse of economic ties between the Fur and Zaghawa. Before the drought Fur had allowed the Zaghawa herdsmen to enter areas like Jebel Marra to herd livestock on farmlands. In return Fur received some of the animals and the grazing fertilized farmland.

Because of the prolonged droughts and famine in Darfur, Fur farmers started increasingly barring herders from their land to retain their crops. The then established Fur lead Darfur Development Front (DDF) also was gaining attraction inside Darfur. Darfuri Arabs saw the DDF as a threat due to the ethnic background of DDF leaders being Fur. This combined with arms flowing from Libya and Chad lead to the ethnic clashes becoming violent.

== Conflict ==
=== Outbreak of the conflict ===
In 1987 Arab tribal leaders addressed Sudanese president Sadiq al-Mahdi under the auspices of Arab-supremacist group Tajammu al-Arabi. in the address tribal leaders openly advocated the destruction of the regional government and the murder of the Zurga (Derogatory term used for the black Darfurians). The address is considered as the start of the conflict although hostilities had been rampant since the famine.

=== Conflict ===
The conflict was marked by extreme ethnic based violence. Arab militias called Janjaweed conducted numerous raids to Fur villages. In the raids they burned and looted the villages leaving behind hundreds of dead civilians. Historian Sharif Harir alleged that the goal of the Janjaweed was settlement of Fur owned land and expansion of the "Arab belt". The Fur militias responded similar attacks burning Arab herders tents and killing civilians. Fur militias also burned Arab pastures and rustled their livestock to "starve them out". Both communities were saturated by arms. Recent war between the government Hissene Habre and Muammar Gaddafi had flooded the region with weapons. The government of Sudan also funneled weapons captured from the Sudanese People's Liberation Army (SPLA) to Arab groups in Darfur.

=== Peace deal ===
In the end the conflict had killed around 3,000 people of which 2,500 were Fur and 500 were Arab. The attacks destroyed around 400 villages and caused a huge influx of refugees to IDP camps in Darfur and Chad. In May 1989 leaders of the Fur and Arabs met in El-Fasher to negotiate for peace. The negotiations reached a deadlock in June. In July Nation Islamic Front (NIF) overthrew the government of Sadiq al-Mahdi. The coup sped up the negotiations and in 8 July both groups signed a reconciliation agreement which brought the end to the conflict. Under this agreement, the Arab and Furs militias pledged to lay down their arms and disband in a process overseen by the government. The agrmement also lead to the disbanding of Tajammu al-Arabi

== Aftermath ==
NIF stated that one of their key reasons for the coup was "government’s failure to stop the conflict in Darfur". The conflict evolved in to the larger Darfur war which began in 2003. Although Tajammu al-Arabi disbanded in 1989 it is named as a predecessor to the Janjaweed militias which became major in the war in Darfur.
