= Islamic Legion =

Former Libyan paramilitary

Islamic Legion الفيلق الإسلامي
- Dates active: 1972–c. 1987
- Country: Libya; Chad; Sudan; Mali; Niger
- Allegiance: Libya
- Ideology: Arab-Islamic nationalism Arab supremacy
- Status: Defunct

The Islamic Legion (Arabic: الفيلق الإسلامي al-Faylaq ul-'Islāmiyyu; a.k.a. Islamic Pan-African Legion) was a Libyan-sponsored pan-Arabist and pan-Islamist paramilitary force, created in 1972. The Legion was part of Muammar Gaddafi's dream of creating the Great Islamic State of the Sahel.

== Creation ==
Gaddafi, who had come to power in September 1969, was not only a Pan-Africanist, but according to Gérard Prunier an Arab supremacist. His hostility to Chad's government of President François Tombalbaye was at least partly inspired by Tombalbaye's African and Christian background. It also led Gaddafi to drive the Toubou of Libya, who were considered 'black', from Fezzan and across the Chadian border. Gaddafi supported the Sudanese government of Gaafar Nimeiry, referring to it as an "Arab Nationalist Revolutionary Movement", and even offered to merge the two countries at a meeting in late 1971. Gaddafi's plans for the peaceful formation of an "Arab Union" were dashed when Nimeiry turned down his offer and negotiated the Addis Ababa Agreement ending the First Sudanese Civil War, fought with the Black, animist and Christian, South. Gaddafi's definition of "Arab" was broad, including the Tuareg of Mali and Niger, as well as the Zaghawa of Chad and Sudan.

The Islamic Legion was established in May 1972.

The priority of the Legion was first Chad, and then Sudan. In Darfur, a western province of Sudan, Gaddafi supported the creation of the Arab Gathering (Tajammu al-Arabi), which according to Gérard Prunier was "a militantly racist and pan-Arabist organization which stressed the 'Arab' character of the province." The two organizations shared members and a source of support, and the distinction between the two is often ambiguous.

== The Legion ==
This Islamic Legion was mostly composed of immigrants from poorer Sahelian countries. Generally speaking, the Legion's members were immigrants who had gone to Libya with no thought of fighting wars, and had been provided with inadequate military training and had sparse commitment. Alain Frachon, speaking of the Legion's forces in Chad, observed that they were "foreigners, Arabs or Africans, mercenaries in spite of themselves, wretches who had come to Libya hoping for a civilian job, but found themselves signed up more or less by force to go and fight in an unknown desert."

According to the Military Balance published by the International Institute for Strategic Studies, the force was organized into one armored, one infantry, and one paratroop/commando brigade. It had been supplied with T-54 and T-55 tanks, armored personnel carriers, and EE-9 armored cars. The Legion was reported to have been committed during the fighting in Chad in 1980 and was praised by Gaddafi for its success there. However, it was believed that many of the troops who fled the Chadian attacks of March 1987 were members of the Legion.

Gaddafi dispatched legionnaires to Uganda, Palestine, Lebanon and Syria, but the Legion was to be mostly associated with the Chadian–Libyan conflict, where already in 1980 7,000 legionnaires participated to the second battle of N'Djamena, where its fighting record was most noted for its ineptitude. To this force Benin's Marxist regime is said to have provided legionnaires during the 1983 offensive in Chad. At the beginning of the 1987 Libyan offensive into Chad, it maintained a force of 2,000 in Darfur. The nearly continuous cross-border raids that resulted greatly contributed to a separate ethnic conflict within Darfur that killed about 9,000 people between 1985 and 1988.

The Legion was disbanded by Gaddafi following its defeats in Chad in 1987 and the Libyan retreat from that country. But its consequences in this region can still be felt. Some of the Janjaweed leaders were among those said to have been trained in Libya, as many Darfuri followers of the Umma Party were forced in exile in the 1970s and 1980s.

The Legion was also to leave a strong impact on the Tuareg living in Mali and Niger. A series of severe droughts had brought many young Tuareg to migrate to Libya, where a number of them were recruited into the Legion, receiving an indoctrination that told them to reject their hereditary chiefs and to fight those governments that excluded the Tuareg from power. After the disbandment of the Legion, these men were to return to their countries and to play an important role in the Tuareg rebellions that erupted in the two countries in 1989–90.

Immediately prior to the overthrow of the Gaddafi regime, there were media reports that his hard-core of supporters included former members of the Islamic Legion who had been granted Libyan citizenship and remained in the country.

== Aftermath ==
In an effort to realize Gaddafi's vision of a united Arab military force, plans for the creation of an Arab Legion were announced periodically. The goal, according to the Libyan press, would be to assemble an army of 1 million men and women fighters to prepare for the great Arab battle—"the battle of liberating Palestine, of toppling the reactionary regimes, of annihilating the borders, gates, and barriers between the countries of the Arab homeland, and of creating the single Arab Jamahiriya from the ocean to the gulf." In March 1985, it was announced that the National Command of the Revolutionary Forces Command in the Arab Nation had been formed with Gaddafi at its head. A number of smaller radical Arab groups from Lebanon, Tunisia, Sudan, Iraq, the Persian Gulf states, and Jordan were represented at the inaugural meeting. Syrian Baath Party and radical Palestinian factions were also present. Each of these movements was expected to earmark 10 percent of its forces for service under the new command. As of April 1987, there was no information confirming the existence of such a militia.

== See also ==
- Foreign legion (disambiguation)
