= 2023 Guyana Defence Force helicopter crash =

Aviation incident in Guyana

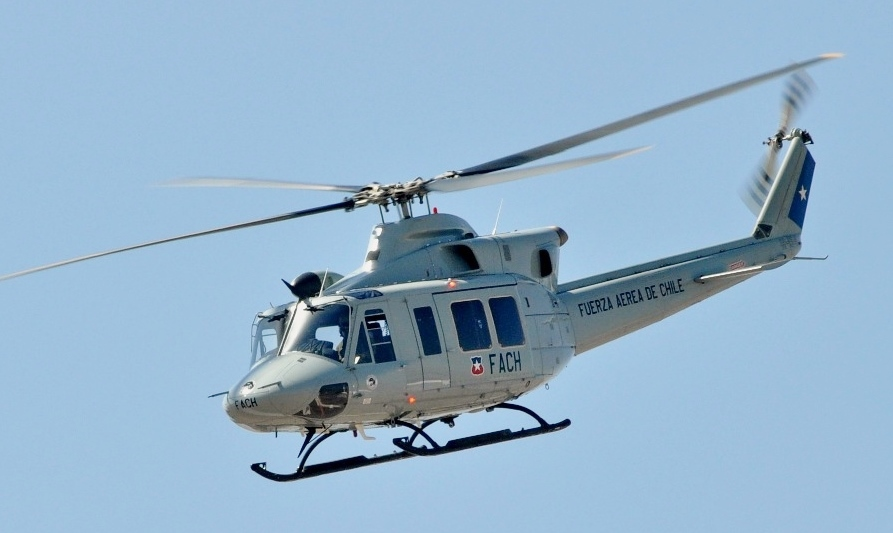
- A Bell 412 similar to the one involved in the incident

Occurrence
- Date: 6 December 2023
- Summary: Crashed, under investigation
- Site: 48 km (30 miles) east of Arau, Guyana

Aircraft
- Aircraft type: Bell 412EP
- Operator: Guyana Defence Force
- Registration: 8R-AYA
- Flight origin: Camp Ayanganna, Georgetown, Guyana
- Destination: Arau, Guyana
- Occupants: 7
- Passengers: 4
- Crew: 3
- Fatalities: 5
- Survivors: 2

On 6 December 2023, a Bell 412EP helicopter operated by the Guyana Defence Force crashed in western Guyana, killing five out of the seven on board. The crash happened about 30 miles east of Arau near the Venezuelan border. The helicopter carried senior GDF military officers, and was reportedly conducting "border operations".

The crash occurred during a political crisis between Guyana and Venezuela regarding the Guyana–Venezuela territorial dispute. The crash marked the deadliest incident in Guyana's recent military history since the Rupununi uprising in 1969.

== Timeline ==
Under the command of Col. Michael Shahoud, Commander of the 1st Infantry Battalion, the helicopter was bound for a military outpost in Arau, situated on the Venezuelan border, to survey GDF defenses in the area, bolstered as a result of the December 2023 Venezuelan Esequiba referendum. The army helicopter was piloted by Lt. Col. Michael Charles, with forty years experience.

The GDF Bell helicopter took off from Camp Ayanganna at 08:00.

At 11:00, the Bell helicopter stopped for refuelling at Olive Creek Airport, located in central Esequiba.

Contact was lost at 11:20, approximately 30 miles east of Arau, near a hamlet of Ekereku, in a mountainous area with dense jungle.

On 7 December, at 14:30, the crashed helicopter was found. Five of the seven on board were found dead, with two survivors; Corporal Dwayne Jackson and Lieutenant Colonel Andio Michael Crawford (Special Forces Squadron).

== Fatalities ==
- Col. Michael Shahoud (Commander, 1st Infantry Battalion)

Shahoud was of Indo-Guyanese descent. In 2018, Shahoud was promoted from Major to Lt. Colonel, as commander of the Guyana Defence Coast Guard. He was promoted to Colonel in February 2023, taking command of the 1st Infantry Battalion, one of three battalions in the GDF. On 17 November, Lt. Col. Shahoud led an induction of new soldiers into the GDF. On 24 November, as commander of the 1st Infantry Battalion, he led a Guyana Defence Force military delegation to meet senior Brazilian military officials, led by Commander of the 1st Jungle Infantry, Maj. Gen. Paulo Santa Barba, in Georgetown as part of the 26th Regional Meeting of Military Exchange between Guyana and Brazil.

- Brig. (Retired) Gary Beaton (Project Engineer, GOG)
- Lt. Col. Michael Charles (Pilot)
- Lt. Col. Sean Welcome (Reserve Battalion)
- Staff Sergeant Jason Khan

== Aftermath ==
Guyanese authorities ruled out a Venezuelan attack, according to Brig. Gen. Omar Khan.

== See also ==
- 2023 Venezuelan referendum regarding the region, held several days before
