= Sudan Federal Democratic Alliance =

The Sudan Federal Democratic Alliance (SFDA) was a small armed group in Sudan, cofounded by a former governor of Darfur, Ahmed Diraige, and Sudanese political activist Sharif Harir. The group was created in London on 5 February 1994 and its main goal was to resist the Khartoum government.

== History ==
The SFDA was created during the Second Sudanese Civil War and its main focus was to create a third front in Darfur to fight the Sudanese government. The groups charter published in January 1994 outlined the objectives of the SFDA. The group objectives were to "create a united, democratic federal Sudan" and "end the al-Bashir regime". The SFDA deviated from other groups in Darfur for being multi-ethnic. Many other groups in Darfur, like the Justice and Equality Movement (JEM) and Sudan Liberation Movement (SLA) were mostly catering to individual ethnic groups, whereas the SFDA was a movement founded by Diraige, an ethnic Fur and Sharif, an ethnic Zaghawa. This made group more of an multi-ethnic one.

The SFDA belonged to the opposition group based in Eritrea by the name of National Democratic Alliance (NDA). The SFDA trained its forces in Western Eritrea near Asmara where the group was also based in. The SFDA was also organizing supporters in Darfur to resist the government of Sudan. Despite this Human Rights Watch reported in 1998 that the SFDA was among "smaller NDA constituents with little or no military capacity"

On 30 June 2006, the SFDA abstained from signing the African Union-mediated peace deal in Abuja and formed a new alliance called the National Redemption Front (NRF). The group consisted of the SFDA, JEM and an holdout faction of the Sudanese Liberation Movement (SLM). The NRF was formed as an opposition to the Abuja agreement.

On 14 July 2007, the SFDA created a rebel umbrella group in Eritrea named the United Front for Liberation & Development (UFLD). The group's members included SLA, Revolutionary Democratic Front Forces (RDFF), National Movement for Reform and Development (NMRD) and the SFDA. The group was created as a "bid to reunite their effort to start peace talks with Sudanese government".
