= Darfur Development Front =

Darfur Development Front (DDF; Arabic: جبهة تنمية دارفور, romanized: Jabhat Nandat Dārfūr) was an regional political movement in Darfur, which was founded in the 1964 and led by Ahmed Diraige. In 1968 the group joined the National Umma Party, but was later revived in 1986 as an autonomous organization. Other prominent members of DDF included Abdul Dosa, and Mohammed Showa, whom were all prominent Darfuris and members of the National Umma party.

DDF was established as a way to advocate for the region's demands of economic development and had an ambition to unite all of Darfurs ethnic groups, but it remained a relatively small movement. DDF was created around the same time as Beja Congress and Nuba Mountains Union. What set DDF apart from these groups was its multiethnic vision and inclusivity of different Darfuri tribes. DDF members mostly consisted of African based ethnic groups, like the Fur, Zaghawa, Masalit, Berti, Mararit and Tunjur. Although DDF was created as an multiethnic organization it received critique for being allegedly "Fur-majority". Sudanese anthropologist Sharif Harir mentioned how, the DDF was “viewed by the majority of Darfurians as representing not a regional base but the Fur.”
