= Nuba Mountains Union =

Defunct political party in Sudan

The Nuba Mountains Union (Arabic: اتحاد جبال النوبا) was a political party in Sudan. It was founded in October 1964. The party was an alliance of tribal and political leaders in the Kordofan province. The formation of the party reflected discontent with traditional parties, and was contemporary with other regional parties in north Sudan like the Beja Congress and the Darfur Development Front. The call to form the party came from Nuba students at the University of Khartoum. The party favoured bifurcation of Kordofan, creating a separate Southern Kordofan (including the Nuba Mountains) region.

The party gathered Muslims, Christians and Animists, although it later suffered a split when Philip Abbas Ghaboush (who had anti-Arab/anti-Muslim orientation) broke away from the party.

In 1965 the party sent a petition to the Sudanese government, calling for economic and social development and the abolition of the Poll Tax in the Nuba Mountains. The party won seven seats in the 1965 election, contesting as independents.

The party contested two seats in the 1968 Constituent Assembly election, and won both. In total the party obtained 3,171 votes (0.17%) of the national vote).
