= MAX 1.2 AC =

Brazilian anti-tank guided missile

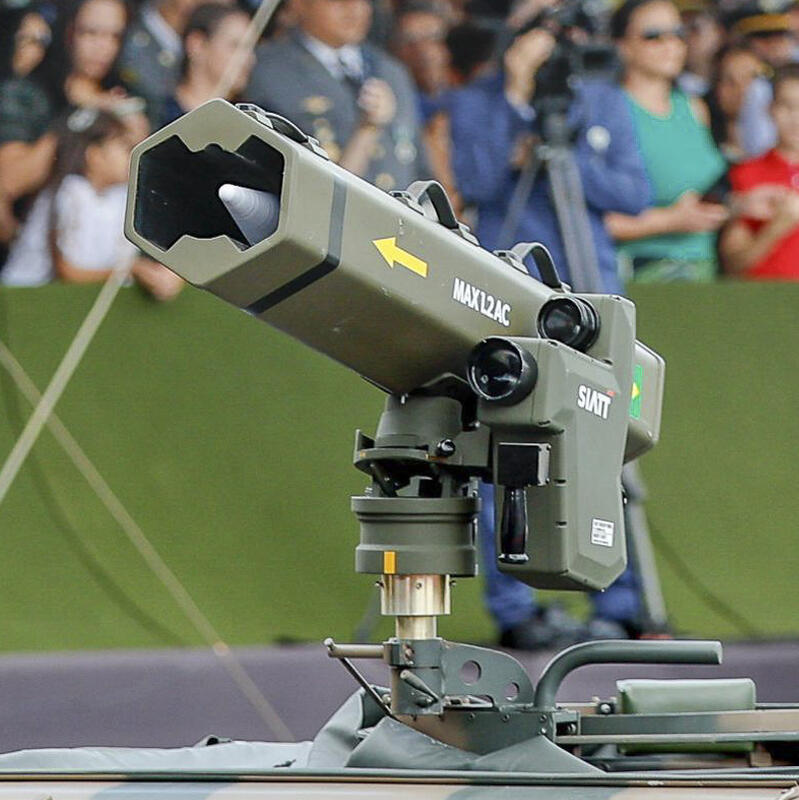
- A vehicle-mounted version of the launcher in 2025
- Type: ATGM
- Place of origin: Brazil

Service history
- Used by: Brazilian Armed Forces

Production history
- Designed: 1980s
- Manufacturer: SIATT

Specifications
- Mass: 15 or 15.2 kg (missile) 24 kg (missile + launch tube); 28 kg (firing unit) 52 kg (total)
- Length: 1.38 or 1.52 m
- Warhead: HMX in a non-tandem shaped charge HEAT warhead (at least 500 mm RHAe penetration, see #Penetration)
- Engine: Two-stage engine
- Propellant: Two-stage solid propellant
- Operational range: At least 2,000 m, see #Range
- Maximum speed: 274 m/s
- Guidance system: Laser-guided semi-automatic command to line of sight
- Launch platform: Two-person infantry crew or vehicle-mounted

The MAX 1.2 AC (previously MSS 1.2 AC) is a Brazilian anti-tank guided missile (ATGM). The system can either be carried by infantry or mounted on vehicles and consists of a reloadable launch tube, laser-guided missile and firing unit, as well as a simulator and testing equipment. It was developed out of Oto Melara's “Missile Anti-Carro della Fanteria” (MAF, Italian: Infantry Anti-Tank Missile), which was rejected by the Italian Army. Brazilian involvement began in 1986 and it has since then been tested and redesigned by the Brazilian Army's research institutes and a series of Brazilian companies (Órbita, Mectron and SIATT).

Development has taken decades, and the anti-tank missile sector, which the MAX 1.2 intends to fill, remained undeveloped within the Brazilian Army. A prototype was approved in 2004 and the first pre-series models were delivered to the Brazilian Army and Brazilian Marine Corps in 2013–2014. The Guyana–Venezuela crisis compelled the Brazilian Army to hasten half of its stock of 50–60 missiles into service in late 2023. The pilot batch was finally homologated in June 2024 and a batch production contract was signed in September. A contract for serial production was signed in February 2025.

== Context ==
The MSS-1.2's development is the Brazilian Army's answer to anti-tank missile technology. Portable anti-tank weapons grew in importance in the 20th century and remain a lucrative market in the 21st. In other countries they are mass-produced and offer lower cost and easier training than armored fighting vehicles, and may be used by light forces to offset their disadvantage against armored forces.

Brazilian military literature recognizes anti-tank defense as a field in need of improvement, which, as of 2023, "lacks deeper study and employment"; "anti-tank capacity generation in Brazilian infantry is incomplete in its cycle of determinant factors: doctrine, organization, training, materiel, education, personnel and infrastructure", and since the 1980s, the Army "is out of sync with the period's global tendency, which has followed the pace of the arms race inherited from the Cold War." Consequently, as of 2019 Brazil "has fallen behind some of its South American neighbors in modern anti-tank defense assets".

As of 2021 the Brazilian Army's anti-tank weapons, the Carl Gustaf 84 mm recoilless rifle and AT-4 launcher, are outranged by tank guns used in other South American countries: 300 meters for the AT-4 and 600-700 meters for the Carl Gustaf, on one hand, and 2,500 meters for the Tanque Argentino Mediano and 4,000 meters for the Leopard 2A4, on the other. An anti-tank missile has greater range and lethality than such weapons. The Brazilian Army has tested missiles with ranges of up to 2,500 meters, and countries such as Chile, Colombia, Ecuador and Peru use missiles with ranges above 4,000 meters, such as the SPIKE LR and TOW 2B. The Argentine Army's TOW2B missiles outrange the Brazilian Army's 105 millimeter Leopard 1 tank guns.

The first attempt to develop an anti-tank missile in Brazil was around 1958, at the Army Technical School (present-day Military Institute of Engineering), but the studies were abandoned in favor of the German Cobra missile. The "Cobra AC" was intensively tested by the Brazilian Army, but did not enter service. Starting from 1995 Brazil acquired the French Eryx and MILAN systems, of which 30 were still in service in 2008. In 2021 the Army acquired ten launchers and 100 missiles of the SPIKE LR2 system. After delays due to the Gaza war, the missiles arrived in 2024, with no sign of further batches. The small batch served merely to maintain capabilities after the MILAN was phased out of service. As of 2024, the Antitank Company Field Manual (EB70-MC-10.334) was still an experimental document.

== Development ==
=== Oto Melara and Engesa ===
One of many West European projects for defense against an armored invasion, the “Missile Anti-Carro della Fanteria” (MAF) began its development in Italy in the 1980s. The project was a private venture by Oto Melara, which left Officine Galileo in charge of guidance, Breda with the firing unit and SNIA-BPD with the engine and warhead. Engesa joined the programme as a co-developer and producer in 1986. In the same year, the Brazilian Army opened a bidding process for a locally-produced, medium-ranged anti-tank missile for its infantry units. The American TOW, Swedish BILL and the MAF were offered. The MAF was chosen in August, which led to an Italo-Brazilian technology transfer.

In January 1987 Engesa transferred this project and two other missiles to the newly-created Órbita Sistemas Aeroespaciais S.A, de São José dos Campos. 40% of its capital came from Engesa, 40% from Embraer and the rest were split between IMBEL, Esca and Parcom. The product was christened MSS-1.2 LEO in homage to Army minister Leônidas Pires Gonçalves. Órbita would have marketing rights in Latin America and the Caribbean. The Brazilian financial contribution to the programme was handled by the Army.

Over twenty missiles were tested until 1990, and the Italian Army opted to purchase the MILAN. Oto Melara and its partners were left with the Brazilian Army as their only client. But the Brazilian arms industry, until then one of the largest in the developing world, collapsed in the 1990s. Órbita never produced missiles, and fell to bankruptcy along with Engesa.

=== Mectron ===
The programme was transferred in October 1991 to the Brazilian Army and newly-created Mectron Engenharia. The Army conducted the project through its Research and Development Institute (Portuguese: Instituto de Pesquisa e Desenvolvimento, IPD) and Army Technological Center (Portuguese: Centro Tecnológico do Exército, CTEx). Mectron was hired to revise and modernize the project and construct the prototypes. Military investment spending decreased in the 1990s, and development was largely suspended. Some development did continue; the first launches took place in this decade. A contract for 40 prototypes was signed in 1996. The 1999 the project's manager reported at the Military Journal of Science and Technology (Portuguese: Revista Militar de Ciência e Tecnologia) on changes made since 1994 and the delivery target for 40 prototypes until August. Launches were made at the Marambaia Testing Range in July. Over time, the project was completely redesigned, leaving little resemblance with the original.

In 2000, the system was predicted to enter operation until 2005. In 2002 the programme was under development for 20 years, counting from the MAF in Italy. In the following year, an International Institute for Strategic Studies journal argued the system would probably never enter production. But the political-economic outlook was now favorable to the industry, and a prototype was approved in 2004 after technical and operational assessments, including 40 launches. Development was deemed to be concluded in 2005, and in 2008 Mectron was authorized to produce a pilot batch of 66 missiles for the Army, which "seemed to put an end to the long novela of the development of the first Brazilian anti-tank missile". The Brazilian Marine Corps requested an undisclosed number of missiles in the following year.

The pilot batch was delivered in 2013–2014 to the Army and marines. A study published by the Applied Economic Research Institute (Portuguese: Instituto de Pesquisas Econômicas Aplicadas, Ipea) concluded the programme was a success and "the country, through Mectron, is qualified to develop, design, produce and assess surface-to-surface anti-tank missiles", which, according to the author, would soon equip infantry and cavalry units. The Ministry of Defense's 2014 management report stated that the "MSS 1.2 missile's development is in its final phase and some parties are interested in the product".

From May to July 2015, CTEx and Mectron technicians made launches in Marambaia, "continuing the preparation for the pilot batch's assessment process". Mectron, which was by then part of Odebrecht Defesa e Tecnologia, signed a contract to "continue assessment tests for the pilot batch". However, test launches in this period revealed several issues, particularly with the laser receptor, and the Army did not certify the product.

=== SIATT ===
With Odebrecht Group in crisis, Mectron employees founded SIATT– Engenharia, Indústria e Comércio, which took over the programme in 2017. Funded by the Studies and Projects Financier (Portuguese: Financiadora de Estudos e Projetos, Finep), they redid the guidance system. Testing resumed in 2018 with Army specialists and achieved good results. The project was "in an operation and technical-operational assessment phase to enable deliveries of pilot batches for the Armed Forces and/or exports". The Brazilian programme had been going on for over 30 years. Field assessments continued in 2022.

In the following year, the missile was nearing production, according to SIATT; technical evaluation of pre-series batches approached its final phase. "Afterwards, an operational assessment will take place, which is predicted to conclude in the first semester of 2024, with the product then being made available to a specific unit before general distribution to operational battalions".

EDGE Group, a conglomerate from the United Arab Emirates, bought 50% of SIATT's capital in September 2023. InfoDefensa magazine described the missile as a "mature product", which is "available for mass production, so long as there's investment in a production line and supplier logistics to answer orders which might even come from the United Arab Emirates Armed Forces". SIATT hadn't yet established serial production and the Brazilian Army hadn't certified its final reports, but it already possessed 50 to 60 missiles and had hired SIATT to update 17 missiles from the pilot batch to its new specifications.

The MSS 1.2 is considered the second version in the system's development history. New versions were in development as of 2024, the MSS 1.3 AC, expected for the following year, and a fourth version for 2027.

== Introduction to service ==
The Brazilian Army anticipated the MSS 1.2's distribution in December 2023 by sending half of its stocks to Roraima, where they equipped the 7th Jungle Infantry Battalion and the newly-created 18th Mechanized Cavalry Regiment. Army General Staff representatives conferenced with SIATT's directors to negotiate a new order of around 200 missiles, which would equip units across the country. These measures were a result of the Guyana–Venezuela crisis and the lack of armaments fit to respond to the Venezuelan Army's T-72 tanks in the event of an intrusion into Brazilian territory. The Russian invasion of Ukraine had made comparable weapons hard to obtain on international markets. The Brazilian Army confirmed the MSS 1.2's presence in Roraima in the following month.

In April 2024 the General Staff began preparations for the Army's 1st Mechanized Antitank Company, to be installed in Pirassununga, São Paulo, and attached to the 11th Mechanized Infantry Brigade. Its planned organization includes four missile platoons with four launchers each, equipped with armored (Iveco Guaicurus) or unarmored (Agrale AM21) vehicles. Its equipment could be either the Spike LR2 or the MSS 1.2, which was in final phases of homologation and adoption. Personnel of the Roraima Border Command/7th Jungle Infantry Battalion, from Boa Vista, 1st Airborne Cavalry Squadron, from Rio de Janeiro, 5th Light Infantry Battalion, from Lorena, and the Marine Corps attended launch tests in June 6.

Test and evaluation report n. 052/24, which covers the MSS pilot batch, was finally homologated by the Army's Science and Technology Department on June 26. Wider adoption by the Army and serial production had yet to begin. SIATT's newly-expanded plant in São José dos Campos was expected to begin production in the near future. On September 26, SIATT and the Science and Technology Department signed a licensing, production and trading contract for the product. The ceremony formalized its new official name, "MAX 1.2 AC", in homage to Brazilian Expeditionary Force hero, sergeant Max Wolff Filho. In the Brazilian Marine Corps, the missile was delivered to infantry battalions in June 2025, replacing the RBS 56 BILL.

== Characteristics ==
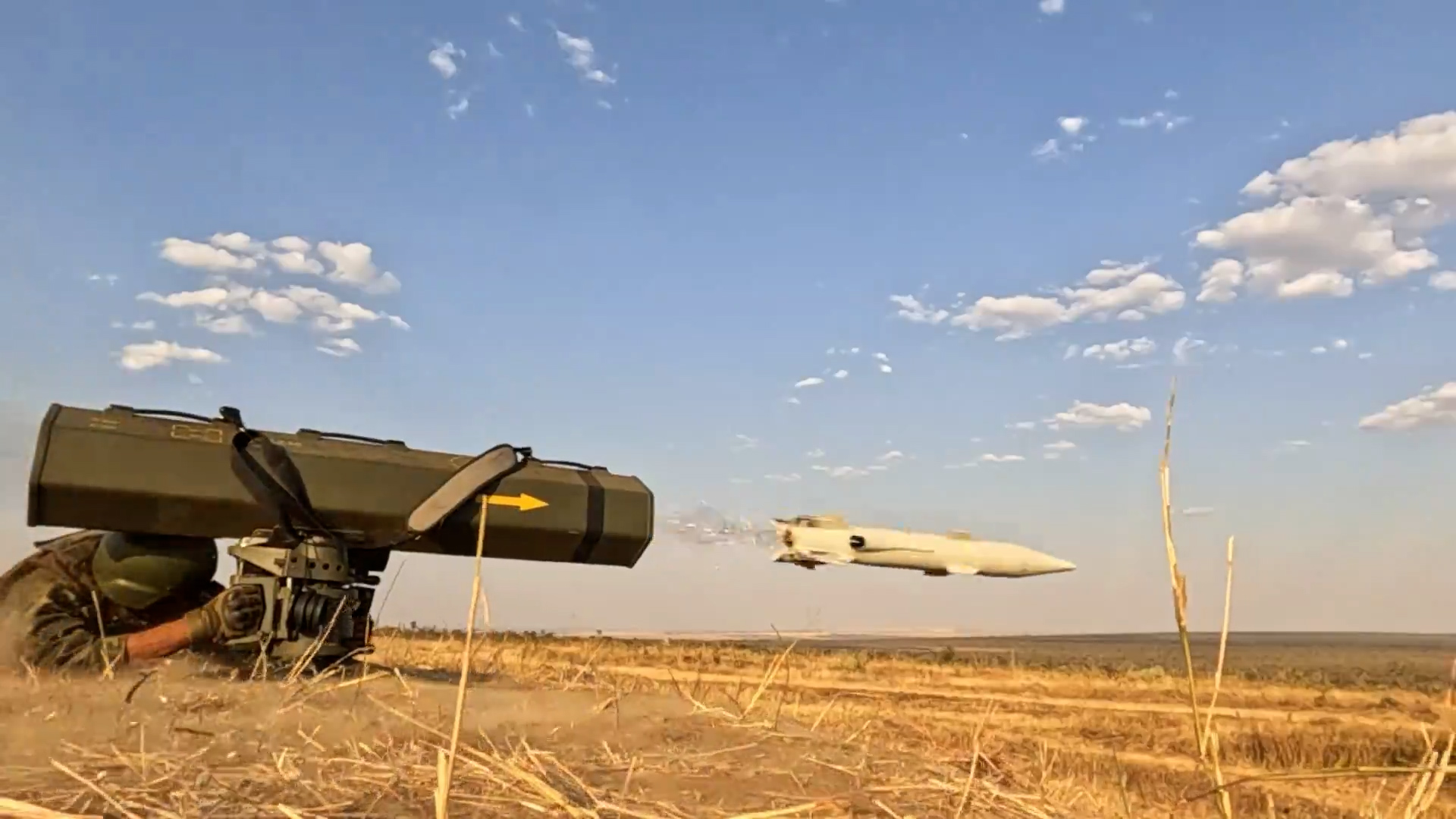
Test firing in a Marine Corps exercise

The MSS 1.2's main role is anti-tank, and it may also be used against casemates, small buildings and hovering helicopters. It consists of two systems, the Support Mode, composed of a simulator and testing equipment, and Employment Mode, composed of the launch tube, missile and firing unit, which is operated by two men, the gunner and loader. The missile and launch tube weigh 24 kg, with the firing unit contributing another 28 kg, for a total of 52 kg. In comparison, the MILAN ADT-ER has a total weight of 34 kg, the Javelin, 22,3 kg, and the TOW-2A, 21,6 kg. (Note: Almeida 2020 also lists the Kornet-E at a weight of 29 kg, with a non-tandem charge and 5,5 km range. But this system's combat weight is 63,7 kg, with a tandem charge and 8 km range, according to Gao, Charlie (2017-12-23). "Russia has a missile to kill NATO tanks if war ever comes". The National Interest.) The launch tube is reloadable.

The MSS 1.2 is transported by ground troops or vehicles, and may be airdropped. In Operation Saci 2020, the Parachute Infantry Brigade used a mockup to represent an anti-tank defensive position. Other possibilities are integration into a Chivunk 4x4 light vehicle, Iveco Guaicurus or EE-9 Cascavel armored reconnaissance vehicle.

The guidance system uses a semi-automatic command to line of sight (SACLOS) method. The operator points the target with a laser beam on which the missile will ride. The missile detects the laser with a sensor in its tail and centers itself on the beam through electrically activated wings. Tail fins stabilize movement. The missile can handle maneuvers with accelerations of up to 5 g. The firing unit has an infrared-sensitive night vision camera.

=== Range ===
The MAF had a minimum range of 70 m and a maximum range of 2,000 m, using an all-weather thermal imager, or 3,000 m with an optical sight in favorable conditions. The MSS 1.2 has a 500 m minimum range. Sources diverge on its maximum range, which is cited as two miles (3,220 m), about 3,000 m, or 2,000 m but reaching 3,000 m in good weather. The Army Technological Center's official page lists a 2,000 m range. Army tests deemed the missile acceptable for targets at a distance of up to 2,000 m, but the range reaches 3,000 m. Mectron representatives stated in 2007 that the Army's requirement was for a 2,000 m range, but targets 3,500 m to 4,000 m away had been hit in tests. As of October 2024, SIATT claims a range "above 2,000 meters".

Compared to alternatives in the market, the 2,000 m range is comparable to the FGM-148 Javelin's (2,000 m) and inferior to the MILAN ADT-ER's (3,000 m) and BGM-71 TOW's (3,750 m). A range extension to 4,000 m was already considered in 2013, and in September 2023 SIATT received funding from Finep for a "beam riding guidance, navigation and control link for a surface-to-surface missile with a range above 4 km".

In 2002 engineer Elizabeth Koslova, in an analysis of the Brazilian missile program, criticized the MSS 1.2's weight/range ratio, blaming it on the laser guidance, which has a large fixed weight. Other missiles with the MSS 1.2's range use wire guidance, which is lighter. Laser-guided missiles typically dilute the fixed weight in other systems to achieve a greater range. The MAF's original Italian project justified its weight by being part of a missile family, one for the infantry and another for helicopters; the infantry version wouldn't be ideal, but it'd save on costs. The Brazilian Army, however, never wanted a helicopter version and its inexperience resulted in an expensive and complex programme to create only the infantry version, which was meant to be just "tolerable" enough to generate demand.

The planned MSS 1.3 aims for a range of three kilometers, and its successor would have four kilometers as well as fire and forget guidance.

=== Penetration ===
Ammunition is of the high-explosive anti-tank type inside a shaped charge warhead. Measured in Rolled Homogeneous Armor equivalency, it penetrates, depending on the source, up to 500, 530, 580 or 800 millimeters. The Army Technological Center's official number is 530 mm. This penetration is small. Although superior to the MILAN ADT-ER's, it is inferior to that of the Javelin (750 mm), Spike ER (800 mm) and TOW (900 mm). These missiles use tandem charges, allowing them to face reactive armor.

In 2021, a paper at the Officer Improvement School (Portuguese: Escola de Aperfeiçoamento de Oficiais, EsAO) compared the MSS 1.2 to other armament options for a hypothetical Anti-tank Squadron in a Mechanized Cavalry Brigade. The Brazilian system was considered inappropriate in its role, although useful for Anti-tank Sections in Mechanized Cavalry Regiments and equivalent units. The producer's experience, caliber (over 105 mm), night vision capacity, two-man crew, adaptability to vehicles, independence from auxiliary material, adaptability to Army doctrine, political convenience and cost were favorable variables within the study's criteria. Penetration in RHAe was deemed neutral as it was in the 400 to 600 mm range. Maximum range, lack of diversity in ammunition, guidance system (which isn't 4th or 5th generation) and absence of service experience were the unfavorable variables to its use.

Future versions planned as of 2024 would raise penetration beyond 1,000 millimeters and improve the missile's effectiveness against reactive armor, according to SIATT.
