= National Redemption Front =

The National Redemption Front (NRF) is an alliance of opposition groups in Darfur, Sudan. According to their foundation declaration, the NRF consists of the Justice and Equality Movement (JEM), a holdout faction of the Sudan Liberation Movement/Army (SLM/A) and the Sudan Federal Democratic Alliance (SFDA). The NRF opposes the Darfur Peace Agreement, signed by the SLA faction led by Minni Minnawi and the Sudanese government on 5 May 2006. The group was formed in late June 2006, after the Abuja Agreement and was led by Ahmed Diraige.

The NRF represents a substantial portion of the opposition forces in Darfur. The African Union, the Sudanese government and other international "partners" in the Darfur Peace Agreement do not recognize their abstention from signing the peace agreement as legitimate.
