= Tajammu al-Arabi =

Sudanese Arab tribal militia

- تجمع العربي
- Dates active: 1987 – 8 July 1989
- Merged into: Janjaweed
- Active regions: Sudan (mainly Darfur); Chad
- Ideology: Baggara's tribal interests Arab supremacy Tribalism; Arab-Islamic nationalism
- Wars: Fur-Arab conflict

Tajammu al-Arabi (Arabic: تجمع العربي, romanized: Tajammuʿ al-ʻArabī), translated into English as Arab Gathering or Arab Alliance, was a Sudanese Arab tribal militia and political organization that operated in western Sudan and eastern Chad in the late 1980s under Libyan sponsorship. The organization was organized by tribal leaders and Islamic Legion militants in the context of the ethno-tribal conflicts that were taking place in Darfur between the Baggara Arabs and the Furs in those years. Although the organization claimed that its aim was solely to represent and defend the interests of Arab tribes, the organization was described by Gérard Prunier as "a militantly racist and pan-Arabist organization which stressed the 'Arab' character of the province." Scholars agree that Tajammu al-Arabi played an important role in the creation of the Janjaweed, which operate in the region to this day.

== History ==
War of the Tribes
- Part of Second Sudanese Civil War
Date	1987–1989
Location	Darfur, Sudan & Western Chad
Result	ended

Belligerents
Tajammu al-Arabi; Sudan; Supported by: Libya	Fur tribes Supported by: Chad

Commanders and leaders
unknown	unknown

Casualties and losses
- Around 3,000 thousand killed, 400 villages burned

Its composition had a background in local tribal militias and in Gaddafi's mercenary forces that operated in the Sahel during the 1970s and 1980s, especially in Chad. Although remote origins of this grouping are uncertain, the organization could have its origins in Libya's Islamic Legion and its missionary da'wa, who were inspired by a racist ideology and reduced the causes of the Sahelian chaos of the 1970s and 1980s to "Arabs versus Africans.”

In 1980 Nimeiry appointed Ahmed Ibrahim Diraige as Governor of Darfur, the first Fur to hold the post since Ali Dinar. During the 1980s, the Furs gained greater representation in local government, occupying most of its posts and institutions, something that displeased Arab Darfurians. Between 1984 and 1985 a horrific famine devastated Darfur, causing more than 100,000 deaths and many more displaced. Famine, drought and the struggle for the region's natural resources sparked peasant revolts and encouraged ethnic conflicts between the nomadic Arab camel herders of Sudan and Chad and the more sedentary native Furs. Interethnic tensions escalated to the point of conflict by 1987. That year a group of Arab tribal leaders from Darfur, using the rubric Tajammu al-Arabi, addressed an open letter to Sadiq al-Mahdi denouncing an underrepresentation in regional government. Despite rising tensions, al-Mahdi ignored Tajammu al-Arabi's demands and appointed Tijani Sese, a Fur, as governor. Tajammu al-Arabi interpreted this as a provocation and in response published a manifesto titled "Quraysh 1". This manifesto, which became the organization's political-military program, openly advocated the destruction of the regional government and the murder of black tribal leaders. The manifesto was published in October 1987 and its signatories included Abdalla Masar, Sharif Ali Jagar, Ibrahim Yagoub, Hesain Hasan Basha, Nazir Hanid Beito, Tajeldin Ahmed Alhilo, Ayoub El Baloula, Mohamed Khawif Alshitali, Zakaria Ibrahim Abu Lehao, Mohamed Zakaria Daldoum, Nazir Alhadi Eisa Dabaka, Altayib Abu Shama, Sindika Dawood, Haroun Ali Sanusi, Dr. Omer Abdel Jabbar, Abdalla Yahia, Sulaiman Jabir Abbaker, Nazir Mohamed Yagoub Alumda, Hamid Mohamed Kheiralla, Mohamed Aldouma Omer, Abdelrahman Ali Abdelnabi, Ahmed Shahata Ahmed, Abubaker Abbo Amin, Jabir Ahmed Alreyyah. The proclamation marked an escalation in the ethnic conflict and is considered to have marked the start of the War of the Tribes.

During this war Musa Hilal, son of Sheikh Hilal Muhammad and a future leader of the Janjaweed, came to prominence. The drought and famine of 1983–84 caused the pastures that the Baggara nomads traditionally grazed to dry up, forcing them to settle on land where no one wanted to work as day laborers in the towns. A young Musa Hilal, as a representative of the Rizayqat tribe, agreed with Gaddafi on a third alternative: Establish training camps for his tribe in Darfur and join the Islamic Legion to fight the jihad in the Sahel against the "enemies of the Arabs and of Islam". After the fall of the Nimeiry regime, Darfur will become the main transit route of Libya for war materiel passing to the fronts and rebels in Chad. Many Baggara fighters who served in the Islamic Legion and who used to cross the Chad–Sudan border returned to their lands with military experience, radicalized and armed to the teeth, ready to face the Furs and the Regional Government.

At the end of May 1989, a peace conference will take place in al-Fashir, chaired by Governor Tijani Sese. The peace process took place throughout the middle of 1989, even in the midst of the 30 June coup. Finally on 8 July 110 Furs representatives, 110 Arabs, and 21 mediators signed a Reconciliation Agreement. Under this agreement, the Arab and Furs militias pledged to lay down their arms and disband in a process overseen by the government, then under a newly created military junta. This meant the dissolution of Tajammu al-Arabi, but not the end of the conflict or the fighting. Many fighters from Tajammu al-Arabi and other militias did not accept the peace process and reorganized as fighters into new paramilitary groups known as janjaweed.

== See also ==
- Janjaweed
- War in Darfur
- Second Sudanese Civil War
