= Guyana–Venezuela crisis (2023–2024) =

Diplomatic crisis in South America

- Part of the Guyana–Venezuela territorial dispute
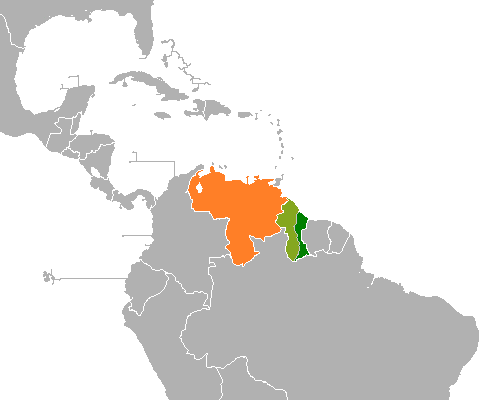
- Area in dispute in light green. Guyana in light and dark green. Venezuela in orange.
- Date: 23 October 2023 – mid 2024
- Location: Essequibo region

Parties
Guyana	Venezuela

Lead figures
Irfaan Ali; Mark Phillips; Omar Khan; Robert Persaud; Hugh Todd; Lula da Silva	Nicolás Maduro; Delcy Rodríguez; Cilia Flores; Diosdado Cabello; Vladimir Padrino López; Jorge Rodríguez; Jorge Arreaza; Yván Gil

Units involved
Guyana Defence Force	National Bolivarian Armed Forces of Venezuela

Casualties and losses
5 killed, 1 helicopter lost (non-combat)	

The long-standing territorial dispute over the Essequibo region escalated into a crisis in 2023. The region is administered by Guyana but is claimed by Venezuela. The dispute dates back many years and the current border was established by the Paris Arbitral Award in 1899. Venezuela renewed its claim in 1962 and the matter was referred to the International Court of Justice (ICJ) in 2018.

Significant oil reserves were discovered offshore in the 2010s, which raised the stakes of the dispute. In September 2023, Guyana granted drilling licenses in the disputed waters. In December 2023, Venezuela held a referendum of its people asking whether the region should become a state of Venezuela and its population become citizens, among other questions. Although the turnout was reported to be low, the Venezuelan government declared that the results showed overwhelming support for such action. Venezuela then took further steps to press its claim such as publishing maps showing the territory annexed to the country and announcing plans to develop the region.

In response to Venezuela's actions, other countries supported Guyana's position including Brazil, the UK and US. Brazil sent troops to its border with the region and the US conducted military exercises with Guyana. The ICJ warned Venezuela not to take any direct action in the region as a trial is scheduled for early 2024 and the Mercosur regional group urged the parties to find a peaceful solution. On 14 December 2023, Ralph Gonsalves, the Prime Minister of Saint Vincent and the Grenadines, hosted a meeting of the leaders of Guyana and Venezuela, as an initiative of the Community of Latin American and Caribbean States, which he currently heads. Officials from the Caribbean Community, Brazil, Colombia and the United Nations also attended. The leaders agreed to not use any force or escalate tension. A joint statement said that both countries will settle the dispute in accordance with international law, despite adding that Venezuela does not recognise the jurisdiction of the ICJ.

In March 2024, Venezuela passed a law that designates Essequibo as a new state of Venezuela, governed from the city of Tumeremo. The law was submitted to the Supreme Court to validate its constitutionality. Sides agreed to participate in further talks in Brazil, however their exact timing is unknown.

== Background ==
=== Dutch colonies ===
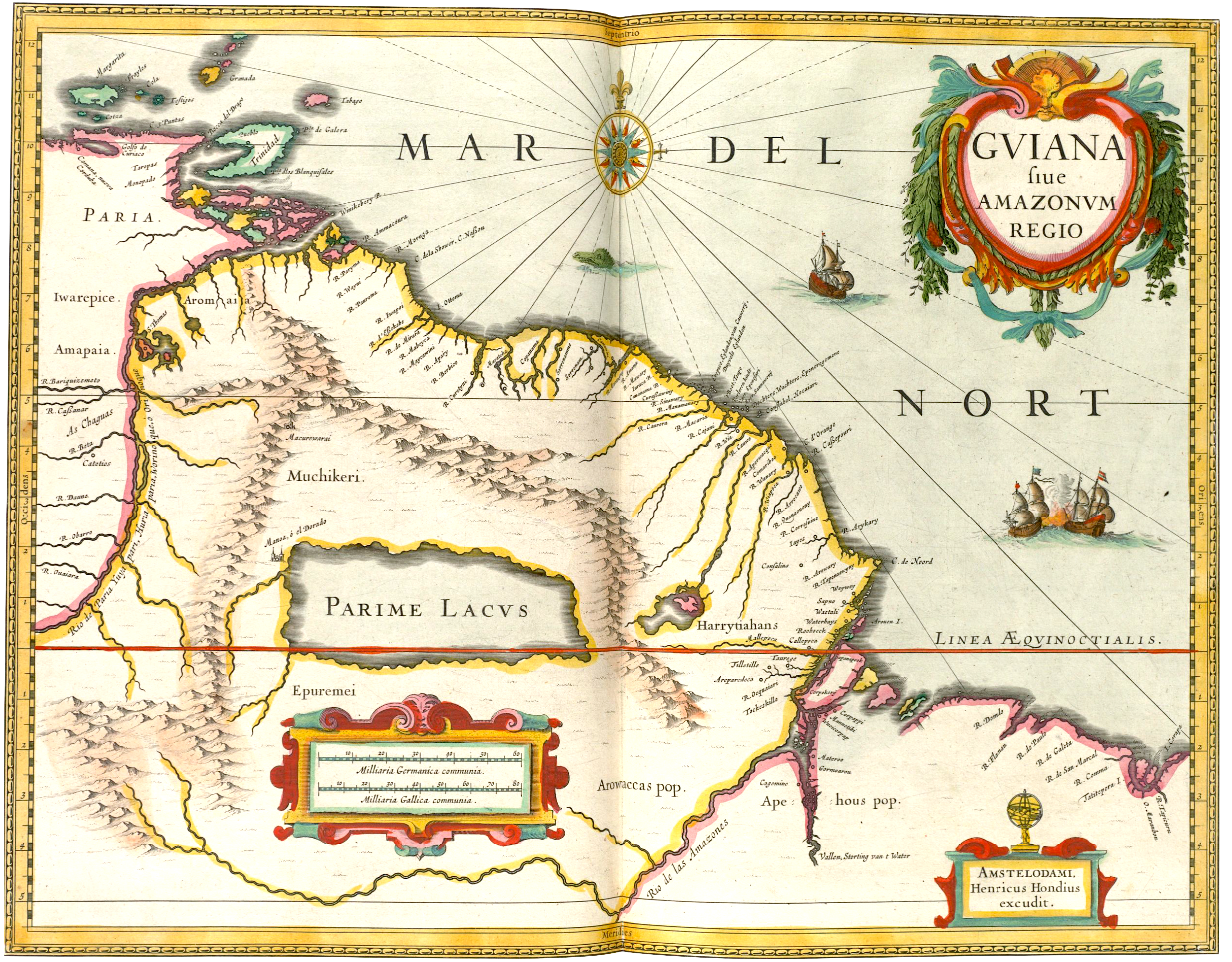
A map of Dutch Guiana by Hendrik Hondius I, 1638

Essequibo started off as a colony of the Dutch and was founded by colonists from the first Zeelandic colony, Pomeroon, conquered in 1581, which had been destroyed by Spaniards and local warriors around 1596. Led by Joost van der Hooge, the Zeelanders travelled to an island called Kyk-Over-Al near the Essequibo River (actually a tributary called the Mazaruni). Dutch colonisation of the Guianas occurred primarily between the mouths of the Orinoco River in the west and the Amazon River to the east. In 1658, cartographer Cornelis Goliath created a map of the colony and made plans to build a city there called "New Middelburg", but the Second Anglo-Dutch War (1665–67) put an end to these plans. Essequibo was occupied by the British in 1665 (along with all other Dutch colonies in the Guianas), and then plundered by the French. The following years the Zeelanders sent a squadron of ships to retake the area. While the Suriname colony was captured from the English by Abraham Crijnssen, the by-then abandoned Essequibo was occupied by Matthys Bergenaar.

After 1745, the number of plantations along the Demerara River and its tributaries rapidly increased, resulting with the Demerara colony. Particularly, British colonists from Barbados began settling here. After 1750 a commander of the British population was assigned, giving them their own representation. Around 1780 a small central settlement was established at the mouth of the Demerara River, which received the name Stabroek in 1784, named after one of the directors of the West Indian Company. A group of British privateers captured Essequibo and Demerara on 24 February 1781, but did not stay. In March, two sloops of a Royal Navy squadron under Admiral Lord Rodney accepted the surrender of "Colony of Demarary and the River Essequebo". From 27 February 1782 to February 1783 the French occupied the colony after compelling Governor Robert Kinston to surrender. The peace of Paris, which occurred in 1783, restored these territories to the Dutch.

=== British Guiana ===
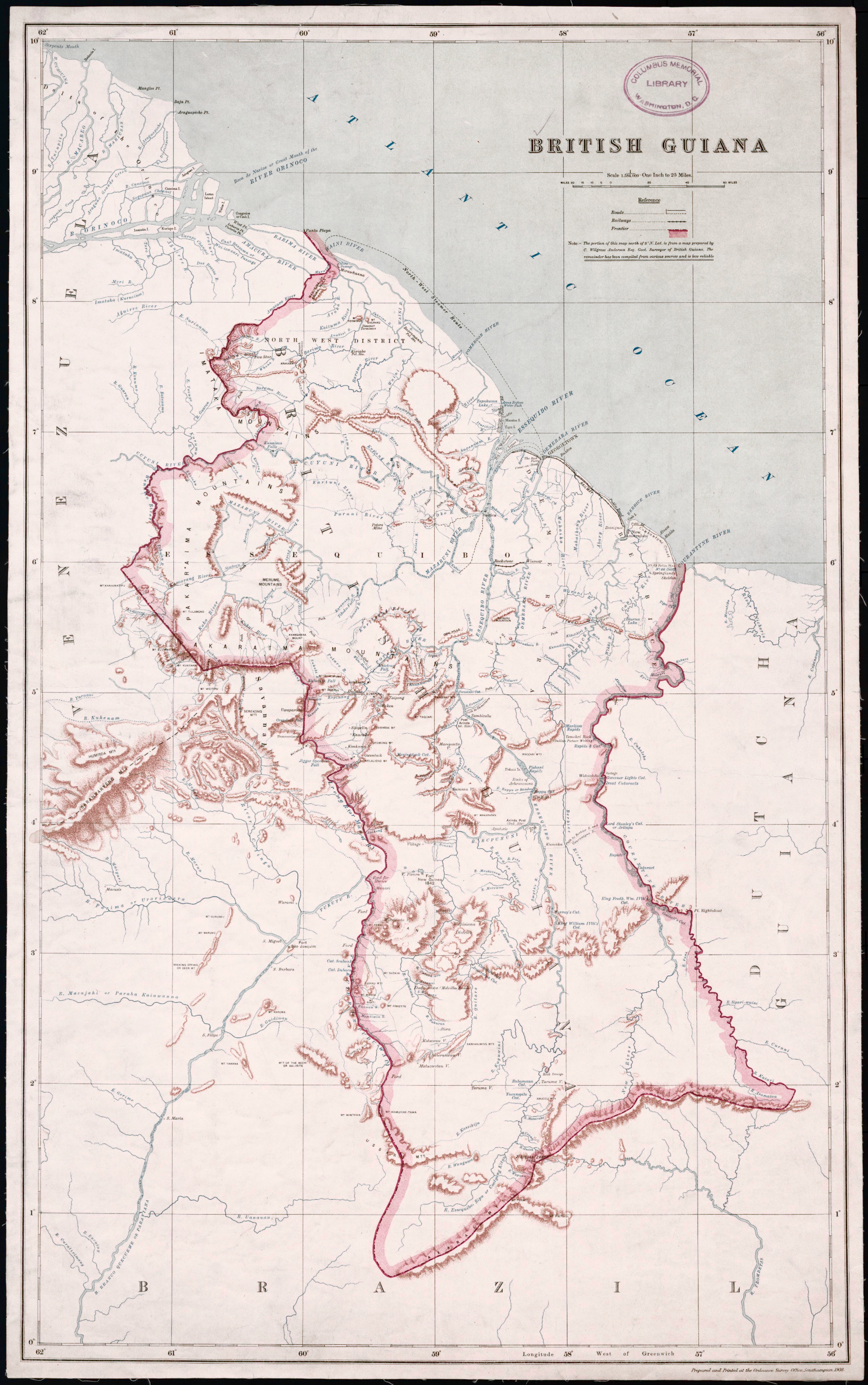
Map of British Guiana in 1908

In 1796, the Essequibo was permanently occupied by the British and by 1800, Essequibo and Demerara collectively held around 380 sugarcane plantations. But it also became involved in one of Latin America's most persistent border disputes because the new colony had the Essequibo river as its west border with the Spanish Captaincy General of Venezuela. Although Spain still claimed the region, the Spanish did not contest the treaty because they were preoccupied with their own colonies' struggles for independence. In 1822, independence leader Simón Bolívar ordered his representative in London, José Rafael Revenga, to present an official complaint to the British authorities, writing: "The settlers of Demerara and Berbice have usurped a large portion of land that according to the last treaties between Spain and Holland belong to us on this side of the Essequibo River. [...] that said colonists place themselves under the jurisdiction and obedience of our laws or withdraw to their former possessions". After Venezuela obtained its independence in 1830, it defined its borders as those that made up the former Captaincy General of Venezuela, which included the Essequibo region. On 21 July 1831, Demerara-Essequibo was united with Berbice to create British Guiana.

Under the aegis of the Royal Geographical Society, the German-born explorer and naturalist Robert Hermann Schomburgk conducted botanical and geographical exploration of British Guiana in 1835. This resulted in a sketch of the territory with a line marking what he believed to be the western boundary claimed by the Dutch. As a result of this, he was commissioned in 1840 by the British government to survey Guiana's boundaries. This survey resulted in what came to be known as the "Schomburgk Line". The line went well beyond the area of British occupation and gave British Guiana control of the mouth of the Orinoco River. Schomburgk's initial sketch, which had been published in 1840, was the only version of the "Schomburgk Line" published until 1886, which led to later accusations by US President Grover Cleveland that the line had been extended "in some mysterious way".

In 1850, Britain and Venezuela reached an agreement whereby they accepted not to colonise the disputed territory, although it was not established where this territory began and ended. The dispute went unmentioned for many years until gold was discovered in the region, which disrupted relations between the United Kingdom and Venezuela. In 1876, gold mines inhabited mainly by English-speaking people had been established in the Cuyuni basin, which was Venezuelan territory beyond the Schomburgk line but within the area Schomburgk thought Britain could claim. That year, Venezuela reiterated its claim up to the Essequibo River, to which the British responded with a counterclaim including the entire Cuyuni basin, although this was a paper claim the British never intended to pursue.

In October 1886 Britain declared the Schomburgk Line to be the provisional frontier of British Guiana, and in February 1887 Venezuela severed diplomatic relations. In 1894, Venezuela appealed to the United States to intervene, citing the Monroe Doctrine as justification. The United States did not want to get involved, only going as far as suggesting the possibility of arbitration.

During the Venezuelan crisis of 1895, the United Kingdom and Venezuela attempted to settle the territorial dispute. Venezuela argued that Spain—whose territory they had acquired—controlled land from the Orinoco River to the Amazon River in present-day Brazil. Spain, according to Venezuela, only designated its claimed Guiana territory to the Dutch, which did not include much land within the disputed territory. Meanwhile, Britain, who had acquired the Dutch territory, stated that the disputed Guiana region was not Spanish because it was so remote and uncontrolled, explaining that the original natives in the land had shared the territory's land with the Dutch instead of the Spanish and were thus under Dutch and British influence. On 3 October 1899 the tribunal ruled largely in favour of Britain. The Schomburgk Line was, with two deviations, established as the border between British Guiana and Venezuela. One deviation was that Venezuela received Barima Point at the mouth of the Orinoco, giving it undisputed control of the river, and thus the ability to levy duties on Venezuelan commerce. The second placed the border at the Wenamu River rather than the Cuyuní River, giving Venezuela substantial territory east of the line. However, Britain received most of the disputed territory, and all of the gold mines.

In 1949, the US jurist Otto Schoenrich gave the Venezuelan government a memorandum written by Mallet-Prevost, which was written in 1944 to be published only after his death. Mallet-Prevost surmised from the private behaviour of the judges that there had been a political deal between Russia and Britain, and said that the Russian chair of the panel, Friedrich Martens, had visited Britain with the two British arbitrators in the summer of 1899, and subsequently had offered the two American judges a choice between accepting a unanimous award along the lines ultimately agreed, or a 3-to-2 majority opinion even more favourable to the British. The alternative would have followed the Schomburgk Line entirely, and given the mouth of the Orinoco to the British. Mallet-Prevost said that the American judges and Venezuelan counsel were disgusted at the situation and considered the 3-to-2 option with a strongly worded minority opinion, but ultimately went along with Martens to avoid depriving Venezuela of even more territory. Said memorandum led to complaints by Venezuela in the United Nations in 1962.

=== Guyana ===
Venezuela signed the Geneva Agreement in 1966 with the United Kingdom prior to the independence of Guyana, which occurred that same year, which established bases for a negotiated solution to the territorial dispute. Five months after Guyana's independence, Venezuelan troops began their occupation of Ankoko island and surrounding islands in October 1966 with Venezuelan troops quickly constructing military installations and an airstrip. In 1969, the Rupununi uprising occurred in an attempt by ranch owners to secede from Guyana.

By 1970, after the expiry of the Mixed Commission established according to the 1966 Geneva Agreement, Presidents Rafael Caldera and Forbes Burnham signed the Port of Spain Protocol, which declared a 12-year moratorium on Venezuela's reclamation of the Essequibo, with the purpose of allowing both governments to promote cooperation and understanding while the border claim was in abeyance. In 1983, the deadline of the Port of Spain Protocol expired, and the Venezuelan President Luis Herrera Campins decided not to extend it anymore and resume the effective claim over the territory.

Into the 21st century, Venezuelan President Hugo Chávez eased border tensions with Guyana under advice of his mentor Fidel Castro and in 2004, Chávez said during a visit in Georgetown, Guyana, that he considered the dispute to be finished. In response to Chávez's nationalisation of oil assets primarily belonging to ExxonMobil, it spearheaded efforts to find oil in neighbouring Guyana in the 2000s. ExxonMobil has been involved in multiple disputes with Venezuela over such assets, with US analyst Steve LeVine considering it was very litigious and "sending a signal" to others considering interfering with their contracts, with multiple defeated attempts at arbitration over sixteen years, the latest submitted on 27 November 2023.

==== Guyana discovers oil deposits ====
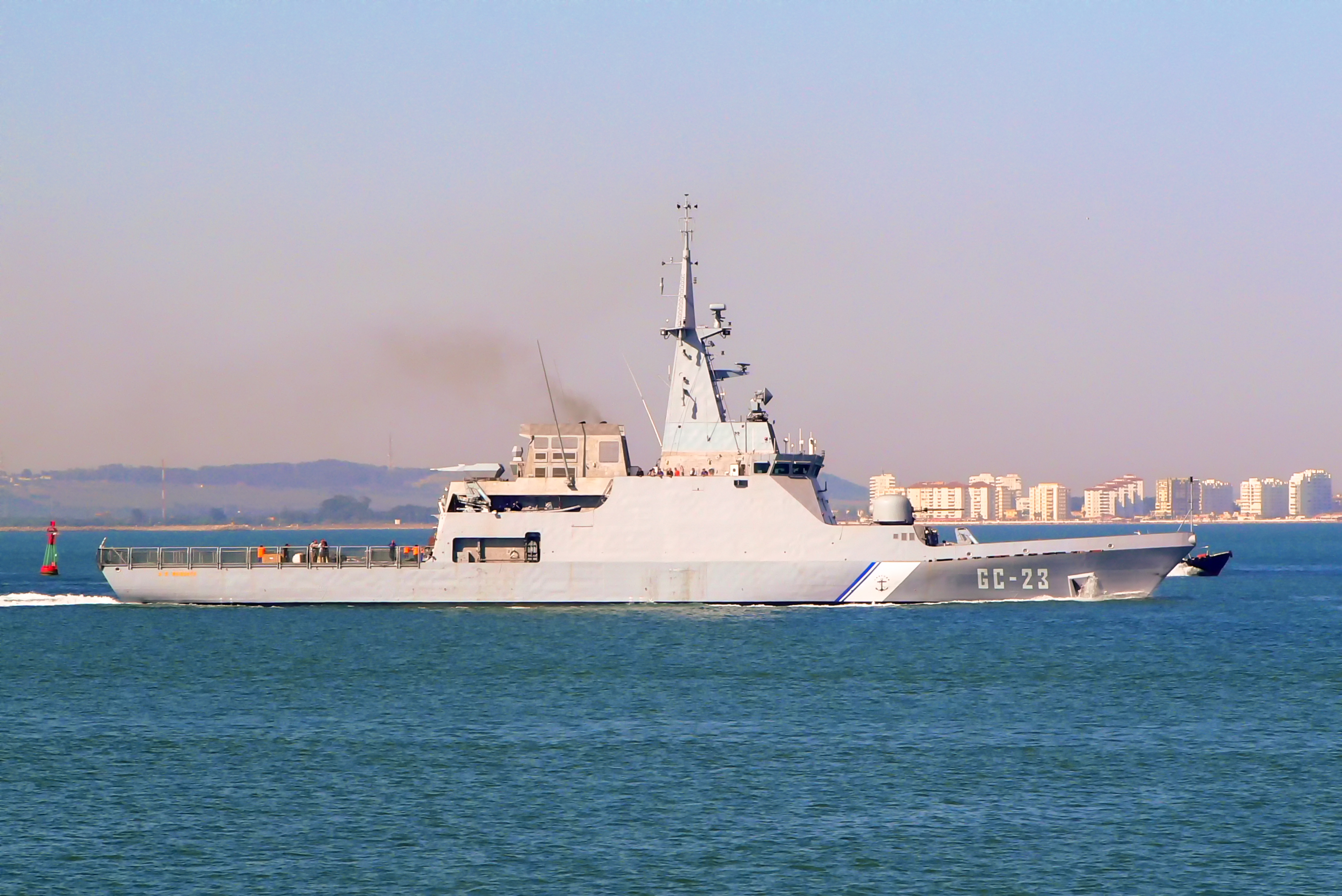
Venezuelan Guaicamacuto-class patrol boat similar to the Commandante Hugo Chavez, which captured Guyanese ships in January 2021

Guyana has granted concessions to the multinational oil corporation ExxonMobil in their exclusive economic zone

Venezuela became more aggressive towards Guyana during the administration of Venezuelan president Nicolás Maduro. The Venezuelan Navy detained an oil exploration vessel conducting seafloor surveys on behalf of the government of Guyana on 10 October 2013, with the ship and its crew being escorted to the Venezuelan Margarita Island to be prosecuted. The Guyanese Ministry of Foreign Affairs said the vessel was in Guyanese waters, but its Venezuelan counterpart sent a diplomatic note to Guyana stating that the ship was conducting oil research in Venezuelan waters with no authorisation from the country, and demanded an explanation. Maduro visited Guyana and discussed the dispute. In Georgetown, Maduro affirmed that the Geneva Agreement was signed by "an old Acción Democrática government and the old British Empire" as part of a "psyop, through contempt and racism, to invade Guyana".

Guyana handed new oil concessions to ExxonMobil in 2014, whose Venezuelan assets Chávez had nationalised seven years prior. In 2015, Venezuela accused ExxonMobil of breaching international law while drilling for oil in Guyana, and a minor crisis broke out wherein Guyanese authorities seized the Venezuelan vessel Yakuana, in Guyana's territorial waters, with both parts demanding an explanation for the other; they later agreed to meet to try to improve delimitation of each other's territorial waters. Maduro announced in 2015 that he would take the dispute to the International Court of Justice (ICJ), and in 2018 Guyana initiated an arbitration proceeding against Venezuela to decide the validity of the 1899 Paris Award.

Between 2015 and 2021, the Center for Strategic and International Studies wrote that about 8 billion barrels of oil reserves were discovered in Guyana, with Guyana becoming among the top twenty countries by proven oil reserves. By 2023, BBC News reported that Guyana had discovered 11 billion barrels worth of oil reserves. Guyanese Natural Resources Minister Rafael Trotman admitted that ExxonMobil had financially backed Guyana for legal disputes, in addition to a "non-disclosed signing bonus" paid by ExxonMobil according to then president David Granger. ExxonMobil Country Manager, Rod Henson, said the payments were customary and usual for petroleum agreements. Guyanese experts noted the government had ignored environmental concerns and that ExxonMobil had no oversight and its executives were frequently seen with top officials, with ExxonMobil having embarked on a public relations and regulatory capture campaign.

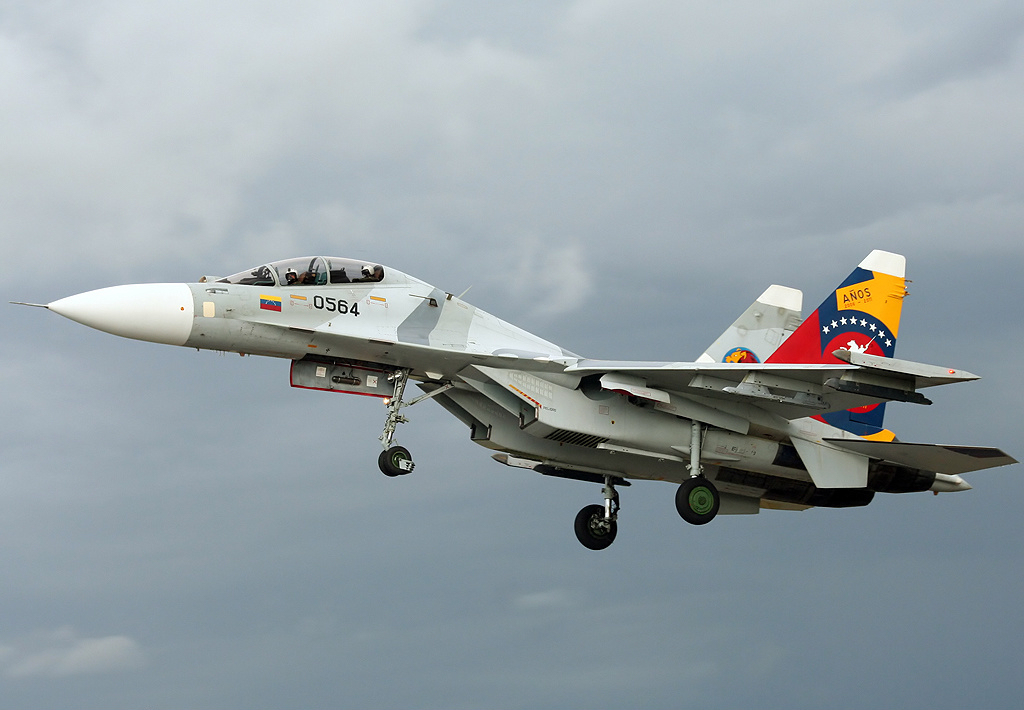
A Venezuelan Sukhoi Su-30, similar to the two fighter jets that entered Guyanese airspace in March 2021

On 7 January 2021, President Maduro issued Decree No. 4,415, claiming 200 nautical miles of seabed from the Orinoco Delta for Venezuela, extending into where Guyana made oil discoveries. Days later on 21 January, the Guaicamacuto-class patrol boat Commandante Hugo Chavez captured two Guyanese fishing boats within the EEZ of Guyana. Months later on 2 March 2021, two Sukhoi Su-30 fighter jets of the Venezuelan Air Force made low passes at 1,500 feet (460 m) over the Guyanese town of Eteringbang. Guyanese Foreign Minister Hugh Todd responded to the incident a day later, stating "the incursion of our territory of the two Venezuelan fighter jets is a clear indication that the government of Venezuela is prepared to use aggression and intimidation to accomplish what cannot be accomplished by legal means: the surrender by Guyana of its patrimony."

In April 2023, the ICJ ruled that it has jurisdiction over the dispute in a lawsuit filed by Guyana in 2018 to determine which nation controlled the disputed territory. Following further discoveries of oil and gas fields, on 19 September 2023, Guyana authorised six foreign oil companies including ExxonMobil to drill in the waters claimed by Venezuela. In October, ExxonMobil Guyana Limited (EMGL) President, Alistair Routledge, told reporters that "we have not been scared away by Venezuela…that's why we're still working in Guyana. That's why we anticipate continuing to do so for decades to come". Guyana also criticised Venezuela for rejecting the ICJ's prerogative to rule on the matter after it rejected their proposal of establishing direct talks instead.

== Timeline of events ==
=== Venezuela announces referendum ===
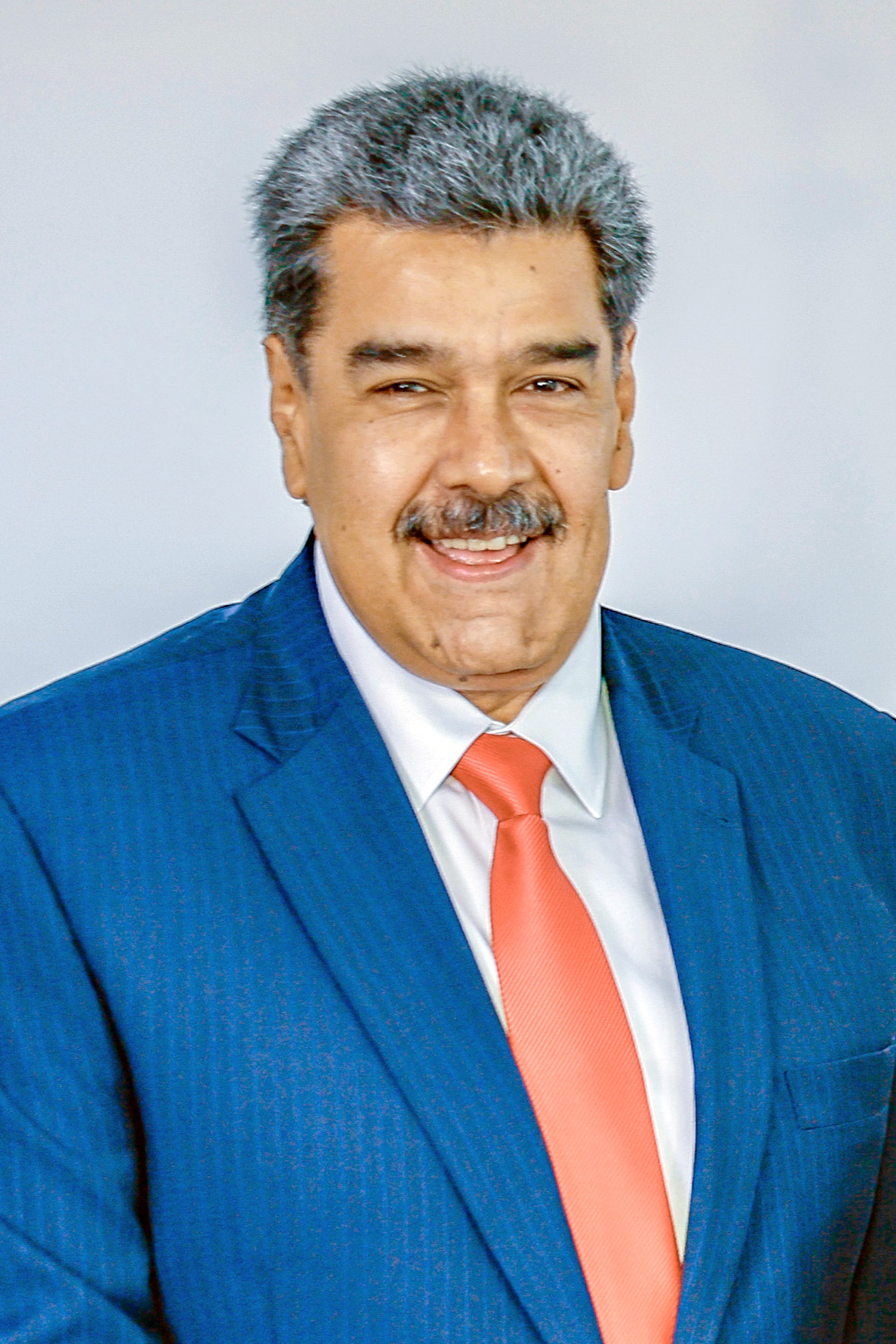
Nicolás Maduro, the main proponent of the 2023 Venezuelan referendum

On 23 October 2023, the National Electoral Council approved several issues, and the Constitutional Council of the Supreme Court of Justice officially confirmed it on 1 November 2023. The government of Nicolás Maduro promoted a consultative referendum in Venezuela for 3 December 2023 in which five questions were asked of citizens, among them, whether they agree to "oppose, by all means, in accordance with the law, Guyana's claim to unilaterally dispose of a sea pending delimitation, illegally and in violation of international law" and whether they would be in favour of giving Venezuelan nationality to the 125,000 inhabitants of the Essequibo. The government has criticised the "abuses of ExxonMobil" and the United States Southern Command, deploying a media campaign that has appealed to Venezuelan patriotism.

Opposition leaders provided different responses to the referendum. Presidential candidate for the opposition political coalition María Corina Machado assured that sovereignty was not consulted, but rather exercised, and asked to suspend the referendum to form a national team with the purpose of filing a claim with the ICJ, while Manuel Rosales and Henrique Capriles, both former opposition presidential candidates, were in favour. Rosales called on Venezuelans to vote in the referendum, and Capriles announced that he would participate in the referendum. The referendum caused a diplomatic crisis between both nations.

=== Reported military buildup ===
In October 2023, it was reported that the Venezuelan military was building a runway near the border with Guyana's Essequibo "to develop" the region. Guyana's president Irfaan Ali responded by saying the country will not give up "an inch" of the region. Guyana asked for Venezuela to explain their troop buildup in the border, and the Venezuelan ambassador Carlos Amador Pérez Silva said that the troops were mobilised to curb illegal mining in the region.

In the context of increasing tensions between the two countries, Guyana's main opposition party, Alliance for Change, called on 4 November for a ban on Venezuelans with Guyanese citizenship from voting in elections, as well as not granting citizenship to more people from the neighbouring country.

Representatives of both Venezuela and Guyana asked in a hearing held at the ICJ in mid-November 2023 that the Court recognise their sovereignty over the Essequibo. Guyana also requested that the referendum be repealed, alleging that Venezuela intended to annex the territory, a request that the Venezuelan government rejected. Guyanese Prime Minister Mark Anthony Phillips took the case to the Organization of American States (OAS) where he accused Venezuela of a military buildup near the Essequibo border, and warned of the consequences of it for Guyana's sovereignty. OAS Secretary General Luis Almagro, the Caribbean Community (CARICOM) and the United States government expressed their support for Guyana.

On 23 November, senior military officers from the Guyana Defence Force and the Brazilian Armed Forces met for a military exchange. Brazil has been a strong supporter of Guyana in the border dispute.

Brazil is currently trying to establish mediation between both countries to avoid an armed conflict. Two teams from the United States Department of Defense were scheduled to visit Guyana in late November. Guyana proposed establishing foreign military bases in its country. The Brazilian Army mobilised towards the border of both countries anticipating a possible Venezuelan invasion. Reports from Brazilian intelligence in early December suggested an imminent military move by the Venezuelan Army against Guyana in the coming days, raising concerns about regional stability and territorial disputes in South America.

The Brazilian foreign ministry, Itamaraty, held a summit between foreign and defence ministers of South American countries on 22 November, wherein Venezuelan foreign minister Félix Osorio claimed Venezuela "may be forced by the people to take measures" On the same day, Brazil sent special envoy Celso Amorim to Caracas, wherein he talked directly with Maduro, who told him there would be no war, but the Brazilian government remained worried, and Amorim warned that the situation could "spiral out of control". Amorim stated Brazil would "not accept any solution that is not peaceful".

On 30 November, Brazilian Minister of Defence José Múcio announced that the Brazilian Army would send 60 troops to Pacaraima to reinforce security at the border crossing with Venezuela, seeking to impede a potential Venezuelan crossing into Guyana from Brazilian territory.

On 1 December, the International Court of Justice ordered Venezuela to refrain from taking action to change the status quo in the border dispute with Guyana. "The court observes that the situation that currently prevails in the territory in dispute is that Guyana administers and exercises control over that area," presiding judge Joan Donoghue said. "Venezuela must refrain from taking any action which would modify that situation," she added. On 4 December, Brazilian defence portal Defesa Net published an article detailing that an anonymous source from a Guyanaese officer claimed roughly 200 Venezuelan special forces had entered Guyanese territory disguised as civilians in order to conduct sabotage and other preparation operations.

On 6 December, Venezuelan Foreign Affairs Minister Yván Gil and Guyana Minister of Foreign Affairs and International Cooperation Hugh Todd had a phone call, at Guyana's request, and the countries agreed to "keep communication channels open", according to Venezuela's government.

=== Raising of the Guyanese and Venezuelan flags ===
At the end of November 2023, the President of Guyana, Irfaan Ali, met with soldiers who guard the border between both countries. In a video released by the government Ali raised the Guyanese flag at an event on the Pakarampa mountain in the Essequibo, near Venezuela's Bolívar state, where he also took an oath of national loyalty. After these acts, the Minister of Defence of Venezuela, Vladímir Padrino López declared that the Venezuelan Armed Forces will be "permanently vigilant" of "any action that threatens" the "territorial integrity", asking the population to vote in the referendum and adding that the conflict "for now" is not a war. The governor of Zulia, Manuel Rosales, claimed that "Guayana Esequiba is one hundred percent Venezuelan territory," arguing that Guyana's actions violated the 1966 Geneva agreement, and criticised the fact that the UN and the OAS did not speak out on the matter.

Afterwards, Venezuelan government officials released a video where local indigenous people exchanged a Guyanese flag for a Venezuelan one. President Irfaan Ali assured that such replacement did not take place. In December, through geolocation, the investigative journalism group Bellingcat determined that the video was recorded near Santa Elena de Uairén, in the Venezuelan state of Bolívar and 185 kilometers from where Guyana raised its flag, and not in the Essequibo territory as originally claimed. The Venezuelan fact-checking group Cazadores de Fake News reached the same conclusion in its own investigation, confirming with four sources in the area that the video was not recorded in the disputed area.

=== Referendum ===
On 3 December, the Venezuelan government organised a referendum asking to support its position in the dispute. The National Electoral Council initially reported that Venezuelans voted "yes" more than 95% of the time on each of the five questions on the ballot. International analysts and media reported that turnout had been remarkably low and that the Venezuelan government had falsified the results. Analysts also noted that the government could use the referendum to mobilise its popular support and neutralise the opposition primaries success, as well as the growing popularity of its candidate María Corina Machado. Bharrat Jagdeo, vice president of Guyana, said in an interview that he was preparing for the worst and that the government is working with partners to strengthen "defence cooperation". In anticipation of the referendum, the Commonwealth of Nations had also issued a statement offering its "full support" to Guyana and urged "all members of the United Nations" to respect the ICJ's decision. On 8 December, Maduro stated in a political rally that he had appointed several personnel to handle the incorporation of the Esequibo and signed several decrees, but he stated that this process would be completed in a timeframe "up until 2030".

=== Militarisation of the Brazilian border ===
On 5 December, the Brazilian Army mobilised 20 Iveco LMV vehicles to join the newly activated 18th Mechanised Cavalry Regiment based in Boa Vista, being expected to arrive in early January. The regiment, originally planned to be activated in 2026, was created from the preexisting 12th Mechanised Cavalry Squadron on 29 November. (Note: Regiments and Squadrons being equivalent to Battalions and Companies, respectively, in Brazilian cavalry terminology) An additional 600 soldiers will be added to the newly created 18th Cavalry Regiment, and an armored task force composed of 28 armored vehicles was assembled. Brazilian defence minister José Múcio said the presidency had ordered him to "bulletproof the border". The Brazilian military was also concerned that the situation would lead to the creation of additional American military bases in the region. Sources within the military also told reporters that they were detecting no suspicious movement along the Brazilian border, with the precaution of deterrence working there, but they believed Venezuela was more likely to invade from the sea. Brazil is expected to triple its military presence in the border, with much materiel being moved thousands of kilometers from its South and Center-West regions.

On 8 December, Brazilian President Lula warned Maduro against "unilateral measures" by Venezuela regarding Essequibo. On December 11, Múcio characterised the crisis as a "political maneuver", and stated Brazil would not allow Venezuela troops to use its territory "in any hypothesis".

On 18 December it was announced that the Brazilian Army had sent hundreds of MSS-1.2 anti-tank missiles to reinforce the border with Venezuela, sending the weapons would be a way of deterring a possible threat from the Venezuelan armored force.

=== Venezuela authorises development in Essequibo ===
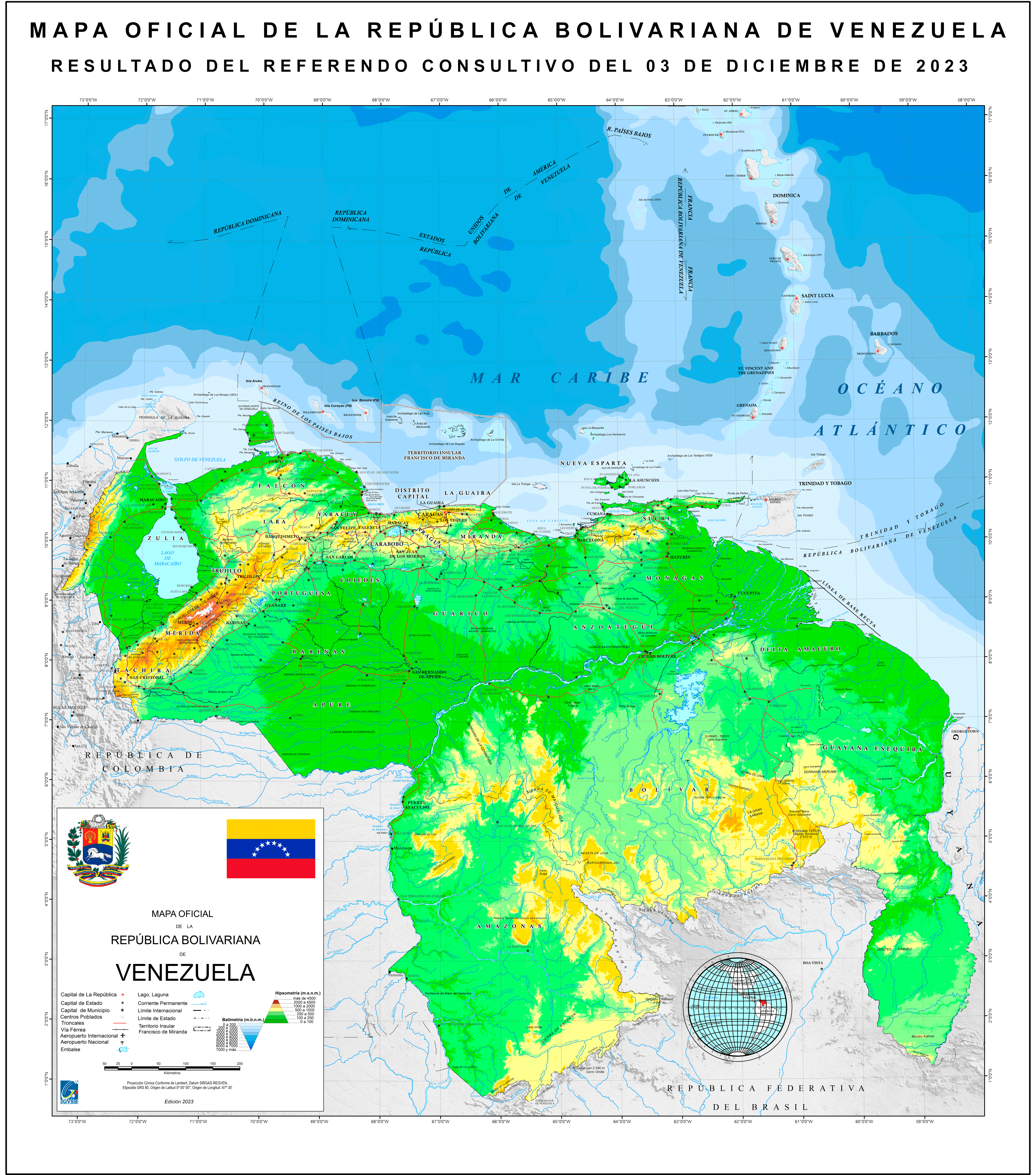
Among his decrees shortly after the referendum, Maduro ordered the publication of a new map, including the Esequibo territory, "in all schools, public entities, universities and 'in all homes' in the country".

On 4 December, National Bolivarian Armed Forces of Venezuela Strategic Commander Domingo Hernández Lárez made several posts on social media of Venezuelan military working on repairing or building new roads, bridges, airstrips and other infrastructure in the border with the Esequibo region, which he described as "our Guyanese routes". On 5 December, Venezuelan President Nicolás Maduro announced that he would soon permit the exploitation of resources such as gas, oil, and mineral deposits within the Essequibo. He also announced local Essequibo subsidiaries of Venezuelan state owned companies PDVSA and CVG. On the same day, Brazilian President Lula stated he'd make a presidential visit to Guyana next year, which analysts interpreted as signalling that Brazil would not tolerate Venezuelan military action. On 6 December, Lula announced a summit with special envoy Celso Amorim and foreign minister Mauro Vieira. The Brazilian Army reported to CNN Brasil that it had detected an increased Venezuelan military presence along the border with Guyana, though it assessed that the buildup by itself still wasn't indicative of an imminent invasion.

The Guyanese president told Brazilian media that President Lula assured him Brazil would support Guyana, and thanked him for Brazil's "mature" position, while characterising Venezuela as "reckless" and "unpredictable". He claimed they were working with the United States Southern Command and expected "strong statements" to be made within the next 24 hours. The United States also announced military exercises with Guyanese forces.

=== Venezuelan arrest warrants and detentions ===
The same day, the Venezuelan government issued fourteen arrest warrants against opposition members, including for three members from the team of opposition political candidate María Corina Machado, accusing them participating in an alleged plan to sabotage the 3 December referendum, supposedly financed by Exxon Mobil. It also confirmed the detention of an American citizen, Savoi Janson Wright, accused of financing them. That night, president of the Venezuelan NGO Súmate, Roberto Abdul, who also helped with the organisation of the opposition presidential primaries, was detained by officials of the Bolivarian Intelligence Service.

The Venezuelan government also issued orders against opposition leaders and dissident Chavistas, including Yon Goicoechea, Juan Guaidó, Julio Borges, Andrés Izarra, David Smolansky, Lester Toledo, Carlos Vecchio, Leopoldo López and Rafael Ramírez, accusing them of participating in a conspiracy to boycott and sabotage the referendum.

=== Guyanese helicopter crash ===
On 6 December, a Guyana Defence Force (GDF) Bell 412 helicopter crashed en route from Georgetown-Camp Ayanganna to Arau, situated directly along the Venezuelan border in Essequibo, coming down about 30 miles (48 km) east of Arau. It carried three crewmen and four passengers, and was piloted by GDF Lieutenant Colonel Michael Charles. According to the Chief of Staff of the Guyanese military, Omar Khan, there were no indications the aircraft was shot down from the sky. Authorities had stated that there was "bad weather" in the area. Five GDF soldiers were killed and two survived.

=== US military involvement ===
The United States Southern Command said on 7 December that its forces would participate in joint operations beside the Guyana Defence Force (GDF) in an effort to improve collaboration with security measures. US statements also said that the United States "will continue its collaboration with the GDF in the areas of disaster preparedness, aerial and maritime security, and countering transnational criminal organizations" and that the North American nation "will continue its commitment as Guyana's trusted security partner and promoting regional cooperation and interoperability."

Vladimir Padrino Lopez, Venezuelan defence minister, described the actions of the United States as a "provocation", saying that Venezuela "will not be diverted from our future actions for the recovery of the Essequibo."

=== Diplomatic discussions ===
Prime Minister of Saint Vincent and the Grenadines Ralph Gonsalves issued letters on 9 December to presidents Ali and Maduro, saying his nation would host discussions on the conflict alongside President Lula and UN Secretary-General Guterres, writing "Let us all resolve to make this historic gathering a successful one. So much is at stake for our Caribbean and Latin American civilization." It was announced that the discussions would be mediated by the Caribbean Community (CARICOM) and the Community of Latin American and Caribbean States (CELAC). Ali and Maduro agreed to the talks, with a proposed date of 14 December being announced. Following a phone call with Lula, President Maduro stated that he was looking for "peace and understanding". Representatives from both nations reaffirmed their beliefs on the dispute; Venezuela continued its claims of sovereignty over the Esequiba region while Guyana said that a determination by the ICJ must be made.

On 14 December, high representatives (including the presidents) of Venezuela and Guyana met in Saint Vincent and the Grenadines, and agreed to not use any force and to not escalate tensions over Esequiba. A joint statement said both countries will settle the dispute in accordance with international law, despite adding Venezuela does not recognise the ICJ jurisdiction over the case. Officials from the CARICOM, Brazil, Colombia, the United Nations and the CELAC also attended the meeting. Further talks were scheduled to be held in Brazil within three months from the meeting.

On 15 December, Brazilian Defence Minister José Múcio mentioned Brazil was prepared to "take more energetic measures if necessary" to guarantee Brazilian territorial integrity. O Estado de S. Paulo reported that the Boa Vista-based 1st Jungle Infantry Brigade had received dozens of units of the Brazilian-made MSS-1.2 anti-tank guided missile. The early adoption of the ATGM, still in its evaluation stages, would seek to provide a solution to a lack of dedicated anti-tank capabilities in the Brazilian Army at the time of the border crisis.

=== UK military involvement ===
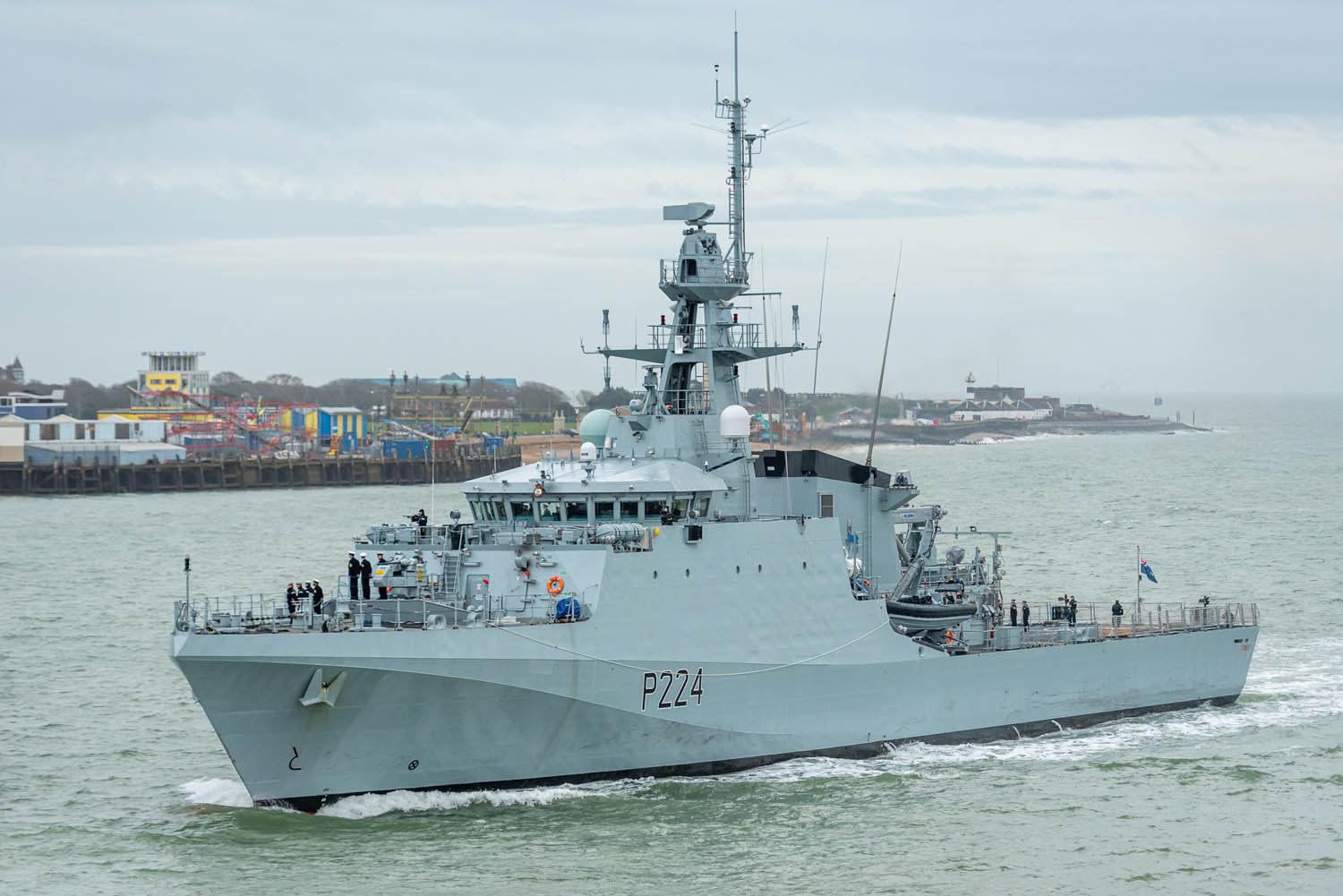
In late December, the United Kingdom announced its deployment of HMS Trent to Guyana.

On 17 December, United Kingdom's minister for the Americas and Caribbean David Rutley visited Guyana, and said "I am in Guyana... to offer the UK's unequivocal backing to our Guyanese friends". Rutley also met with ambassadors of the United States, France, Canada and the European Union to speak about international support for Guyana in the dispute.

The UK announced on 24 December it was sending one warship (HMS Trent) to the coast of Guyana without mentioning Venezuela. Venezuelan Defence Minister Vladímir Padrino López said on social media that Venezuela would stay "on alert following provocations that put at risk the peace and stability of the Caribbean and our America."

On 28 December, Venezuelan president Nicolas Maduro ordered over 5,600 Venezuelan military personnel to carry out "defensive" military exercises in response to the deployment of HMS Trent to Guyana.

=== 2024 Venezuelan troop buildup ===
In response to perceived Venezuelan military buildups, Brazil reinforced its garrison in Boa Vista by 600 personnel and 20 armored vehicles on February 2, 2024. On February 9, the Center for Strategic and International Studies reported on construction works and a troop buildup taking place in a Venezuelan military base in the border between Venezuela and Guyana in Ankoko Island. Videos from Venezuelan military social media accounts and Maxar satellite imagery of the area in the weeks leading up to the January 25 meeting in Brasília showed the construction of a new jungle tank base taking place, as well as the presence of several assets such as IAI Arava and Mi-17 aircraft; EE-11 Urutu, Scorpion 90 and Cadillac Gage Commando AFVs; and a Mabey Compact 200 bridge. The CSIS's Christopher Hernandez-Roy referred to the Venezuelan troop buildup as indicative of Maduro "pursuing a duplicitous policy". Venezuelan General Domingo Hernández Lárez, commander of the Strategic Operational Campaign of the National Bolivarian Armed Forces, referred to the satellite imagery in the CSIS's report as being "North American imperial espionage [...] in service of its sepoys".

=== 2026 clashes ===
On 29 May 2026, a Guyanese soldier was wounded after a patrol vessel on the Cuyuni River came under fire from armed men in Venezuela.

== Analysis and military capability assessments ==
Analysts noted the decision of the Maduro administration to call a referendum may be an attempt to divert attention from Venezuelan internal problems such as the weak economy and high levels of government corruption. Political analysts also see the referendum as a nationalist strategy by the Maduro government to rally support ahead of the 2024 Venezuelan presidential election.

Venezuela's actions towards annexing the Essequibo have been compared to the Russian invasion of Ukraine, including the preceding events of the annexation of Crimea by the Russian Federation and the 2014 Crimean status referendum. James G. Stavridis, former NATO Supreme Allied Commander Europe, stated that Venezuela's actions, including its referendum, were "an echo of Putin's invasion of Ukraine two years ago: a much larger neighbor staking a territorial claim without legitimate international legal grounds, preparing for annexation, making new maps and licking its chops at gaining huge natural resources." Igor Macedo de Lucena of Chatham House said "Putin openly gave passports to anyone who entered a Russian administration in Crimea and [the citizens] left their Russian. Maduro can say that there [in Essequibo] is a large population of Neo-Venezuelans and he goes there to defend them from an attack by the Guyana government, all kinds of ideas to misrepresent public opinion and make an attack 'legitimate', when in fact there is no such threat. It's the whole plot of an invasion." Analysts have said that a new conflict occurring within the Americas would benefit Russia as it would likely distract the United States. Russia's involvement is not limited to selling military hardware to Maduro, as there are two reported Russian military bases within Venezuelan territory, as well a detachment of the Wagner Group private military company, which is involved in training Venezuelan elite troops as well as providing personal security for Maduro.

Brazilian analyst Thiago de Aragão said Venezuela has far greater military capabilities than Guyana, which enrols about 3,000 troops in light combat vehicles. Venezuela reportedly has 123,000 land troops distributed into several regiments as well as 173 main battle tanks, such as AMX-30 and T-72B1, along with reconnaissance vehicles, infantry fighting vehicles and armoured personnel carriers, as well as over 3 million paramilitary militia. It also has significant air and naval assets, compared to only a token air force on Guyana's side. However, any aggression against Guyana could trigger an intervention by regional powers such as Brazil or the United States.

Visiting King's College London professor Augusto Teixeira said the Essequibo region mostly comprises mountains and dense tropical forest, with little to no roads. He suggests that the only feasible option for Venezuela would be moving its troops through Brazilian soil, in the state of Roraima. Military movements through Roraima would be significantly less hampered by the regional geography, as the Raposa Serra do Sol region is composed mostly of cerrado terrain, and the remaining wooded areas have been largely deforested. However, Brazil would not allow Venezuela to make any incursions from its territory. Venezuelan military is concentrated around Caracas and the northern border with Guyana along the Caribbean coast. Similarly, despite the Essequibo territory comprising around 70% of Guyanese territory, it is inhabited by only 125,000 out of Guyana's already much smaller 790,000 population. Gerard McDermott has argued that the revival of hostilities between the two states is consistent with the revival of other territorial disputes concerning the Neo-Authoritarian Bloc in recent years.

== Responses ==
=== Governments ===
- President of Brazil Luiz Inácio Lula da Silva raised concern about the crisis, saying "We do not want and we do not need war in South America."
- The Ministry of Foreign Affairs of India called for a peaceful resolution and to avoid an escalation, further stating that the country is "closely monitoring the border issue" on the Esequibo.
- Jamaica Minister of Foreign Affairs and Foreign Trade Kamina Johnson-Smith voiced support for Guyana and announced that "Guyana can continue to count on Jamaica's support of the Caribbean Community position in defence of its sovereign rights and territorial integrity".
- President of Nicaragua Daniel Ortega congratulated Venezuela on its referendum, saying that it demonstrated Venezuela's dedication "to peace and the future in the brotherhood of the nations of the world."
- Foreign Minister of Suriname Albert Ramdin said that despite Suriname's dispute with Guyana over the Tigri Area, it "supports Guyana's territorial integrity," stressing that Suriname is in favour of "peace in the region and does not want an armed conflict."
- The Ministry of Foreign Affairs of Ukraine called on Venezuela to respect the authority of the ICJ's 1 December decision and said that Guyana and Venezuela "must comply with the legally binding Order of the International Court of Justice on provisional measures and must not resort to unilateral actions that could aggravate the situation."
- The United Kingdom through the Foreign, Commonwealth and Development Office condemned Venezuela's actions, describing them as "unjustified" and that they "should cease." On 18 December 2023, David Rutley, the Parliamentary Under-Secretary of State for Americas and Caribbean, arrived in Guyana, stating that the United Kingdom provided its "unequivocal backing to our Guyanese friends" and that "[t]he border issue has been settled for more than 120 years ... We welcome the recent agreement by Venezuela ... to refrain from the use of force and any further escalation." On 24 December, the Royal Navy deployed HMS Trent to Guyana from its homeport in Gibraltar. The Atlantic Patrol Ship will anchor off of Georgetown and conduct training.
- United States Secretary of State Antony Blinken assured Guyanese president Mohamed Irfaan Ali in a 6 December phone call that Guyana has the "unconditional support" of the United States. Pentagon Press Secretary John Kirby said that the United States will "absolutely stand by our unwavering support for Guyana's sovereignty" on 7 December.

=== International bodies ===
- (Caribbean Community) In a joint statement, CARICOM stated that it "earnestly hopes that Venezuela is not raising the prospect of using force or military means to get its own way in this controversy over territory. After all, it has been the long-standing position of Latin American and Caribbean counties, including Venezuela, that our region must remain a zone of peace." Regarding the Venezuelan referendum, CARICOM said that "international law strictly prohibits the government of one State from unilaterally seizing, annexing or incorporating the territory of another state. An affirmative vote as aforesaid opens the door to the possible violation of this fundamental tenet of international law" and it condemned the wording of two referendum questions which says that Venezuela would enforce its claims to the territory "by all means", suggesting that Venezuela would use force.
- Responding to the Venezuelan referendum, Secretary General of the Commonwealth of Nations Patricia Scotland said that the Commonwealth "reaffirms its firm and steadfast support for the maintenance and preservation of the sovereign and territorial integrity of Guyana, and the unobstructed exercise of its rights to develop the entirety of its territory for the benefit of its people."
- (European Union) Josep Borrell called for a peaceful solution and to avoid unilateral actions, stressing that such actions could "put the stability of the region at risk."
- On 7 December, member states of the Mercosur trade bloc held a summit and discussed the crisis. Venezuela was not present, as it had been suspended in 2016 for breaking the bloc's democratic clause. Lula stated Brazil was looking for a peaceful solution and offered Brazil to mediate the situation. Sources say a joint statement from the bloc is being prepared.

== See also ==
- 2015 Colombia–Venezuela migrant crisis
- 2008 Andean diplomatic crisis
- Guyana–Venezuela relations
- Paris Arbitral Award
- South American Long Peace
