= EE-9 Cascavel =

Brazilian armoured car

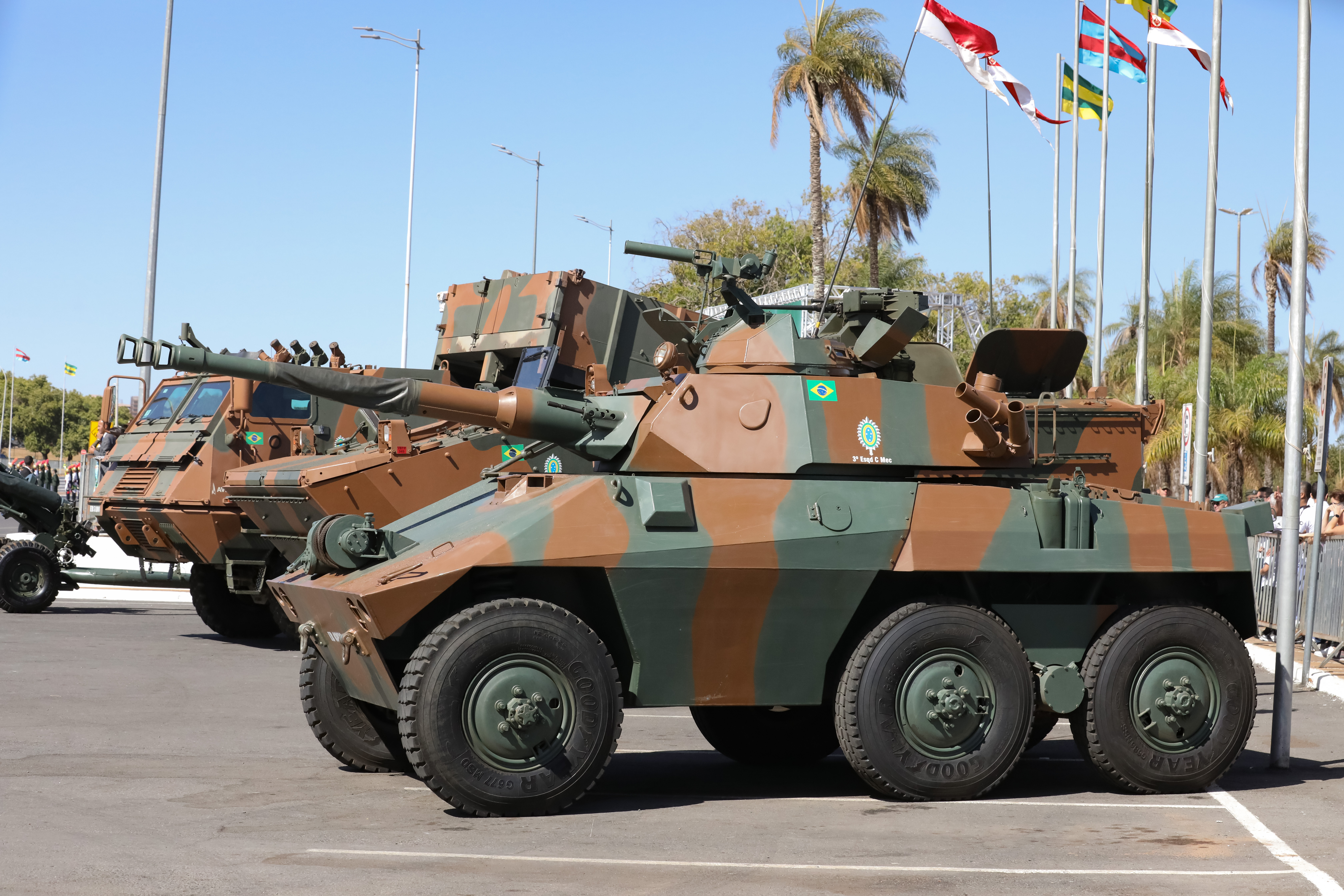
- Engesa EE-9 of the Brazilian Army at a public exhibit in 2022
- Type: Armoured car
- Place of origin: Brazil

Service history
- In service: 1974–present
- Used by: See Operators
- Wars: Colombian Civil War; Western Sahara War; Egyptian–Libyan War; Chadian–Libyan War; Iran–Iraq War; Gulf War; Second Congo War; Iraq War; Internal conflict in Burma; First Libyan Civil War; War in Iraq (2013–2017); Boko Haram insurgency Second Libyan Civil War

Production history
- Designer: Engesa
- Designed: 1970
- Manufacturer: Engesa
- Unit cost: USD $500,000 (new)
- Produced: 1974–1993
- No. built: 1,738
- Variants: See Variants

Specifications
- Mass: 12 tonnes (13 short tons; 12 long tons)
- Length: 6.29 m (20 ft 8 in)
- length: 5.25 m (17 ft 3 in) (hull)
- Width: 2.59 m (8 ft 6 in)
- Height: 2.60 m (8 ft 6 in)
- Crew: 3 (commander, driver, gunner)
- Main armament: 1 × 90mm Engesa EC-90 (44 rounds), 2 × MAX 1.2 AC anti-tank missiles (for Cascavel NG only)
- Secondary armament: 2× FN MAG (2,200–2,400 rounds)
- Engine: Detroit Diesel 6V-53N 5.2 L (320 in^{3}) 6-cylinder water-cooled diesel 158 kW (212 hp) at 2,800 rpm
- Power/weight: 15.82hp/tonne
- Suspension: 6X6 double axle boomerang drive
- Ground clearance: 0.375 m (1 ft 2.8 in)
- Fuel capacity: 360 L (95 US gal)
- Operational range: 750 km (470 mi)
- Maximum speed: 100 km/h (62 mph)

The EE-9 Cascavel (Portuguese pronunciation: [kɐskɐˈvɛl], translated to Rattlesnake) is a six-wheeled Brazilian armoured car developed primarily for reconnaissance. It was engineered by Engesa in 1970 as a replacement for Brazil's aging fleet of M8 Greyhounds. The vehicle was first fitted with the Greyhound's 37mm main gun, and subsequently, a French turret adopted from the Panhard AML-90. Later models carry unique Engesa turrets with a Belgian 90mm Cockerill Mk.3 cannon produced under licence as the EC-90.

The Cascavel shares many components with the EE-11 Urutu, its armoured personnel carrier counterpart; both entered production in 1974 and are now operated by over 20 nations in South America, Africa, and the Middle East. Rights to the design were also sold to the United States via the FMC Corporation. About 2,767 Cascavels and Urutus were manufactured before Engesa ceased operations in 1993.

== History ==
=== Development ===
Throughout the early 1960s, Brazil's bilateral defence agreements with the United States ensured easy access to a post-war surplus of American military equipment, including a number of World War II-vintage M8 Greyhound armoured cars. The Brazilian arms industry limited itself to restoring and maintaining this obsolete hardware until 1964 when American involvement in the Vietnam War placed restrictions on the amount of defence technology available for export. Brazil responded by creating an indigenous import substitution programme in 1968 aimed at reproducing US equipment already in service. Already in 1966 an article in the military periodical A Defesa Nacional had argued that the state of national automotive industry, highways and Petrobras fuel production made it viable to locally produce an 8–10 ton, 6x6 armoured vehicle, and by 1970 the Brazilian Army was developing an updated Greyhound known simply by its Portuguese initials, CRR (Carro de Reconhecimento sobre Rodas).

Engesa, then an obscure civilian engineering firm, took over the project and by November 1970 a prototype of an entirely new vehicle using the Greyhound's basic layout was completed. The new EE-9 Cascavel entered the pre-production phase between 1972 and 1973. Assembly lines for the Cascavel and its armoured personnel carrier counterpart, the EE-11 Urutu, were opened in 1974. The hulls were purchased by the Brazilian Army but mounted the same antiquated 37mm cannon and turret recycled from its elderly Greyhounds. To compete with more formidable armament available on the international market, Engesa also marketed a heavily modified Cascavel with an automatic transmission and the same 90mm (3.54 in) low-pressure gun found on the Panhard AML. This model, intended for export, drew interest in the Middle East and twenty were immediately purchased by Qatar.

The Qatari Cascavel sale proved to be a major success for Engesa, and Brazil's first successful inroad into the Arabian arms trade. Abu Dhabi followed suit with an order for two hundred Cascavels in 1977. Both Iraq and Libya chose the Cascavel in preference to the Panhard AML-90 or ERC-90 Sagaie, with the former negotiating a $400 million deal for the delivery of two hundred Cascavels and two hundred Urutus. Following the Libyan sale, Engesa unveiled a new production model carrying a Belgian designed, Cockerill main gun manufactured under licence as the EC-90 in Brazil.

=== Service ===
Gaddafi's Libyan Army successfully deployed a number of EE-9 Cascavels against Egyptian tanks, likely T-54/55s or T-62s, during the Libyan–Egyptian War in 1977. Libyan Cascavels also saw action in Chad, where they engaged AML-90s of the French Foreign Legion and French Marines. An unknown number of these armoured cars were later donated to the Polisario Front and Togo, while others remained in service as late as the 2011 Libyan Civil War. Cascavels were still in use during the 2016 battle of Sirte against the Islamic State.

Chad's Transitional Government of National Unity (GUNT) received five EE-9 Cascavels from Libya in 1986. Over the course of the Chadian–Libyan conflict, seventy-nine ex-Libyan Cascavels were captured or recovered from the Aouzou Strip by the Chadian military, which continues to hold them in storage.

The National Army of Colombia acquired 128 new EE-9 Cascavels in 1982, in order to modernize its equipment in case of an armed conflict with Venezuela. The armoured cars saw their first and most meaningful action during the Palace of Justice siege in 1985, when members of the M-19 guerrilla group took over the Palace of Justice in Bogotá. The EE-9s made some direct hits against the structure's external walls, which started a fire that destroyed the building and killed several hostages.

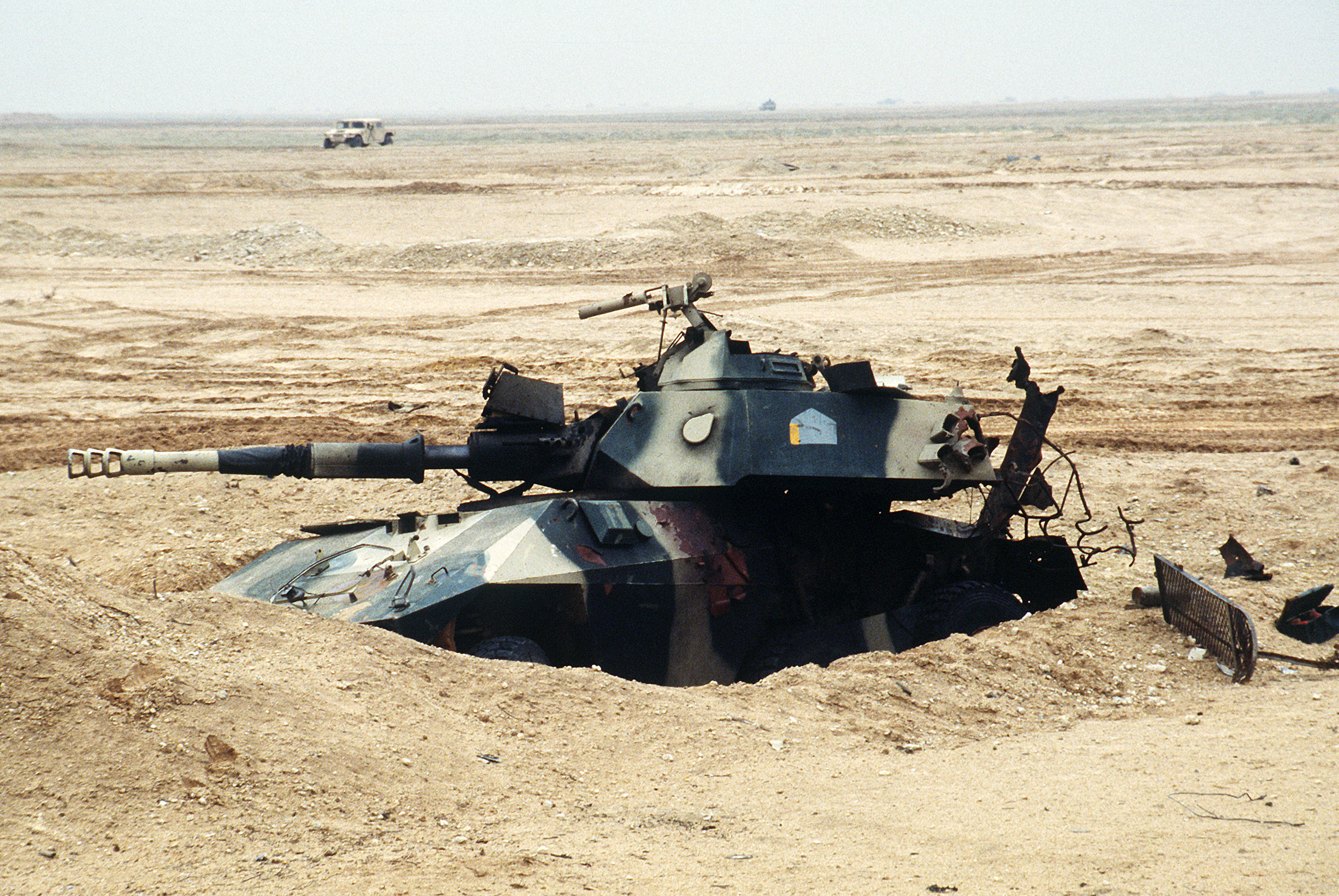
A battle-damaged Iraqi EE-9 Cascavel somewhere along the frontier with Saudi Arabia, during Operation Desert Storm

During the Iran–Iraq War, EE-9 Cascavels were operated by Iraqi garrisons near the Persian Gulf. The armored cars were frequently able to outmaneuver the heavier Iranian Chieftain tanks and tracked combat vehicles on the relatively flat, sandy terrain near the coastal region. Coalition air strikes later destroyed several north of Kuwait City in Operation Desert Storm. Following the 2003 invasion of Iraq, the surviving fleet was condemned for scrap; however, American technical personnel did restore thirty-five to working order in 2008 and presented them to the New Iraqi Army. Locally modified EE-9 were refurbished by Iraqi militias of the Popular Mobilization Forces, with some having their 90mm replaced or supplemented by DShK or ZPU machine guns, 107mm Type 63 rockets or a 2A28 Grom gun. They were used against Islamic State forces.

Zimbabwe procured ninety EE-9 Cascavels in 1984 as a suitable replacement for the Eland Mk7. At least one Zimbabwean Cascavel squadron deployed into Mozambique during the Mozambican Civil War to protect Harare's primary commercial links in Tete Province. The armoured cars provided armed escort for local convoys and patrolled the roads to preempt attacks by South African-backed Mozambican National Resistance (RENAMO) insurgents. During Zimbabwe's intervention in the Second Congo War, Ilyushin Il-76s commandeered from local charter firms were used to airlift twelve Cascavels to N'djili Airport. From there they subsequently engaged Rwandan troops advancing on Kinshasa. Some were abandoned by Zimbabwean troops in the Congo after being sabotaged beyond repair, while four others were captured by rebel factions. Few remain in present service due to lack of funds to source new parts from Brazil.

The EE-9 Cascavel also saw combat during the Myanmar civil war on the side of the State Administration Council, taking some losses.

The EE-9 Cascavel has found favour with many armies due to its simplified design and use of components already ubiquitous to civilian industry. Its low cost next to comparable Western armoured cars makes it an attractive purchase to developing nations in particular. At the height of the Cold War, the strictly commercial nature of Engesa sales—devoid of any political supplier restraints—was also perceived as an acceptable alternative to arms from NATO and the Warsaw Pact.

== Description ==
All EE-9 Cascavels have a similar layout—the driver is seated at the front of the vehicle and to the left, turrets are typically fitted above the centre, with motor and transmission situated at the rear. The Cascavel Mk II has a manual turret, but all later variants have electrically powered traverse. Cascavel Mk IIIs are equipped with an Engesa EC-90 90mm gun firing high explosive (HE), high explosive anti-tank (HEAT) or high explosive squash head (HESH) shells in cartridge form; a coaxial 7.62mm machine gun is also mounted to the left of the main armament. The EC-90 has an elevation of +15° and a depression of -8°. It is not stabilised and only mounts a rudimentary optical fire-control system, which has been upgraded with a laser rangefinder in Brazilian service. Late production Cascavels were fitted with run-flat tyres and a unique central tyre pressure regulator accessible from the driving compartment.

=== External ===
A boxy, boat-shaped vehicle, the EE-9 Cascavel has a steep frontal glacis which slopes upwards and back towards the horizontal hull roof, with recesses for the headlamps and a thick glacis plate over the driver's seat. The hull sides are nearly vertical, but also sloped inwards towards the roof. There is a low, well-rounded turret on the forward section of the hull with a long, tapered gun barrel and a triple baffle muzzle brake.

== Variants ==
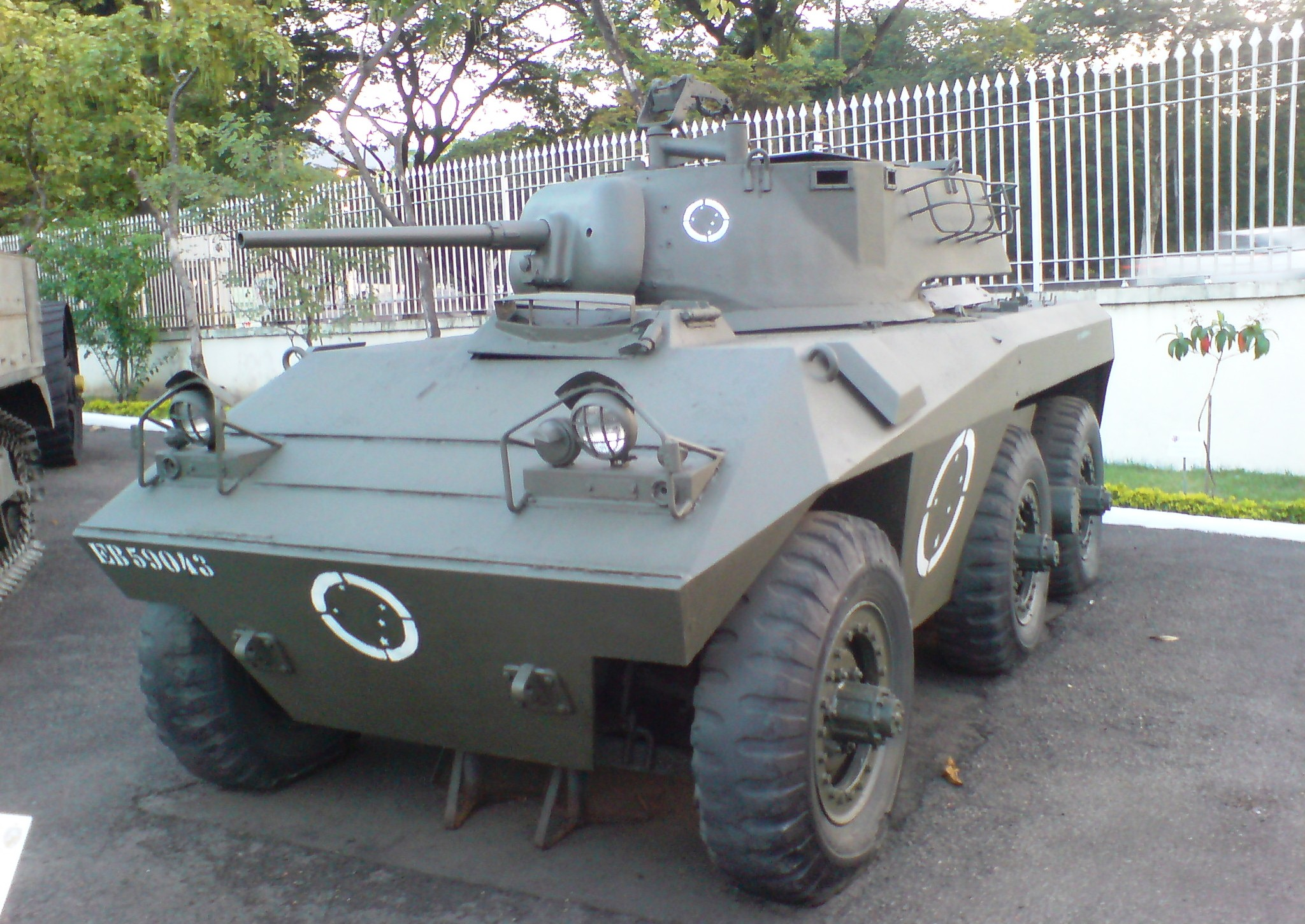
Cascavel Mk I at a museum in Rio de Janeiro

- Cascavel Mk I: Popularly nicknamed Cascavel Magro (skinny rattlesnake) for its small turret ring, this was Engesa's initial production model and only entered service with the Brazilian Army. It was equipped with a turret adopted from the M8 Greyhound and a manual transmission. Its prevailing feature were two sets of rear road wheels linked by an articulated, boomerang-shaped suspension which boosted rear wheel drive—a characteristic that became nearly synonymous with the Cascavel and Urutu.
- Cascavel Mk II: Popularly nicknamed Cascavel Gordo (fat rattlesnake) for its wide turret ring, this was Engesa's first export model and entered service with Qatar, Bolivia, the Sahrawi Arab Democratic Republic, and Libya. It was equipped with an H-90 turret adopted from the Panhard AML-90 and an automatic transmission.
- Cascavel Mk III: An improved EE-9 Cascavel Mk II refitted with a diesel engine and an Engesa turret carrying the new Brazilian-manufactured 90mm EC-90 main gun. An anti-aircraft prototype carrying twin 25mm autocannon was also trialled but not adopted. Most Cascavel Mk Is were upgraded to this standard, including automatic transmissions, for the Brazilian Army.
- Cascavel Mk IV: First production model to be equipped with run-flat tyres and the tyre pressure regulator. Also carried a more integrated fire control system.
- Cascavel Mk V: An EE-9 Cascavel Mk IV fitted with a Mercedes-Benz OM52A diesel engine developing 190 hp (142 kW). This was the final variant offered for sale by Engesa.
- Cascavel Mk VI: Derivative of the EE-9 Cascavel Mk V with a Mercedes-Benz OM352A diesel engine.
- Cascavel Mk VII: EE-9 Cascavel Mk V with the MT-643 gearbox of the Mk IV.
- Cascavel NG: A modernized variant by AKAER Engenharia ordered by the Brazilian Army in July 2022 with a new and modern engine, complete revitalization and overhaul of the chassis and 90 mm main gun, turret with automated control, air conditioning, replacement of the optronics, MAX 1.2 AC anti-tank missile launchers in its main turret, a new shooting computer, new sensors and communications systems. 98 units ordered as a first batch.

== Operators ==
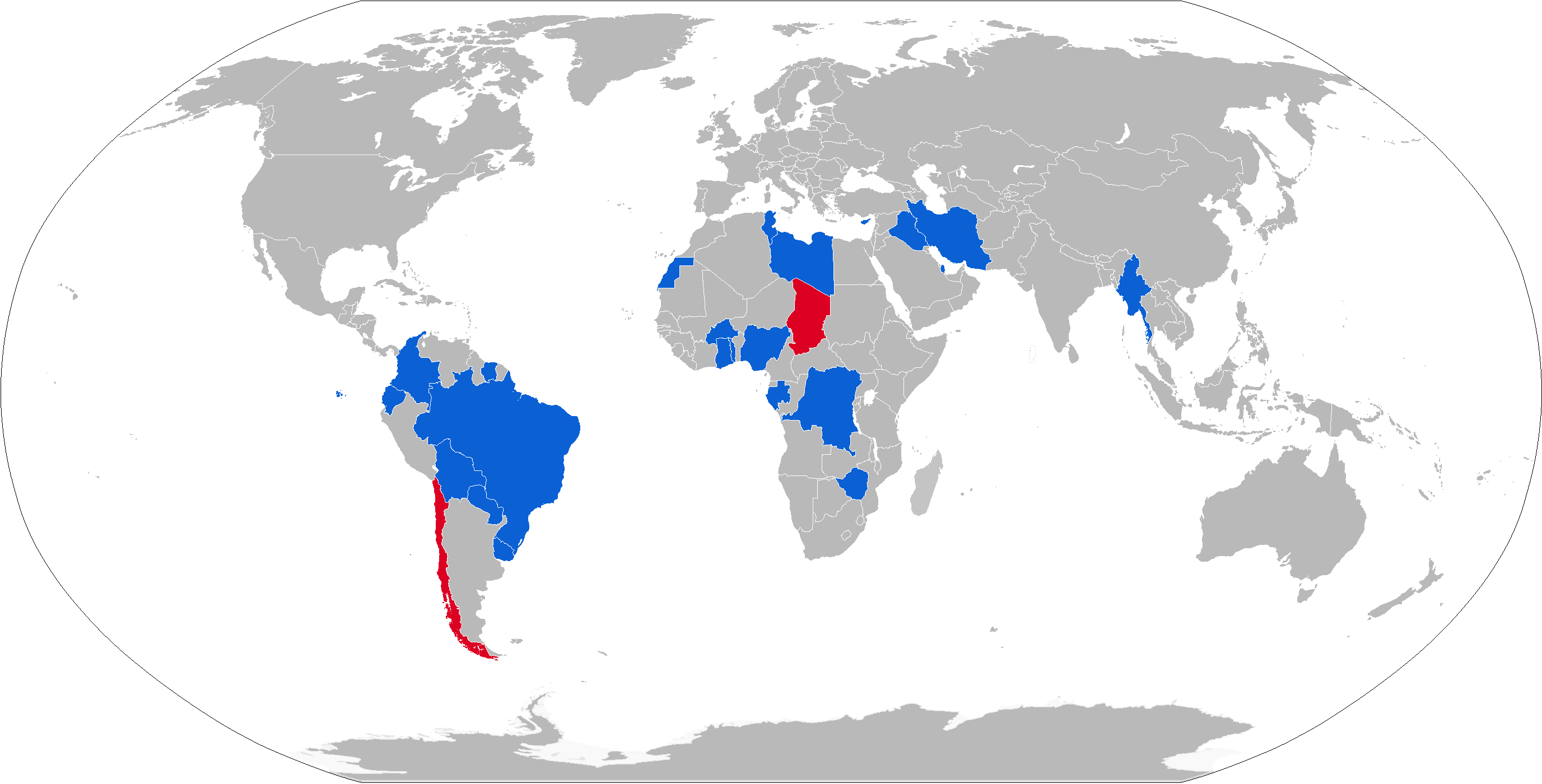
Operators Current Former

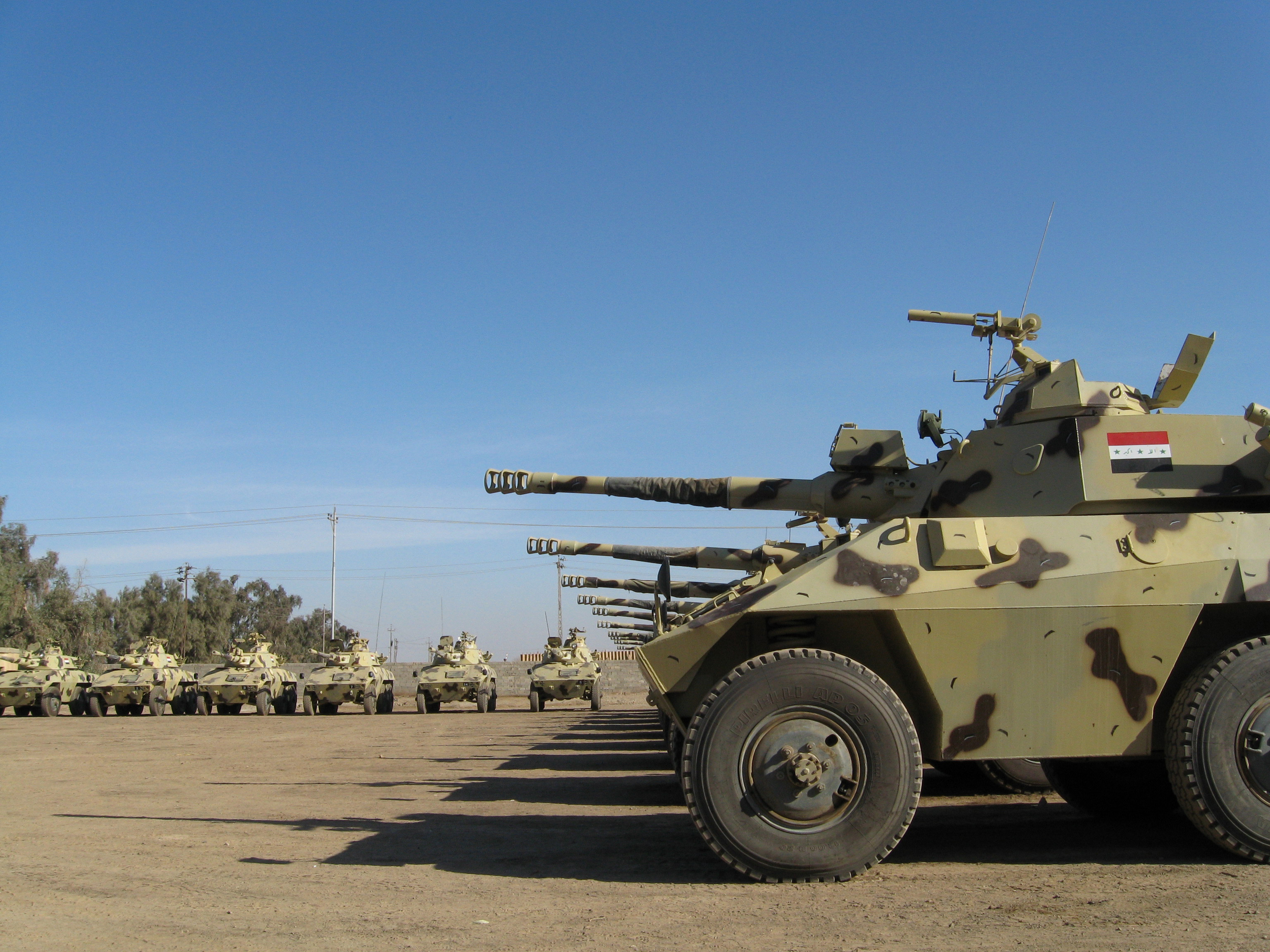
EE-9 Cascavels of the Iraqi Army in 2008

=== Current operators ===
- Bolivia: 24
- Brazil: 600 (409 operational in 2010) 98 being modernized to the "Cascavel NG" standard, remaining in process of replacement by the Centauro II 8×8.
- Burkina Faso: 24
- Chad: 20
- Colombia: 121
- Cyprus: 126
- Democratic Republic of the Congo: 19
- Ecuador: 22 to 28
- Gabon: 14
- Ghana: 3
- Guyana: 18
- Iran: 130 to 150; 35 operational as of 2004.
- Iraq: 232 to 364; 35 operational as of 2008.
- Libya: 380 to 500; 70 operational as of 2011.
- Morocco: 7
- Myanmar: 150
- Nigeria: 75
- Paraguay: 28 to 30
- Qatar: 20
- Sahrawi Arab Democratic Republic: 29
- Suriname: 6 to 7
- Tunisia: 24
- Uruguay: 15
- Zimbabwe: 90; 10 operational and 77 reserve as of 2011.

=== Former operators ===
- Chile: 83
- People's Mojahedin Organization of Iran
- Togo: 36, from Libya

== See also ==
=== Engesa series ===
- EE-3 Jararaca
- EE-11 Urutu
- EE-T1 Osório

=== Vehicles of comparable role, performance, and era ===
- Alvis Saladin – (United Kingdom)
- Eland Mk7 – (South Africa)
- ERC 90 Sagaie – (France)
- Panhard AML – (France)
- VBC-90 – (France)

== Notes and citations ==
Citations

Online sources

- SIPRI, (various) (2009). "Trade Registers". Solna: Stockholm International Peace Research Institute. Archived from the original on 14 April 2010.
- Hurrell, Andrew (2014) [1986]. "The quest for autonomy: the evolution of Brazil's role in the international system, 1964-1985" (PDF). Rio de Janeiro: Fundação Alexandre de Gusmão. Archived from the original (PDF) on June 2, 2015.
- Cordesman, Anthony, Vira, Varun, and Arleigh (20 June 2011). "The Libyan Uprising: An Uncertain Trajectory" (PDF). Washington: Center for Strategic and International Studies. Archived from the original (PDF) on 5 March 2016.
- Rosencrans, Aaron (21 February 2008). "U.S. hands over 35 Cascavels to Iraqi Army". Washington: Defense Imagery.
- Martin, Guy (23 April 2013). "Democratic Republic of Congo". Johannesburg: Defence Web.
- HRW, (various) (10 October 2007). "Burma: Security Council should impose arms embargo". New York: Human Rights Watch.
- Bastos, Expedito Carlos Stephani (14 September 2017). "Uma experiência real: EE-9 Cascavel em combate Líbia e Iraque 2015 – 2017". DefesaNet.
- Forecast International, (various) (August 1995). EE-9 Cascavel. Military Vehicles Forecast.

Newspaper and journal articles

- Martins, Dean (1994). "Brazil - The Armed Forces of a Regional Superpower". Jane's Intelligence Review: Yearbook: 142–143.
- Elliot, Jeffrey (1987). "Who supplies the matches?". Third World Annual 88/89: 229. ISBN 9780879677077.
- Neto, Raul de Gouvea (1991). "How Brazil Competes In The Global Defense Industry" (PDF). Latin American Research Review. 26 (3): 83–108. doi:10.1017/S0023879100023943. S2CID 252930890. Archived from the original (PDF) on December 8, 2014.
- Godoy, Robert (1986). "Brazilian hybrid Cascavel for Iraq". Strategic Digest. 16: 1309.
- Bastos, Expedito Carlos Stephani (June 2006). "Uma realidade brasileira - As exportações dos veículos militares Engesa" (PDF). Revista DaCultura. 6 (10): 36–41. Archived from the original (PDF) on 2016-01-07.
- Bastos, Expedito Carlos Stephani (December 2004). "Uma realidade brasileira - Desenvolvimento de blindados sobre roadas 1967–1975" (PDF). Revista DaCultura. 4 (7): 36–45. Archived from the original (PDF) on 2019-02-25.
- UPI (9 December 1980). "Arms trade expands in South America" (PDF). The Hopewell News. Hopewell, Virginia. Archived from the original (PDF) on 28 October 2017.
- Rocha, Cezar Marques da (April 1966). "O carro de combate nacional". A Defesa Nacional. 52 (606): 119–122.
- Staff Reporter (20 July 2011). "Zimbabwe army crippled: Report exposes decay". The Zimbabwean. Johannesburg, Gauteng.
- Kahiya, Vincent (19 May 2000). "Zimbabwe: Controversy Over $600m Spare Parts For ZNA". The Zimbabwe Independent. Harare, Zimbabwe.
- AIPD (1999). An introduction to the armed forces of China, Cuba, Syria, Libya, and Angola (PDF). Fort Huachuka, Arizona: United States Army Intelligence Center.
- College (1985). National security and mobilization management: regional studies program: academic year 1984-1985. Washington D.C.: Industrial College of the Armed Forces (U.S.).

Bibliography

- Foss, Christopher (2000). Jane's Tanks and Combat Vehicles Recognition Guide. London: HarperCollins. ISBN 978-0007183265.
- Chant, Christopher (2013) [1987]. A Compendium of Armaments and Military Hardware. London: Routledge. ISBN 978-1315884851.
- Ogorkiewicz, Richard (2015). Tanks: 100 Years of Evolution. Oxford: Osprey Publishing. ISBN 9781472806703.
- Grandolini, Albert; Cooper, Tom (2015). Libyan Air Wars: Part 1: 1973-1985. Solihull: Helion & Co. Ltd. ISBN 978-1909982390.
- Damis, John James (1983). Conflict in Northwest Africa: The Western Sahara Dispute. Stanford: Hoover Institution Press. ISBN 978-0817977818.
- Tucker-Jones, Anthony (2014). The Gulf War: Operation Desert Storm 1990-1991. Stanford: Pen & Sword Books, Ltd. ISBN 978-1781593912.
- Emerson, Stephen (2014). The Battle for Mozambique. Solihull: Helio & Co. Ltd. ISBN 978-1909384927.
- Cooper, Thomas (19 October 2013). Great Lakes Conflagration: Second Congo War, 1998 2003. Solihull: Helio & Co. Ltd. ISBN 978-1909384668.
- Gupta, Amit (1997). Building an Arsenal: The Evolution of Regional Power Force Structures. Westport: Praeger. ISBN 978-0275957872.
- Cordesman, Anthony (30 September 2004). The Military Balance in the Middle East. Westport: Praeger. ISBN 978-0275983994.
- International Institute for Strategic Studies (February 2021). The Military Balance 2021. Vol. 121. Routledge. ISBN 9781032012278.
