= Sharif Harir =

Sharif Abdallah Harir (Arabic: جشريف عبد الله حرير, romanized: Šarīf ʻAbd Allāh Ḥarīr) is a Sudanese, Darfuri Zaghawi social anthropologist, politician and a rebel leader.

Harir has worked as an lectioner in the Nordic Africa Institute and a professor of social anthropology in the University of Khartoum, before returning to Darfur and becoming deputy chairman and Foreign Affairs Representative of the SLA-Unity faction. In the early 1990s Harir co-founded the Sudan Federal Democratic Alliance with Ahmed Diraige. Harir has been described as one of the first scholars to recognize the dangers of the Tajammu al-Arabi, a rebel group funded by Muammar Gaddafi.
