= Ahmed Diraige =

Sudanese rebel (1933–2020)

Ahmed Ibrahim Diraige
- أحمد إبراهيم دراج
- Diraige in 2007

Governor of Darfur
- In office January 1980 – 25 December 1983
- Deputy: Mahmud Bashir Jamma
- Preceded by: Al-Tayyib al-Mardi

Personal details
- Born: 1933 Zalingei, Anglo-Egyptian Sudan
- Died: 20 September 2020 (aged 86–87) Botswana
- Party: Darfur Development Front; Sudan Federal Democratic Alliance
- Other political affiliations: National Democratic Alliance; National Redemption Front

Ahmed Ibrahim Ali Diraige (1933 – 20 September 2020) was the former governor of the Sudanese province of Darfur and late head of the National Redemption Front alliance of rebel groups in the Darfur conflict. He was residing in the United Kingdom.

== Governorship ==
Diraige was a Fur, born to a shartai (paramount chief) in 1933. As a young politician, he created the Darfur Development Front (DDF) to create a common agenda to advocate for the region's interests. However, he proved unable to bring all the provincial interests into a common front. Although, the Front was popular from its creation with Fur because of its founder's ethnic connections, it was open to all Darfuris; its name suggesting that "development" should be the primary concern of political action. By the time of the February 1968 election, the politics had become ethnically polarized between rival factions of the Umma Party. Sadiq al-Mahdi, calculating that the province's demographics favored the "African" tribes, successfully courted the DDF, leaving Imam al-Hadi to mobilize the "Arab" vote. Sadiq's faction won 13 of 24 seats, while the faction led by al-Hadi received seven. The factions were reconciled only when the parliamentary government was overthrown by the military coup of colonel Gaafar Nimeiry in May 1969. Both Diraige and al-Sadiq were arrested, while al-Hadi was executed.

In 1979, Darfuris rioted after their province became the only one in which the governor, al-Tayyib al-Mardi, was not locally chosen. Nimeiry had chosen al-Tayyib al-Mardi to oversee the support to the Chadian guerilla force led by Hissène Habré, but grew concerned that he was losing control of the situation. In January 1980, he dismissed al-Tayyib al-Mardi and appointed Diraige. The appointment of the DDR leader resulted in an immediate lessening of tensions. Diraige refused to accept a salary and quickly concentrated on replacing posts filled due to political patronage with largely apolitical civil servants from across the ethnic spectrum who had all been affiliated with the DDF since 1964. The many problems facing the provincial government, including rising racial tensions, the accumulated administrative neglect and spillover from the conflict in Chad, was soon superseded by steadily diminishing rains. In the 1981 provincial elections, ethnicity had become a dominant political factor and Diraige, with his large Fur base of support and long out of jail, easily won the governorship. His election, in turn sparked plans by Darfuri Arabs to join with the Zaghawa and Fellata and form an "Arab Alliance."

The Diraige government soon realized that they could not dig water boreholes quickly enough to make up for the lowered amount of rainfall. In November 1983, Diraige wrote a letter to Nimeiry warning him that, unless foreign food aid was requested, Darfur faced a serious famine. This letter would come to be known as the "famine letter." Since 1977, Nimeiry had been creating an image of Sudan as the "future breadbasket of the Arab world", was furious with Diraige for sending this inconvenient letter and refused to respond. On 23 December 1983, Diraige flew to Khartoum to present his case in person. Nimeiry made his displeasure clear and stated that he would not ask for aid. An arrest warrant for Diraige was issued about 48 hours later, which he escaped by flying to Saudi Arabia. By August 1984, the existence of the famine was obvious and Nimeiry was forced to declare Darfur a "disaster zone". The story of Diraige, the first locally accountable governor who had been forced into exile for warning of a preventable famine, became widely known, further aggravating tensions between Darfur and the northerner-dominated government.

== Exile ==
By 1987, the situation had worsened. The Libya-Chad War overflowed into the province, resulting in widespread violence. Many Fur military conscripts fighting the Second Sudanese Civil War deserted to the side of the Sudan People's Liberation Army (SPLA). Sudanese brigadier Fadlallah Burma Nasir and Chief of Staff brigadier Fawzi Ahmed el-Fadl visited Diraige at his home in London, asking if he would come back and support the government to stop the desertion of Fur soldiers. Diraige refused. In the late 1980s, Darfuri politician Daud Bolad sought help from the SPLA in extending the rebellion to Darfur. Other leftist leaders, such as Diraige, believed that the SPLA would use them for its own purpose and intentionally did not associate themselves with the southern rebels. Bolad's capture in 1991 and the destruction of his resistance network was seen as confirmation that this was the correct stance.

Diraige created the Sudan Federal Democratic Alliance (SFDA), a member organization of the opposition National Democratic Alliance. From 1996, SFDA deputy Sharif Harir set up an office in Asmara, Eritrea, from which it actively recruited armed fighters from migrant Darfuris. On 23 January 2004, Sudanese Vice President Ali Osman Taha met Diraige in Nairobi, while ostensibly on hajj break from talks in Naivasha ending the war in the south. Diraige used his personal credibility to get the Darfuri rebels to agree to talks on humanitarian matters in Geneva to be mediated by the Henri Dunant Foundation, as a trust-building first step. The government then broke Diraige's trust by publicly demanding a meeting on "national reconciliation" in Khartoum. This had been the last line of communication that the government still had with the Fur rebels. In 2003, the Darfur Liberation Front, a new rebel group fighting a steadily escalating conflict asked the SFDA for political and logistical support. Harir agreed and declared that the DLF fighters were the military wing of the SFDA. However, Diraige disagreed that this was the time for armed rebellion and the DLF got no substantive support.

This position apparently changed. In June 2006, Diraige was named the head of the National Redemption Front, a coalition of the SFDA, Justice and Equality Movement and the faction of the Sudan Liberation Army (SLA) that had not signed the May deal taken by the faction of the SLA led by Minni Minnawi.

== Death ==
He died on 20 September 2020 in Botswana, and has been buried on 30 September 2020 in the state of Central Darfur.
