= Al-Nour al-Qubba =

Sudanese general

- النور القبة
- Born: Al-Nour Ahmed Adam; North Darfur, Sudan
- Relatives: Musa Hilal
- Military career
- Allegiance: Sudan
- Branch: Sudanese Armed Forces (2003–2017; 2026–present); Rapid Support Forces (2017–2026)
- Service years: 2003–present
- Rank: Major general
- Unit: Border Guards (2003–2017)
- Conflicts: War in Darfur; Sudanese civil war (2023–present); Battle of Kutum; Siege of El Fasher
- Criminal information
- Criminal charges: Desertion; Abandonment of military positions Communication with an enemy army Rebellion against constitutional order
- Penalty: Death in absentia
- Wanted by: Rapid Support Forces (Government of Peace and Unity)

Al-Nour al-Qubba (Arabic: النور القبة) is a Sudanese military officer who served as a founding member of the Rapid Support Forces (RSF) until he defected to the Sudanese Armed Forces (SAF) in April 2026.

Al-Qubba began his career in 2003 as a member of the Border Guards under the command of Musa Hilal, a relative. After a rift between Hilal and then-Sudanese president Omar al-Bashir, al-Qubba was promoted to the Border Guards' command. He co-founded the RSF in 2017, serving as its third-most senior member. After the outbreak of the Sudanese civil war in April 2023, he participated in the battle of Kutum and the siege of El Fasher, both of which resulted in massacres of civilians. He defected to the SAF in an operation backed by Sudanese intelligence after the RSF refused to appoint him as head of the military government of North Darfur, becoming the most senior deserter from the militia. In response, the RSF sentenced him to death in absentia.

== Early life ==
Al-Qubba was born in North Darfur as al-Nour Ahmed Adam. He is a prominent member of the Mahamid tribe and a member of Musa Hilal's family.

== Career ==
Al-Qubba's military career began in 2003, as a member of the Border Guards led by Musa Hilal. In 2006, he participated in a brief rebellion led by Hemedti and Idriss Hassan in Darfur, but was reintegrated into the Border Guards several years later with the rank of colonel. His return to the government was facilitated by Adam an-Nahla "Mawazin", the deputy of North Darfur governor Osman Kebir. The government gave him a base in the town of Qubba between 2008 and 2009, and he went on to form a force of up to 600 men and 100 vehicles. A 2017 report by Small Arms Survey considered al-Qubba's force one of the most loyal pro-government militias in North Darfur. Between 2014 and 2015, al-Qubba served as a minister in the Federal Governance Bureau under President Omar al-Bashir. Due to tensions between al-Bashir's government and Hilal, al-Bashir sought out rival members in Hilal's family, leading to al-Qubba's promotion to a command role within the Border Guards. As a key commander in the militia, he led several military offensives in Darfur during the War in Darfur, including the February 2016 capture of Fanga and the areas north of Jebel Marra following clashes with the Sudan Liberation Movement/Army led by Abdul Wahid al-Nur.

=== Rapid Support Forces ===
Al-Qubba joined the Rapid Support Forces (RSF) after the Border Guards were merged into the militia, holding the rank of major general. A founding member of the RSF, Africa Intelligence described him as the militia's third-in-command. Following the withdrawal of the United Nations–African Union Mission in Darfur, the "Peace Shield" division was established in January 2021 under al-Qubba's command. It was made up of RSF fighters and local militias, and was tasked with protecting civilians. The force was accused of committing numerous violations, such as looting property. During this time, al-Qubba spoke with the BBC from El Fasher, where he stated that his force's goals were to defend civilians and secure the delivery of humanitarian aid.

Al-Qubba emerged as a prominent field commander in the Sudanese civil war that began in April 2023. Following the capture of Kutum in June 2023, al-Qubba reportedly ordered the attacks on the town and neighboring Kassab in North Darfur, where RSF forces committed massacres against non-Arabs, killing at least 70 in Kutum. Al-Qubba was present at the scene during the massacres and commanded the attack alongside Lt. Col. Ali-Hamid al-Taher, who was killed in combat in June 2024. Al-Qubba took a command role in the siege of El Fasher in April 2024. Following the killing of RSF commander Ali Yaqoub Gibril in June, who oversaw its forces in El Fasher, al-Qubba was promoted to commander of the siege. The siege escalated under his command, with the UN declaring a famine in the city after the delivery of medical supplies and food was disrupted. Using his knowledge of the area's terrain and his close relations with RSF deputy commander Abdul Rahim Dagalo, he launched an offensive that captured the city in October 2025, with five brigades under his command. A UN fact-finding mission described the RSF's conduct during the siege as genocide due to the militia's indiscriminate shelling and targeting of civilians.

Amid the siege of El Fasher, doubts began forming within the RSF over al-Qubba's loyalty; due to this mistrust, al-Qubba did not meet Hemedti since the civil war began. Al-Qubba was further upset when Gedo Hamdan Ahmed was appointed commander of the North Darfur military government after the capture of El Fasher rather than him, leading him to feel marginalized. Al-Qubba then returned to his home in al-Waha and began contacting the Sudanese Armed Forces (SAF). Soon after, the RSF sent a delegation to meet with al-Qubba, and he redirected them to meet with his family due to his perceived marginalization. When the delegation met with al-Qubba's family, they refused the mediation efforts and requested to meet with Hemedti or Abdul Rahim instead. However, they were denied due to suspicions that al-Qubba was tasked to kill senior RSF leaders.

=== Defection to the SAF ===
On 9 April 2026, al-Qubba narrowly escaped an RSF unit that had been sent to capture him and disarm his troops in the town of Qubba, near Kutum. The RSF intended to extradite him to Nyala and charge him with rebellion. He then departed from the area alongside a convoy of between 47 and 130 military vehicles. The withdrawal was carried out at 2:00 a.m. to maintain secrecy and was coordinated with the SAF's intelligence branch and Hilal. The SAF protected the force with unmanned aerial vehicles (UAVs) and targeted RSF checkpoints and positions that were aware of its movements, leading to clashes at one point. The force had to change its route several times, but ultimately arrived in SAF-controlled territory in Northern State on the evening of 18 April, completing an 800 km journey. Immediately upon his arrival, al-Qubba was met by SAF commander Abdel Fattah al-Burhan and other senior military commanders. Al-Burhan reportedly gave him his personal vehicle, according to Al Jazeera Arabic and Al Arabiya. Al-Qubba later recounted his convoy coming under attack by UAVs, destroying three vehicles. He added that its withdrawal, consisting of more than three combat groups, was facilitated by the Sudan Liberation Movement/Army led by Minni Minnawi.

With him, al-Qubba brought valuable knowledge on RSF supply lines in North Darfur that was projected to aid the SAF's offensive in Kordofan, along with intelligence on supply lines past the borders of Chad and Libya, and the locations of air defences, ammunition depots, and UAV launch sites. Additionally, al-Qubba's reconciliation with Hilal, both prominent tribal leaders of the Mahamid, was projected to consolidate tribal loyalty in Darfur. Several other RSF members reportedly deserted after al-Qubba's defection.

Following the defection, the RSF launched reprisal attacks against the Mahamid tribe in the area of Kutum, looting homes and arresting alleged supporters of al-Qubba. An RSF field court also demoted al-Qubba to private with Hemedti's approval and discharged him from the militia effective 22 April. The following day, he was sentenced to death in absentia, convicting him of desertion, contact with the enemy, abandoning his military post, and rebellion against the constitutional order.

=== Post-defection ===
After his arrival in SAF-controlled territory, al-Qubba was briefly sheltered near a camp that housed citizens internally displaced by the siege of El Fasher. On 1 May 2026, his forces, consisting of 180 men, were deployed near Jabal Awliya and south of Al-Salha, Omdurman. On 5 May, it was reported that the SAF returned his residence in Kafouri, Khartoum North, which had been held by the Operations Department of the General Intelligence Service (GIS) since the capital's recapture in March 2025. That same day, al-Qubba met the governor of Darfur, Minni Minnawi in Khartoum, where Minnawi urged national reconciliation. Later that month, it was reported that al-Qubba rejected proposals by al-Burhan to integrate his men into the SAF's ground forces, insisting that he maintain full control over his forces while fighting alongside the military.

On 10 June 2026, the Human Rights Watch published a report calling on the SAF to hold defected RSF commanders accountable for their crimes. The report named al-Qubba and accused him of overseeing extrajudicial killings and sexual violence in El Fasher. In July, he claimed that senior officials in the United Arab Emirates operated alongside members of Hemedti's family in command rooms to coordinate the RSF's activities in Darfur, Kordofan, and Khartoum. On 31 July, he met defectors from the RSF's "Group 26" alongside senior GIS officials.

On 26 October, he was sanctioned by the United Kingdom alongside 14 other Sudanese commanders from the SAF and RSF over his role in the attack on El Fasher.
