= Tijani Ibrahim Moussa Mohamed =

Sudanese military officer

- Nickname: Al Zeir Salem
- Allegiance: Rapid Support Forces
- Conflicts: Sudanese civil war (2023–present); Siege of El Fasher; El Fasher massacre

Tijani Ibrahim Moussa Mohamed also known as "Al Zeir Salem" is a Sudanese field commander of the Rapid Support Forces (RSF).

== Career ==
During his time as commander the Siege of El Fasher took place, which was followed by the El Fasher massacre. He was filmed after the fall of the city on 26 October 2025 at the Sudanese Armed Forces (SAF) 6th Infantry Division base in the city. At one point he was also filmed speaking to a large group of detained individuals in civilian clothing. Together with fellow RSF field commander Edris Kafuti he was determined by the Centre for Information Resilience to have been present at killing sites.

== Sanctions ==
On 12 December 2025 the United Kingdom imposed sanctions on Tijani Ibrahim Moussa Mohamed, Abdul Rahim Dagalo, Al-Fateh Abdullah Idris and Gedo Hamdan Ahmed for their roles in the El Fasher massacre. On 29 January 2026 European Union imposed sanctions on Tijani Ibrahim Moussa Mohamed and six others. On 19 February 2026 the United States also imposed sanctions on him, Idris and Ahmed and for their actions at El Fasher. They were placed on the Specially Designated Nationals and Blocked Persons List. On 24 February 2026 the United Nations Security Council committee established under United Nations Security Council Resolution 1591 added Tijani Ibrahim Moussa Mohamed, Dagalo, Idris and Ahmed to the sanctions regime.
