= Battle of Kutum =

Battle during the Darfur campaign of the War in Sudan

- Part of the Sudanese civil war (2023–present) and Darfur campaign
Date	May 30 – June 4, 2023
Location	Kutum and Kassab refugee camp, North Darfur, Sudan
Status	RSF victory

Belligerents
Sudanese government; Sudanese Armed Forces; 22nd Infantry Brigade	Rapid Support Forces

Commanders and leaders
Unknown	Al-Nour al-Qubba; Ali-Hamid Al-Taher

Units involved
22nd Infantry Brigade	Darfur Border Guards

Casualties and losses
- 75+ civilians killed 90% of Kutum's population flees

The Battle of Kutum was a conflict during the War in Sudan which occurred in and around the town of Kutum in North Darfur. The Rapid Support Forces quickly overran the city, and carried out massacres in the city and the neighboring Kassab IDP camp. The group then attacked neighboring villages in early June.

== Background ==
In Khartoum, the Sudanese capital, many Janjaweed enlisted into the Rapid Support Forces led by Hemedti, a paramilitary affiliated with the Sudanese Army founded in 2013. Civilian-administration leader Abdalla Hamdok was overthrown in 2021 by Abdel Fattah al-Burhan, the transitional military leader, with the aid of the RSF. However, by early 2023, tensions grew between Hemedti and Burhan over the integration of the RSF into the Sudanese Army, as the integration would heavily decrease RSF's independence and effectiveness. These tensions came to a head on April 15, when RSF soldiers attacked SAF positions in Khartoum and Merowe.

== Battle and massacre ==
There were no known attacks in Kutum the week fighting broke out on April 15, despite other cities in North Darfur such as El Fasher and Kabkabiya facing attacks by the RSF. This peace continued through May, even as ceasefires in El Fasher held up and the RSF consolidated control over Kabkabiya.

The fighting in Kutum began on May 30 after a local gang killed a Darfur Border Guards officer who was a relative of Janjaweed founder and war criminal Musa Hilal. The RSF then attacked central Kutum, sparking clashes between the group and the SAF. Despite the Sudanese government claiming to have repelled the RSF attack, residents stated that the city was captured by the RSF on June 4. The RSF released a video the next day of RSF fighters touring the garrison of the Sudanese Army's 22nd Brigade and showing captured SAF soldiers.

Clashes broke out in central Kutum on May 30, and spread to Kassab refugee camp on June 4. At least fifty civilians were killed in the attacks on Kassab, with many more injured. In the fighting, the market in Kutum was destroyed, along with much of Kassab. Minni Minnawi, the governor of Darfur region, called Kutum a "disaster zone" on June 5, and deplored the massacres. Residents speaking to Middle East Eye stated that the perpetrators of the attacks on Kassab were the RSF, and that official buildings in the town were torched. Many residents fled to El Fasher or Hashabah, both dozens of kilometers away.

North Darfur governor Nimir Abdelrahman released a statement deploring the killings. On June 7, the Sudanese Combating Violence Against Women Unit stated that at least 18 women, including teenagers, were raped by the RSF and aligned Darfur Border Guards after they captured the city. Attacks on villages surrounding Kutum began on June 9, with the mayor of Farouk town Mohamedein Bektum being executed by RSF fighters after refusing to give up his car key. In the June 8 and 9 attacks, at least thirty-five more people were killed in RSF attacks. Later, Governor Abdelrahman stated that 5,000 families in Kutum alone were in need of humanitarian assistance. By July, more than 90% of the population of Kutum had fled.

== Aftermath ==
By July, the RSF had imposed fees on remaining Kutum residents in exchange for protection from gangs and reprisal attacks. Merchants along the Kutum-El Fasher road were taxed as well. Remaining residents attest that attacks on nearby villages, along with massacres and rapes, continued.

On 28 May 2024, the Sudanese Armed Forces bombed Kutum Hospital, a medical complex for wounded civilians and others in Kutum, Sudan, during the Sudanese civil war, killing and injuring many people. The attack severely damaged the maternity ward, several hospital buildings, and medical equipment, while completely dismantling the hospital's electrical grid.
