= Abu Lulu =

Sudanese military commander and war criminal

- الفاتح عبد الله إدريس; Al-Fateh Abdullah Idris
- Relatives: Hemedti
- Military career
- Allegiance: Rapid Support Forces
- Service years: 2013–
- Rank: Brigadier General
- Nicknames: Abu Lulu; Butcher of El Fasher
- Known for: Participation in the El Fasher massacre
- Conflicts: Yemeni civil war (2014–present); Sudanese civil war (2023–present); Battle of Khartoum; Kordofan campaign; Siege of El Fasher; El Fasher massacre

Al-Fateh Abdullah Idris, (Note: Arabic: الفاتح عبد الله إدريس) better known by his nom-de-guerre Abu Lulu, (Note: Arabic: أبو لولو) and referred to as the Butcher of El Fasher, (Note: Arabic: جزار الفاشر) is a Sudanese military officer in the Rapid Support Forces (RSF) and convicted war criminal who became infamous for posting videos of himself executing civilians during the El Fasher massacre, and other massacres during the Sudanese civil war. He boasted of killing more than 2,000 people in El Fasher, and on 30 October 2025, he was arrested by the RSF. The RSF have since publicly distanced themselves from him, stating Abu Lulu was a leader of an allied militia. However, his arrest has been described as a publicity stunt by the RSF to defuse international ire to the massacre in El Fasher and other RSF atrocities. In May 2026, Reuters reported that Abu Lulu was back in combat.

== Early appearances ==
Abu Lulu joined the RSF in 2013. He first served in the Border Guards, a pro-Bashir militia connected with the RSF that conducted several massacres in Darfur. He reportedly made a name for himself during his time as a fighter in the Border Guards, and was a feared commander by the end of the siege of El Fasher in 2025. Family connections to Hemedti, a fellow member of the Rizeigat tribe, allowed him to be promoted quickly. He served in the Yemeni civil war and later became a guard to Abdul Rahim Dagalo, a brother to Hemedti and deputy leader of the RSF.

His first known killing was during the Battle of Khartoum, during which he was filmed executing two prisoners of war. He then allegedly killed 31 civilians in Omdurman. In al-Khuwair, West Kordofan, he executed more than 16 POWs, with witnesses alleging that his killings were driven by racial hatred. Other RSF fighters described him as moving back and forth within the RSF's territory in Darfur and Khartoum.

== El Fasher massacre ==
During the siege of El Fasher, Abu Lulu confronted a shop owner demanding to know the ethnicity of the man. After learning he was Berti, he killed the man. On October 27, after the fall of the city footage emerged showing a group led by Abu Lulu killing large amounts of civilians in the city. He would often avoid killing victims in a single shot. During a TikTok livestream he boasted of killing more than 2,000 people. Survivors said that Abu Lulu's group had full autonomy before and after the siege, and he would personally stand at checkpoints and shoot fleeing civilians. Dr David Holmes, a criminal psychologist described him as "a narcissistic psychopath", and noted he is different from his accomplices in that he "is proactive in killing unarmed victims".

On 30 October 2025, he was arrested by members of the RSF. A senior RSF member said "He does not belong to the RSF, he leads a group fighting alongside us, but he will be held accountable for his actions. He does not represent the RSF." RSF spokesperson al-Fateh al-Qurashi said Abu Lulu was not a member of the RSF command structure. However rights organizations have said the RSF distancing itself from field commanders is a repeated tactic it has used. Abu Lulu was considered by analysts to be the RSF's scapegoat for the massacres.

On 12 December 2025 Abu Lulu was subjected to sanctions by the United Kingdom, together with Abdul Rahim Dagalo, Gedo Hamdan Ahmed and Tijani Ibrahim Moussa Mohamed. They were sanctioned for their actions in the El Fasher massacre. The men were subjected to travel bans and a freezing of assets. On 29 January 2026 Abu Lulu was also subjected to European Union sanctions. On 19 February 2026 the United States also imposed sanctions on Abu Lulu, Gedo Hamdan Ahmed and Tijani Ibrahim Moussa Mohamed for their actions at El Fasher. They were placed on the Specially Designated Nationals and Blocked Persons List. On 24 February 2026, Abu Lulu and three other senior RSF commanders were also sanctioned by the United Nations on similar charges.

According to Sudanese intelligence officials, Lulu was released and is currently back in combat. Although the RSF themselves had claimed these claims are false and that Lulu remains imprisoned, the claims of his release have been cited by thirteen sources, causing confusion among multiple news sources. In May 2026, Reuters reported that Lulu had returned to the battlefield in Kordofan in March. Amnesty International called on the RSF to immediately recall Lulu and for an investigation to continue into allegations he had committed war crimes.
