= Gedo Hamdan Ahmed =

Sudanese military officer

- Nickname: Abu Shok
- Allegiance: Sudan Rapid Support Forces
- Rank: Lieutenant general
- Conflicts: Sudanese civil war (2023–present); Siege of El Fasher; El Fasher massacre

Gedo Hamdan Ahmed Mohamed, also known as "Abu Shok", is a Sudanese lieutenant general of the Rapid Support Forces (RSF). He serves as commander of the North Darfur section.

== Career ==
In November 2021 Ahmed became RSF commander of the North Darfur section. During his time as commander the Siege of El Fasher took place, which was followed by the El Fasher massacre. He was one of six RSF generals in the city who was filmed after the fall of the city on 26 October 2025. At one point he was next to RSF deputy commander Abdul Rahim Dagalo. Ahmed was filmed at an abandoned Sudanese Armed Forces base.

== Sanctions ==
On 12 December 2025 the United Kingdom imposed sanctions on Ahmed, Abdul Rahim Dagalo, Al-Fateh Abdullah Idris and Tijani Ibrahim Moussa Mohamed for their roles in the El Fasher massacre. On 29 January 2026 European Union imposed sanctions on Ahmed and six others. On 19 February 2026 the United States also imposed sanctions on Ahmed, Idris and Mohamed for their actions at El Fasher. They were placed on the Specially Designated Nationals and Blocked Persons List. On 24 February 2026 the United Nations Security Council committee established under United Nations Security Council Resolution 1591 added Ahmed, Dagalo, Idris and Mohamed to the sanctions regime.
