= Edris Kafuti =

Edris Kafuti is a Sudanese field commander of the Rapid Support Forces.

In November 2025 the Centre for Information Resilience determined that Kafuti was present at killing sites of the El Fasher massacre. Together with Tijani Ibrahim Moussa Mohamed he was also determined to be at a site addressing detained individuals. On 29 January 2026 the European Union (EU) imposed sanctions on Kafuti and six others. The EU found him a "key perpetrator of the atrocities" during the El Fasher events and specifically that he harassed detained individuals. On 19 February 2026 Switzerland follow suit with sanctions against Kafuti and the six others.
