= Turncoat =

Person who shifts allegiance

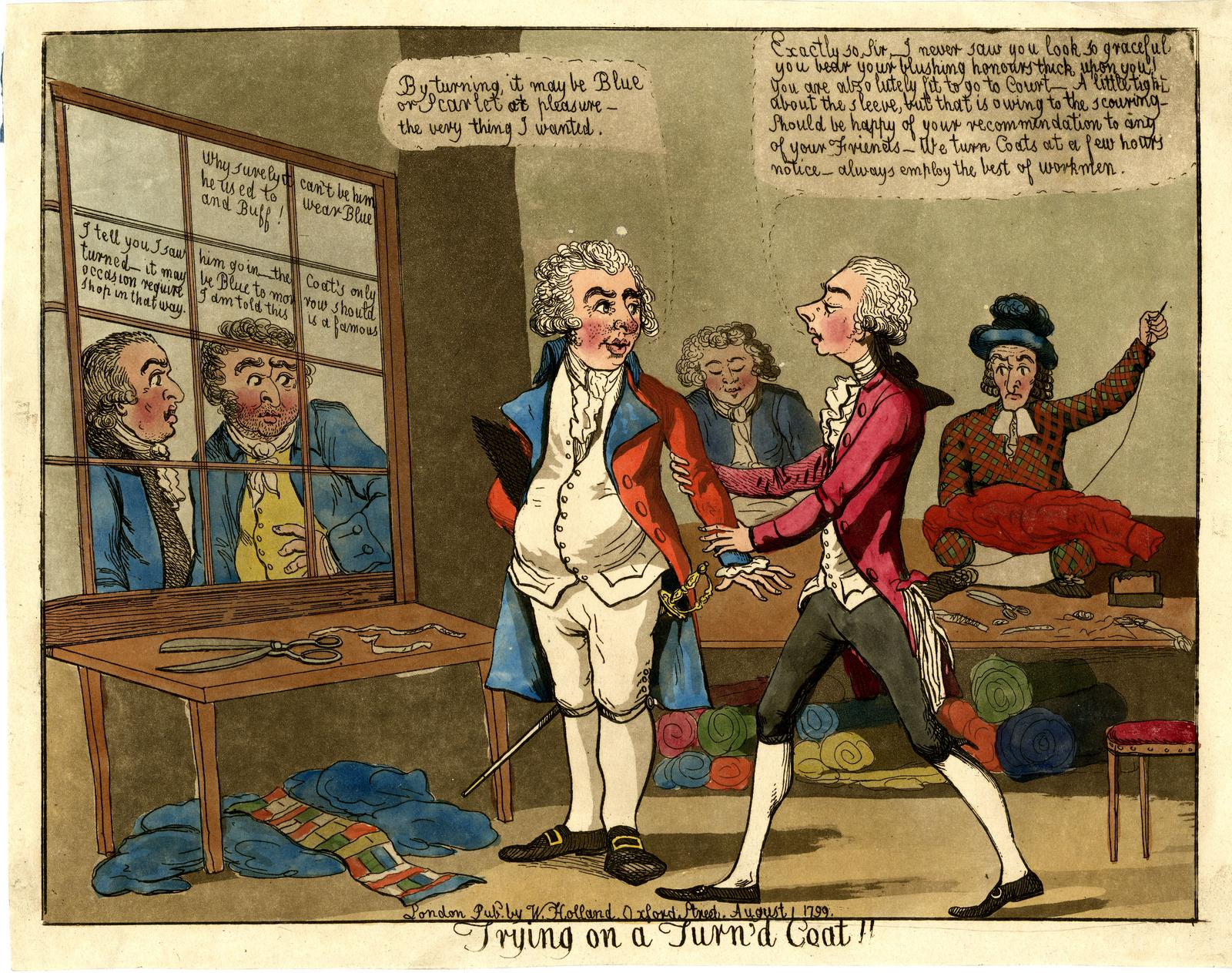
”Trying on a turn'd coat!!” depicting William Pitt the Younger and Richard Brinsley Sheridan. Pitt turned from Whig (in opposition), to government – with Tories

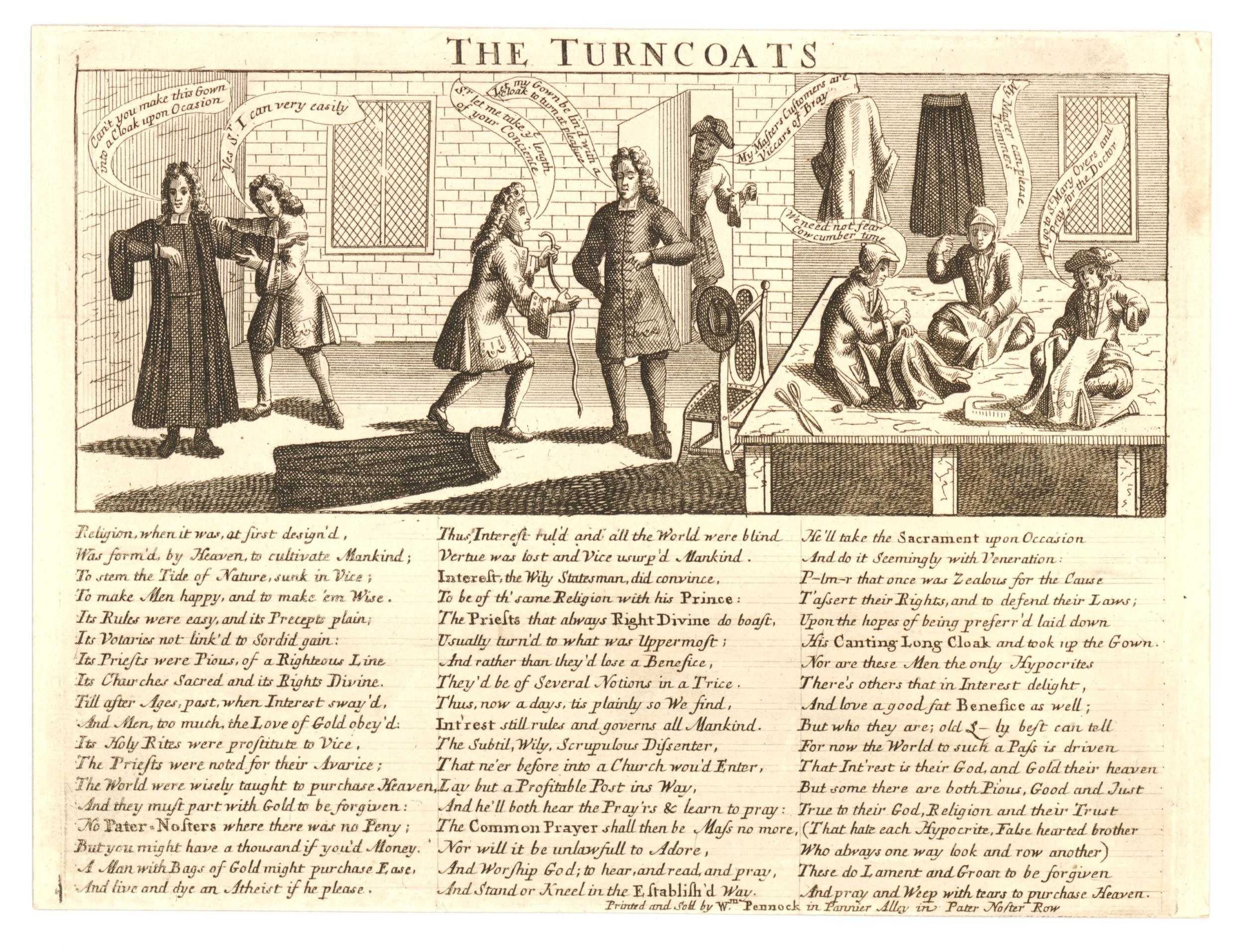
The Turncoats – an illustration relating broadly to the Bangorian Controversy

A turncoat is a person who shifts allegiance from one loyalty or ideal to another, betraying or deserting an original cause by switching to the opposing side or party. In political and social history, this is distinct from being a traitor, as the switch mostly takes place under the following circumstances:

- In groups, often driven by one or more leaders.
- When the goal that formerly motivated and benefited the person becomes (or is perceived as having become) either no longer feasible or too costly even if success is achieved.
- Remaining an active participant, usually on the same basis, e.g. combatant or politician as opposed to surrender or ceasing activity as a defector.
- Ostensibly open and honestly intentioned for a cause, as opposed to material personal gain or espionage of treachery.

From a military perspective, medieval armies generally wore uniforms of contrasting colors to prevent incidents of friendly fire. Thus the term "turn-coat" indicates that an individual has changed sides and his uniform coat to one matching the color of his former enemy.

== Historical context ==
Even in a modern historical context "turncoat" is often synonymous with the term "renegade", a term of religious origins having its origins in the Latin word "renegare" (to deny). Historical currents of great magnitude have periodically caught masses of people, along with their leaders, in their wake. In such a dire situation, new perspectives on past actions are laid bare and the question of personal treason becomes muddled. One example would be the situation that led to the Act of Abjuration or Plakkaat van Verlatinghe, signed on July 26, 1581, in the Netherlands, an instance where changing sides was given a positive meaning.

The first written use of the term meaning was by J. Foxe in Actes & Monuments in 1570: "One who changes his principles or party; a renegade; an apostate." Cited 1571*

"Turncoat" could also have a more literal origin. According to the Rotuli Chartarum 1199–1216 two barons changed fealty from William Marshal, 1st Earl of Pembroke, to King John. In other words, they turned their coats (of arms) from one lord to another, hence turncoat.

== Process ==
The term is often used in the context of military or political conflict. Turncoats may be driven by necessity or force in regime changes, personal motives such as connections with members of the other party, or individual moral or intellectual development or interest.

Turncoats may face additional scrutiny or skepticism after defection from their new allies due to stigma against turncoats and their perceived untrustworthiness or due to their identity (e.g. their race or born nationality). In certain countries, individuals and organizations have actively investigated turncoats for crimes of defection, treason, or other charges.

== Examples ==
There were many turncoats in history, including:

- Tostig Godwinson at the Battle of Stamford Bridge fought alongside Harald Hardrada against Godwinson's own brother, the king.
- John Balliol earned the epithet Toom Tabard (Empty Coat).
- Robert the Bruce was depicted as such prior to his success at the Battle of Bannockburn.
- Thomas Stanley, 1st Earl of Derby betrayed Richard III at the Battle of Bosworth.
- The English Civil War during the 17th century. The siege of Corfe Castle was won by Oliver Cromwell's soldiers when they turned their coats inside out to match the colors of the Royal army. This was only a wartime deception and the Parliamentarians had turned their coats literally but not really turned from their cause at all.
- The most notable case of a turnocat in American history was with decorated Continental Army Major General Benedict Arnold, who defected to the side of the British in September 1780 after a plot involving him and British major John André to surrender West Point was exposed.
- Canada during the War of 1812. Some Canadians felt republicanism was a better system of government than the constitutional British monarchy and fought on the side of the invading Americans.
- Germany and Austria after World War II when many former enthusiastic members of the Nazi Party embraced the newly created nations of West Germany or East Germany and sought to erase or at least minimize their former role as Nazis. During the decades that followed, many former Nazis regained prestige and held high posts in the new republics. Kurt Waldheim, an Austrian Nazi who served as a Wehrmacht intelligence officer in occupied Yugoslavia during the war, even held the highest post as Secretary-General of the United Nations from 1972 to 1981 and as President of Austria from 1986 to 1992.
- Russia and the former Communist Eastern European countries after the fall of the USSR, where many former communists suddenly became fervent supporters of capitalism. As a result, many former apparatchiks abandoned the Communist Party in favor of positions in the new government structures.
- In Spain after the Spanish Civil War (1936–1939) with former Republicans, and again during the Spanish transition to democracy with former Nationalists.
- In Syria following the fall of the Assad regime in December 2024, many of his supporters turned against him and began voicing support for the Syrian revolution. Just days before his escape, many were calling for bombs to be dropped on rebel-controlled areas.
- In 2026 amidst the Third Sudanese Civil War, RSF general Al-Nour al-Qubba defected to The Sudanese Armed Forces.

== See also ==
- Abjuration
- Benedict Arnold a general who originally fought for the American Continental Army but defected to the British Army
- Collaboration with the Axis Powers during World War II
- Cover-up
- Craig Counsell
- Defection
- Dual loyalty in politics
- Flip-flop (politics)
- Historical revisionism (negationism), falsification of history
- History of the Soviet Union (1982–1991)
  - Dissolution of the Soviet Union
- Jacques Dutronc whose song L'opportuniste is about being a turncoat
- List of former Nazi Party members
- Nazi hunter
- Pursuit of Nazi collaborators
- Quisling
- Whitewash (censorship)
- Aaya Ram Gaya Ram
