= Khalda Saber =

South Sudan teacher and activist

- Born: South Sudan
- Citizenship: Sudan
- Occupations: Teacher, Activist

Khalda Saber is a Sudanese teacher and an activist who worked with a local NGO on women's rights issues. She was one of the women who led protests against the 30 years rule of President Omar al-Bashir which led to military takeover of the government. Saber encouraged fellow teachers and women she met on the streets in the city of Port Sudan while walking to the school where she taught to join the pro-democracy uprising. “I was telling them that there is nothing to lose, compared with what we have already lost. I was telling them that we have to take to the streets, demonstrate and express our rejection to what's happening,”.

== Arrest ==
Two months into the protest, Saber was rounded up on a bus by plainclothes security agents and was taken to the notorious security and intelligence agency's local office. For 40 days she remained in detention along with thousands of other women who led protests against al-Bashir in a newly built wing in a prison in the capital, Khartoum.

== Exile ==
Following her release from detention, she joined a sit-in outside the military's headquarters in Khartoum in another demonstration. She received threats to life and family from Rapid Support Forces (RSF) a paramilitary group which is a breakaway faction of Janjaweed militias that had been used in the conflict in Sudan's Darfur region by al-Bashir. Saber fled the country along with her husband and two daughters to Cairo, Egypt in a self-exile two days after al-Bashir was toppled by the military. Saber documented the RSF's human rights violations, especially against women, through testimonies before and during the uprising.
