= Siege of El Fasher =

Military engagement in Sudan (2024–2025)

- Part of the Darfur campaign of the Sudanese civil war (2023–present)
- Map of the siege and fall of El Fasher
Date	13 April 2023 – 26 October 2025 (2 years, 6 months, 1 week and 6 days) (Note: 1st phase: 13–20 April 2023 (7 days) 2nd phase: 12–29 May 2023 (17 days, ceasefire) 3rd phase: 18 August 2023 – 13 April 2024 (7 months, 3 weeks, 5 days) 4th phase (offensive): 13 April 2024 – 26 October 2025 (1 year, 6 months, 2 weeks))
Location	El Fasher, North Darfur, Sudan
Result	RSF victory; El Fasher is captured by the Rapid Support Forces; The beginning of the El Fasher massacre; SAF's 6th Infantry Division retreat westward
Territorial changes	El Fasher and surrounding villages fall under total RSF control

Belligerents
Sudanese government; Sudanese Armed Forces; 6th Infantry Division; SLM (Tambour) (from August 2023); SLM (Minnawi); JEM; Darfur Joint Protection Force; Sudanese Alliance; Gathering of Sudan Liberation Forces; Sudan Liberation Movement – El Foka; Sudan Justice and Equality Forces: Liberated Areas; SLM (al-Nur)	(Sudan) Government of Peace and Unity (from April 2025); Rapid Support Forces; (Central African Republic) Coalition of Patriots for Change (since June 2024); FPRC; MPC

Commanders and leaders
Asia Al-Khalifa; Nimir Mohammed Abdelrahman (until December 2023); Minni Minawi; Babikir Musa †; Abbas Minnawi †; Gibril Ibrahim El Sadig El Foka Abdul Wahid al-Nur	Ali Yaqoub Gibril †; Nimir Mohammed Abdelrahman (after December 2023); Abdul Rahman Qarn Shata †; Abu Al Qasim-Ali Musa †; Osman Mohamed Hamid Mohamed; Ibrahim Delib †; Hamida Abbas †; Abu Lulu; Al-Nour al-Qubba; Abdul Rahim Dagalo

Units involved
6th Infantry Division	Unknown

Casualties and losses
SAF claim: 8,600 killed 2,400 wounded 3,000+ deserted RSF claim: 1 Antonov An-26 destroyed	SAF claim: 95+ killed Dozens wounded 80 vehicles destroyed 10 vehicles captured 126 drones destroyed JDF claim: 15,470 killed (including mercenaries from Colombia, Libya, Chad); Several commanders killed 25 vehicles destroyed 30 vehicles captured
- 782+ civilians killed, 1,143+ injured (May 2024); 60,000+ displaced 14,000+ civilians killed (October 2025)(from bombing, starvation and extrajudicial executions) 60,000+ civilians executed following the battle

The Siege of El Fasher was the 30-month siege of the Sudanese city of El Fasher, North Darfur by the Rapid Support Forces (RSF), as part of the Sudanese civil war. It was preceded by a series of battles for control between the RSF and the Sudanese Armed Forces (SAF), during which the city became the last stronghold of the SAF in Darfur. In late October, after over 2 years of siege the city was overrun by the Rapid Support Forces which killed tens of thousands in the ensuing El Fasher massacre.

The first battle for the city took place between 13 and 20 April 2023, and resulted in ceasefire that held until 12 May. Clashes broke out again between 12 and 29 May, and ended with a more stable ceasefire that lasted until August. By September, the city had become a haven for refugees across the region, without enough food and water.

In February 2024, the United Nations mission completed its withdrawal from Sudan. From late 2024 to April 2025, the Rapid Support Forces launched attacks on Abu Shouk and Zamzam IDP camps surrounding El Fasher, killing hundreds of civilians. Indiscriminate bombings of civilian sites in the city occurred in the summer and fall of 2025, and throughout August 2025 the RSF began building a wall to surround the city and the Sudanese Armed Forces inside. On 19 September, the RSF bombed Al Jamia Mosque during Friday prayer.

The RSF seized full control of El Fasher district on 26 October 2025 after the retreat of the 6th Infantry Division. In the immediate aftermath, RSF militants carried out the El Fasher massacre, indiscriminately attacking and slaughtering civilians in mass murders that occurred in and around the city. Several thousand civilians fled to Tawila. As of 1 November, massacres are believed to be continuing.

== Background ==
=== War in Darfur ===
In 2003, rebel movements in Southern Sudan, the predominantly non-Arab Justice and Equality Movement and Sudan People's Liberation Movement launched attacks against Sudanese Army bases and their allies, the predominantly Arab Janjaweed militia. JEM and SPLM launched the attacks in opposition to dictator Omar al-Bashir, who promptly declared war against the militias. Since 2003, the war has killed hundreds of thousands of people, and displaced many more.

For most of the war in Darfur, El Fasher was controlled by the Sudanese Armed Forces and Janjaweed, although rebels held positions in the remote Jebel Marrah. The city was often a place of negotiations, with meetings taking place in 2010 and the Doha Document for Peace in Darfur being signed there in 2013. Despite this, fighting still occurred occasionally in the city, between rebels, UNAMID, the Sudanese Army, and the Janjaweed.

The war in Darfur ended after the Sudanese Revolution ousted al-Bashir in 2020, and warring parties signed the Juba Peace Agreement. Clashes continued sporadically, and looting, raids, and battles stemming from property or ethnic disputes continued in August 2021. In these attacks, dozens of people were killed, and North Darfuri security forces and the Sudanese Army were often unable to stabilize the situation. In December 2021, looting and violence occurred around the former United Nations base in the town, that was used logistically by UNAMID.

In March 2023, tribal clashes continued, with four people killed due to infighting in the Bani Hussein tribe.

=== Political tensions and beginning of the conflict ===
Following the Sudanese revolution, Nimir Mohammed Abdelrahman was appointed governor, and Mohammed Hassan Arabi was dismissed. In Khartoum, the Sudanese capital, many Janjaweed enlisted into the Rapid Support Forces led by Hemedti, a paramilitary affiliated with the Sudanese Army founded in 2013. Civilian-administration leader Abdalla Hamdok was overthrown in 2021 by Abdel Fattah al-Burhan, the transitional military leader, with the aid of the RSF. By early 2023, tensions grew between Hemedti and Burhan over the integration of the RSF into the Sudanese Army, as the integration would heavily decrease RSF's independence and effectiveness. These tensions came to a head on 15 April, when RSF soldiers attacked SAF positions in Khartoum and Merowe.

== Battle ==
=== 2023 ===
==== First battle (15–20 April) ====
Clashes erupted in El Fasher on 15 April, like many other cities across Sudan. The RSF claimed to have captured the El Fasher airport and several military sites in the city by 16 April, but this was unverifiable at the time. Twenty-seven people were injured in the first battles according to Chinese state media, and there were reports of casualties. By 17 April, hospitals in the city were receiving an overflow of patients, and most victims were being transferred to the police hospital. Deadly attacks took place in El Jama neighborhood as well. In Abu Shouk refugee camp and El Fasher, 11 people were killed and 90 were injured. In response, Governor Abdelrahman announced the creation of a burial committee to quell the clashes. Electricity was cut off in the city, and the main market and livestock market were both destroyed. The airport was closed as well. Civilians in El Fasher reported that RSF forces controlled El Manhal camp and el-Ghaba neighborhood, while SAF controlled the General Command headquarters and neighborhoods around El Manhal and El Ghaba.

Reports surfaced on 18 April that 31 Indian citizens were stranded in El Fasher, prompting the Indian government to launch Operation Kaveri. Médecins Sans Frontières reported that 136 injured people were brought to their facilities in El Fasher, although it was becoming increasingly more difficult to treat them. The organization also claimed many of the wounded are civilians hit by stray bullets. Some civilians in the area, speaking to Al Jazeera, claimed that while both SAF and RSF forces took casualties, RSF had taken more. The witness also stated dozens of bodies were on the streets, unable to be picked up. One Indian citizen was killed by a stray bullet. MSF also claimed that by 21 April, over 44 people had been killed and 279 wounded. The Sudan Doctors' Syndicate reported nine killed and 36 injured in the city at their hospitals. Both MSF and the SDS claimed there were not enough supplies to last three weeks.

A series of hospitals were looted in the city, including the pediatric hospital. The Abu Shouk camp, home to over 100,000 displaced people, was burnt to the ground by late April, along with the main market in El Fasher. Satellite images also revealed tanks and unknown forces residing in residential areas.

==== Ceasefire in effect (20 April – 12 May) ====
On 20 April, RSF and SAF commanders in El Fasher agreed to a three-day ceasefire, brokered by the civilian Good Offices Committee. In the ceasefire, SAF would hold positions west of the city, and RSF would hold ones in the east, while the center of El Fasher would become demilitarized, only patrolled by police. Neighborhoods and international organization headquarters would become entrusted to rebel movements such as the remnants of JEM and SLA, both signatories of the Juba Peace Agreement. The truce was extended to be indefinite on 23 April.

The day of 24 April was calm, except for some small clashes in the north of the city. While civilian life returned to normal, prices and inflation skyrocketed, and goods were still scarce. The Um Defsoa market, one of the city's main markets, returned to normal, although the Jebel Marra market and Kutum markets were both too burnt to operate. The next day, prisoners from Shala Prison were released, except those with the death penalty, by an Arab militia. Some robberies took place on 24 April, killing four people total. The North Darfur Ministry of Health released a statement on 28 April stating 62 civilians were killed, including 13 children, and over 282 others were injured as a result of the clashes.

While the Abdelsalam Centre Hospital was able to reopen during the truce, the South Hospital was still in a dire situation. All hospitals were then able to reopen in the following days. By 4 May, Operation Kaveri had successfully ended, and the Indian government extracted all Indian nationals from the city. Minni Minnawi, governor of West Darfur, brought his troops back to El Fasher on 9 May after negotiations failed in Khartoum.

==== Sporadic clashes resume (12–29 May) ====
On 12 May, the ceasefire fell apart, and clashes renewed in El Fasher. RSF came under control of several neighborhoods, and in the center of the city, looting and extrajudicial killings became prevalent as money ran out and banks closed. On 14 May, groups and signatories of the Juba Agreement, along with all five governors of the Darfur states, created a "Joint Darfur Force" deploying troops in the city to hold the truce. The battle has had affected aid from getting to civilians. Clashes broke out again on 22 May, with shelling taking place in the eastern neighborhoods under control of the RSF. The clashes took place not long after the Joint Darfur Force returned to Khartoum. The battles died down over the next two days, as a nationwide ceasefire was set to come in effect. They restarted on 25 May in the same areas.

By 29 May, several parts of the city were either destroyed or burned. By 26 May, all roads to the main market in El Fasher were closed, and by 29 May, it had been destroyed. Renewed RSF attacks on the northern neighborhoods of El Fasher destroyed several buildings at the El Fasher University. Clashes also took place in Abu Shouk camp. The shelling on 29 May killed three civilians and injured 27 others. On 30 May, Minnawi called on civilians in El Fasher to pick up weapons against the RSF. By 1 June, El Fasher was relatively calm. The RSF had been forced to withdraw from several areas in the eastern neighborhoods, but still controlled much of them. Governor Nimir Abdelrahman stated that the Committee of Mediators and Elders and the Good Offices Committee had negotiated a ceasefire between the two sides.

==== Ceasefire and sporadic skirmishes (30 May – 26 October) ====
Despite the renewed peace after 29 May, facilities in the city were damaged during the battle. Hospitals, power, and communications were all down in the city, and fuel prices were exorbitantly high. An influx of refugees made their way to El Fasher from Tawila, Kutum and the Kassab refugee camp, which the RSF captured in early June. On 7 June, a commander of the SAF's 6th division defected to the RSF. El Fasher was quiet for most of June, although reinforcements were being brought in from both sides in late June. On 22 June, a skirmish between the RSF and SAF killed one person and injured seven others. Repeated armed robberies forced the El Fasher livestock market to close on 27 June. Sexual violence and rape cases also skyrocketed amidst the ceasefire, especially in Zamzam camp. Governor Abdelrahman in late June also lauded efforts by the Committee of Mediators and Elders for holding up the ceasefire in El Fasher, and facilitating the arrival of refugees from Kutum and Tawila.

By July, the SAF were in full control of El Fasher, and most markets and public places were closed. The city is dependent on aid from Khartoum, and roads in and out of the city were partially blocked, with armed gangs and robberies prevalent. The South Hospital in El Fasher was running on meager supplies. The livestock market in El Fasher was also completely out of livestock, destabilizing the already fragile economy. As a result of the crippled economy, banditry became common in El Fasher, including on the houses of important officials. Flooding in July exacerbated the poverty in El Fasher, as workers attempting to fix a power station in RSF-controlled territory were intimidated by RSF forces. Despite the situation and heavy flooding, around 600,000 refugees still sought refuge in El Fasher due to the lull in fighting. By September, much of El Fasher had little to no access to water.

On 18 August, clashes broke out again in the eastern part of the city, the first time since 30 May. The renewed clashes broke out between the RSF and the Sudan Liberation Movement – El Foka, under the control of El Sadig El Foka. Several civilians were injured in indiscriminate shelling from SLM-El Foka. The Joint Darfur Force stayed relatively silent on the outbreak in clashes, declaring they would only protect the road connecting El Fasher to Kufra, Libya. By 19 August, the clashes had dispersed. An 23 August skirmish at the Um Defesu market in El Fasher between policemen and "rebel fighters" injured four rebels.

By late August, the northern and eastern parts of the city were controlled by the RSF, and the southern SAF-controlled neighborhoods hosted most of the refugees. The RSF-controlled neighborhoods, in particular El Tadamon, also faced a severe humanitarian crisis, with no drinkable water and little to no facilities. In the battles on 23 August, many SAF soldiers were wounded. On 5 September, a man was shot in El Fasher by unknown gunmen. The city was otherwise largely calm, except for an attempted break-in into the Grand Market by RSF militants that was stopped by the JDF. Fighting broke out between the SAF and RSF on 10 September, lasting for six hours around the base of the 6th division. 190 families living in the North Hilla and Ziyadia neighborhoods surrounding the base were displaced, and thirty people were killed and forty-two others were wounded.

During the rainy season in September, thousands of refugees who fled to El Fasher fled to territory controlled by Sudan Liberation Army – Abdelwahid el-Nur, including the Jebel Marra mountains and surrounding towns. Refugees from Kalma camp in El Fasher lost everything as their homes were flooded. Many of the hospitals in the El Fasher area saw a spike in malaria and dengue fever outbreaks, due to a lack of drinkable water and the rains. The health facilities in the city, worn down by the battles, struggled to keep up with the cases. The El Fasher Teaching Hospital was forced to close due to the 11 September clash, and was being used as a military barracks. Despite this, RSF militants continued raids on civilian homes in the city.

==== Tensions for a larger battle (26 October–November) ====
The RSF launched a massive attack on the 6th Infantry Division in El Fasher on 26 October, the same day they captured Nyala and Zalingei. Both the SAF and RSF gave conflicting accounts of the battle, with the former claiming to have repelled the attack and the latter claiming to have captured the entirety of the base. The El Fasher Resistance Committee stated one person was killed and several others were injured. This toll later rose to at least ten killed and forty-two others injured. This fighting continued on 31 October, with several houses being damaged. Governors Abdelrahman and Minnawi both called on the RSF and SAF to prevent large-scale fighting in the city on 1 November as well, as the fall of Nyala and Zalingei made El Fasher the last non-RSF controlled city in Darfur, and therefore a target for the RSF. The United States released a statement echoing Minnawi and Abdelrahman's.

One person was killed in renewed fighting in the city on 2 November, and a new spate of refugees from the north fled to the southern part of the city. As the markets were closed since the beginning of the renewed clashes, many families were left without food. On 6 November, Babikir Musa, a senior commander in Minnawi's faction of SLA was killed in the village of Shaqra while defending it from the RSF. Two others were injured as well. Fighting largely ended on 8 November. Abdel Rahman Jumma, the RSF commander who captured El Geneina, called on the RSF to capture El Fasher as well, exacerbating tensions. Along with this, El Fasher residents accused Minnawi of only protecting Zaghawa-majority neighborhoods in the city, of which he is a member.

By mid-November, rumors spread of the RSF massing troops outside the city in preparation for an offensive. Civilians were extremely nervous in fear of an attack. In defense of the city, SLM – el-Nur and the Sudan Justice and Equality Forces arrived in the city to meet with El Sadig El Foka, the commander of his faction of the SLM, and members of the JDF in coordination with stopping an RSF attack. Justice and Equality Movement leader Gibril Ibrahim and SLA-Tambour commander Mustafa Tambour had earlier stated their plan to back the JDF in case of an RSF attack. SLM – el-Nur released a statement stating that this backing was not in defense of the Sudanese Army, instead of the JDF.

Despite the loose alliance between almost all rebel groups, RSF commander Abdelrahim Dagalo expressed intent to capture El Fasher. Analysts stated that an RSF attack on El Fasher would cause an ethnic conflict between the Arab tribes and Zaghawa militias. GSLF forces amassed more troops in the town with the JDF in early December, despite commander el-Tahir Hajar's insistence on neutrality. Leader of the SLM-Transitional Council, El Hadi Idris, stated that his group began talks in November with the RSF over preventing an attack in the city, with the latter claiming that the only way to prevent an attack was the insistence of the JDF's neutrality in the conflict.

By December 2023, the United Nations was preparing to withdraw its political mission from Sudan. Nathaniel Raymond, a UN human rights investigator, said "if El Fasher falls, the RSF will be able to complete the genocide begun by the Janjaweed through ethnic cleansing of those they have not displaced or killed so far".

=== 2024 ===
==== Pre-siege phase (January–April) ====
In the early months of 2024, combat around El Fasher shifted from sporadic skirmishes to deliberate operations aimed at isolating the city. The combined defence force inside El Fasher comprising the Sudan Liberation Movement, the Sudan Liberation Army Movement (Minnawi faction), and allied local Takushat militias organised its defence into four main sectors (west, south, north, east) as it faced increasing pressure from the RSF. The RSF intensified its artillery bombardment of peripheral zones, including displacement camps such as Zamzam camp, and infiltrated terrain surrounding the city to restrict SAF resupply and leverage tribal mobilisations.

On 24 January, armed clashes occurred between the SAF and RSF in the vicinity of the Abu Shouk camp for internally displaced persons. The fighting began in the Abuja IDP camp market and spread toward the Abu Shouk camp east of El Fasher; eight people were wounded and dozens of displaced civilians fled into the city as the SAF sent reinforcements into the area. On 2 February, a new wave of clashes erupted in the northern and eastern neighbourhoods of the city: the shelling of the “Dim Silk” neighbourhood and the Al-Qubba area left at least five civilians dead and more than 18 wounded, and many residents from Abu Shouk and adjacent areas fled southward toward temporary shelter centres.

Fighting escalated further in April when the RSF launched tailored attacks on the approaches to El Fasher, especially the northern routes. These operations included sustained shelling, drone reconnaissance, and the rapid seizure of key nodes such as the town of Mellon (Mellit) that enabled the RSF to cut off major supply lines into the city. It is reported that these engagements inflicted significant losses on SAF-aligned forces and local camp-militias, effectively compressing the city's defensive perimeter. Displacement-tracking data show that from 1 to 16 April more than 40,000 people (about 8,100 households) were forced from areas around El Fasher as clashes intensified in the locality.

== Siege ==
=== 2024 ===
==== Dismantling local food production (March-June) ====
In March 2026, The Guardian reported that researchers at Yale's Humanitarian Research Lab had identified 41 farming communities in North Darfur that were attacked between March and June 2024. The Yale report described the RSF's systematic destruction of farming communities, livestock enclosures, and the residents of agrarian villages that had been an important food source for El Fasher. Over the 10-week period examined, the RSF attacked 41 rural farming communities, in some cases more than once, across some of Darfur's most fertile land. The attacks appeared aimed at dismantling local food production before the RSF siege of El Fasher. Legal experts cited by The Guardian argued that the pattern of village destruction, damage to farming infrastructure and livestock enclosures, and the displacement of farmers provided strong evidence that the RSF had used starvation as a method of warfare.

==== Encirclement (May–December) ====
By 2 May, reports indicated that El Fasher in North Darfur was effectively surrounded by RSF, with safe exit routes cut and civilian movement severely restricted. The blockade coincided with escalating shelling of peripheral neighbourhoods and displacement camps such as Abu Shouk camp and Zamzam camp, signalling a shift from outer-skirmishes to systematic encirclement.

On 10 May a surprise offensive by the SAF and allied armed movements targeted RSF positions around El Fasher, striking locations such as Al-Manhal School, Al-Borsa and the Al-Kahraba neighbourhood in the city.

In the afternoon of 21 May, artillery bombardment by the RSF struck residential neighbourhoods including Al-Qubba, Tambasi, Makkarka and Hay Al-Salam, as well as the displacement camp of Abu Shouk camp. According to hospital sources at the southern hospital in El Fasher, at least ten civilians were killed that day, and dozens wounded. The shelling reportedly came from RSF-held positions in the northern and eastern sectors of the city, and targeted both dwellings and a shelter centre at Salam School 14 where a woman and child were injured.

On 14 June, a large offensive erupted in the Um-Baar area northwest of the city, where the RSF were subjected to a coordinated attack by a joint force of armed movements. The joint force struck RSF positions, inflicted heavy losses, destroyed several military vehicles, and forced RSF reinforcements to arrive from Al-Zarq and Wadi Hour. The assault marked an escalation as the armed movements attempted to break the RSF's outer encirclement ring around the city.

On 27 June, RSF artillery fire hit residential districts in El Fasher, including Timbasi Model Primary School for Girls, and a shell in the grand market area killed a university professor. Four displaced persons from one family were killed, and around 28 people wounded, as civilians sought escape to Zamzam camp. The city's internal conditions deteriorated as shell fire, displacement, and transport paralysis combined to degrade civilian and military resilience.

On 21 November, as the siege tightened, the SAF changed tactics in response to mounting RSF pressure. In one operation the SAF withdrew from exposed bases in the southeastern sector of El Fasher and conducted ambushes by drawing RSF columns into prepared kill zones. The RSF meanwhile accelerated reinforcement efforts from across Darfur, signalling its intent to mount a decisive thrust into the city. By this stage, the battle-space had expanded so that “all axes of El Fasher are now open battlefield”.

By early December the RSF was reported to be mobilising new fighters from Central, South and North Darfur toward the city, including alleged recruitment of foreign mercenaries and a force of 200 fighters preparing for transfer into El Fasher. The deployment was part of the RSF's operational strategy to reinforce its outer ring, intensify pressure on the SAF 6th Infantry Division base, and aim for a final collapse of city defence.

=== 2025 ===
==== Ultimatum and subsequent escalation (January–July) ====
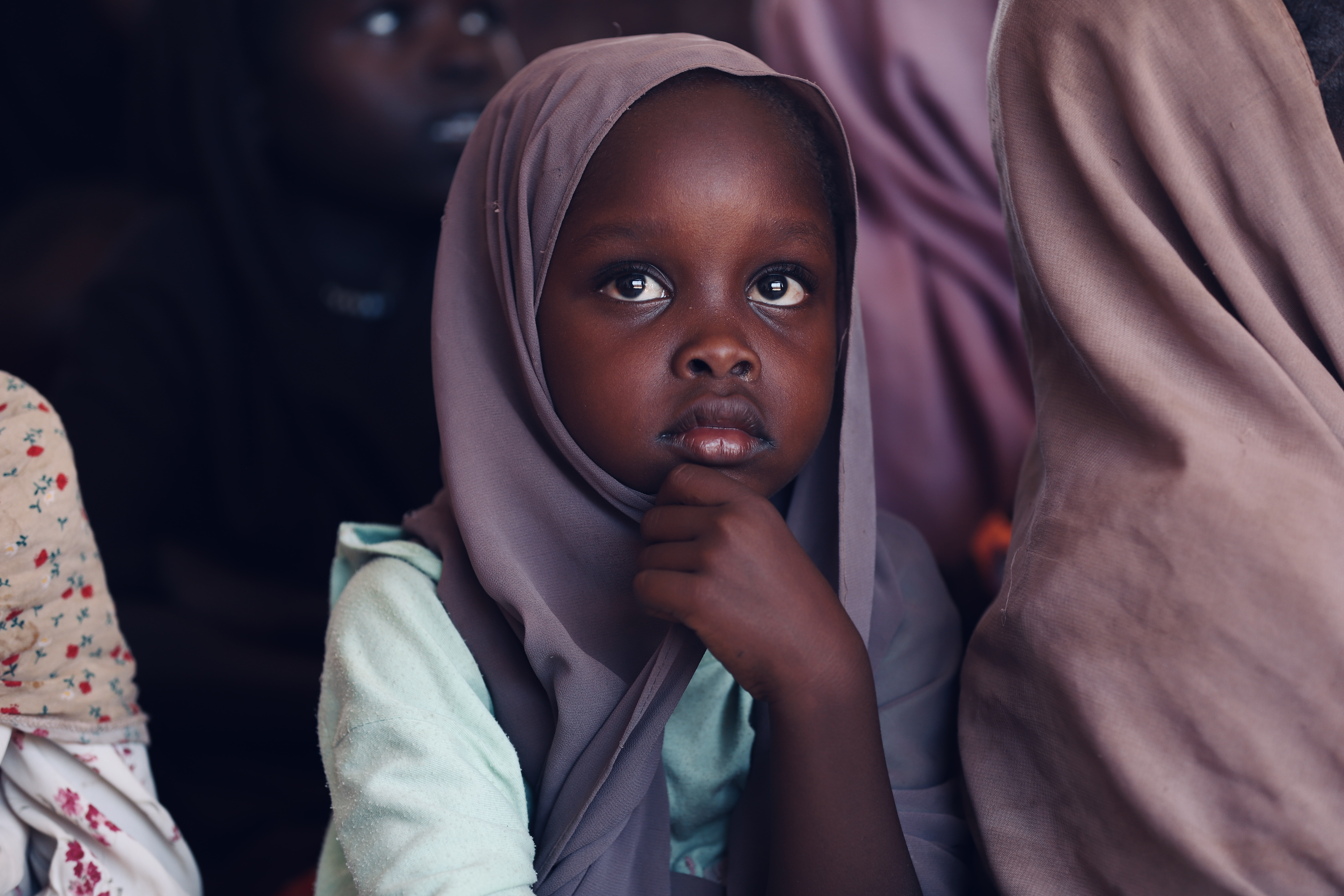
A child in Tawila displaced persons camp

On 12 January 2025, renewed artillery exchanges erupted in the western sector of El Fasher, where the SAF and the RSF clashed in the neighbourhood of Abu Shouk camp, resulting in at least three deaths (including a woman) and multiple injuries among civilians. The shelling was reportedly triggered by SAF-led attacks on RSF positions east of the city, which prompted RSF retaliatory fire into residential zones.

The RSF then issued a 48-hour ultimatum on 21 January for the SAF and allied units to withdraw from El Fasher, while simultaneously conducting heavy artillery bombardments of civilian infrastructure and displacement-camp neighbourhoods. From 24 January the clashes became more overt: armed confrontations erupted in the Abuja IDP camp market, just east of the city, spreading into the nearby Abu Shouk camp and adjacent suburbs. Eight individuals were wounded as the SAF dispatched reinforcements into the area to stem the RSF advance. On the same day, the RSF launched a devastating drone strike on the Saudi Teaching Maternal Hospital in El Fasher. The attack struck during its busiest hours, when wards were filled with patients, medical staff, mothers and newborns. According to the WHO, at least 70 people were killed and dozens of others wounded as the facility, widely regarded as the last hospital in the city with full surgical capacity, was reduced to devastation.

The strike left the hospital's emergency and surgical departments destroyed, ambulances inoperable, and medical staff forced to perform operations under makeshift conditions in damaged wards. The ministry of foreign affairs of Saudi Arabia condemned the attack as a “blatant violation of international humanitarian law,” and the United Nations issued a statement calling the assault “a shocking violation and affront to humanity.”

Around 25 January, RSF assault operations spread into villages west and north of El Fasher. One key engagement in the “Broush” area, 17 km east of Um‑Kadada, saw over 80 reported killed among local resistance and civilians when RSF forces swept through the zone. Simultaneously, widespread displacement was recorded: some 3,960 households were uprooted from villages in the El Fasher locality during this period.

By mid February 2025, the siege of El Fasher was now in its ninth consecutive month, and civilians were facing dramatic economic and humanitarian collapse. Food-prices for staples such as lentils, sugar, onions, flour and oil had surged sharply (e.g., a 25 kg sack of lentils rose from 140,000 SDG to 160,000 SDG, sugar from 280,000 to 310,000, and a 36-pound container of oil from 75,000 to 110,000). The blockade, particularly from the western side (Tawila, Kabkabiya, Tina routes), had cut off most supply-routes; storehouses were reportedly “completely empty”. Alongside this economic suffocation, the displacement-camp markets (notably in the Abu Shouk camp) were partially closed after relentless artillery shelling, and humanitarian access remained severely curtailed.

In March the military situation shifted further. On 2 March, reinforcements arrived for the joint force of the army and allied armed movements in North Darfur, particularly in the Al Malha–Mellit axis (210 km northeast of El Fasher). Four-wheel drive combat vehicles were seen arriving, indicating that SAF and allies were preparing for operations aimed at easing the blockade or countering the besiegers. Meanwhile, the RSF strengthened its positions and deployed snipers around Mellit, a town 65 km north of El Fasher, consolidating the outer ring of the siege.

By June the combat tempo increased significantly. On 15 June, RSF forces launched early-morning artillery barrages from the north and northeast of El Fasher followed by a ground assault; drones were reported flying intensively during the fighting. The SAF and allied units held parts of the city centre and northern/western neighbourhoods, but the eastern and southern sectors were under RSF pressure. On 23 June, 253 families were reported displaced between 18 and 21 June from the city and Abu Shouk camp as security and humanitarian conditions worsened. On 26 June, additional waves of civilians fled neighbourhoods such as Al-Nasr, Al-Daraja Al-Ula, Al-Shorfa and the Abu Shouk camp; residents cited ongoing shelling, lack of cash, medicine and basic services.

==== Pre-final offensive consolidation (July–October) ====
During this phase, the siege transitioned into high-intensity urban operations as the RSF sought to consolidate its encirclement and prepare for a decisive strike on the last major stronghold of the SAF in Darfur. On 1 July, RSF artillery fire struck western neighbourhoods of the city, killing seven civilians including five members of one family and injuring others as the SAF mounted a counter-attack on the southern axis. By 7 July the RSF resumed heavy shelling on displacement-camp areas in Abu Shouk, killing seven civilians including four children and forcing residents to shelter in trenches. On 15 July, the RSF targeted the Abu Shouk camp market with approximately 30 shells, killing four and wounding six including children, while thousands fled the camp under fire.

In August and September the RSF intensified its offensive manoeuvres and tightened the logistical noose around El Fasher's SAF-held positions. On 12 August the RSF renewed artillery strikes in Naivasha market, Abu Shouk al-Hilla and Al-Daraja al-Awwal neighbourhoods, killing nine civilians and injuring 13 others, while hospitals like the Saudi Hospital reported receiving dozens of wounded under conditions of acute shortage. On 24 August, verified video and eyewitness evidence confirmed that the RSF had penetrated parts of the city, reaching the Grand Mosque and the Al-Nasr neighbourhood, and were digging trenches to isolate the SAF's 6th Infantry Division headquarters, signalling an operational shift to urban encirclement and breach tactics. By 25 September the humanitarian toll was stark: food prices soared in the besieged city, with the RSF blockade since 10 May 2024 cited as the cause of the crisis.

Between July and October 2025, the humanitarian situation in El Fasher reached catastrophic levels as the prolonged siege tightened and civilian suffering escalated. In late July, the World Food Programme (WFP) reported that although it was attempting to deliver aid to those trapped in the city, shrinking funding, impassable roads due to seasonal flooding and security constraints made operations increasingly untenable. Food‑prices continued their sharp rise: by late September a kilogram of rice in El Fasher had risen to 500,000 Sudanese pounds, meat to 100,000 pounds per kilo, and sugar reached 70,000 pounds per pound — in a city of approximately 250,000 civilians at risk of starvation.

In early September, volunteers managed to distribute food to around 90 displaced families, but these small efforts fell far short of the need. Women, children and older people were among the hardest hit. Hospitals in the city were operating under near‑impossible conditions: the blockade severed supply routes for medicine and equipment, malnutrition among children and pregnant women soared, and disease such as cholera and malaria proliferated in the camps and city wards.

==== Prior to the fall (September–October) ====
Between September and October 2025 the city transitioned from being under siege to having collapsed under the assault of the RSF. Throughout September, the RSF intensified its offensive: drone strikes and artillery bombardments targeted neighbourhoods such as Abu Shouk and peripheral zones, while SAF attempted counterattacks with drones from the air force. By mid‑October, food supplies and medicine in El Fasher had reportedly “completely disappeared” as the RSF's encirclement closed in; a satellite imagery study documented a 57 km earthen barrier built by the RSF around the city. By 6 October the clashes were fierce and sustained: on that day 15 civilians were killed and 21 injured, as RSF coordinated its attack across multiple fronts while the SAF and allied forces attempted to repel the escalating offensive.

Mid‑October further exposed the humanitarian toll and the breakdown of defence. On 9 October, RSF artillery struck the Saudi Specialized Hospital, killing eight people and injuring many more. The hospital, the last functional major medical facility in the city, suffered catastrophic damage and personnel shortages. Then, on 13 October, the UNICEF reported that at least 17 children, including a seven‑day‑old infant, were killed in an attack on the Dar al‑Arqam Displacement Centre in El Fasher, where up to 60 people may have died in an assault allegedly carried out by RSF forces. The facility, meant to shelter displaced civilians, was struck while siege conditions severely limited food, water and medical supplies for those trapped inside.

As the offensive accelerated, the surrounding camps and civilian zones became battle‑spaces. The RSF, having constricted movement and supplies for months, switched to high‑tempo operations: artillery strikes, drone attacks, trench infiltration and mechanised sweeps. SAF‑affiliated fighters reported being drawn into prepared kill zones near the city's southern periphery, while civilians raced for escape routes now under fire. Satellite imagery and humanitarian monitoring confirmed the enclosure of the city and the RSF's tightening grip; the fall was imminent.

== Fall of the city and massacre ==
On 26 October 2025, after 3 days of intensified ground battles, during which approximately 5,000 people (of an estimated population of 250,000 as of the fall of the city) fled the city, the SAF 6th Infantry Division headquarters fell to the RSF. Videos shared on RSF media showed masses of people fleeing the city in large lines while SAF soldiers yelled at them from inside trucks. Reports emerged of executions and arrests of fleeing civilians. Remaining SAF forces retreated towards the Al-Daraja Al-Ula neighbourhood in the west of the city, where thousands of civilians gathered. Other videos showed men of military age being rounded up and kneeling on the ground while an RSF yelled at the civilians "you are all army". The SAF initially denied defeat until the fall of the Daraja Oula area, when they stated they withdrew from the city to prevent further bloodshed. Official social media footage from the RSF showed their fighters celebrating inside the 6th Infantry Division headquarters. By 27 October the city fell (Note: Minor skirmishes and clashes with army remnants likely continue.) (Note: The Yale University School of Public Health Humanitarian Research Lab (HRL) corroborates the fall of El-Fasher to RSF through the fusion of open source, and remote sensing data.) to the RSF. On 28 October Abdel Fattah al-Burhan confirmed that the army had withdrawn from the city. Reports emerged of the deaths of more than 2,500 civilians; by late November, estimates of the number of massacred civilians had reached 60,000. Many of the murdered civilians were part of the Zaghawa ethnic group. The fall of the city drew comparisons to the Al Geneina massacre, which resulted in the deaths of 15,000 civilians. A telecommunications blackout remains in the city.

El Fasher was the last SAF stronghold in the west of Darfur. With its fall, all five of Darfur's state capitals were controlled by the RSF.

Médecins Sans Frontières have reported that of arrivals to the Tawila refugee camp during the week prior to the fall of the city, about 5% of children were acutely malnourished, and 26% were severely malnourished. The UN estimated that over 26,000 people fled El Fasher within two days, mostly to Tawila. In January 2026 Reuters reported that RSF fighters and allied militias had abducted children during the capture of El Fasher.

On 4 November, the IPC's Famine Review Committee reported with "reasonable evidence" that El Fasher is in an IPC5 famine, the most severe level of food insecurity on the IPC scale.

== Casualties ==
In October 2025, sources from the 6th Infantry Division revealed the army death toll during the battle from April 2023 to 30 August 2025 was at around 8,600 personnel, including more than 8,500 soldiers and 1,000 officers. Another 2,400 soldiers were wounded, many suffering serious injuries which rendered them permanently off the battlefield. Additionally, hundreds of fighters from government-allied militias were believed to have been killed, while more than 3,000 personnel, mostly militia fighters, had deserted their posts.

== Analysis ==
With the city's capture, the RSF consolidated control over the Darfur region. Analysts said this advanced a de facto partition of Sudan.

An October 2026 BBC investigation found that the RSF had systematically dismantled El Fasher's healthcare system during the siege and capture of the city. The investigation identified at least 43 attacks on hospitals and other healthcare facilities between May 2024 and October 2025. It also found that 55 healthcare workers were killed, 10 disappeared, and 120 were injured between April 2023 to October 2025. In some cases, medical facilities were attacked again after relocating.

== See also ==
- Darfur genocide (2023–present)
- Masalit genocide
- Battle of Geneina
- Battle of Nyala
- Battle of Al Maliha
