= Hashaba =

Town in Sudan

Hashaba الهشابه
- Location in Sudan
- Coordinates: 13°36′33″N 22°27′57″E
- Country: Sudan
- State: West Darfur
- City: Geneina
- Time zone: Central Africa Time, GMT + 3

Hashabah (Arabic: الهشابه) or Al-Hashaba is a town in the West Darfur, Sudan.

== History ==
In 2019, the International Committee of the Red Cross provided water for Hashabah. In 2023, many refugees of the Battle of Kutum fled to Hashabah.
