= El Sadig El Foka =

- الصادق الفوكا
- El Foka (possibly middle) with Karjakola (left) and SLM-TC commander Salah Adam Tor Rasas in El Fasher, 2023
- Born: Sadig Abdelkarim Adam
- Military career
- Allegiance: Sudan Liberation Movement – Abdelwahid el-Nur (until 2016); Sudanese Armed Forces (2017-present); Sudan Liberation Movement – El Foka (2016-present)
- Nickname: El Foka
- Commands: Head of SLM-El Foka
- Conflicts: War in Darfur; Sudanese civil war (2023-present); Siege of El Fasher

El Sadig Abdelkarim Adam (Arabic: الصادق عبد الكريم آدم), also known as El Sadig El Foka (Arabic: الصادق الفوكا) (Note: Also spelled Al-Sadiq Abdelkarim, Al-Sadiq Abdel-Karim, al-Sadiq Foka, El Sadig Fakka, Sadiq Adam Abdelkarim, or just El Foka.) is a Sudanese warlord who leads a faction of the Sudan Liberation Movement (SLM-El Foka). El Foka participated in the siege of El Fasher.

== Biography ==
El Foka initially was a commander in the Sudan Liberation Movement (SLM) faction led by Abdulwahid El Nur, and based in Tawila, North Darfur. He defected with 1,500 of his men to the Sudanese Armed Forces in 2016, and signed a peace deal with the Sudanese government in North Darfur. His new group was referred to as the Sudan Liberation Movement for Peace and Development (SLM-PD). (Note: SLM-PD is the official name of the group as of 2017, but is referred to as SLM-El Foka in every instance after 2017.) In 2018, El Foka's forces detained 21 civilians from Sortony, North Darfur without trial in Kabkabiya and moved them to the notorious Shala prison in El Fasher.

During the interwar period between 2019 and 2023, El Foka's forces clashed infrequently with SLM-AW near Jebel Marra. In one battle in 2021, five of El Foka's soldiers were killed at Aru. At another, between July 17 and 18, SLM-AW forces attacked herders near Sortony and ransacked livestock. Civilians called on El Foka's forces to fight back, and a battle ensued that left 17 civilians dead as well as several of El Foka's soldiers.

SLM-El Foka fought at the siege of El Fasher on the side of the Sudanese Armed Forces in 2023 during the Sudanese civil war. In July 2023, his forces were reported to be roaming around the city's markets, plundering and looting shops and civilian homes. On August 18, 2023, SLM-El Foka fought with the Rapid Support Forces in El Fasher. Several civilians were injured in indiscriminate shelling perpetrated by El Foka's men.
