= Sudanese Awakening Revolutionary Council =

Militant group in Darfur

- المجلس الثوري الصحوي السوداني
- Leader: Musa Hilal
- Dates active: January 2014 – present
- Active regions: Darfur, Sudan
- Wars: the War in Darfur

The Sudanese Awakening Revolutionary Council (Arabic: المجلس الثوري الصحوي السوداني; SARC) is an armed militia in Darfur, Sudan, led by Sudanese Arab tribal chief Musa Hilal.

== History ==
SARC was founded in January 4 2014, when Hilal defected from the National Congress Party (NCP). Hilal claimed that the group was coordinating with the Sudan Revolutionary Front (SRF). SARC identifies itself as an Mahamid rebel group, which is a Rizeigat clan and of which Musa Hilal was the tribal chief.

In August of 2017 Musa Hilal was detained after he refused to co-operate with the Sudanese governments disarmament campaign. in 2014 SARC maintained control over the towns of Kutum, Kabkabiya and Saraf Umra.

== Sudanese Civil War ==
Months after the current civil war began Hilal and his Forces joined the Sudanese Armed Forces.

On 24 February 2026, Rapid Support Forces (RSF) raided an SARC stronghold in North Darfur killing reportedly 28 civilians. Tensions between RSF and SARC were worsened after SARC was accused of killing Hamid Ali Abu Bakr a high-ranking advisor for the RSF. The RSF had also sponsored a tribal gathering to appoint new leadership for the Mahamid, a move that triggered defections to SARC among RSF fighters.
