= European Union sanctions =

An essential tool of the EU's Common Foreign and Security Policy (CFSP) are restrictive measures, also known as "sanctions". They are utilised by the EU as a component of a coordinated and all-encompassing policy approach that includes political discussion, complementary actions, and the use of other tools at its disposal.

In order to advance the CFSP's goals, sanctions aim to change the behaviour or policy of those who are targeted. They may be addressed to governments of non-EU nations because of their policies; to entities (companies) which provide a means to carry out the targeted policies; groups or organisations, such as terrorist organisations; and people who support the targeted policies or who engage in terrorist activities, etc.

== Targeted parties ==
=== Countries/governments ===
Country	Year introduced	Summary
Afghanistan	2021	Sanctions against the Taliban government
Belarus	2005	Sanctions against those affiliated with the Alexander Lukashenko government including Lukashenko
Burundi	2015	Sanctions against Burundian government officials who are deemed to undermine democracy.
China	2021	Over alleged human rights abuses on the Uyghurs in Xinjiang
Iran	2011	Restrictive measures in view of Iran's military support of Russia's war of aggression against Ukraine and restrictive measures in relation to serious human rights violations in Iran
Mali	2021	Sanctions against government officials who took part in the 2021 Malian coup d'état
Myanmar	2021	Sanctions against the Burmese Junta in relation to 2021 Myanmar coup d'état. Sanctions include those against Min Aung Hlaing
Nicaragua	2019	Restrictions against the Daniel Ortega government in view of the continuing deterioration of democracy, the rule of law and human rights in Nicaragua.
Niger	2023	Sanctions over 2023 Nigerien coup d'état
North Korea	2016	Measures in place due to North Korea's nuclear program and situation of human rights in North Korea
Russia	2014	Sanctions over violating the territorial integrity of Ukraine. Sanctioned individuals include Russian President Vladimir Putin and Russia's Minister for Foreign Affairs, Sergey Lavrov
Transnistria	2003	Sanctions over undermining the territorial integrity of the Republic of Moldova.
Republic of Crimea; Donetsk People's Republic; Luhansk People's Republic	2014	Sanctions over undermining the territorial integrity of Ukraine.
Venezuela	2017	Restrictions against the Nicolas Maduro government in view of the continuing deterioration of democracy, the rule of law and human rights in Venezuela.
Zimbabwe	2002	Restrictions against the ZANU-PF government in view of the continuing deterioration of democracy, the rule of law and human rights in Zimbabwe.

=== Other sanctions ===
Country	Year introduced	Summary
Bosnia and Herzegovina	2011	Although it does not currently apply to any specific people, it gives the EU a framework for imposing penalties on people who endanger the security and integrity of Bosnia and Herzegovina. Individuals whose actions undermine the sovereignty may be subject to the restrictive measures outlined in the Regulations.
Central African Republic	2013	Restrictive measures on individuals and entities responsible for threatening the peace, security or stability of the Central African Republic, or for undermining democracy or the rule of law in the Central African Republic.
Democratic Republic of the Congo	1993	Restrictive measures on individuals and entities responsible for threatening the peace, security or stability of the Congo, or for undermining democracy or the rule of law in the Congo.
Guatemala	2024	In view of the persistent attempts to nullify the democratic results of the general and presidential elections in Guatemala, which resulted in a clear victory of President-elect Bernardo Arévalo, as attested by the EU Election Observation Mission (EOM) to Guatemala.
Guinea	2009	Restrictive measures on individuals and entities responsible for threatening the peace, security or stability of Guinea, or for undermining democracy or the rule of law in Guinea.
Guinea-Bissau	2012	EU restrictive measures against Guinea-Bissau were introduced on 3 May 2012. Travel restrictions and an asset freeze were imposed targeting those who sought to prevent or block a peaceful political process or who took action that undermined stability in the Republic of Guinea-Bissau, in particular those who played a leading role in the mutiny of 1 April 2010 and the coup d’état of 12 April 2012. The measures also target those who sought to undermine the rule of law, curtailing the primacy of civilian power and furthering impunity and instability in the country.
Haiti	2023	Restrictive measures on individuals and entities responsible for threatening the peace, security or stability of Haiti, or for undermining democracy or the rule of law in Haiti.
Iraq	2003	Currently, only specific restrictions apply in the areas of trade in goods belonging to Iraq's cultural heritage and an asset freeze specifically targeting former Iraqi President Saddam Hussein, his immediate family, and senior officials of his regime.
Lebanon	2006	United Nations resolutions that target persons who engaged in acts that threaten the peace, security or stability of Lebanon.
Libya	2011	Restrictive measures in relation to persons and entities involved in serious human rights abuses against persons in Libya.
Serbia	1994	It is strictly limited to a ban on settling specific claims made in connection with contracts impacted by the revoked UN regulations.
Somalia	1992	Restrictive measures in view of the situation in Somalia
South Sudan	2016	Restrictive measures in view of the situation in South Sudan
Sudan	1994	Restrictive measures in view of the situation in Sudan
Tunisia	2011	Restrictive actions against those who are misusing Tunisian State funds, denying the people of Tunisia the advantages of a sustainable development of their society and economy, and undermining the growth of democracy in the nation.
Turkey	2019	Sanctions against State owned Turkish hydrocarbon companies like Turkish Petroleum Corporation
Yemen	2014	United Nations resolution that targets persons who engaged in acts that threaten the peace, security or stability of Yemen.

=== Individuals ===
The European Union has also sanctioned entities and individuals. In relation to the Sudanese civil war started in 2023 it took several actions. On 22 January 2024 it first sanctioned 6 entities with ties to the Sudanese Armed Forces and the Rapid Support Forces. With Council Implementing Regulation (EU) 2024/1783 on 24 June 2024 it also added six persons on the list of sanctioned individuals and entities. They were Mirghani Idriss Suleiman, El Tahir Mohamed El Awad El Amin, Ali Ahmed Karti, Abdulrahman Juma Barakallah, Mustafa Ibrahim Abdel Nabi Mohamed and Masar Abdurahman Aseel. With Council Implementing Regulation (EU) 2024/3156 of 16 December 2024 it added four others: Salah Abdallah Mohamed Salah, Tijani Karshom, Mohamed Ali Ahmed Subir and Osman Mohamed Hamid Mohamed.

On 18 July 2025 it added two further individuals, Abu Aqla Kikal and Hussein Barsham to the list of sanctioned indiduals. It also added two businesses. With Council Implementing Regulation (EU) 2025/2368 of 20 November 2025 it added Abdul Rahim Dagalo for violations committed by his troops. With Council Decision (CFSP) 2026/254 it added seven more individuals on 29 January 2026. They were: Algony Hamdan Dagalo Musa, Elfateh Abdullah Idris Adam, Edris Kafuti, Tijani Ibrahim Moussa Mohamed, Gedo Hamdan, Abu Zaid Talha Al-Misbah and Al-Tayyib Al-Imam Joda.

== See also ==
- Rule of Law Conditionality Regulation (Internal sanction on EU member state)
- United Kingdom government sanctions
- United States government sanctions
