= Al Jamia mosque massacre =

2025 killing in the Sudanese Civil War

- Part of Sudanese Civil War
- Location: El Fasher, Darfur, Sudan
- Date: 19 September 2025
- Target: Darfuri civilians
- Deaths: 75 civilians killed
- Perpetrator: Rapid Support Forces

On 19 September 2025, Rapid Support Forces militias in Sudan fired a missile at a mosque in the besieged city of El Fasher, killing 75 civilians as they carried out their Friday prayer.

== Background ==
Since April 2023, Sudan has been in a civil war between two factions, the Rapid Support Forces with the Janjaweed and the local Sudanese armed forces. The Rapid Support Forces maintain the belief of racial superiority of their imagined Arab ancestry, and due to their power base in Darfur the locals which are viewed as “lesser” due to their African identity are being subject to severe ethnic violence.

== Massacre ==
In the early morning, residents of the besiege El Fasher congregated in Al Jamia mosque to perform Islamic Friday prayers. An RSF drone then struck the mosque which was an explicitly civilian structure, and the missile explosion severely damaged the building, killing dozens of worshippers. The massacre is considered one of the deadliest single attacks during the war which has been ongoing for over two years.

== Aftermath ==
The Jamia mosque massacre was then followed by a series of massacres targeting displacement camps, before the city defend by SAF 6th Infantry Division for over 500 days were overrun by RSF militia on the 27th October 2025.
