= Musa Hilal =

Sudanese warlord

- موسى هلال
- Born: 1961 (age 64–65)
- Political party: National Congress Party (until 2014), Sudanese Awakening Revolutionary Council (2014–present)
- Children: Amani Musa Hilal
- Father: Hilal Muhammad Abdallah
- Family: Idriss Deby (son-in-law)

Musa Hilal (Arabic: موسى هلال, romanized: Mūsa Hilāl), sometimes spelled as Musa Hillal is a Sudanese Arab Baggara tribal chief and militia leader and adviser to the Sudanese Minister of Internal Affairs. He is the leader of the Um Jalul clan of the Mahamid, who are part of a larger confederation of camel-herding (Abbala) tribes of the Northern Rizeigat. Musa is the leader of the Janjaweed militia, which was responsible for a massive military campaign against civilians in Darfur in 2003, as part of a counterinsurgency effort against Darfur rebel groups. On 21 January 2008, the Federal Government of Sudan announced the nomination of Musa Hilal as the chief advisor of the Ministry of Federal Affairs in Sudan. This position allows Mr. Musa to coordinate with regional leaders surrounding Darfur, as well as with Arab tribal groups, on the relations of the military regime.

This political position further permits the military leader power over decisions made in Khartoum pertaining the recruitment of Janjaweed militias. In January 2014 Musa defected from Sudan's ruling National Congress Party, and launched a new movement known as the Sudanese Awakening Revolutionary Council. As of late March 2014 Musa was running his own administration in North Darfur, with his troops controlling Saraf Umra town, Kutum town, Kabkabiya town, and the El Waha area.

He was arrested in November 2017. By the time Sudanese President and National Congress Party leader Omar al-Bashir was deposed April 2019, it was reported that Musa still remained in prison.

On 11 March 2021, Hilal was released after receiving a pardon granted by the Sovereign Council, the institution responsible for the transition in Sudan. Hilal remains under UN sanctions and is accused of serious crimes in Darfur.

On 22 February 2026, Hilal survived an attempted assassination attempt, in which the Rapid Support Forces (RSF) conducted a drone strike which hit Hilal's guest house in Mustariha, North Darfur. Hilal subsequently fled to government-controlled territory outside Darfur following an RSF attack on Mustariha.

== Background ==
Musa was born in 1961, belonging to the Mahamid section of northern Rizayqat confederation. His father, Hilal Muhammad Abdallah, had during a long sheikh-ship sought increased influence by welcoming from Chad other Rizayqat tribesmen, a policy pursued also by his rival for tribal leadership, Shaykh Adud Hassaballah of the Mahariya branch.

Hilal is the nazir of a camel-herding Um Jalul clan in North Darfur. As of 2004, he had three wives and 13 children.

== Janjaweed ==
The Janjaweed is an Arab militia accused of killing and raping civilians that forced more than a million Black African villagers from their homes in Darfur. Musa Hilal was accused of being the most senior field commander of the Janjaweed during the Darfur conflict. Witnesses described Hilal as coordinating attacks on civilians in Darfur, including killings, sexual violence and the burning of villages. One witness described Hilal's leading role during the February 2004 attack on Tawila, which led to 75 deaths and over 100 women being raped. A former recruit from a Janjaweed training camp also alleged that Hilal had encouraged hostility towards Black African groups and had personally led fighters in combat.

Musa has acknowledged his role in the recruitment of Janjaweed militias, although he consistently denied that he was part of the military chain of command of the Janjaweed. He claims to be merely an influential sheikh in the area. In his own words: "It is a lie. Janjaweed is a thief. A criminal. I am a tribal leader, with men and women and children who follow me. How can they all be thieves and bandits? It is not possible."

He also reported in an interview by Human Rights Watch on 27 September 2004: "... I am not a criminal. Thank God I’m not afraid. I’ve never had any fear. If there’s a concrete complaint and an investigation is opened against me, I can go to court – nobody is above the law – but not because of allegations made by Ali al Haj and Khalil Ibrahim, who are rebel leaders, who make up dark information and give to the UN, and they put my name on the list. That’s not right."

Musa also claims that actions by the Janjaweed are organized and directed from the federal government in Khartoum under Sudanese President Omar Hassan al-Bashir. In a video interview with Human Rights Watch, Musa Hilal stated that the attacks by the militia were directly ordered by the Sudanese government, and noted that "all of the people in the field are led by top army commanders…These people get their orders from the Western command center, and from Khartoum."

According to noted Sudan scholar Alex de Waal, "Mr. Hilal's claim that he has no control over any militia does not bear scrutiny... He is at the center of all of this." In letters to government officials and other tribal leaders, Sheikh Musa Hilal has repeatedly said his fighters are engaged in a jihad, or holy war, and will not disarm even if the government demands it. "We will not retreat," he wrote in one such letter in 2004 to the leaders in Khartoum, "we continue on the road of jihad." Trying to disarm his men, he wrote, would be "cowardly," and impossible to enforce. Another communique from Sheikh Musa's headquarters in 2004, obtained by de Waal, demanded the militias to "change the demography of Darfur and empty it of African tribes."

== Accusations ==
Musa Hilal has been accused of inciting ethnic conflicts in some areas in Darfur. In the 1990s, he was imprisoned on criminal charges, which included the murder of 17 people of African descent, and the robbery of the Central Bank of Nyala. In 2003 Musa Hilal was sent to prison in Port Sudan by the governor of North Darfur, but was released in April 2003 supposedly on Vice President Ali Osman Taha’s orders and given the authority to recruit and command militia forces.

After his release Musa Hilal settled in Kebkabiya, where he supposedly organized a meeting to recruit Arab tribesmen from Awlad Rashid, Ireqat and Um Jalul. He is the leader of the Um Jalul tribe, which plays a major role in the attacks in Darfur. He has been named by victims, witnesses of the attacks, and member of the armed force, as second in command of the Janjaweed militias, "border intelligence brigade," in Misteriya. He was reported to have met numerous times with militia leaders to coordinate other village attacks.

Musa Hilal has also been accused of kidnapping women and keeping them imprisoned in West Misteriya, at Jebel Jur Hilal. In 2006, the United Nations imposed travel and financial bans on Musa Hilal. Musa Hilal was quoted as saying, “the travel ban – that would be a humiliation. I am a tribal leader. My reputation comes above anything and everything.”

On 27 February 2008, Mr. Reeves reported the destruction of 30 villages, the assassination of 200 people, the rape of over 200 girls and women, and the kidnapping of 150 women and 200 children. These actions, Reeves argued, were executed by Janjaweed militias under direct order of militia leader, Musa Hilal.

The international pressure that has been building up over the Sudanese government to address the attacks against civilians may force the government to give up Musa Hilal to international authorities. Musa Hilal is said to hold enough information to pose a threat to the Sudanese government if the latter were to turn against him. Thus, the Sudanese government has often dismissed international criticism regarding its decision to promote Musa Hilal to adviser to Federal Affairs Minister Abdel Basit Sabderat. Sudanese President Al Bashir was quoted as saying, “[Musa Hilal] contributed greatly to stability and security in the region."

== Influence in Chad ==
In December 2011 it was reported that Musa's daughter, Amani Musa, was going to marry the president of Chad, Idriss Deby. The two were married on 21 January 2012.

== See also ==
- Darfur Conflict
