= Border Intelligence Brigade (Sudan) =

Border Guard in Sudan

Border Intelligence Brigade مخابرات الحدود السودانية
- Abbreviation: BIB

Agency overview
- Formed: 2003; 23 years ago
- Dissolved: 2020
- Employees: 11,000 (in 2010)

Jurisdictional structure
- National agency: SD
- Federal agency: SD
- Operations jurisdiction: SD
- General nature: Federal law enforcement; Military police; Civilian police

Operational structure
- Headquarters: Khartoum

Notables
- People: Musa Hilal, for Tribal chief; Hemedti, for Leader of the Rapid Support Forces; Abu Lulu, for RSF Commander; Yasser al-Atta, for SAF General
- Significant Battles: War in Darfur; Sudanese conflict in South Kordofan and Blue Nile

Border Intelligence Brigade (BIB) also known as the Border Guards (Arabic: مخابرات الحدود السودانية) was a paramilitary group operating in Sudan, created to monitor the border areas of Sudan and fight against insurgents.

== History ==
BIB was created in 2003 as a paramilitary force led by Al-Hadi Hamid el-Tayeed and its purpose was to guard the borders of Sudan and to fight against Insurgents in the Darfur War. BIB members consisted mostly of Rizeigat tribesmen and speficially Rizeigat tribesmen from the Mahamid and Mahariya clans. In 2005 Janjaweed forces fighting alongside the government in Darfur were absorbed to more controlled forces like the Popular Defence Force, Central Reserve Forces and the BIB, although the United Nations (UN) considered that BIB absorbed most of the Janjaweed fighters.

The BIB included smaller groups based on tribal allegiance. Leader of the Mahamid clan Musa Hilal commandeered a group called the " Quick and Horrible Forces". Other groups included "Battalion 8" which was led by Mohammed Hamdan Dagalo who belonged to the Mahariya clan. Battalion 8 was involved heavily in fighting against the insurgents in Southern Darfur and other Arab groups in West Darfur. In 2007 Hemedti started a rebellion against the Sudanese Armed Forces (SAF) over unpaid salaries. The rebellion lasted for six months and ended when Hemedti threatened to storm Nyala, which forced the government to compromise with their demands. In 2010 after the collapse of a large Ponzi scheme in El Fasher, Hilal started protesting against the government alleging that it gave favorited the Mahariya "Battalion 8" over Musa Hilals forces. These disputes lead to the government separating Hemedtis forces from the Border Guards. In 2013 Hemedti and his troops from the BIB formed the Rapid Support Forces (RSF) paramilitary group, which left Musa Hilal as the leader of the BIB. On May 19 2014, heavy fighting broke out between the RSF and Border Guard forces. The fighting lead to Hilal forming BIB into a new armed group called the Sudanese Awakening Revolutionary Council (SARC) fighting against the Sudanese Government.

On 19 August 2017, Musa Hilal rejected the integration of Border Forces to the RSF. Following the refusal clashes took place between the RSF and the BIB near the Sudan-Egypt-Libya border. In late 2017 RSF killed 17 of Hilals men, whom were returning from Libya. The Border Guards were reportedly active in 2020. In March 2022 Hemedti accused SAF of re-establishing the Border Guards.
