= El Fasher massacre =

Massacre of civilians in Sudan since 2025

- Part of the second Darfur genocide, the aftermath of the siege of El Fasher, and war crimes during the Third Sudanese Civil War
- Left to right: Possible executed bodies; Possible body bags on the location of a former children's hospital, which has been used as a detention centre by the RSF, on 27 October

- Location within Sudan with North Darfur state highlighted
- Native name: مجزرة الفاشر
- Location: 13°37′50″N 25°21′0″E; El Fasher, North Darfur, Sudan
- Date: 26 October–4 November 2025 (Note: Although sources agree that the massacre began on 26 October 2025, its end date is uncertain. This article gives 4 November 2025 based on the sources in this article, while an 8 July 2026 UNHCR report suggests that genocidal abuses—particularly killings—occurred over the 3-day period from 26 to 28 October 2025.)
- Target: Non-Arab ethnicities (Fur, Zaghawa and Berti); Prisoners of war of the SAF; Other El Fasher civilians
- Attack type: Mass killing, ethnic cleansing, genocidal massacre, genocidal rape
- Deaths: 6,000 (documented within first three days); 60,000+ (estimates)
- Perpetrators: Government of Peace and Unity; Rapid Support Forces (denied by RSF); Janjaweed
- Motive: Tribalism, Arab supremacy, Arabization
- Convicted: Abu Lulu and other soldiers (by RSF, reportedly)

A genocidal massacre in the city of El Fasher in western Sudan was carried out between 26 October and 4 November 2025. Tens of thousands of civilians were executed or murdered, spawning a prolonged refugee crisis. The massacre was carried out by the Rapid Support Forces (RSF) paramilitary group after they captured the city, which was the last Sudanese Armed Forces (SAF) stronghold in Darfur—marking the end of official state presence in the city and perhaps the region. Humanitarian experts consider it the worst war crime committed during the Sudanese civil war, characterized by mass atrocities and ethnic cleansing.

The Yale School of Public Health's Humanitarian Research Lab (HRL) estimated that following the initial 26 October massacre, the "250,000 remaining civilians [had] been killed by RSF, died, been displaced, or persist[ed] in hiding". In November 2025, a communications blackout in the city was still limiting information. The Yale HRL estimated that the figures of those killed are "undercounted" and Sky News claimed that analysts estimate "tens of thousands" of individuals killed. El Fasher's Resistance Committee stated that many of those living in El Fasher's core were killed.

The speed and intensity of the killings in the immediate aftermath of the fall of El Fasher has been compared to the first 24 hours of the Rwandan genocide. According to Sudanese journalist and author Nesrine Malik, "the RSF of today is the Janjaweed of yesteryear, except this time armed to the teeth, supported by powerful external allies, and with a renewed appetite to purge once more non-Arab populations it has been hostile to for decades." On 16 November 2025, Sudan researcher Eric Reeves described the RSF as a "genocidal militia force" and the massacre as a "genocidal slaughter". A United Nations (UN) fact-finding mission also reported in 2026 that the massacre showed "the hallmarks of genocide".

== Background ==
El Fasher is the capital of the North Darfur state of Sudan. Due to refugees from various conflicts, notably the War in Darfur, the population of the city has varied. In 2001 the city had a population of approximately 178,500 people. By 2009 it was estimated at 500,000.

Since 2023, a civil war has been raging across Sudan. It began as a result of a power struggle between the Sudanese Armed Forces (SAF), led by Abdel Fattah al-Burhan, and the paramilitary Rapid Support Forces (RSF), led by Muhammad Dagalo, better known by the mononym Hemedti. The RSF was created by Sudanese president Omar al-Bashir in 2013, formed from existing Janjaweed militias in Darfur, a region of western Sudan. The Janjaweed were a major perpetrator of the Darfur genocide against the Fur, Masalit, and Zaghawa ethnic groups.

Fighting in El Fasher began in the outset of the civil war, with the RSF having claimed to have captured the El Fasher airport and several military sites. On 20 April, RSF and SAF commanders fighting throughout the city agreed to a ceasefire, which would be followed by a slew of sporadic clashes and short-lived ceasefires. Between mid-November 2023 and April 2024, the RSF prepared for the siege, first suspected as a rumors. As the RSF captured a growing amount of territory between 2023 and 2025, El Fasher nevertheless remained one of the few SAF strongholds; the SAF's defensive efforts before the eventual siege was supported by local armed groups and some of the city's residents.

=== Siege of El Fasher, construction of the berm, and the fall of El Fasher ===
Map of the Siege of El Fasher between 2023 and 2025.

The RSF brought El Fasher under siege on 13 April 2023, when the first major battle there took place. Over the next two years, there were several clashes between armed forces. In May 2024 it was estimated the city had a population of 1.5 million, of whom at least 800,000 were internally displaced people sheltering there. Throughout the siege a large number of people fled to various refugee camps, such as the Tawila refugee camp and the Zamzam Refugee Camp, the latter of which was destroyed by the RSF, killing up to 2,000 people and forcing an exodus of 400,000 refugees to Tawila.

In October 2025, El Fasher remained the last stronghold of the SAF in Darfur. According to estimates, during September and October 2025 more than 260,000 civilians were trapped in the city because of the siege. During this period, reports documented a deteriorating humanitarian crisis, with UN convoys even being struck by drone attacks. Human rights bodies of intergovernmental (IGO) and non-governmental organizations (NGO) alike repeatedly pleaded for humanitarian aid to be allowed into El Fasher; this included UN Security Council (UNSC) Resolution 2736, which demanded the RSF to halt the siege and deescalate fighting. Among other demands to decrease suffering throughout Sudan, it additionally demanded the RSF and SAF to allow civilians to move in and out of El Fasher to safer areas. Additionally, experts had long warned of the atrocities, blaming the arms trade and inaction by the international community.

Following intensified RSF attacks on the city, the SAF retreated late on 27 October 2025, resulting in the fall of the city. On 28 October, al-Burhan confirmed that the SAF had withdrawn from the city. In the ensuing raid on the city, which the RSF described as "combing operation on a large-scale," the group claimed that it has an "utmost commitment" to protect civilians, of whom approximately 260,000 remained in the city at the time its capture.

=== Motives ===
==== Allegations of collaboration and spying ====
RSF fighters are suspected to have justified the massacre by branding those who remained in the city after the SAF left as collaborators or spies. According to testimony provided to Amnesty International, despite being asked if they were soldiers or civilians, residents of the city were told—according to an testimony recounting the words of an RSF soldiers before executing four civilians—that "in El Fasher, there are no civilians, everybody is a soldier."

==== Ethnic ====
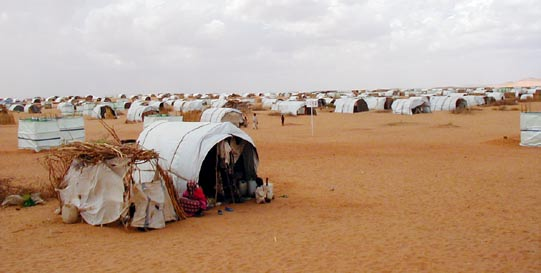
El Fasher had long served as a destination for those fleeing violence throughout the War in Darfur, whose victims largely included ethnic groups targeted by the Janjaweed

Further reports by Médecins Sans Frontières (lit. transl. Doctors Without Borders) and others stated that the killings have been reported as indiscriminate but ethnically targeted. Eyewitnesses recounted RSF soldiers asking civilians what "tribe" they were from and would execute them on the spot depending on the answer. Some testimonies were provided by survivors being treated in nearby Tawila. Sources within the RSF, some of which perpetrated killings, confirmed that the massacre was systematically executed on ethnic bases. They added that the RSF made arrangements allowing those "not on the list of targeted ethnicities to flee the city." The Centre for Information Resilience (CIR) observed numerous uses of ethnic slurs, including derogatory language, including referring to civilians as "slaves," "falangay," (Note: According to CIR, "falangay" refers to "someone perceived as a slave or sycophant who prioritises their leader’s benefit over their own or their people’s interests. During this period, the RSF employed the term primarily to refer to SAF-allied forces from the Sudan Liberation Movement/Army (SLM/A-Mini Minawi) and the Justice and Equality Movement (JEM), whose fighters are predominantly Zaghawa and other non-Arab groups native to Darfur—groups that have historically faced systemic racism in Sudan.") and "donkeys." (Note: Footage collected by the CIR recorded RSF militants saying the following to civilians, detainees, and the camera: “[Shoot] them (x4), [shoot] them man, [shoot] them. (unintelligible) f*ck their mothers those people. [...] Just [shoot] them, beat them, Nuba sons of b*tches.” — Unidentified RSF militant, CIR-translated quote "Minawi [is a] slave, [...] Gibril [is a] slave, Abdullah Jana [is a] slave, they are all the slaves of money, they sold you, [...] Since you [were brought into life] you were slaves, and you die for them as slaves. [...] You donkeys, you filthy. I swear you'll die donkeys just like this. [...] [Minawi] sold you for money you donkeys. You'll die slaves you disgrace." — Unidentified RSF commander speaking to detainees, CIR-translated quote "[Oh] Falanga, go ahead you Falangayat, you fools. […] [Beat] him, [beat] them! [beat] them! move! Run after them! Beat them! [...] Beat them! beat them Falangayat! Beat them! […] cows! look at these cows, fools. Move! move you sons of dog! […] Beat them! beat them, fuck their mothers too. Falangayat, tired and filthy, [mercenaries]. You Falangayat! Filth! [...] Burhan and Minawi used you, [how come] Burhan deceive you? and Minawi deceive you? you sons of bitches! Go, damn your father too! For God's sake, [how come] Minawi deceive you?" — Unidentified RSF militant ordering other RSF militants to beat running detainees, CIR-translated quote) Based on evidence, experts corroborate the opinion that the killings are undoubtedly ethnically targeted, which was also recognized in the genocide against non-Arab Darfuri communities between 2003 and 2005.

Survivors, advocacy group representatives from NGO Protection Approaches and the IDP Humanitarian Network, and the UN said the attacks in El Fasher were done with the clear aim of ethnic cleansing and were part of a wider pattern of RSF violence across Darfur. Raymond compared the massacre to the first 24 hours of the Rwandan genocide.

==== Financial ====
Financial motives for the violence have also been repeatedly alleged–several thousand people were reportedly detained by the RSF to be held for ransom, with those not able to source payment being executed.

=== Funding and military support ===
According to Sudan researcher Eric Reeves, United Arab Emirates (UAE) funds are used to "pay RSF officers' salaries, to bribe those who might interdict weapons shipments, even to provide an extremely elaborate social media and public relations campaign out of Dubai". Reeves also sees the UAE as a major supplier of weapons to the RSF. He stated that UAE cargo planes are used to provide weapons to the RSF via intermediary countries, citing advanced, long-range Chinese howitzers as a key weapon in the siege of El Fasher supplied to the RSF by the UAE.

== Massacre ==
Interactive map of key locations captured by the RSF in the fall of El Fasher. Military infrastructure Civilian infrastructure

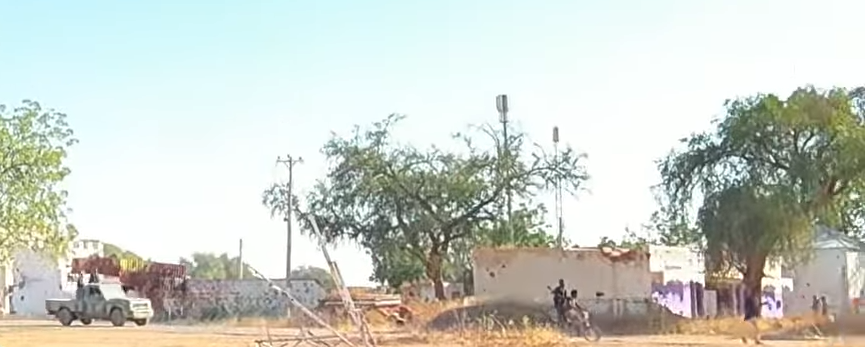
RSF forces in El Fasher on 28 October

Following an SAF order for troops to retreat from El Fasher on 26 October, the RSF entered the city in the night between 26 and 27 October. RSF troops first took over the 6th Infantry Division base between 6:00 a.m. and 10:00 a.m. local time. Between then and 6:00 p.m., they secured other key locations around the city. In videos released during this time, Hemedti's brother and RSF Deputy Commander, Abdul Rahim Dagalo, was seen in footage from the 6th Division base. (Note: Dagalo was seen alongside RSF commander Waleed Yusef Wahal, RSF commander of the North Darfur Sector Gedo Hamdan Ahmed (Abu Nashuk), and RSF commander Hussain Abo Jalak. Footage from outside the base shows Yassin Ahmed Abdullah of the RSF's El Fasher media department and RSF military correspondent and field commander Tijani Ibrahim Moussa Mohamed (known more commonly as “Al Zeir Salem”).) After taking hold of the city, multiple sources—including local organizations, international NGOs, the UN, and independent monitoring groups—reported a wave of executions targeting unarmed civilians. This included house-to-house raids during which civilians were killed by RSF fighters traveling on foot, by camel and in vehicles. (Note: According to multiple sources, including The Observer, SBS News, the United Nations, The New York Times, and Reuters.) Confusion ensued as the fall of defenses was followed by a communications blackout. On 27 October, gunfire between the RSF and other forces were still being exchanged, particularly at the city's perimeter berm, dug by the RSF. The RSF captured El Fasher Airport that day. In the following days, the RSF had captured the entirety of El Fasher.

Civilians were killed in and around shelters for displaced families, hospitals, and homes. Witnesses and medical staff reported that drones, artillery, guns and whips were used in attacks that deliberately targeted civilians, in addition to firing indiscriminately. In the chaos, some were gathered together before being executed. Drones were seen chasing and targeting civilians. Videos show militants shooting civilians at point-blank range and mutilating them, including shattering their skulls. They have also reportedly engaged in sexual violence against women and girls. Other sources reported people being burned alive, extrajudicial executions, and planned attacks on certain ethnic groups. Witnesses recounted RSF fighters in trucks driving over and crushing civilians, sometimes after noticing they were still alive. Some said they saw 40 to 60 or more civilians killed in a singular location at a time. Eyewitnesses recounted the largest site of killing being the Daraja Oula neighborhood where most civilians were sheltering days before the massacre. The RSF "fired on everybody." RSF fighters were also seen looting buildings.

An RSF militant and perpetrator of the massacre performs a V sign in front of victims about to be executed

Witnesses and aid workers said men were separated from women, tortured, and executed on the grounds that they declined forced conscription into the RSF. They have additionally been reported of executing POWs and people with disabilities. Separated women and children were forced to walk on thorns for upwards of ten hours. Images and videos posted to social media by RSF soldiers shows them posing with the dead bodies of civilians, often doing "V signs." Testimony from civilians who had managed to escape the city recounted RSF soldiers threatening those captured for hours on end, keeping them awake by whipping them, often laughing as they committed atrocities. One witness recounted being rounded up by camel-mounted RSF militants with around 200 other men, being taken to a nearby reservoir and subjected to racial slurs before the soldiers began shooting. (Note: The surviving witness, Alkheir Ismail, told a local journalist in Tawila that he had survived this ordeal because one RSF fighter recognized him "from his school days" and allowed him to escape.)

On 26 October, it was estimated that many of the 260,000 people were still captured within the city. By 5 December, however, it was believed that few individuals remained detained in centers within the city. In the outbreak of killings, residents attempted to escape, with some following SAF soldiers in the process of fleeing or deserting the conflict. Refugees who managed to escape reported being ambushed by RSF soldiers, particularly near the berm. The berm's trench itself stopped or slowed many from escaping—with some being executed by RSF militants inside of it—forcing some families to split as younger individuals were able to scale the berm. RSF militants perpetrated violent searches, disappearances of civilians (particularly men), and kidnappings, typically for ransom. Many of those who managed to escape, as well as family of those captured in the city, described receiving phone calls from RSF soldiers demanding ransom in exchange for the safe release of hostages, with sums ranging from $20 to $20,000 USD being reported. It is believed that many have already "desperately" wired money to the RSF. Others unable to pay the sum promised payments, waiting for family from outside the country to provide it. While holding people for ransom between hours and weeks at a time, RSF militants reportedly filmed executions before showing surviving hostages, telling those being extorted that they would save their relatives if they paid.

On 14 November, Mona Rishmawi, a member of the UN Independent International Fact-Finding Mission for Sudan, reported that the RSF had turned the University of El Fasher into "a killing ground" where thousands of civilians had been sheltering and then killed, so much so that there were "bodies piling in the streets and trenches dug in and around the city".

=== Saudi maternity hospital massacre ===
Within the first day of the massacre, the Saudi maternity hospital, the last functioning hospital in the city, saw a sharp influx of wounded individuals. Resources ran so low that, according to doctor testimony, mosquito nets were used in place of gauze. Some of those injured were pregnant women whose stomachs were torn open by projectiles and shrapnel.

Fearing execution, doctors began to escape the hospital, being forced to leave severely injured patients. On 29 October, at least 460–500 doctors, patients and companions of patients were reportedly killed at the Saudi Maternity Hospital. The World Health Organization later confirmed the killings, accusing the RSF of taking four doctors, a pharmacist and a nurse hostage, and demanding ransoms of more than $150,000 USD for their release. Verified videos from inside the hospital showed soldiers killing any civilians still alive. The Sudan Doctors Union said that approximately 1,200 other civilians were killed in other medical facilities.

Following the hospital's looting and destruction, women from El Fasher reported that "pregnant women [gave] birth in the streets."

=== Mass graves and incineration pits ===
Satellite images and open source evidence support reports of mass graves and widespread destruction, showing human sized "objects" and what are believed to be body bags and pools of blood. On 4 November, the Yale HRL found evidence of mass graves outside of a children's hospital, consistent with the findings of previous satellite imagery. Executive Director at the Yale HRL, Nathaniel Raymond, said the RSF were "cleaning up the massacre" in a "systematic effort," and not simply as "emergency burials" BBC Verify corroborated this analysis on 11 November, believing the black smoke emerging from the pits were evidence of the RSF burning bodies before burying them. The Sudan Doctors Network said they had eyewitness accounts of the RSF desperately collecting and burning bodies, sometimes in mass graves. Approximately six weeks after the beginning of the massacre, further analyses indicated that bodies were being collected in piles throughout El Fasher's streets. Satellite evidence reinforced evidence of mass graves and incineration pits. Raymond likened the scenes to a "slaughterhouse."

On 16 December the Yale HRL found further evidence of burning sites, localized around captured sites on the western core of the city. Consistent with report of mass killing sites, these were particularly in the Daraja Oula Neighborhood and around military sites including the 1019th Air Defense Battalion, 271st Air Defense Brigade, and 157th Artillery Division. Other clusters were analyzed in urban farms on the outskirts of the city, particularly along informal roads and the berm, with few further than the berm. The HRL believed this consistent with reports of RSF militants killing and capturing civilians as the fled the city.

=== Starvation ===
The RSF restricted food inflow into the city, causing starvation. This was facilitated by the RSF digging the berm, which prevented inflow of aid. On 29 October, the International Organization for Migration (IOM) reported that 86% of households in Tawila, the closest and largest destination for internally displaced persons (IDP), had "borderline" or "poor" food consumption status. On 3 November, the Integrated Food Security Phase Classification (IPC) reinforced confirmation that a famine was occurring in southwestern areas of Sudan. El Fasher and the southern town of Kadugli, also under siege by the RSF, were classified as Phase 5 "with reasonable evidence."

=== Sexual violence ===
Women and girls were subject to widespread sexual violence by RSF soldiers, as corroborated by witnesses who saw women being taken being out of sight before being assaulted and heard them cry for help. Some minors were reported to be as young as 14 years old. Fighters took women and girls "as a form of currency" or "payment". Testimonies from escapees recounted their clothes being ripped or cut to shreds before they were both raped and gang raped by soldiers. These attacks were particularly violent, with soldiers cutting, beating, and assaulting women and girls. Some sexual violence was so brutal that victims became sick soon after. In a weakened state, their health deteriorated and some later died, even after being treated in clinics in adjacent cities and towns. Victims who survived arrived in camps requesting fetal ultrasounds, with one aid worker's testimony recounting a 15-year-old being 10 weeks pregnant with her first child. Others did not ask for medical care, received pregnancy prevention medicine too late, or contracted HIV or other sexually-transmitted diseases.

Some women which were separated from men were forced to walk to makeshift shelters located over 10km away from El Fasher. RSF soldiers stripped and searched women before detaining them in the shelters. Victims recounted RSF soldiers raping them numerous times per day.

=== Abduction of children ===
In January 2026 Reuters reported that RSF fighters and allied militias had abducted children during the takeover. Some were held for ransom while others were forced to work. Legal experts said the abductions could amount to war crimes and crimes against humanity; they could also constitute enslavement and slave trading.

=== Forcible blood drawing ===
"I saw containers full of blood in a place that seemed like a small clinic. There were many beds separated by curtains, with RSF soldiers withdrawing blood from the victims, who were people fleeing El Fasher."

— "Adam," (Note: "Adam" was a name given by the MEE to hide the identity of the person who gave the testimony.) Middle East Eye

During the massacre and weeks thereafter, RSF militants drew blood from civilian residents it had captured to store for blood transfusions for its soldiers, as reported by the Middle East Eye (MEE) on 26 November 2025. Civilians captured and blindfolded were taken to hospitals and commanders' homes, which had been retrofitted as makeshift blood banks, during which RSF soldiers repeatedly drew blood over a period of many days. One witness recounted seeing over 50 people collected in one center. Another said they "don’t know how much they took." Despite those being held being kept in beds during the draws—during the day, they were forced to cook, clean, and do laundry for RSF soldiers, before being held in small rooms, like dirty bathrooms, throughout the night. Blood was additionally drawn from those fleeing El Fasher, with RSF soldiers capturing civilians, restraining them with ropes, and drawing blood with devices in small ambulance units housed in militants vehicles. One testimony recounts a soldiers telling them: "You’re a slave, don’t worry, you won’t die, we need this for our soldiers." Those captured for blood draws were additionally required to pay ransom for their release. If they were able to do so, many recount fainting repeatedly on the journey out of El Fasher.

The testimonies of victims of the RSF's blood draws were corroborated by local and international aid workers, who had seen many such cases, including before the beginning of the massacre in places like the refugee camp in Zamzam. Alaaeldin Nugud, the spokesperson for the RSF's political arm, Tasis, called MEE's report a "fake media campaign," denying that neither blood nor organs had been taken from civilians. He added that the report belonged to "[many] lies and allegations" which were published following the massacre in El Fasher.

== Death toll ==
=== Estimated figures ===
According to reports on 28 October, more than 2,000 people had been executed, many of them women, children, and the elderly. This was later revised by the testimonies of multiple witnesses to around 10,000 individuals killed in two days. On 4 November, an investigator from the Yale HRL said more people could have died in the 10 days since the massacre began than the 68,000 people confirmed to have been killed during the entire length of the Gaza war, adding "that's not hyperbole". On 21 November, the governor of Darfur, Minni Minnawi, who himself is Zaghawa and lost family members during the massacre, told Middle East Eye that 27,000 Sudanese were killed in the first three days in El Fasher. This was a significant increase from the death toll of over 2,500 estimated by local officials and humanitarian organizations. Kholood Khair of the Khartoum-based Confluence Advisory think-tank estimated that 100,000 people were killed but noted that there were no official figures due to the lack of governance in the region.

=== Verified count ===
According to a February 2026 UN OHCHR report, there were 6,000 documented killings in the three days after the city was taken; the report said "the actual scale of the death toll during the week-long offensive is undoubtedly significantly higher."

== Refugee crisis ==
=== Before the massacre ===
Even prior to the beginning of the massacre, refugees which attempted to flee the city reported paying ransom, encountering RSF patrols, and other violence. Before the fall of El Fasher, Tawila was already a landing ground for many internally displaced persons (IDPs), with Gurni as the first stop along the journey. However, it was largely incapable of tending to its refugee camps as services collapsed and violence grew. The Sudanese American Physicians Association (SAPA) reported that between 18 and 27 October, 3,038 IDPs had fled from El-Fasher to Tawila, with many of them arriving to the town's resources already running thin. This problem was compounded by IDPs arriving with what the SAPA described as "nothing but their lives." The European Commission's Directorate-General for European Civil Protection and Humanitarian Aid Operations (ECHO) estimated that Tawila's population grew from approximately 238,000 to 576,000 between March and September 2025. Médecins Sans Frontières reported that of arrivals to the Tawila refugee camp during the week prior to the fall of city, 5% of children were acutely malnourished, and 26% were severely malnourished. The SAPA warned that Sudan's looming rainy season could constrain aid efforts and intensify the spread of diseases like cholera.

=== After the massacre ===
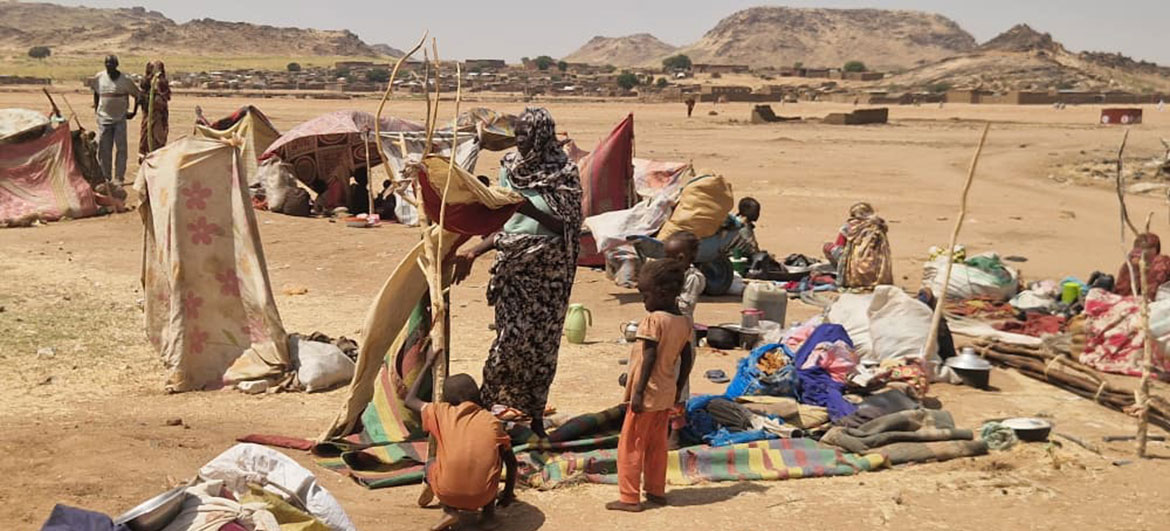
Internally displaced persons (IDPs) fleeing the massacre in El Fasher set up temporary shelters outside of Tawila

As the massacre commenced, people began fleeing the city in droves and the SAPA recorded 3,000 IDP arrivals on 26 October 2025. The next day, on 27 October, 26,030 were recorded, with 7,455 on 28 October. Many of the children who arrived were separated or unaccompanied, believing their parents had gone missing, been detained, or been killed. By 28 October, the UN estimated that more than 26,000 people had fled the city since the beginning of the massacre, mostly to the neighboring town of Tawila, where refugee camps had been established; the crisis that would ensue had already sparked warnings of "genocide." The IOM revised earlier figures from ECHO including new IDPs from El Fasher on 29 October, reporting that between March and September 2025, Tawila's IDP population had grown from 238,084 to 652,079, which amounted to 37% of all IDPs across North Darfur and 7% in all of Sudan. Detailed data described significant shortcomings in refugees' shelters. Throughout following weeks, refugees witnessed continued killings, blockades, and other brutality against those fleeing El Fasher.

By 4 November, the UN High Commissioner for Refugees (UNHCR) suspected that "many others" were still "trapped in the city [El Fasher] without food, water and medical care." Despite providing assistance to refugees, the UNHCR and International Committee of the Red Cross (ICRC) stated aid across the region could not be safely dispatched to those in need, exacerbated by "aid funding sharply declining" causing "essential services [to be] stretched to [the] breaking point." The UN Children's Fund (UNICEF) echoed on 7 November that aid delivery often had "a very narrow window," causing UNICEF to "succeed some days, and other days [not]"—the success rate of which was compounded by the difficulty to remain "neutral and impartial." Its Director of Emergency Operations, Lucia Elmi, said basic aid like bed nets, safe water, and vaccines were still needed.

By 11 November, tens of thousands remained trapped within the city. The IOM reported that hospitals, markets, and water systems collapsed, which both the IOM and UN Women have stated was worsened by continued ground assaults and heavy shelling. Estimating that approximately 90,000 had fled El Fasher, the IOM claimed that the humanitarian situation was "on the brink of collapse," with aid resources depleted, despite local organizations starting emergency projects to provide "shelter kits, protection assistance, and health services," and improve "access to water, sanitation, and hygiene" in already overcrowded camps. UN Women said some refugees were fleeing to the neighboring towns of Korma and Malit, where aid resources were categorized as "scarce."

By 14 November, the UNHCR estimated the refugee figures were nearing 100,000, with Tawila as the largest destination for incoming civilians. By 16 November, the SAPA emphasized that key urgent needs were not being met. This included shelter, food, water, medical care, and protection. In addition, conflict in and around El Fasher made it difficult for aid groups to access those in need or coordinate between one another.

By 22 November, UNICEF recorded the arrival of 354 children unaccompanied by any immediate family members to the refugee camps in Tawila, being able to reunite 84 children with their families thanks to coordination between numerous aid organizations in Tawila. The Norwegian Refugee Council (NRC) recorded upwards of 400 children unaccompanied by any immediate family members, with many being in the care of "extended relatives, neighbors and strangers who didn’t want to leave them alone. The NRC said that "many children arrived with clear signs of hunger," noting their skinny, bony, and dehydrated appearance.

By 27 November, the NRC registered upwards of 15,000 new arrivals in Tawila since 26 October, including an average of 200 or more children every day. One teacher with the NRC noted children showed "signs of acute trauma" as they struggled with speaking, had nightmares, and described hours of traumatic, chaotic travel fleeing the city. Refugees across the region nevertheless reported needing to work for enough funds to sustain their families. This was due to refugees arriving to refugee camps virtually empty-handed as RSF fighters stripped individuals of their money, phones, and clothes at checkpoints—collecting ransom money through video calls. Despite nearly a month since the beginning of the massacre, Denise Brown and Thomas Fletcher of the UN, continued to express that aid organizations still did not "have enough of anything." Brown argued countries and donors' lack of funding created the "yawning shortfall," especially considering the UN, as "one of the best funded humanitarian responses in the world," was only at 28% of the funding it needed. In addition to needing psychological support for women who had suffered sexual violence, both Brown and Fletcher argued that aid organizations needed safe, non-militarized humanitarian corridors.

On 10 December 2025, Mamadou Dian Balde of UNHCR expressed concern for a significant population of displaced people, still attempting to flee the conflict in El Fasher, becoming trapped in rural areas outside the city. These refugees were stopped in areas like Korma, Jebel Wana and Garni by RSF militants–many falling victim to their ongoing, systematic and wide-scale campaign of kidnappings, with their families being extorted for ransom. The UNHCR has called for urgent action to end violence in and around the city to facilitate free movement and so that humanitarian aid can become safely accessible for those in need.

== Investigations ==
=== Academic research ===
On 22 November 2025, the Yale HRL published analyses of satellite data of El Fasher. The researchers found activities consistent with the burning of human bodies at locations consistent with RSF mass killings. They found signs of five traditional burial mounds and two possible mounds during 26–28 October 2025. In seven markets that were either major El Fasher markets or near locations with large civilian populations, they found no signs of activity in November satellite images. The researchers concluded from the likely disposal of bodies by burning, the lack of traditional burials, and the lack of market activity that the 250,000 civilians who remained after 26 October had been "killed by RSF, died, been displaced, or persist[ed] in hiding".

In December 2025, the BBC reported of Yale HRL's investigation, that claims the Rapid Support Forces (RSF) were trying to cover up evidence for the massacre committed. Based on analysis by the HRL of satellite images of the area, the research team says the RSF were covering up the massacre by burying and burning bodies, disposing of thousands of bodies that way.

=== Legal ===
==== International Criminal Court investigation ====
The International Criminal Court (ICC) said in early November 2025 that it was working to "preserve and collect relevant evidence for its use in future prosecutions" as part of its Darfur investigation and that reported atrocities, "if substantiated, may constitute war crimes and crimes against humanity under the Rome Statute". Earlier, on 6 October 2025, the ICC convicted Ali Muhammad Ali Abd-Al-Rahman (Ali Kushayb) of 27 charges of war crimes and crimes against humanity in 2003 during the Darfur genocide.

==== United Nations report ====
The UN Human Rights Council adopted a resolution on 14 November 2025 asking the UN's Independent Fact-Finding Mission to the Sudan to investigate the killings in El Fasher. The Mission interviewed hundreds of witnesses, including survivors of the massacre, and analyzed videos, satellite images and statements from RSF commanders in the region. Despite several requests for assistance, the Sudanese government refused to cooperate with the inquiry. In February 2026, the Mission released its final report, concluding that the massacre showed indications of a genocide against the Fur and Zaghawa communities. The investigation found that RSF forces had committed three of the prohibited acts listed in the Genocide Convention: deliberate killings, the infliction of serious bodily or mental harm, and inflicting conditions of life meant to bring about the destruction of a protected group.

== Reactions and response ==
=== Domestic ===
==== Rapid Support Forces ====
Alaaeldin Nugud, the spokesperson for Tasis, the political arm of the RSF, denied the atrocities, stating that there have been "much lies and allegations" since the city was taken. Although Hemedti admitted that "abuses" had been committed by the RSF, as of 30 November 2025, the RSF has rejected accusation of systemic abuses against civilians. He apologized for potential civilian deaths and said that the RSF will protect civilians, despite saying that Sudan would be united "through peace or war." RSF leadership claimed to have undertaken an independent investigations into the attack, supposedly resulting in the arrest of several fighters. It also said that it helped civilians leave the city, published videos handing out aid, and called on aid organizations to help those which remained. Hemedti called on fighters to do the same in addition to releasing any detainees.

A high-level RSF commander claimed that the SAF fueled "media exaggeration" regarding the raid "to cover up for their defeat and loss of al-Fashir [El Fasher]." He said that "there were no killings as has been claimed" despite Reuters having verified at least three videos of RSF-uniform soldiers executing unarmed captives as of 31 October. Dr Ibrahim Mukhayer, an advisor to Hemediti, clarified that "looting, killings, sexual violence, or mistreatment of civilians—do not reflect our directives" and that any fighter caught doing so would be "held fully accountable." Victims recounted, however, that RSF soldiers were more brutal when their commanding officers were not around, likely to avoid accountability.

RSF Brigadier General al-Fateh Abdullah Idris, commonly known as Abu Lulu, boasted in unconfirmed videos on 27 October of having killed over 2,000 people. He was seen executing a civilian in another video. After videos featuring Abu Lulu became viral, RSF media subsequently posted images of him under arrest. The arrest has been criticized by Sudanese activists as a publicity stunt. The RSF attempted to further distance themselves from him, with senior RSF sources claiming that "he does not belong to the RSF" but rather a "group fighting alongside" the RSF. They claimed that he would be "held accountable for his actions."

RSF militia commander Shiraz Khalid received the UAE-owned Sky News Arabia anchor, Tsabih Mubarak, on 9 November. Sky News Arabia claimed that the security and humanitarian situation in El Fasher had stabilized. Despite Sky News Arabia being state media, the friendly interaction and hugging between the two nevertheless outraged the Sudanese community. This comes particularly as Khalid has incited RSF fighters to commit war crimes. Weeks prior, videos of Khalid published where she encouraged fighters to rape and impregnate women to "cleanse their lineage." Sky News Arabia's de facto owner Sheikh Mansour bin Zayed Al Nahyan, (Note: Sky News Arabia is a joint venture between the UAE-based International Media Investments (IMI) corporation and the UK-based Sky News. IMI is a subsidiary owned entirely by Abu Dhabi Media Investment Corporation (ADMIC), which is a private investment of Al Nahyan.) who is the Vice President of the UAE and a member of the ruling Abu Dhabi family, has met RSF's Hemedti and funded RSF operations in Sudan.

==== Sudanese Armed Forces ====
In an address on 27 October, the day El Fasher was captured, al-Burhan first accused the RSF of killing civilians. The SAF have accused the RSF of targeting mosques and aid workers.

In response to Sky News Arabia's anchor Mubarak likely being granted safe passage into El Fasher by the RSF, the Sudanese Ministry of Culture, Information, and Tourism banned the channel from operating within Sudan. The Ministry stated that it made the decision on the basis that Sky News Arabia had not been granted official accreditation.

=== International ===
==== United Nations ====
UN Secretary-General António Guterres called the fall of El Fasher a "terrible escalation" in violence and urged foreign countries to stop giving weapons or support to the fighting groups. The UN asked for a safe route so civilians can escape the city. The Office of the UN High Commissioner for Human Rights (OCHA) reported cases of people being killed without trial and ethnic motivations behind the killings.

The UNHCR warned that growing violence in El Fasher forced thousands of people to flee, while many others are trapped in heavy fighting. Fletcher compared the violence to that of the Darfur genocide, and said, "El Fasher, already the scene of catastrophic levels of human suffering, has descended into an even darker hell." Sudan representative for UNICEF, Sheldon Yett, compared it to the Rwandan genocide.

Avatar of Tom Fletcher

Tom Fletcher
(@UNReliefChief)
tweeted:

Unspeakable suffering in Tawila.

Over half of the fleeing survivors are children. One injured woman I met walked into the camp after surviving an attack, carrying her friend's starving child.

They're asking the world if help is coming.

16 November 2025

From approximately 10 to 16 November, the UN Office for the Coordination of Humanitarian Affairs' (OCHA) Fletcher travelled to Darfur for a week long visit to see the state of the humanitarian crisis, document it, and meet with RSF officials. Prior to arriving in a remote town in Darfur nearby El Fasher, Fletcher's UN vehicle was struck by a drone prior to meeting RSF leadership. Senior RSF officials pledged to let the UN enter El Fasher to deliver aid to its civilians and investigate atrocities. Fletcher commented that although details by the end of the meeting were not solidified, the UN's entry would "likely [be] a matter of days, not months." He underscored that the UN and relevant parties must "be careful" that the RSF did not have a say in the delivery and destination of aid. During his visit, he described the suffering of displaced individuals as "unspeakable."

In February 2026, The UN Security Council imposed sanctions on four RSF leaders for atrocities committed in el-Fasher: deputy commander Abdul Rahim Hamdan Dagalo and Brigadier General Al-Fateh Abdullah Idris, RSF deputy commander Gedo Hamdan Ahmed and field commander Tijani Ibrahim. A spokesman for the RSF-linked Tasis coalition dismissed the measures as unfair and based on what he called biased reporting.

==== United States ====
The U.S. senior advisor for Arab and African affairs, Massad Boulos, expressed a deep disturbance regarding the attacks, calling them "abhorrent and unacceptable," urging the RSF to "immediately halt attacks, protect civilians, and ensure safe passage for those fleeing violence" in posts on Twitter. Lawmakers called for the RSF to be designated a terrorist organization. Senator Jeanne Shaheen said she would probably support a terrorism designation, and criticized the UAE for its support of the RSF.

Following a G7 ministerial meeting, on 12 November, Marco Rubio remarked to the press that the US government was aware of who was arming the RSF. He did not mention the UAE, but called for international action to cut weapons supply to the RSF. He furthermore recognized that murder, rape, and sexual violence against civilians had occurred in El Fasher. When asked if he would support a bipartisan Senate effort to designate the RSF as a Foreign Terrorist Organization, Rubio commented that "the RSF has concluded that they’re winning and they want to keep going." He added that the refugee outflow from El Fasher was lower than "anticipated," indicated that they were either "dead or because they’re so sick and so famished that they can’t move." The possibility that El Fasher's residents were either dead or on the brink of death, Rubio said, was "weighing" on the US as they formulated a response to the crisis.

On 19 February 2026, the US Department of the Treasury's Office of Foreign Assets Control placed treasury sanctions against RSF commanders for their participation in the massacre. These included Abu Lulu, Gedo Hamdan Ahmed Mohamed ("Abu Shok"), and Tijani Ibrahim Moussa Mohamed ("Al Zeri Salem"), all of whom were filmed committing killings.

==== United Arab Emirates ====
The United Arab Emirates (UAE) has served as the RSF's principal backer, supplying money, weapons, and logistical assistance. That support enabled the RSF to continue major offensives, including the prolonged battle for El-Fasher. The events triggered a surge of criticism over the role of the UAE, but this did not affect Emirati support.

The UAE condemned the massacre, announced AED 367.25 million in aid, and called for warring parties to exercise restraint and cease targeting civilians. UAE Senior Diplomatic Envoy Anwar Gargash stated that it was a collective mistake by the international community after the 2021 Sudanese coup d'état to not have placed sanctions on the RSF and SAF.

==== Other international reactions ====
Intergovernmental organizations (IGO) expressed deep concern about and condemnation of the violence and killings, including calls for cessation of killings, aid distribution, and accountability for those responsible. IGOs which published comments include the African Union, European Union, and World Health Organization.

Representatives from countries did the same. This included Germany, Belgium, Pope Leo XIV (of Vatican City), and France. International and domestic NGOs did the same. This included Human Rights Watch, Amnesty International, the Global Centre for the Responsibility to Protect, and Human Rights Research Center.

In December 2025, the United Kingdom imposed sanctions on four senior RSF commanders, namely Abdul Rahim Dagalo, Gedo Hamdan Ahmed, Brigadier General Al-Fateh Abdullah Idris; and Field Commander Tijani Ibrahim Moussa Mohamed, over their role in the massacre.

== Analysis ==
=== Warnings ignored before the massacre and arms trade complicity ===
Experts from The New Humanitarian (TNH), the Council on Foreign Relations (CFR), Vision of Humanity (VoH), the US Holocaust Memorial Museum (USHMM), and others have underscored how months of warnings regarding the siege of El Fasher, if heeded, could have prevented the massacre. Leading up to the RSF's overrunning of the city and subsequent execution of the atrocity, civilians trapped inside were labelled as collaborators of the SAF and pro-SAF forces. Human rights expert Alex de Waal said the massacre was "very similar to what they [the RSF] did in Geneina [in early 2023] and elsewhere" during the early 2000s. He and other experts had long warned that the RSF would perpetrate ethnic violence against indigenous African groups, and has done so for 20 years prior—especially following the takeover of El Fasher. This was later echoed by Minnawi, claiming Sudanese warnings were "belittled."

Days before the massacre, SAF fighters defending El Fasher were reported to have coordinated and paid RSF fighters leading the siege to ensure safe exit from the city.

Experts have criticized the international community, particularly the United States, of sanctioning belligerents but failing to apply effective pressure on countries financing and arming them. Amnesty International urged the African Union (AU), UN, regional actors, and other international actors to "act swiftly to prevent further civilian suffering." In light of the "horrifying" massacres, it called for all parties responsible for the atrocities to be held "individually accountable." In a press release regarding the massacre, it raised concerns about the United Kingdom's complicity in arms sales to the UAE, which have been found in the hands of the RSF. Despite the UNSC having received material indicating that the UAE supplied UK-produced arms to the RSF, the UK—being the "penholder" for the issue in the UNSC—went on to send similar arms to the UAE months later. Weaponry included sophisticated arms including drones, guided munitions, and howitzers. Other experts and officials also criticized the National Basketball Association (NBA), Disney, and states for their business partnerships with the UAE, which Minnwai portrayed as the UAE's "lip service" to “manipulat[e] the international community diplomatically.”

=== Social and diplomatic implications ===
The events in El Fasher have increased pressure for aid and diplomacy in Sudan. The massacre has become a symbol of the wider violence after peace efforts collapsed and may render a negotiated deal unlikely in the near future.

=== Legal ===
Scholar Sanmay Moitra argued that the UN has a legal obligation to prevent genocide in El Fasher and that it is "obliged to, and must, intervene in [El Fasher] with force" under Chapter VII of the UN Charter. He noted, however, that this last resort was reached only because the UN "repeatedly ignored warning signs and omitted to take decisive and effective action not involving the use of force at a time when those options were still available." Other experts have argued the massacres could be considered war crimes.

=== Indirect deaths following the massacre ===
International groups had warned of a major disaster, mass killings, rape, hunger, and displacement affecting more than 14 million people in Darfur by late 2025.

=== Control of Darfur towards RSF statehood ===
The capture of El Fasher gave RSF control over all five capitals in Darfur in addition to much of the Western Darfur territory. Some warned of a possible partition of Sudan through the establishment of a de facto state. However, Armed Conflict Location and Event Data (ACLED) commented that for the foundation of an alternative government, the RSF would likely need to capture much of the Kordofan region, which the SAF and its allies are working to secure.

== See also ==
- 21st-century genocides#2023–present: Sudan
- Darfur genocide
- Human rights in Sudan
- List of ethnic cleansing campaigns
- List of genocides
- List of massacres in Sudan
- Masalit massacres (2023–present)
- Politics of Sudan
- Sudanese civil war (2023–present)
  - War crimes during the Sudanese civil war (2023–present)
    - January 2025 Saudi Hospital attack
    - Darfur genocide (2023–present)
- Sudanese refugee crisis
