= Abdul Rahim Dagalo =

Sudanese military officer, former warlord and Janjaweed mercenary

Lieutenant General Abdul Rahim Dagalo
- عبدالرحيم دقلو

Personal details
- Born: 1 January 1972 (age 54)
- Relations: Hemedti (brother); Algoney (brother)
- Known for: Khartoum massacre

Military service
- Allegiance: Rapid Support Forces
- Rank: Lieutenant General
- Commands: Deputy leader of the RSF
- Battles/wars: War in Darfur; Sudanese civil war (2023–present): Siege of Babanusa; Siege of El Fasher

Abdul Rahim Hamdan Dagalo Musa (Arabic: عبدالرحيم حمدان دقلو موسى) is a Sudanese military officer who is the deputy leader of the Rapid Support Forces (RSF), a paramilitary organisation in Sudan. His political influence grew as he became the RSF's deputy leader in 2018, establishing strong ties within the former Bashir regime. He played a role in the killing of the protesters during the 2019 Sudanese revolution.

Abdul Rahim is the older brother of Mohamed Hamdan Dagalo, also known as Hemedti, the commander of the Rapid Support Forces (RSF). Abdul Rahim initially served in the border guards, rising to colonel when the RSF was established in 2013. Alongside his military career, the Dagalo family ventured into commercial activities, including mining and gold prospecting, notably with Al-Junaid Company.

In April 2023, as the RSF clashed with Sudan's armed forces, he faced international sanctions for alleged human rights abuses. Abdul Rahim defended himself, claiming the sanctions were unjust, while the US stressed the need for accountability.

== Biography ==
Dagalo was born on 1 January 1972. (Note: Many Sudanese citizens born before 2000 might not have birth certificates, especially those from rural areas where such documents were unavailable at the time. To address this, individuals can get a confirmation from the Birth Registry stating that their birth is not recorded. They can then present this confirmation to the health commission to receive a substitute health document, which will indicate their age but not their place of birth. Typically, this document lists the date of birth as 1 January, with the estimated birth year, e.g., Jaafar Nimeiry, Abdalla Hamdok, Omar al-Bashir, and Abdin Mohamed Ali Salih.) According to Al Jazeera Arabic, Abdelrahim Hamdan Dagalo was born in South Darfur. Yet, according to the BBC, The Guardian and Al Jazeera English, the Dagalo family are from Chad and migrated to Sudan in the 1980s, to escape from war and drought. Abdelrahim hails from the Mahamid clan of the Arab Bedouin Rizeigat tribe, known for trade and herding. He is the brother of Mohamed Hamdan Dagalo, known as Hemedti, the commander of the Rapid Support Forces (RSF).

Abdelrahim initially served in the Border Intelligence Brigade, composed mainly of Arab tribes, used by the former President Omar al-Bashir's regime in the Darfur conflict. He rose to the rank of first sergeant and later became a colonel when the RSF was established in 2013.

Parallel to his military career, the Dagalo family engaged in extensive commercial activities, founding mining and gold prospecting firms, notably Al Junaid, with operations spanning Khartoum, Darfur, and other locations in Sudan.

Abdelrahim's political influence grew after becoming the deputy leader of the RSF in 2018. He built strong relationships within the Bashir regime, particularly with security leaders, enhancing the RSF's authority. During the 2018 protests, Abdelrahim initially played a role in protecting demonstrators and contributed to the downfall of the Bashir regime, but he is accused of ordering the Khartoum massacre at the General Command sit-in in June 2019.

=== 2023 Sudan war ===
The conflict emerged four years after the ousting of President Omar Al-Bashir, stemming from tensions between the army and RSF, which jointly staged a coup in 2021. Sudan's military ruler, General Abdel Fattah al-Burhan, issued a decree to dissolve the RSF, a move contested by Hemedti. After the RSF clashed with the Sudanese army in April 2023, Abdelrahim's videos circulated, confirming his leadership role. He left Sudan, traveling through Darfur, Chad, and Kenya.

In September 2023, Dagalo faced international sanctions due to his alleged connection to human rights abuses and other war crimes during the war in Sudan. The sanctions against Dagalo come amid ongoing conflict between the RSF and Sudan's army, particularly in West Darfur, where the RSF and allied militias are accused of violence. These sanctions are primarily in response to alleged human rights abuses associated with Dagalo and his role in the RSF, as well as his connection to businesses, such as a gold mining company, which have also faced sanctions. These sanctions followed a decision by Abdel Fattah al-Burhan to dissolve the RSF, revoke its independence, and allow legal prosecution for its members.

Dagalo stated that the sanctions were unfair and lacked a clear investigation. US Ambassador to the United Nations, Linda Thomas-Greenfield, defended the sanctions, emphasising the need for justice and accountability for atrocities committed against the Sudanese people.

Dagalo also claimed that the RSF had acquired significant stores of weapons and supplies that could last for two decades. Meanwhile, Sudan faces a humanitarian crisis, with millions of people in need of assistance, and a large number of refugees fleeing to neighbouring countries, including Chad, Central African Republic, Egypt, Ethiopia, and South Sudan. The United Nations has appealed for substantial funding to address the humanitarian needs in Sudan, but it has only secured a fraction of the required amount to date.

On 2 April 2025, Dagalo threatened that the RSF would launch an invasion of states in Northern Sudan after recent defeats in east of the country.

In November 2025, the Foreign Affairs Council of the European Union took restrictive measures against Dagalo for violations committed by his troops, including during the El Fasher massacre. In December 2025, the United Kingdom imposed sanctions on Dagalo and three other senior RSF commanders over their role in the El Fasher massacre. In February 2026, Dagalo and three other senior RSF commanders were also sanctioned by the United Nations on similar charges. Dagalo was caught on film instructing his fighters to "leave nobody alive," in El Fasher.
