= Kutum =

Kutum كتم
- Town
- Location in Sudan
- Coordinates: 14°12′20″N 24°39′0″E
- Country: Sudan
- State: North Darfur
- Control: Rapid Support Forces

Government
  - Governor: Nimir Mohammed Abdelrahman

Population (2006)
  - Total: 45,000

Kutum is a town in the Sudanese state of North Darfur. It lies 120 kilometers (75 mi) northwest of the state capital, Al-Fashir. The town is located along a wadi and therefore also known as Wadi Kutum. It lies north along the Marrah Mountains; the Kutum volcanic field is better known as the Tagabo Hills. As of 2006, it had a population of 45,000, predominantly of the Fur, Tunjur and Berti ethnicities. Kutum lies on one of the traditional north–south migration routes used by Darfuri pastoralists.

== Facilities ==
The town hosts a local market which operates on Mondays and Thursdays. Other facilities in the town includes a hospital with basic medical and surgical services and a small botanical gardens alongside the Wadi and the market. Within the town two primary health care clinics also operate.

The town hosts a number of mosques, with the mosque at the market having a notable minaret.

Commercial services includes bakeries, groceries, public phone outlets, as well as mechanical services. As of November 2006 no formal banking services were available in the town.

Electricity is available a few hours most days from a communal generator. For most of the population, water is fetched from wells around the town.

== History ==
From September to November 1989, during the Chadian–Libyan conflict, Kutum was briefly occupied by Chadian forces.

Kutum is a city in North Darfur state, inhabited primarily by the non-Arab Fur people, with minorities of non-Arab Tunjur and Berti groups. The city lies on a route often used by nomadic Arab tribes, and as a result, many of the villages around Kutum are populated by Arab groups.

Throughout the war in Darfur, while mostly government-controlled, the ethnic groups of the inhabitants are associated with the rebel groups, and the town was briefly taken by the rebels in August 2003. Kutum was a hotbed of anti-Bashir activity, and was the site of several battles between various rebel groups, including the Sudanese Liberation Army and National Redemption Front, against Janjaweed and Sudanese armed forces. The area northeast of town is largely controlled by the rebel Sudan Liberation Movement, while 'Arab' militias such as the Janjaweed are to the south and west. Janjaweed also attacked non-Arab civilians in Kutum throughout the war. In the late 2010s, these attacks became sporadic, and occurred against civilians in central Kutum.

Two camps for internally displaced persons, Fatta Borno and Kassab, formed near the town. In 2018, many refugees returned to Kutum, as attacks were dying down in the area. Following the end of the war in Darfur in 2020, attacks continued by gunmen in and around Kutum. Many refugees in Kutum live in Kassab refugee camp, just north of the town.

Following the Sudanese revolution, Nimir Mohammed Abdelrahman was appointed governor, and Mohammed Hassan Arabi was dismissed.

The Battle of Kutum broke out in the War in Sudan (2023) and ended with a RSF victory gaining control of the town. On March 17, Hemedti threatened to dismantle IDP camps across Sudan, including those in Kutum.
