= Hawazma tribe =

Tribe in North and South Kordofan, Sudan

Hawazma
- Ethnicity: Baggara Arab
- Nisba: Al-Hazimi
- Location: North Kordofan (southern part); South Kordofan
- Descended from: Juhaynah of the Hejaz
- Branches: Abd al Ali, Halafa, Dar Bkhoot, Dar Neilla
- Language: Sudanese Arabic
- Religion: Sunni Islam

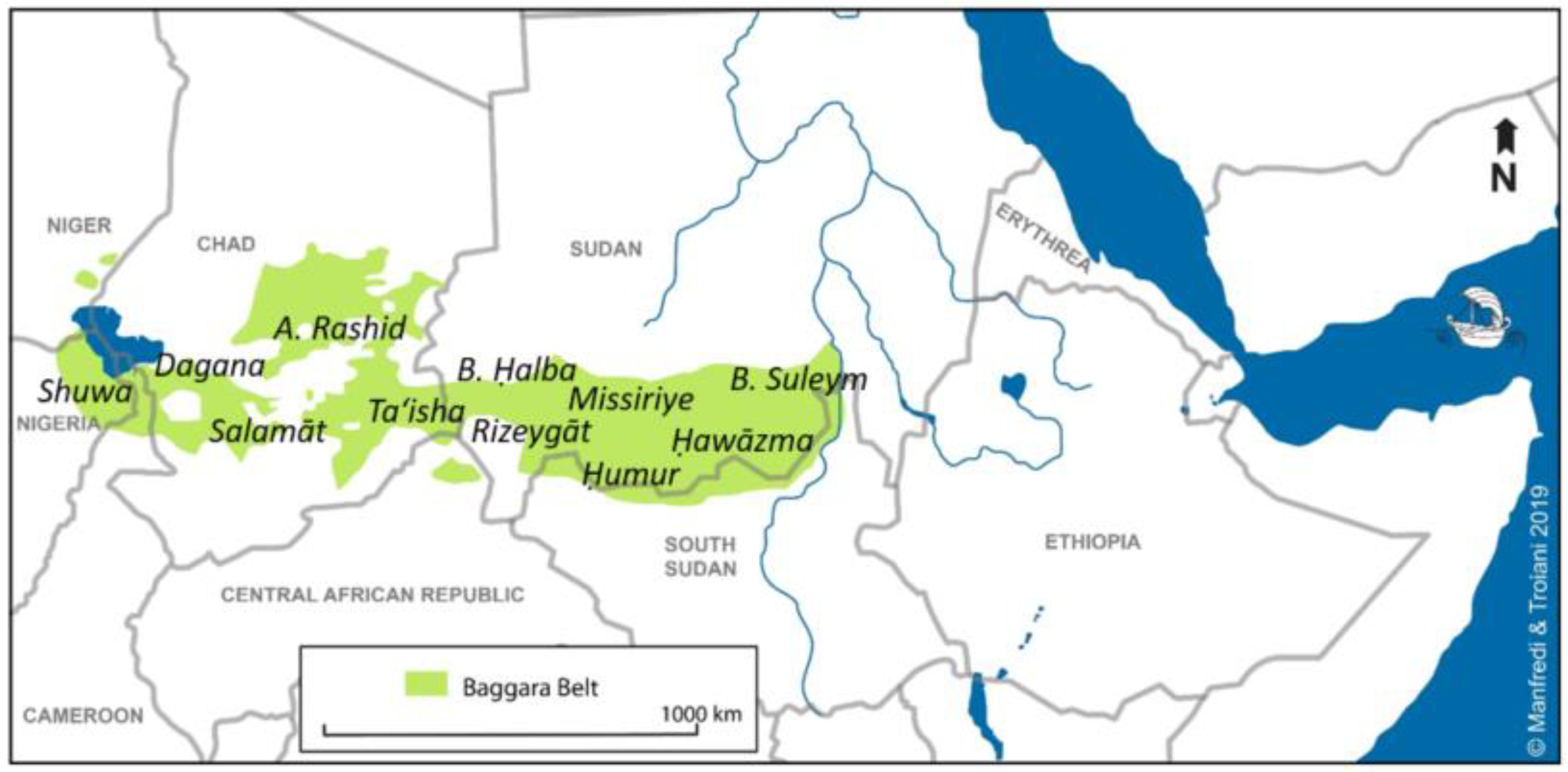
Baggara belt.

Hawazma, part of Sudan's Baggara tribe, are cattle herders who roam the area from the southern parts of North Kurdufan to the southern borders of South Kurdufan, a distance of about 300 kilometers. Through their nomadic movement, the Hawazma know the area, terrain, ethnic groups, local tribes, tribal cultures, ecosystems, climate, vegetation, existence of risks and diseases, and water resources better than any other inhabitants of the region. The term Baggara is a collective name applied to all cattle-herding tribes with Arab roots. Cattle herders from Nuba tribes are not called Baggara. Cattle herders of middle and eastern Sudan, although they are Arab in roots, are also not Baggara. The Baggara occupy a wide area, from Kordofan, Mid-Western Sudan, to Darfur in the far Western Sudan and extending to neighboring Chad. They are a collection of seven major tribes: Hawazma, Messiria Humr Messiria Zurug, Rizeigat, Ta’isha, Habbaniya, Beni Halba, Awlad Himayd, and Beni Selam. All Baggara have similar physical facial features, costumes, dance, religion, food, and in general a common culture and way of life.

== Origins ==
The Hawazma are believed to have migrated to Sudan during early days of Islamic missionaries to Africa as part of Baggara Arabs, perhaps as early as the 12th century. Most historians believe they belong to the Juhayna group; a clan of Bedouin Arabs which migrated from Saudi Arabia. Hawazma traditional historians say they originally came from the Arabian Peninsula to Egypt then followed the River Nile until they settled on Jebel Awliyya part of Khartoum Province and as the grazing land became scarce and overcrowded they gradually moved to Western Sudan. These stories correspond well with the presence of scores of Hawazma in Kosti, Middle Sudan, Um Rowaba, Eastern part of Kordofan and Al Rahad, middle-eastern part of Kordofan. The journey continued beyond Kordofan, to Darfur on the Western Sudan and today they have reached Chad, the country on western border of Sudan.

According to British colonial administrator Harold MacMichael, in the mid-eighteenth century in the days of the Funj, heads of families from six tribes, finding themselves unable to stand alone, came to the Hawazma and asked for protection and agreed to join the Hawazma. The leaders of these groups swore an oath binding themselves to the Hawazma, and they were referred to henceforth as the Halafa. The six tribes that formed the Halafa subgroup of the Hawazma: the Bedaria, Takarir, Jellaba Howara, Zenara and Nuba.

== Seasonal migration and tribal distribution ==
The Baggara are a nomadic people of Sudan, characterized by seasonal north–south migration. Their migration routes follow a fixed cycle pattern, usually moving along two permanent paths (north-south and south–north), which do not overlap with each other and remain unchanged for generations. The route of the Hawazma tribe, for example, runs from the city of Al Obeid in North Kurdufan, east of Dilling and east of Kadugli, to the Talodi area; The Messiria tribe is located on its western side, bordering the Humr tribe. Due to the long-term adaptation to settlement and intermarriage with African tribes, some Baggara tribes (such as Hawazma and others) have become significantly different from traditional Bedouin Arabs, some Hawazma are darker skinned, close to the Nuba, and speak a Nuba dialect; Traces of mixed origins remain in tribal names. Other Hawazma maintain a typical Arab appearance, such as light brown skin and bushy eyebrows.

== Socio-economic factors: pastoralism and agriculture ==
This picture typical of Hawazma Baggara when reach North Kurdufan in their north journey out of the muddy land of South Kordofan

When Hawazma families lose their herds they settle. Generally, Hawazma settled in villages or established villages from southern parts of Al Obeid city in Northern Kordofan to Talodi city in South Kordofan. Those who settled in northern border of South Kordofan or Southern border of North Kordofan are mostly Gumaiyya, including: Gumaiyya Kilaibab, Gumaiyya Al Hussienat, and Gumaiyya Matrafia, in addition to other Hawazma Oulad Gaboush and Dar Niayylie. These subtribes intermarried with Bidaria and Mosabaat and other Kordofanian tribes. Their lifestyle closely resembles the Kordofanian tribes. Mostly engaged in raising crops and cattle. Notably their Hawazma Arabic Accent is inclined to include Kordofanian Arabic accents. Similarly, they adopted a way of cultivation, crop tending, and harvesting similar to those other Kordofanian tribes. They used a long-handled spade called Jarrieh and Saloqqa, they tend their farm while standing, not similar to those of Hawazma deep in South Kordofan who tend while they are sitting on their heels. Their crops include: millet, watermelon, groundnuts, sesame and hibiscus.

This picture typical of Hawazma Baggara cow boys, in North Kurdufan

Those who settled in the middle of South Kordofan in Kadugli and its suburb, include: Gumaiyya Nafar Balal, Gumaiyya Nafar Ayyad, Gumaiyya Nafar Adam and others. These who settled around the Deling city and its suburb are mostly Hawazma Dar Niayylie. Both groups have adopted the mainstream Hawazma way of life and their Hawazma Arabic accents. In terms of agricultural practices, they grow sorghum, sesame, cotton and okra. They mostly use tools such as Sollucab for seeding and Antabab and axe for clearing shrubs and trees. Mostly cultivate by uprooting grasses with their bare hands. These are among the most victimized Hawazma during this civil wars. On the southern parts of South Kordofan, settled Hawazma Al Rawawqa. Al Rawawqa subtribe embodies large subtribal diversity. Among the most prevalent are Rawawqa Oulad Nuba. These are group of Hawazma who most resembles Nuba in most of their living habits and agricultural practices. They cultivate with Jarrieh a Nuba developed tool, tend while sitting on their heels. Mostly grow sorghum, sesame, and groundnuts and gather wild okra. Again these are among the most victimized Hawazma in the region.

On the eastern side of South Kordofan, lives Hawazma Darbettie, now separated from those living central South Kordofan, due to geographic distance. On the western parts of South Kordofan, no Hawazma live their, it is found our cousins: Messiria, Humr, Rezeigat, Ta'isha and Habbaniya. They have similar lifestyles as Hawazma, and only differentiated by their phonetic accents of Arabic language.

== Character, appearance and costumes ==
Hawazma, like any other Baggara people, have graceful slim physical statues; their skins range from light brown to dark colors. However, although they are referred to as Arabs; phenotypically, the Hawazma and other Baggara peoples are similar to other local indigenous populations. The men wear a white gown called Jallabiyya, white pants (pajamas), a head cap called a tagiatt, big white turbans called eema and locally made leather shoes called marqoub. Men of all ages always carry knives, which are worn on the forceps of the left arm and hidden in a decorated leather covering, carry sticks, spears, sometimes swords or big spears. The women wear a dress called foustan, and cover their bodies with taubes such as Indian sari. Young men wear eye-catching colored flashy shirts, shorts, pants, beads, necklaces, and bracelets. Young women wear foustanff during festivals and dancing to show their ornate braided hairstyles.

== Baggara from a sociological perspective ==
The traditional society of the Baggara is characterized by a high rate of illiteracy. Historically, they have generally resisted formal education, believing that schools alienate children, teach "moral criminality," and distract them from nomadic life, such as herding cattle. As a result, Bagara teenagers usually tend to livestock throughout the day before returning to camp in the evening. The Bagala community has long faced a lack of infrastructure for health and medical conditions, including: lack of clean drinking water, sanitation clinics and electricity; Little contact with modern media such as television and radio; Pregnant women rarely receive prenatal care or professional medical assistance. In addition, female genital mutilation (FGM) is widespread, while facial scarring (Shoulokh), lip adhesions, and traditional hair braids are common body grooming practices for women. Gender division of labor and social roles, in which women perform the primary labor, including milking, cooking, raising children, selling dairy products, building houses, and farming, form the core of the household economy. Men are more likely to be at leisure during the dry season, engaged in recreational activities (such as playing Dala cards), and engaged in limited seasonal work (such as transporting grain to the mill or shopping for household goods). The youth group is interested in festivals, rituals and dances, and is also responsible for supervising the grazing of young children. The Bagara do not raise their cattle primarily for market purposes, but as a symbol of wealth and prestige - an individual's social status is directly dependent on the size of their herd. The work of anthropologist Barbara Michael work is a large contribution to the subject of Hawazma socio-enonomics.

== Beginnings of conflict ==
Beginning in early 1983, radio broadcasts by South Sudanese rebels alarmed the people of South Kordofan and increased tensions in the area.

Soon after, weapons started to appear on the black market. The military started recalling retirees and drafting young men for service. The weapons trade was flourishing with gun sellers roaming the Baggara villages and nomad camps. The militiamen given themselves roles to protect the Baggara camps and fight to defend the villages.

Gaafar Nimeiry's regime began arming Messiria Zurug and Messiria Humr, known as the Muraheleen milita, to balance the rebel attack on Abyei area. The rebels attacked a Chevron Oil Company site, killing four Chevron employees. Also, they attacked the Baggara campuses to acquire cattle for food. Now the war completely broke at southwest of South Kordofan. By the end of Normeri's regime, in 1985, South Kordofan was in chaos although other parts of Kordofan were peaceful.

During, Al Sadiq Al Mahdi era, the Messiria Zurug and Messiria Humr were armored, the paramilitary forces became legal and carrying weapons was legal. Everyone had AK-47 machine gun. During this time rebels attacked the southern part of South Kordofan, especially Gardoud village, around Talodi city. The Baggara were heavily victimized in Gardoud; sixty Baggara were dead, 82 wounded. Religious leaders and Imams, were publicly executed, women were raped, houses were burned and cattle herds were raided. South Kordofan now is a war zone. People evacuated the cities, traders stopped their trades, and all other tribes and ethnic groups not from South Kordofan left the region.

== Civil war ==
In 1987, Yusif Kuwa Mekki entered South Kordofan as commander for the rebels. Immediately war expanded to el Hamra, el Buram, Um Sirdiba and surrounding areas. Hawazma villages were systematically targeted by rebels, killing them as groups, individuals or evacuated them completely as happened in Um Sirdiba. Africa Justice organization provided many reports documenting abuses by SPLA . These reports indicate the worse human rights situation in South Kordofan.

In 1989, Al Boukhas village was completely destroyed and about 40 villages of Hawazma were either attacked or evacuated before the attack and the people left their possessions and crops. By the end of 1989, about 300,000 Baggara were either relocated to big cities or displaced and resettled on the northern border of South Kordofan. For six years, Kuwa war machines (six battalions) were directed to systematic torturing of Baggara tribes, completely destroying their infrastructures and eliminating their educated youth; leaders; and the elite. We have not seen any major attack on military campuses or major military stronghold places in South Kordofan. The war was directed toward Baggara tribesmen.

In January 1990 Abu Safifa village was burned to the ground. By February 1990, only Baggara men stayed on the villages while kids, women and the elderly were displaced or relocated. The war became ethnic cleansings against the Baggara, while the west was still misled with the NGOs, which look after their religious and political agenda in South Kordofan's desperate tribal wars. Rebel guerrilla fighters were looking for excitement in the news by destroying Baggara villages to show their presence, then escape to the mountains tops such as Morou Mountain or Tolishi Mountains.

Nuba militia fighters found a breeding ground in the presence of rebels fighters. Tarrevera militia fighters, from Morou, crossed the road for every vehicle; evacuating Baggara and executing them. They placed road mines and ambushed cars. When mines went off, they would attack; kill or loot goods and then they would escape to mountains or densely forested valleys.

During the military regime of President Omar Hassan al-Bashir, which came to power in June 1989, by revolting against elected Prime Minister Sadiq Al Mahdi government, South Kordofan entered a new phase of the civil war. Islamic jihad war against infidels was completely the norm of life in South Kordofan. Religious decrees (Fatwas) were declared urging people to join the war. The Baggara are 100 percent Muslims and 75 percent of Nuba are Muslims. Then who was the Islamic war against? However, due to the desperation of Baggara, following the unspeakable atrocities by rebels, they sided with the military forces to protect themselves. Soon, Yusuf Kuwa and rebels fighters realized the effect of Baggara on the war balance; basically attributed to their knowledge of the terrain and the intricacies of South Kordofan. The Baggara lead the government forces to caves and hiding places for the rebels. Rebels Commander Yusif Kuwa Mekki started to negotiate with Baggara, either to take side with him or at least to refrain from supporting the government army against the rebels. Yusuf Kuwa succeeded in convening and writing many mutual agreements with local Baggara leaders.

Baggara held good to their agreements. This came to disadvantage the government. The government, thereafter, started a full swing against Baggara, who hold to their agreements by jailing, torturing or killing or forcing them to refrain from any agreements.

As of today, with peace agreement in progress, Baggara has nothing to negotiate. They were used, abused and victimized by the rebels and the Government forces. NGOs never came to Baggara villages to report the atrocities, and probably assumed not deserving any human rights.

== See also ==
- Baggara
