= History of Darfur =

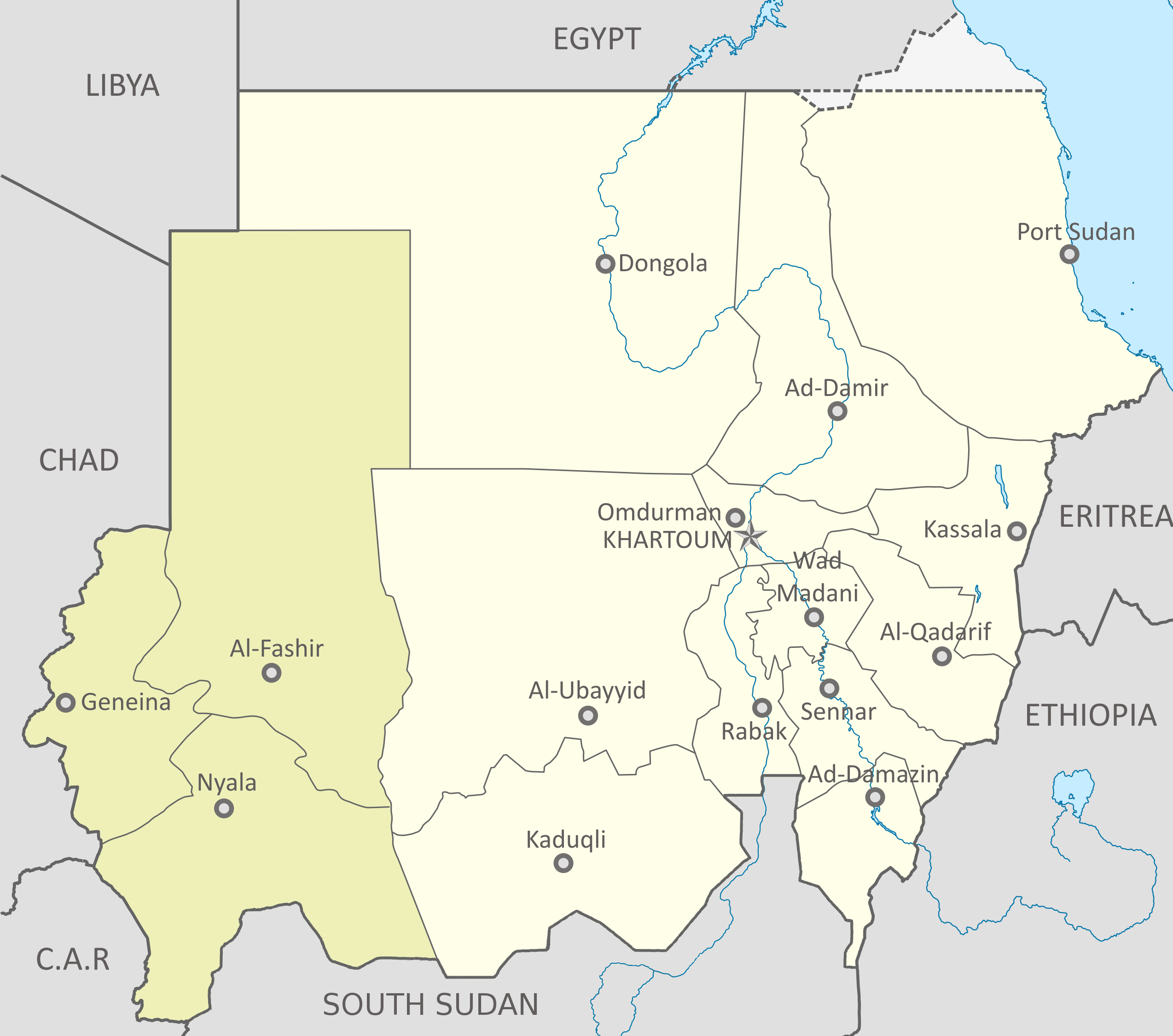
Location of Darfur within Sudan

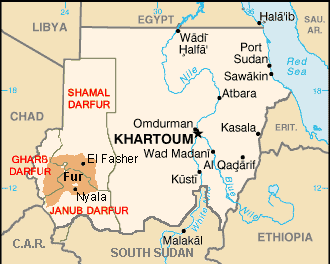
Location of the Fur people within modern Darfur

Throughout its history, Darfur has been the home to several cultures and kingdoms, such as the Daju and Tunjur kingdoms. The recorded history of Darfur begins in the seventeenth century, with the foundation of the Fur Sultanate by the Keira dynasty. The Sultanate of Darfur was initially conquered in 1874 by the Khedivate of Egypt. In 1899, the government of Anglo-Egyptian Sudan recognized Ali Dinar as the Sultan of Darfur, in exchange for an annual tribute of 500 pound sterling. This lasted until Darfur was formally annexed in 1916. The region remained underdeveloped through the period of colonial rule and after independence in 1956. The majority of national resources were directed toward the riverine Arabs clustered along the Nile near Khartoum. This pattern of structural inequality and underdevelopment resulted in increasing restiveness among Darfuris. The influence of regional geopolitics and war by proxy, coupled with economic hardship and environmental degradation, from soon after independence led to sporadic armed resistance from the mid-1980s. Violence in Darfur culminated in an armed resistance movement around 2003.

== Kingdoms of Darfur ==
As the region is composed mostly of semi-arid plains it cannot support a dense population. The one exception is the area in and around the Jebal Marra mountains. It was from bases in these mountains that a series of groups expanded to control the region.

The history of the region is extremely poorly documented, especially the earlier periods. Archaeology has hardly made any progress, in part thanks to the continuing state of warfare which hinders research. Documentary history is also rather sparse, Muhammad al-Idrisi, writing in 1154 is the first author to offer information about the region that provides any concrete detail. The Sicilian geographer describes the Tajuwa as pagans inhabiting the region adjacent to the Nile Valley kingdoms, who possessed two towns, the first and capital being Tajuwa and a second town lying six stages away from it called Samna, which was destroyed according to a traveler in the region, by the governor of the Kingdom of Nuba. The bulk of the inhabitants were nomadic with large numbers of cattle and camels, but subject to raiding by their neighbors.

=== Tora ===
Oral traditions record a race of white giants called Tora, who allegedly reached Darfur from the north, perhaps indicating a Berber origin. They are credited to have introduced monumental stone architecture and sophisticated agriculture. By the 12th century, the Tora had been succeeded by the Daju.

=== Daju Period ===
The Daju – inhabitants of Jebel Marra – appear to have been the dominant group in Darfur in the earliest period recorded. How long they ruled is uncertain with little being known of them save for a list of kings. A. J. Arkell (1959) mentions that the Daju are originally meroites who re-established their capital at Jebel Gadir (Gadir was a Daju king who died and buried beneath this Jebel which is attributed to him) in the Kordofan region. Due to an attack from Nubia about 1100 AD, and for a desire of expansion sultan Ahmed el-Daj relocated his capital to Jebel Marra. He won a battle against the Nubians at Wadi el-Malik and this made him a hero and Emperor for this event the Wadi took his name and his people became known as the Daju. The Nubians attacked the Daju empire again and caused the destruction of the city of Semna east of Al-Fashir. During this period the name of the country was Dardaju (land of the Daju). According to tradition the last sultan experienced a coup after his order to relocate Jebel Um-Kardoos and the Daju dynasty migrated westward after the famous Kasifurogei tale about the 15th century, the Tunjur assumed power and the country was renamed Dartunjur (land of Tunjur). The Egyptian historian al-Maqrizi, writing about 1400, described "Taju" as being a fairly powerful kingdom lying between Kanem and the Nile Valley.

=== The Tunjur ===
The Tunjur reached Darfur by way of Bornu and Wadai. The first Tunjur king is said to have been Ahmed el-Makur, who married the daughter of the last Daju monarch. Ahmed reduced many chiefs to submission, and under him the country prospered. His great-grandson, the sultan Dali, a celebrated figure in Darfur histories, was on his mother's side a Fur, and thus brought the dynasty closer to the people it ruled. Dali divided the country into provinces, and established a penal code, which, under the title of Kitab Dali or Dali's Book, is still preserved, and differs in some respects from Sharia law.

=== Darfur Sultanate ===
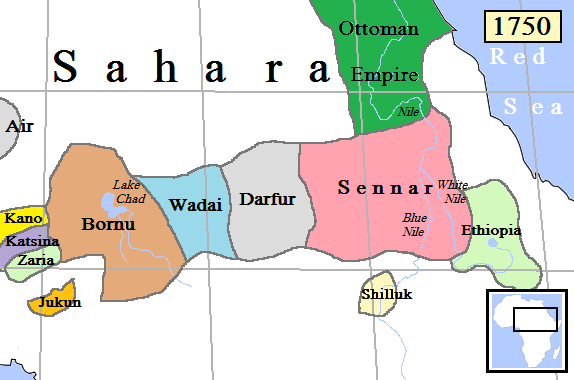
Political entities in the eastern Sahel, circa 1750, with Darfur in grey

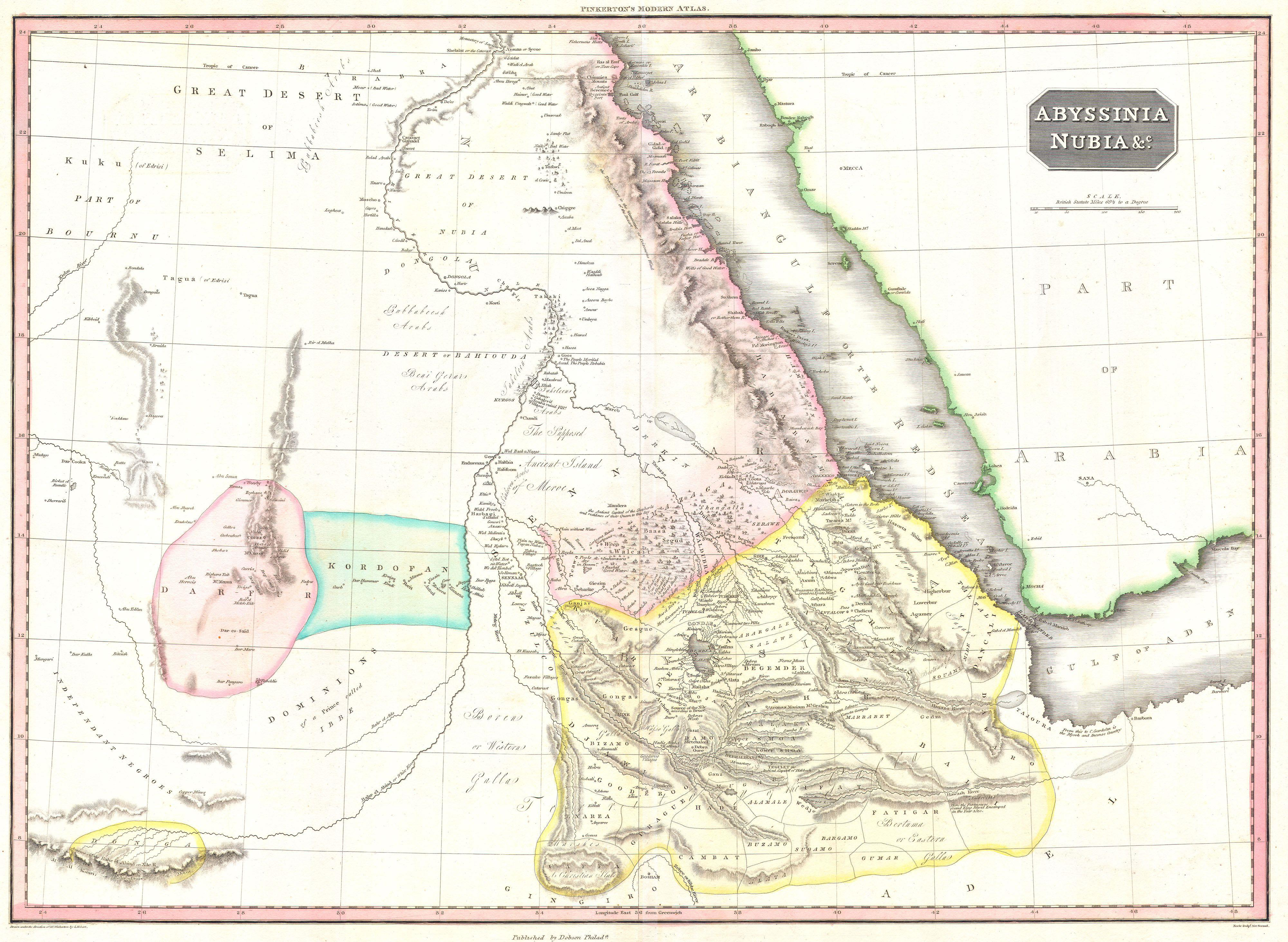
1818 map of "Abyssinia, Sudan and Nubia", with Darfur shaded pink.

Sulayman Solong (or "Sulayman", usually distinguished by the Fur epithet Solon, meaning "the Arab" or "the Red", Browne stated that he was of a Daju origins) reigned from 1603 to 1637, and was a great warrior and a devote Muslim; he is considered to be the founder of the Keira dynasty and the Sultanate of Darfur. Soleiman's grandson, Ahmad Bakr (c. 1682 – c. 1722), made Islam the religion of the state, and increased the prosperity of the country by encouraging immigration from Bornu and Bagirmi. His rule extended east of the Nile as far as the banks of the Atbara. Throughout its history, the sultanate engaged in wars with Sennar, Wadai, Arab tribes and eventually the Egyptians.

In 1856, a Khartoum businessman, Al-Zubayr Rahma Mansur, began operations in the land south of Darfur and set up a network of trading posts defended by well-armed forces and soon had a sprawling state under his rule. This area known as the Bahr el Ghazal had long been the source of the goods that Darfur would trade to Egypt and North Africa, especially slaves and ivory. The natives of Bahr el Ghazal paid tribute to Darfur, and these were the chief articles of merchandise sold by the Darfurians to the Egyptian traders along the Darb el-Arbaʿīn road to Asyut. Al-Zubayr redirected this flow of goods to Khartoum and the Nile.

Sultan Ibrahim challenged al-Zubayr who allied himself with his former enemies the Egyptians. The following war resulted in the destruction of the sultanate. Ibrahim was slain in battle in the autumn of 1874, and his uncle Hassab Alla, who sought to maintain the independence of his country, was captured in 1875 by the troops of the khedive, and removed to Cairo with his family.

== Egyptian rule ==
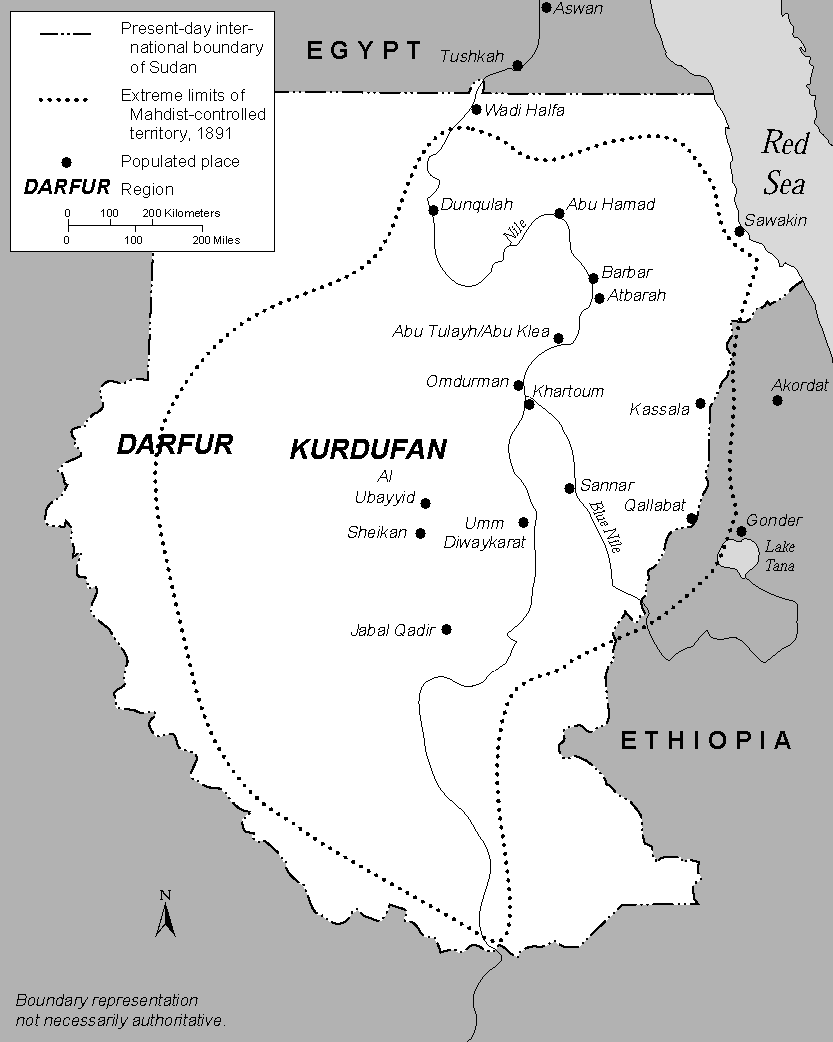
Mahdist state, 1881–98, within modern Sudan's borders

The Darfurians were restive under the rule of Egypt, itself under British control since 1882. Various revolts were suppressed, but in 1879 the British Governor-general of Sudan Charles Gordon suggested the reinstatement of the ancient royal family. This was not done, and in 1881 Rudolf Carl von Slatin was made governor of the province.

Slatin defended the province against the forces of the self-proclaimed Mahdi Muhammad Ahmad, who were led by a Rizeigat Sheikh named Madibbo, but surrendered in 1883 and Darfur was incorporated into the Mahdist State. The Darfurians did not support the Mahdi's rule and found themselves in a state of almost constant warfare that ended in the gradual removal of the Mahdi's forces from Darfur.

Ahmad's successor, Abdallahi ibn Muhammad, was a Darfuri of the minor Ta’isha tribe of cattle-herders. Abdallahi forced warriors of the Western tribes to move to the capital Omdurman and fight for him, sparking rebellions by the Rizeigat and Kababish nomads.

Following the overthrow of Abdallahi at Omdurman in 1898, In 1899, following Abdallahi defeat at Omdurman a year prior, the government of Anglo-Egyptian Sudan recognized Ali Dinar, a grandson of Mohammed-el-Fadhl, as the Sultan of Darfur, in exchange for an annual tribute of 500 pound sterling. Under Ali Dinar – who during the Mahdi's era had been kept as a prisoner in Omdurman – Darfur enjoyed a period of peace and a de facto return to independence.

== British rule ==
Darfur remained independent until the First World War when the Sultan of Darfur, Ali Dinar, pledged allegiance to the Ottoman Empire. Following this the British invaded, and incorporated the region into Anglo-Egyptian Sudan in 1916.

Within Anglo-Egyptian Sudan, the bulk of resources were devoted toward Khartoum and Blue Nile Province, leaving the rest of the country relatively undeveloped. The inhabitants of the river side states, referred to themselves as the awlad al-beled ("children of the country") in pride over their primary role and referred to the Westerners as awlad al-gharb ("children of the west"), an implicit slur. Meanwhile, the "Africans" were pejoratively known as zurga ("Blacks"). Over the course of the Condominium, 56% of all investment occurred in Khartoum, Kassala and Northern Province versus 17% for both Kordofan and Darfur, resulting in about 5-6% in Darfur as Kordofan received the bulk of funds in the West. This was despite the provinces in the Nile Valley having a population of 2.3 million versus 3 million people in the West. Darfur, like the rest of Sudan outside the Nile Valley, remained an undeveloped even as independence was achieved in 1956.

== National independence ==
After independence, it became a major power base for the Umma Party, led by Sadiq al-Mahdi. By the 1960s, some Darfuris were beginning to question the neglect of the region by the Umma, despite their consistent political support. Disillusionment with the religious sect-based parties – Khatmiyya/Democratic Unionist Party in the East and Ansar/Umma in the West – led to a temporary rise of regionally-based parties, including the Darfur Development Front (DDF). During the discussions of the proposed Islamic constitution proposed by Hassan al-Turabi, Muslims from Darfur, the Nuba Mountains and the Red Sea Hills joined the southerners in opposition, perceiving the constitution as a ploy by the center to consolidate their dominance of the marginalized regions. The fracturing of the Umma led to the first political demagoguery attempting to split the "Africans" from the "Arabs" in the 1968 elections, a difficult task as they were substantially intermarried and could not be distinguished by skin tone. Sadiq al-Mahdi, calculating that the Fur and other "African" tribes formed a majority of the electorate, allied with the DDF in blaming "the Arabs" for Darfur's neglect. This left Sadiq's opponent, his uncle Imam Al-Hadi al-Mahdi, courting the Baggara using the rhetoric of "Arabism" to offer hope of somehow being a part of the wealthy center.

Underdevelopment and domestic political tension added to cross-border instability with Chad. Sadiq al-Mahdi allowed FROLINAT – a guerilla movement trying to overthrow President of Chad François Tombalbaye – to establish bases in Darfur in 1969. However, FROLINAT factional infighting killed dozens within Darfur in 1971, leading President of Sudan Gaafar Nimeiry to expel the group. This was further complicated by the interest of new Libyan leader Muammar Gaddafi in the Chadian conflict. Obsessed with the vision of creating a band of Sahelian nations that were both Muslim and culturally Arab, Gaddafi made an offer to Nimeiry to merge their two countries in 1971. However, Gaddafi was disillusioned with Nimeiry's Arab credentials after the Sudanese president signed the 1972 Addis Ababa Agreement, ending the First Sudanese Civil War with the south. Libya claimed the Aouzou Strip, began supporting the FROLINAT against the black Christian Tombalbaye, and supporting Arab supremacist militants to achieve his goals by force, including the Islamic Legion and Tajammu al-Arabi in Darfur, which claimed the province to have an "Arab" nature. Nimeiry, concerned by the warm welcome Gaddafi had given to al-Mahdi, his exiled opposition, began to encourage the fragile administration of Félix Malloum, the new Chadian president after Tombalbaye's 1975 assassination. In retaliation, Gaddafi sent a 1,200-man force across the desert to assault Khartoum directly. The Libyan force was barely defeated after three days of house to house fighting and Nimeiry chose to support the most anti-Libyan of the various Chadian leaders, Hissène Habré, giving his Armed Forces of the North sanctuary in Darfur. All of these external events buffeted the traditional structure of Darfuri society. Tribes that had seen themselves in local terms were asked to declare if they were "progressive, revolutionary Arabs" or "reactionary, anti-Arab Africans". The Khartoum government, rather than trying to calm these new ethnic tensions, instead exacerbated them when it seemed useful in the Sudan-Libya-Chad struggle.

== Civil wars ==
=== Increasing shortage of arable land ===
In 1979, Nimeiry appointed a provincial governor to Darfur who was not from the local population. The appointment of a Nile Valley awlad al-beled, chosen to oversee the support to Habré, sparked riots by Darfuri across Sudan in which three students were killed. Nimeiry relented due to fears that his anti-Libyan bases were being jeopardized.

A major factor in the intensification of the conflict was control over the shrinking supply of arable land. In a longer term cycle, the gradual reduction in annual precipitation, coupled with a growing population, had begun a cycle in which increased use of arable land along the southern edge of the Sahara increased the rate of desertification, which in turn increased the use of the remaining arable land. Drought from the mid-1970s to early 1980s led to massive immigration from northern Darfur and Chad into the central farming belt. In 1983 and 1984, the rains failed. When the Government of Suadan ignored warnings of critical crop failure because they feared it would affect the administration's image abroad, the Governor of the Fur-dominated administration in Darfur resigned in protest. The region was plunged into a horrific famine. When 60,000–80,000 Darfuris walked across the country to Khartoum seeking food, the government declared them to be Chadian refugees and sent them by truck to Kordofan in "Operation Glorious Return", only for them walk back to Khartoum as there was no food in Kordofan. The famine killed an estimated 95,000 Darfuris out of a population of 3.1 million and it was clear that the deaths had been entirely preventable. Attempts by some commentators to attribute subsequent political instability solely to climate change have been firmly rebuffed. A scholar at the Woodrow Wilson International Center noted, "The challenge is to avoid over-simplistic or deterministic formulations that equate climate change inexorably with genocide or terrorism, as some less careful commentators have done."

=== Second Sudanese Civil War in 1983 ===
Political and economic discontent against Nimeiry had been growing for several years leading to him being overthrown on 5 April 1985. Sadiq al-Mahdi came out of exile, making a deal with Gaddafi – which he had no intention of honoring – that he would turn over Darfur to Libya if he was supplied with the funds to win the upcoming elections.

Nimeiry had been heavily supported by the United States and the military junta that had taken power moved quickly to discontinue pro-American policies. Beginning in August 1985, Libya began sending military/humanitarian convoys from Benghazi, including an 800-strong military force that set up base in Al-Fashir and began arming the local Baggara tribes, whom Gaddafi considered to be his local Arab allies. By the time of the 1986 United States bombing of Libya, Libya was providing key logistical and air support to Sudanese offensives against the Sudan People's Liberation Army in southern Sudan. Meanwhile, the famine had severely upset the structure of Darfuri society. The farmers had claimed every available bit of land to farm or forage for food, closing off the traditional routes used by the herders. The herders, faced with watching their animals die of starvation in the desiccated landscape, tried to force the routes south open, attacking farmers who tried to block their path. Small arms were plentiful in Darfur from the various neighboring conflicts and stories spread of herders raiding farming villages for all of their animals or villagers who had armed themselves in self-defense. To Darfuris facing starvation, the concept of African versus Arab began to have explanatory power. Amongst some stationary Africans, the idea that uncaring Arabs in Khartoum had let the famine happen and then Darfuri Arabs armed by their Libyan allies had attacked African farmers began to gain credence. Similarly, semi-nomadic Darfuri Arabs began to seriously consider that Africans had vindictively tried to punish them for the famine by trying to keep them from pastureland and that perhaps the difference between awlad al-beled and awlad al-gharb was not as great as between Arab and zurga.

Regional revenue and expenditure, 1996-2000 averages (% of value for North)
Region	Total expenditure per capita	Total revenue per capita	Effective subsidy per capita	Development expenditure per capita
North	100.0	100.0	100.0	100.0
Central	104.0	134.1	16.8	245.5
Khartoum	161.5	213.7	13.3	532.9
Central ex. Khartoum	60.6	70.9	23.8	35.5
East	73.7	98.4	1.6	79.5
West	44.1	43.9	43.3	17.0
Darfur	40.6	41.5	35.1	17.2
Kordofan	49.9	47.6	57.5	15.5

In December 1991, a Sudan People's Liberation Army force that included Darfuri Daud Bolad entered Darfur in the hopes of spreading the southern rebellion to the West. Before Bolad's force could reach the Marrah Mountains they were attacked by a combined force of regular army and Beni Halba militia mounted on horses. Dozens of Fur villages that had not resisted the SPLA force were burned in reprisal.

In 1994, Darfur was divided into three federal states within Sudan: Northern (Shamal), Southern (Janub), and Western (Gharb) Darfur. Northern Darfur's capital is Al Fashir; Southern Darfur's is Nyala; and West Darfur's is Geneina. The division was the idea of Ali al Haj, Minister of Federal Affairs, who hoped that by dividing the Fur so they did not form a majority in any state that it would allow Islamist candidates to be elected.

=== Fighting in West Darfur in 1998 ===
According to Human Rights Watch, hostilities broke out in West Darfur in 1998. The 1998 clashes, were relatively minor, but more than 5,000 Masalit were displaced. Clashes resumed in 1999 when nomadic herdsmen again moved south earlier than usual.

The 1999 clashes were deadlier, with hundreds killed, including a number of Arab tribal chiefs. The government brought in military forces in an attempt to quell the violence and took direct control of security. A reconciliation conference held in 1999 agreed on compensation. Many Masalit intellectuals and notables were arrested, imprisoned, and tortured in the towns as government-supported Arab militias began to attack Masalit villages; a number of Arab chiefs and civilians were also killed in these clashes.

In 2000, a clandestine group consisting mostly of Darfuris published the Black Book, a dissident manuscript detailing the domination of the north and the impoverishment of the other regions. It was widely discussed, despite attempts to censor it, and many of the writers went on to help found the rebel Justice and Equality Movement.

== War in Darfur (2003–2020) ==
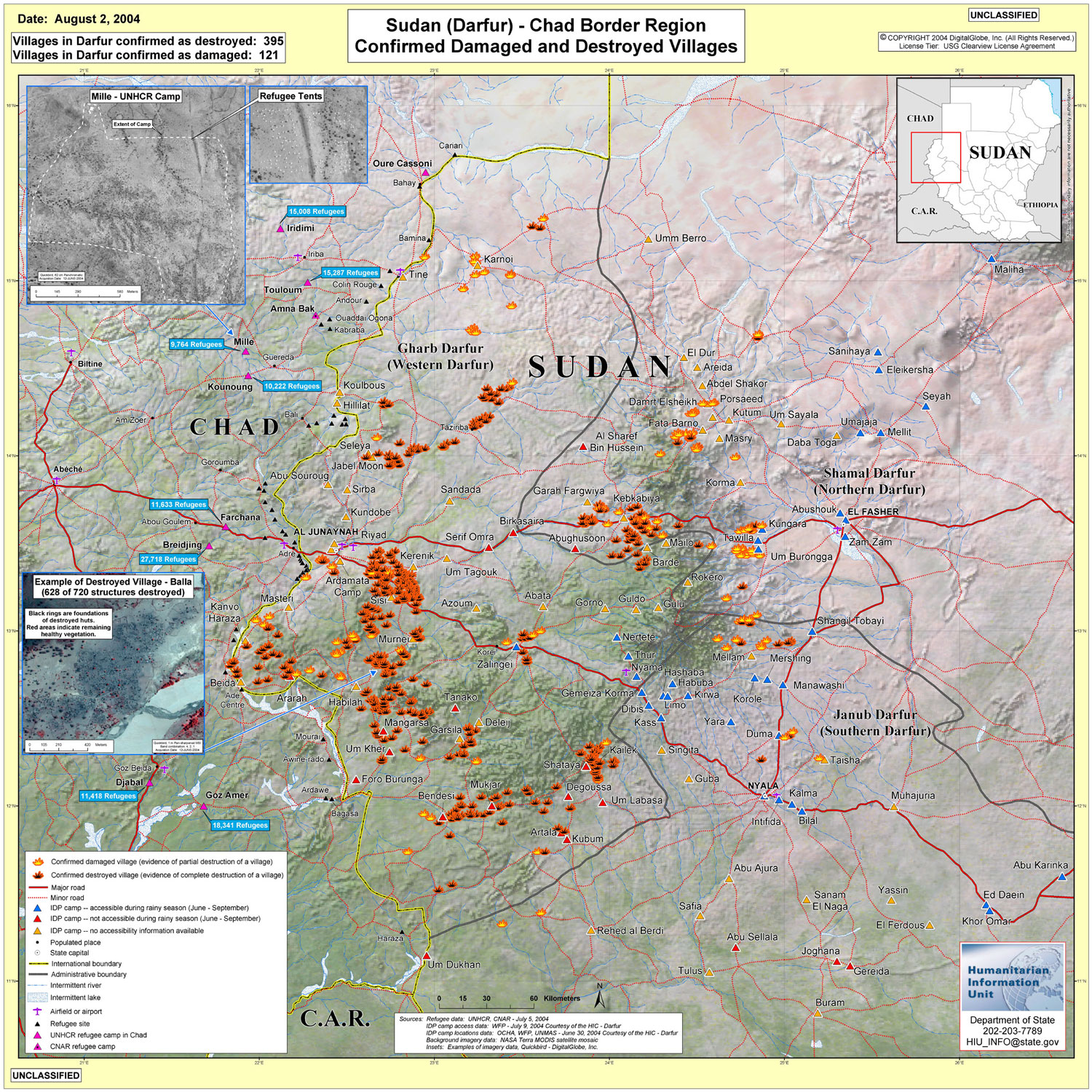
Destroyed Darfuri villages as of August 2004 (Source: DigitalGlobe, Inc. and Department of State via USAID)

The region became the scene of a rebellion in 2003 against the Arab-dominated Sudanese government, with two local rebel groups – the Justice and Equality Movement (JEM) and the Sudanese Liberation Army (SLA) – accusing the government of oppressing non-Arabs in favor of Arabs. The government was also accused of neglecting the Darfur region of Sudan. In response, the government mounted a campaign of aerial bombardment supporting ground attacks by an Arab militia, the Janjaweed. The government-supported Janjaweed were accused of committing major human rights violations, including mass killing, looting, and systematic rape of the non-Arab population of Darfur. They have frequently burned down whole villages, driving the surviving inhabitants to flee to refugee camps, mainly in Darfur and Chad; many of the camps in Darfur are surrounded by Janjaweed forces. By the summer of 2004, 50,000 to 80,000 people had been killed and at least a million had been driven from their homes, causing a major humanitarian crisis in the region.

On September 18, 2004, the UN Security Council passed Resolution 1564, which called for a Commission of Inquiry on Darfur to assess the Sudanese conflict. On January 31, 2005, the UN released a 176-Page report saying that while there were mass murders and rapes, they could not label it as genocide because "genocidal intent appears to be missing". Many activists, however, refer to the crisis in Darfur as a genocide, including the Save Darfur Coalition and the Genocide Intervention Network. These organizations point to statements by former U.S. Secretary of State Colin Powell, referring to the conflict as a genocide. Other activists organizations, such as Amnesty International, while calling for international intervention, avoid the use of the term genocide.

In May 2006 the main rebel group, the Sudanese Liberation Movement, agreed to a draft peace agreement with the Sudanese government. On May 5, both sides signed the agreement, which was drafted in Abuja, Nigeria.

SaveDarfur.org claims that as of May 2007, up to 400,000 Darfurians have died as a result of this conflict.

On 31 August 2020, a peace agreement was signed between the Sudanese authorities and rebel factions to end armed hostilities. However, major clashes occurred in December 2020 and January 2021.
