= Popular Defence Forces (Sudan) =

Paramilitary force in Sudan (1989–2019, 2023-present)

Popular Defence Forces قوات الدفاع الشعبي
- Emblem of the Popular Defence Forces
- Active: 1989–2019; 2023–present
- Country: Sudan
- Allegiance: Government of Sudan (2023–present) National Congress Party (1998–2019) National Islamic Front (1989–1998)
- Type: Paramilitary; Auxiliary force Reserve army
- Role: Reserve army Light infantry
- Size: 95,000
- Engagements: Second Sudanese Civil War; War in Darfur; Sudanese conflict in South Kordofan and Blue Nile; Sudanese civil war (2023–present)

Commanders
- Notable commanders: Ali Ahmed Karti (Commander in the 1990s)

The Popular Defence Forces (PDF, Arabic: قوات الدفاع الشعبي, romanized: Qūwāt al-Difāʻ al-Shaʻbī) are a Sudanese paramilitary force. It was initially formed in the mid-1980s to safeguard and protect Arab tribes in Sudan from rebel attacks during the Second Sudanese Civil War, and as an auxiliary force to support the Sudanese military that was overstretched and demoralized during the civil war. The PDF was officially established in 1989 under the Popular Defense Forces Act of 1989.

== History ==
The origins and formulation of the Popular Defence Forces goes back to 1985 after an attack on the village of al-Gardud in Kordofan state in July 1985 during the Second Sudanese Civil War.

Following the attack, a government delegation to the area led by Minister of Defence Major General Burma Fadlallah Nasir was presented with a choice by native administration leaders: either provide security for the Arab Baggara communities of South Darfur and South Kordofan, or these communities would request such guarantees from the rebel Sudan People's Liberation Army (SPLA) and consequently join the civil war against the government. Unable to redeploy the demoralised and overstretched Sudanese military in southern Sudan, the delegation made a decision—without the authorization of the national Constituent Assembly—to arm the Baggara. Truckloads of ammunition and light weapons, mostly AK-47s and G3 rifles, were distributed directly to members of allied tribes, specifically the Rizeigat and the Misseriya Humr, through native administrative structures and leaders. it was also part of the Sudanese Armed Forces.

In 2004, the Federal Research Division of the Library of Congress estimated that the Popular Defence Forces consisted of 10,000 active members, with 85,000 reserves. It had been deployed alongside regular army units against various rebel groups.

In 2020, rumors were circulating that the Sudanese Armed Forces had absorbed the former PDF. However, the SAF instead stated that the PDF had been dissolved and its headquarters seized. During the current civil war, the PDF was reorganised under Kafi Tayara and fought alongside the SAF in South Kordofan against the SPLM-N and the Rapid Support Forces.

== Organisation ==
The force had close links with the National Islamic Front associated with former president Omar al-Bashir, and was originally formed as a dedicated Islamist militia. In 2015, the PDF largely operated as a reserve force for the Sudanese Armed Forces. Upon its foundation in 1989, several tribal militias throughout Sudan were integrated into the PDF, including the Messiria tribe's murahiliin, the Rizeigat tribe's fursan, and the Fertit Army of Peace. It continued to absorb more militias over its existence, such as the Hawazma ethnic militia that fought alongside the SAF in the Sudanese conflict in South Kordofan and Blue Nile.

== See also ==
- Al-Bara' ibn Malik Brigade, a paramilitary Islamist militia in Sudan
- Muraheleen, Baggara Arabs militia employed by different Sudanese governments since 1983

== Bibliography ==
- Rone, Janera (1996). Behind the Red Line: Political Repression in Sudan. New York City: Human Rights Watch.
