= Sudanese nomadic conflicts =

Non-state conflicts between rival nomadic tribes

- Part of the Sudanese Civil Wars
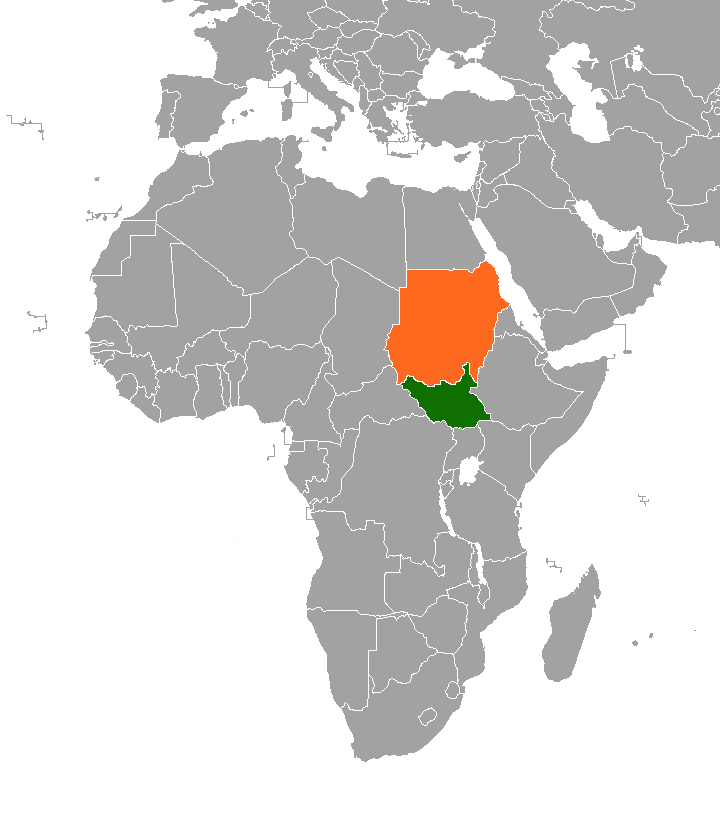
- Sudan (orange) and South Sudan (green) shown within Africa
Date	2008–present
Location	Darfur, West Kordofan and South Sudan
Status	Ongoing

Belligerents
Non-Arab tribes (including Dinka, Nuer, and Murle tribes)	Baggara Arabs (mainly Rizeigat and Messiria tribes)

Casualties and losses
Unknown	Unknown

Sudanese nomadic conflicts are non-state conflicts between rival nomadic tribes in Sudan and South Sudan. These conflicts are common and typically arise over scarce resources such as grazing land, cattle, and drinking water. Tribes involved in these clashes include the Messiria, Maalia, Rizeigat and Bani Hussein Arab tribes inhabiting Darfur and West Kordofan, as well as the Dinka, Nuer and Murle African ethnic groups inhabiting South Sudan. The conflicts have been intensified by broader wars in the region, particularly the Second Sudanese Civil War, the War in Darfur and the Sudanese conflict in South Kordofan and Blue Nile.

Over the years, clashes between rival ethnic militias have caused significant casualties and displaced hundreds of thousands of people. Notable violent incidents include:

- 1993: between Jikany Nuer and Lou Nuer in Upper Nile;
- 2009–2012: clashes between Lou Nuer and Murle in Jonglei;
- 2013–2014: conflict involving the Maalia, Rizeigat, Messiria, Salamat and Bani Hussein in Darfur and West Kordofan.

== Timeline ==
=== 2008 ===
Clashes between the Messiria and the Rizeigat tribes in 2008 resulted in about 70 deaths.

=== 2009 ===
==== May ====
In early 2009, several incidents of tribal fighting in southern Sudan killed about 900 people, most of them women and children. On 26 May 2008, a large-scale clash took place near the village of Meiram, when about 2,000 Rizeigat men mounted on horses and supported by 35 vehicles attacked a group of Messiria. Sudanese police attempted to intervene by establishing a buffer zone, but were themselves attacked by an estimated 3,000 Rizeigat horsemen. Casualties included 75 police officers, 75 members of the Rizeigat tribe, and between 89 and 109 from the Messiria.

The interior minister, Ibrahim Mahmoud Hamad, pledged to bring those responsible to justice and announced steps to disarm civilians. The United Nations Mission in Sudan (UNMIS), which had deployed 120 peacekeepers to Jonglei state earlier in May to prevent tribal violence, also began an investigation. Sudanese authorities instructed both tribes to maintain a distance of at least 5 km from each other to avoid further clashes. Although fighting in the area subsided, tensions remained, raising concerns about security ahead of the national elections scheduled for February national general election.

==== June ====
The 2009 Sobat River ambush was a battle between Jikany Nuer tribesmen and the Sudanese People's Liberation Army (SPLA) which was escorting a United Nations (UN) aid convoy on 12 June 2009.

==== August ====
Early morning on 2 August 2009, more than 180 members of the Lou Nuer community were killed, over 30 injured, and many reported missing in a "well-coordinated and planned" attack allegedly carried out by Murle fighters while the victims were fishing for food. Eleven SPLA soldiers assigned to protect civilians were also killed. The victims had been fishing due to severe food shortages following the June attacks on aid barges delivering supplies to the area. During the assault, some people were pursued toward a river and several bodies became entangled in fishing nets. Most of the dead were women and children, with reports that entire families had been "wiped out." The death toll was expected to rise.

=== 2010 ===
==== January ====
On 2 January 2010, at least 139 people were killed in tribal clashes following a cattle raid in Southern Sudan.

On 11 January 2010, Nuer fighters attacked a Dinka village, killing 45 civilians and injuring 102 in what was described as a particularly brutal assault.

==== April ====
At least 55 people were killed in an attack in South Darfur between the Sudan People's Liberation Army in South Sudan and another unidentified, disputed party, thought to be either the Rizeigat or Sudan People's Armed Forces.

==== November ====
The United Nations received reports that members of the Messiria people clashed with the Sudanese Armed Forces in mountainous territory west of Kas, South Darfur, on 9–10 November 2010. The Sudanese army denied involvement in the fighting. However, a spokesman for the Arab United Revolutionary Force Front claimed that helicopters and jets had attacked their positions, killing seven civilians and two fighters.

==== December ====
In December, armed Messiria tribesmen stopped about 150 cars in South Kordofan and took nearly 1,000 passengers hostage. The hostages were traveling from Khartoum to Southern Sudan to participate in the 9 January 2011 independence referendum. The Messiria stated that they would continue to hold the captives until Unity State in South Sudan paid blood money promised after three Messiria shepherds were killed by southern tribes earlier in the year.

=== 2011 ===
==== January ====
At least 76 people were killed in the Abyei region during clashes between the Messiria and Ngok Dinka that began on 7 January 2011. Casualties included 50 Messiria and 26 Ngok Dinka and local police. The violence occurred during the South Sudanese independence referendum. Both the Sudanese and Southern Sudanese governments accused each other of involvement in the fighting, but observer and former U.S. president Jimmy Carter stated that he believed "the national forces in the north and the south have been very careful not to become involved in the conflict."

==== February ====
At least 10 people were killed and others injured in a confrontation between the Messiria and local police in Todach, Abyei, on 27 February 2011. The attack came days after a meeting between Messiria and Ngok Dinka leaders to discuss compensation for the 12 Ngok Dinka killed in the January clashes, which ended without resolution. Leaders of the Abyei administration alleged that the tribesmen were supported by pro-Sudan militias.

The confrontation consisted of two separate attacks on the police post at Todach, at 4:00 a.m. and 11:30 a.m. local time. Local government officials claimed that the Sudanese government had ordered the attacks to increase pressure ahead of talks on Abyei's future status within Sudan or South Sudan. The Messiria alleged that armed Ngok Dinka tribesmen were responsible and had disguised themselves as police to block cattle movement. They further claimed that the Ngok Dinka were supported by the Sudan People's Liberation Army (SPLA). The SPLA denied the allegations, stating that no SPLA soldiers were stationed in the Abyei region.

==== May ====
At the start of May 2011, at least 68 people were killed when members of the Nuer tribe carried out several raids on water points used by the Murle tribe and stole an estimated 100,000 cattle.

==== June ====
In June 2011, the Messiria tribe reportedly attacked a train carrying members of South Sudan's army returning home shortly before the country's independence. The attack took place at Meiram, about 50 km south of Muglad, and was confirmed by UN officials. The Messiria denied involvement and blamed the attack on Darfur rebels.

==== September ====
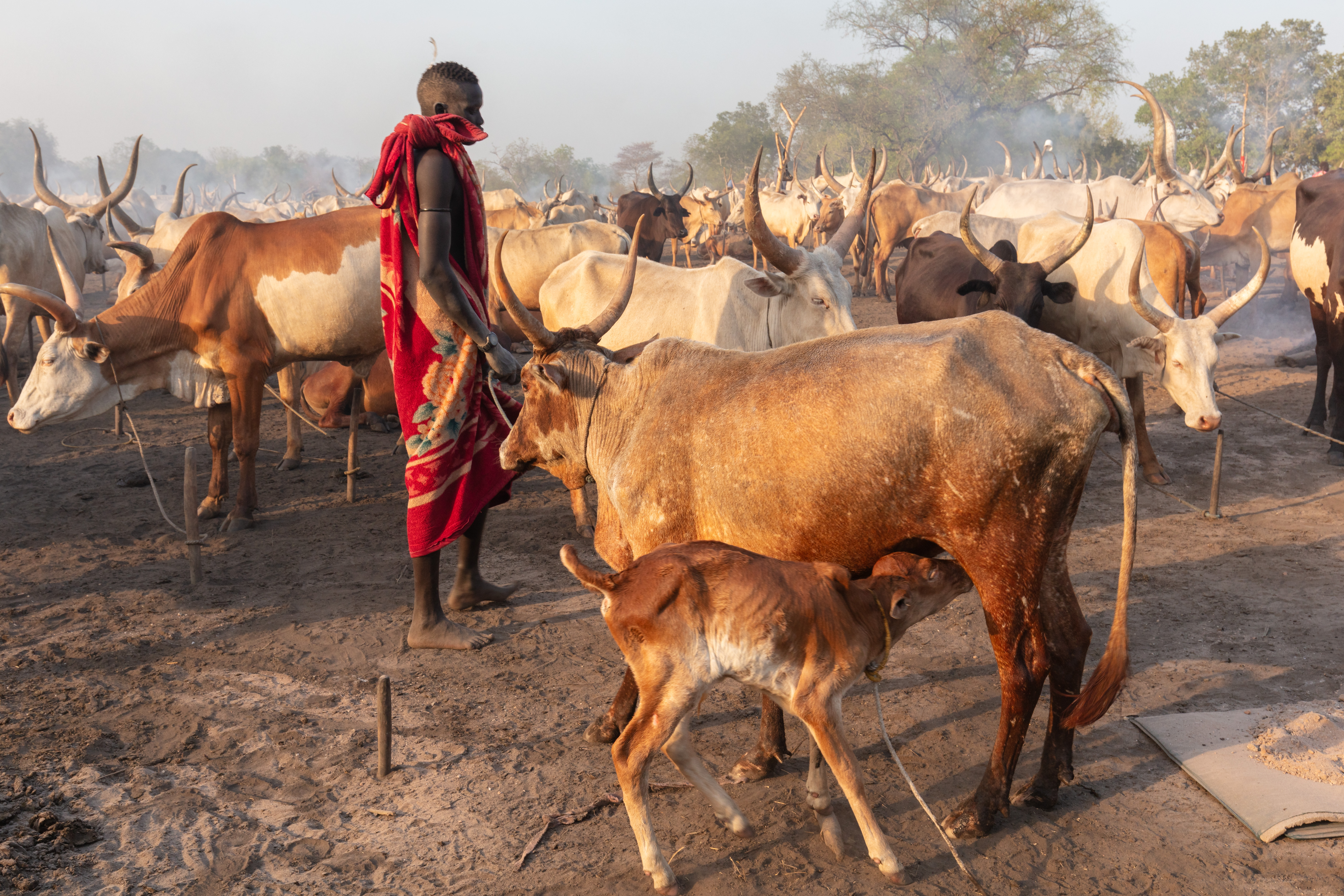
Cattle-herders in South Sudan

Around 30 people were killed, 13 injured, and 49 reported missing after a cattle raid in Mayiandit County, Unity State. Approximately 200 men armed with AK-47s, rocket-propelled grenades, and machine guns stole about 100,000 cattle from the local community. Police forces managed to recover around 600 of the cattle but were unable to pursue the attackers due to being outnumbered. Local residents expressed anger, noting that the government's disarmament program intended to reduce attacks had left them vulnerable. The attackers were allegedly dressed in the uniform of the Sudan People's Liberation Army (SPLA).

==== October ====
In late October 2011, clashes occurred between the Awlad Surur and Awlad Heiban factions of the Messiria tribe. The fighting occurred on disputed grazing lands in the Fardus area of South Kordofan, which lies on the traditional migratory route of the tribe. Approximately 300 people were killed and at least 37 wounded with 140 of the dead from the Awlad Heiban and 60 from the Awlad Surur. A spokesman from the Sudan People's Liberation Movement condemned the violence blaming the National Congress Party for arranging the violence and the police for failing to intervene.

==== November ====
November 2011 saw the first elements of the Dinka Ngok tribe return to Abyei after violence broke out in the area in May. Guarded by Ethiopian peacekeeping forces the tribal leaders said that they had been among 150,000 people forced from the area by Sudanese army troops. The Dinka Nok stated their wish for a permanent Ethiopian presence in the area to ensure the safety of their people and for an end to the influx of Messiria tribesmen into the area. The UN World Food Programme provided assistance to 90,000 people in the area between May and August 2011.

==== December ====
In the second week of December 2011, at least 37 people were killed in a series of raids carried out by the Murle against the Nuer. The following week, two cattle herders were killed, one wounded, and livestock stolen. The United Nations peacekeeping force warned that escalating violence was threatening the stability of South Sudan and urged the resumption of peace talks.

On 23 December, youths from the Lou Nuer tribe launched a retaliatory attack against the Murle in Linkuangol, Pibor County. Official reports place the toll at 24 killed and at least five wounded, though a member of vice-president Riek Machar's staff placed the number at 40 killed and reporting seeing bodies lying in the streets of the town. There were also reports of buildings set on fire. Machar visited Linkuangol to urge the 9,000 Lou Nuer in the area to return home and cease their attacks. The Lou Nuer stated that they were acting because the government had failed to stop the violence and that they intended to capture the Murle's county headquarters at Pibor and disarm the tribe. Later hospital figures put the number of injured Murle tribesmen at 88 with Juba hospital's emergency wards at full capacity as a result. More than 20,000 people fled Linkuangol due to the violence.

The Lou Nuer claimed the action was in retaliation for a Murle attack in August which left 700 Nuer dead in Uror county. The August action is thought to have caused the deaths of 861 people with 8,000 houses burnt and 38,000 cattle stolen. The Lou Nuer claim the intention of their December attacks is to find 180 Lou Nuer children they claim were abducted by the Murle in August.

Location of Pibor in South Sudan

The United Nations Mission in South Sudan (UNMISS) reacted by deploying a battalion of peacekeepers to Pibor where 6,000 armed youths were said to be headed to attack the Murle there. UN Secretary-General Ban Ki-moon voiced deep concern over the hostilities and urged for an end to the violence. The South Sudanese government also deployed a battalion of army personnel to Pibor where they have taken up positions on the outskirts of town to dissuade any attack. The UN said it was hindered by poor infrastructure and that the only means of entering Pibor at present was by air. It had taken a day and a half to transfer just two armoured personnel carriers to the town and a convoy of reinforcements sent by truck was forced to turn back due to poor road conditions. The UN is hindered by having no military aircraft and being forced to rely on civilian helicopters.

Tens of thousands of Murle people have fled Pibor for fear of more violence. More than 1,000 people have been killed in inter-ethnic clashes in the area in the past few months, with most victims being women and children. The violence is seen as one of the biggest challenges to stability in South Sudan. By Friday 30 December, an advance group of 500 Lou Nuer had taken up positions on the outskirts of Pibor.

At 3 p.m. on 31 December 2011, between 3,000 and 6,000 Lou Nuer tribesmen attacked a part of Pibor not protected by UN peacekeepers. Houses were reported to have been set on fire and much of the town, including the airport and main hospital, were occupied. Scores of people have been reported dead and 20,000 displaced. The Lou Nuer were said to be pursuing members of the Murle who had fled southwards. South Sudan has promised to send more army personnel and 2,000 police to the town to reinforce the 800 troops already there. The healthcare charity Médecins Sans Frontières (MSF) says that it has lost contact with 130 of its staff who were forced to flee into the bush due to the attack. MSF said that a hospital and two outreach clinics had been overrun with some reports stating that the hospital had been set on fire. Looting was said to have taken place at the MSF facilities.

=== 2012 ===
==== January ====
By 2 January 2012, the majority of the Lou Nuer force were said to have left Pibor and started to move to the South-East with a UN spokesman saying they were "almost certainly looking for cattle". The UN said that it had successfully held the main part of Pibor alongside South Sudanese army troops but that an MSF clinic had been overrun. The South Sudanese army said that it had regained full control of Pibor by 3 January.

On 3 January 2012, South Sudan's Peace and Reconciliation Commission said that at least 150 people had been killed in the attack on Pibor. Representatives of the Murle people alleged that some of the people who fled Pibor had been hunted down and killed near River Kengen, south-east of the town. They said that women and children had been killed there and some drowned in the river as they tried to flee. Also, on 3 January 2012, the UN and South Sudanese army received criticism for failing to protect civilians in Pibor, restricting their forces to protecting government buildings.

On 5 January 2012, the South Sudan Council of Ministers, led by President Salva Kiir, declared the state of Jonglei a humanitarian disaster zone.

A series of revenge attacks were carried out by Murle tribesmen which resulted in 24 people being killed in Akobo County on 8 January 2012; eight people killed at Padoi on 10 January 2012 and 57 killed, 53 wounded and cattle stolen in attacks on three Lou Nuer villages in northern Jonglei, on 11 January 2012. By 22 January 2012, it was estimated that around 3,000 people had lost their lives in fighting since December 2011.

==== March ====
On 1 March 2012, the South Sudanese government announced that it had regained full control of Pibor from tribal forces and ordered remaining Lou Nuer tribesmen to return to their homes. On 9 March 2012, it was alleged that Murle tribesmen had taken control of a number of Lou Nuer camps and villages in the Akobo County of Jonglei and wounded hundreds of people, in spite of a campaign by 12,000 SPLA troops to disarm civilians in the area. The fighting caused at least 200 deaths and occurred in an area inaccessible by road to South Sudan's security forces, the Murle accessing it through neighbouring Ethiopia.

==== November/December ====
In Tawila (North Kordofan) and surrounding villages conflicts repeatedly arose when armed herders drove livestock onto cultivated land, damaging crops and sometimes attacking farmers who attempted to prevent them.

=== 2013 ===
==== January ====
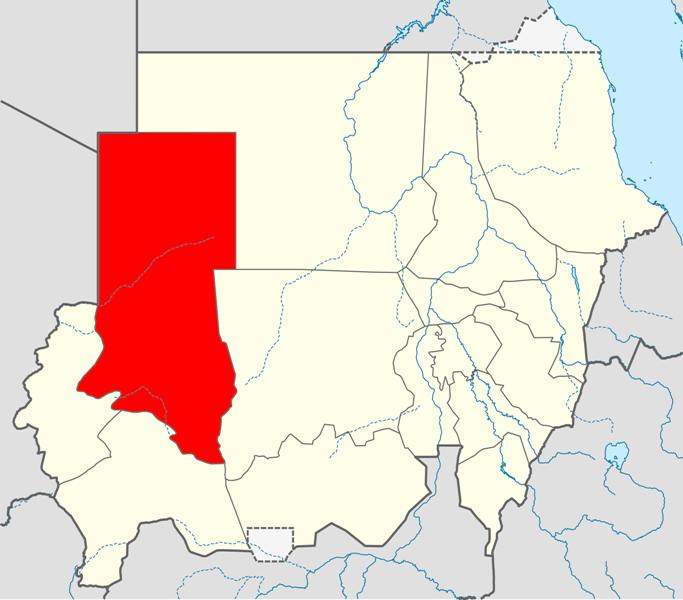
Location of North Darfur in Sudan

Fighting between tribes in Darfur erupted in January 2013 following the collapse of law and order caused by the rebelling of African rebels against the Arab-led government. Control of the Jebel Amer gold mine in El Sireaf, North Darfur was a key aim of rival Bani Hussein and Rizeigat tribes. Some of the tribesmen had formerly fought for the government and had been armed by them; some of the tribesmen remain on the government payroll. The United Nations estimated more than 100 deaths and 100,000 people displaced. A ceasefire agreement was reached by the end of the month.

Figures released by a member of the ruling National Congress Party in late February placed casualties in the Jebel Amer fighting to be 510 killed and 865 wounded. There were known to have been 68 villages destroyed and 120 partially damaged along with 20,000 families displaced and confirmed cases of rape.

==== February ====
On 8 February 2013, an attack by Murle tribesmen on a convoy of families from the rival Lou Nuer tribe in Jonglei State left more than 103 people dead, primarily women and children. Many additional women and children were reported missing. Fourteen of the dead were South Sudanese soldiers escorting the convoy. The incident was linked to Murle rebel leader David Yau Yau. The International Committee of the Red Cross dispatched a medical team to treat the wounded. This attack was the deadliest tribal violence in Jonglei since the 2011 cattle clashes, which killed over 900 people.

On 21 February 2013, fresh violence erupted at Jebel Amer in North Darfur when Rizeigat tribesmen attacked members of the Bani Hussein, leaving 21 dead and 33 wounded in an eight-hour engagement. Further fighting on 23 February killed at least 60 people and wounded at least 62 after camel-mounted tribesmen raided the El Sireaf area targeting Bani Hussein tribesmen. The local governor reported that the attackers wore military uniforms and belonged to the Rizeigat tribe. Hospital facilities were overwhelmed, with some wounded forced to wait outside for treatment.

The fighting was described as the worst since a previously brokered ceasefire. The Sudanese government subsequently claimed to have restored order and condemned the actions of "criminals" on both sides. A UN spokesman expressed deep concern over the violence, noting its impact on humanitarian operations. El Sireaf was reportedly cut off from aid due to the fighting, and the violence led to one of the largest recent displacements of civilians in Darfur.

==== March ====
On 1 March 2013, seven people died and four were injured in a fight between members of the Al-Gimir and Bani Halba tribes in South Darfur, Sudan. Six from the Al-Gimir were killed and two injured after armed elements of the Bani Halba attacked two villages in Katela, one member of the Bani Halba died and two were injured. State government forces later arrived at Katela to contain the violence.

Later in March 2013, reconciliation meetings organised by state officials took place between rival tribes to bring to an end the conflict over the Jebel Amer gold mine. As part of the peace process the state was able to reopen the roads in the area for the first time since 21 February 2013 to assist with the supply of emergency aid. The UN agency ANAMID was establishing a temporary base in the area to help provide aid to the local populace.

==== April ====
Clashes between the Messiria and Salamat tribes occurred from 3 April 2013 in central Darfur, near the border with Chad. They are believed to have started after a member of the Messiria tried to rob a Salamat man before opening fire. Attempts at mediation failed and open fighting occurred from 4 April 2013 with the Messiria burning a local government office in Abugaratil, south of Umm Dukhun, before looting the village. Fighting resumed on 8 April 2013 at Gerlia, Umm Sauri and Abugaratil with civilians fleeing the area, some to Chad. At least 80 people were killed in fighting on 8 April 2013, with a total of 163 killed in this outbreak. As of 9 April 2013, there has been no apparent government response. The UN and African Union mission to Darfur confirmed that it had received reports of the clashes and that there had been a "number of victims". The violence caused at least 50,000 people to flee to Chad in the week to 12 April 2013.

The weekend of 13/14 April 2013 saw the theft of 750 cattle in Eastern Equatoria, South Sudan. A government force of wildlife officers, police and army personnel sought to apprehend the rustlers but were engaged in a firefight by the criminals. Nine of the security forces were killed along with five of the rustlers and two civilians. Thirteen soldiers were injured. The cattle thieves then fled to the mountains. On 15 April 2013, a large government force was deployed to hunt down the thieves but was allegedly involved in atrocities, killing civilians, burning houses and businesses, opening fire on civilians and attacking a hospital. A member of the South Sudanese parliament stated that a doctor, two medical staff and a patient were shot at the hospital before it was burnt down. BBC News claimed that five people were killed at the hospital and described it as a revenge attack. The attack on the hospital was confirmed by local community leaders but denied by the state governor, Louis Obong. An SPLA spokesman said that the army's officers would investigate the allegations.

==== May ====
On 4 May 2013, a clash between tribes in Abyei district left at least 20 people dead including up to two UN peacekeepers, an Ngok Dinka tribal chief and 17 members of the Messiria tribe. The incident was apparently sparked by the failure of the Ngok Dinka tribe to inform the Messiria that they would be in the area.

At the end of May 2013, clashes between the Al-Gimir and Bani Halba tribes in South Darfur left 64 people dead and dozens wounded from both sides. The Bani Halba instigated an attack on Intakaina utilising 30 armed vehicles as well as a number of horses. The attack was believed to have been caused by a struggle over control of acacia trees used for the production of gum arabic, a stabiliser used in soft drinks. The Al-Gimir claimed to have held the disputed land for the last 300 years and that the Bani Halba had been assisted by uniformed men equipped with government-issued weapons. An Al-Gimir leader claimed that 94 people had died in the violence and that 1,200 homes had been burnt. The United Nations stated that 6,500 people have fled the area of because of the recent violence.

=== 2014 ===
==== November ====
At least 133 people were killed and 100 wounded, in the aftermath of clashes between Awlad Omran and Al-Ziyoud groups of the Messiria tribe. The clashes occurred in the Kwak area of West Kordofan state, Sudan.

=== 2016 ===
==== April ====
According to the government of Ethiopia, the death toll from a cross-border raid carried out by attackers from South Sudan in the Gambela Region on 15 April 2016 rose to 208 from a figure of 140 a day earlier, with 108 children being kidnapped and over 2,000 livestock being stolen in the process. Ethiopian forces killed 60 of the attackers and said they would cross the border into South Sudan to pursue the assailants if necessary. Ethiopian officials blamed Murle tribesmen inhabiting the Jonglei region close to the Ethiopian border for a series of attacks on Ethiopian villages to steal cattle and abduct children. The 15 April 2016 raid targeted the Nuer tribe, who live on both sides of the border.

=== 2017 ===
==== March ====
An Ethiopian official says 28 people were killed and 43 children kidnapped by Murle tribe armed members between 10 and 12 March 2017 near the border between Gambela Region of Ethiopia and South Sudan. The official also said that over 1,000 Murle tribespeople carried out the attack.

=== 2019 ===
In July 2019, Radio Dabanga reported that it had documented numerous attacks on displaced farmers across Darfur over the preceding years, many of them in Tawila locality.

=== 2022 ===
==== October ====
Violent tribal fighting in southern Sudan resulted in 220 deaths between 19 and 24 October.

== See also ==
- Second Sudanese Civil War
- Ethnic violence in South Sudan
- Herder–farmer conflicts in Nigeria
- Oromo–Somali clashes
