= Awlad Himayd =

Awlad Himayd is a group of people who are part of the greater Baggara Arabs tribes of Kordofan and Darfur that includes the Habbaniya and Ta'isha.

== Description ==
They speak Sudanese Arabic. Awlad Himayd live in eastern parts of South Kordofan. They were nomadic people who shared routes (sig. Morhal, pl. Marahiil) with the Halafa, a branch of the Hawazma, and the Kenana and Habbaniya tribes. Their travels take them as far as the Shilluk and Nuer of the White Nile. Their inner southern nomadic area is part of the wilderness of South Kordofan, a dense high savanna forest land.

The majority are pastoralists, and the rest are farmers; they grow all types of South Kordofan crops: sesame, millets, okra, and ground nuts. They grow Gum Arabic and collect gums and honey from the woods.

They are widely viewed among Baggara peoples as being courageous; great hunters of elephants and big game like giraffe, antelope, tiang, and Ostrich; they are also known as great fighters of wild beasts such lions, tigers, wolves, and others at earlier times. Baggara people are good hunters and gatherers of wild fruits, wild okra, and honey from undomesticated bees. Gray-bees (Nahala el ghibasha in Arabic), the fiercest type of bee in South Kordofan, are nicknamed "Awlad Himayd" because of their courage.

== Origins and divisions ==
The Awlad Himayd belong to the wider group of Baggara Arabs of Kordofan and Darfur. They are Sunni Muslims. MacMichael mentioned that their Arab ancestors may have settled around Tekali in the eastern part of South Kordofan at a time of the great Guhayna movement, and they have been reinforced by others of their kin who have returned from the western countries (probably from present-day Chad).

== See also ==
- Baggara
