= Beni Halba tribe =

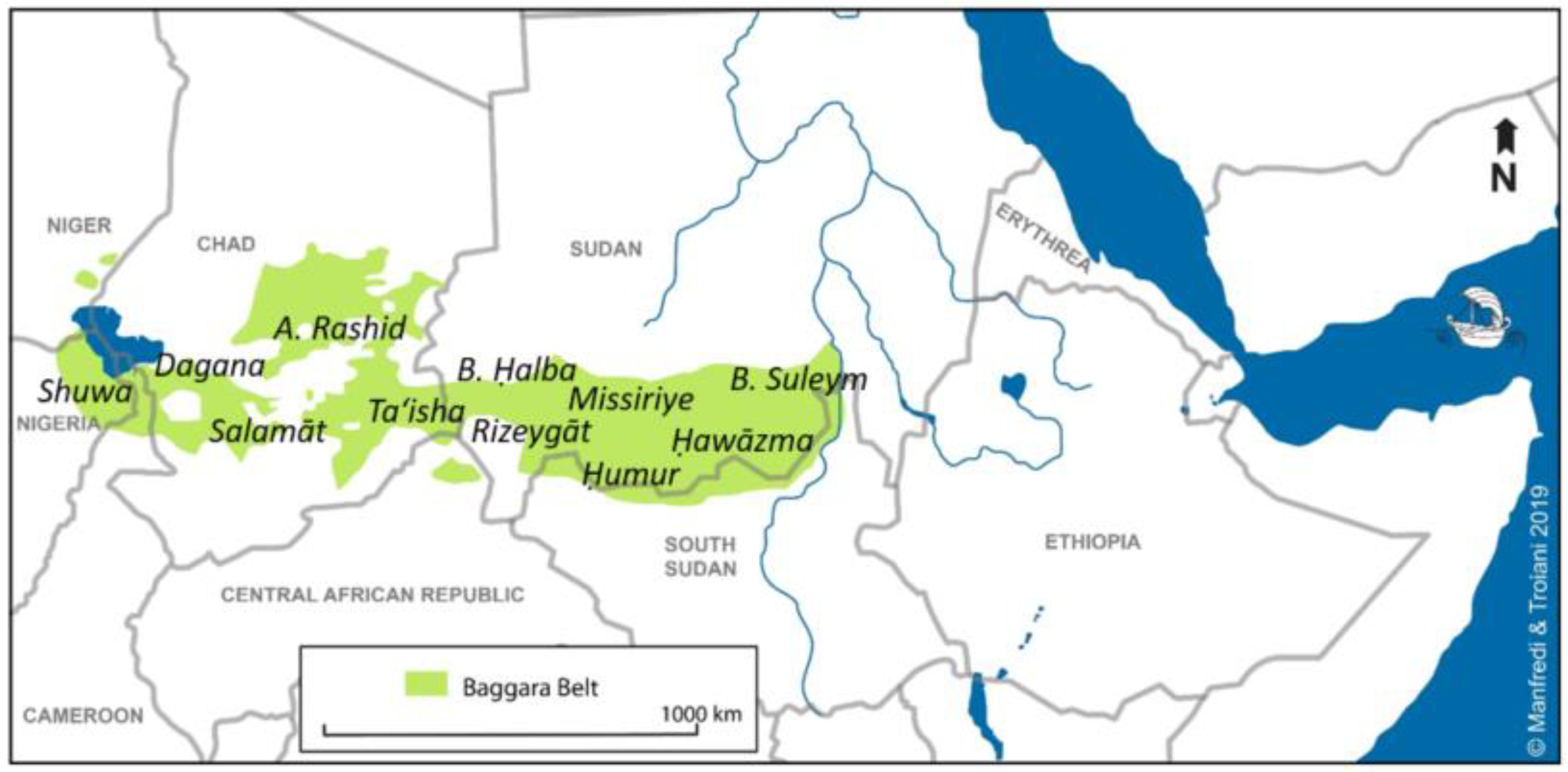
Baggara belt.

The Beni Halba (Arabic: بني هلبا) is an Arab group located in the western Sudanese region of Darfur. The Beni Halba is one of the major Darfuri Baggara groups, along with the Habbaniya, Rizeigat and Ta’isha, and was granted a large hakura (land grant) in southern Darfur by the sultans of independent Dar Fur. During the 1980s, recurring drought in Chad prompted several clans of Beni Halba to migrate eastwards and join their kinspeople between Geneina and Kebkabiya and Kutum. In the late 1980s, the ideology then sweeping through the region combining Arab supremacy and Islamic extremism was taken up by many Beni Halba. Under Nazir al-Hadi Issa Debaker, the Beni Halba were actively involved in attacks upon the Fur people starting in 1987 through 1989. In this period a new militia called the Janjaweed, partially drawing upon the Beni Halba, was first formed. In 1991 the Sudan People's Liberation Army, then fighting the Second Sudanese Civil War in the south of the country, sent a force under Daud Bolad to expand the conflict into Darfur. However, Bolad's force was annihilated by a combination of the army and Beni Halba fursan ("horsemen"), who then carried out reprisal attacks against Fur civilians. As a result, the Beni Halba district town of Idd al Ghanam ("Well of Goats") was renamed Idd al Fursan ("Well of Horseman").

The tribe has a major existence in both Sudan and Tchad. Within the tribe, Bani Helba includes over 10 major clans. The Main Clans are Dar Nimir, Wolad Gumaan, Zanateet, Wolad Ghanim, Ghieth, Wolad Ali, Hathalil, Bani Monzoor, Isharia, Mosawiyaih, Bani Labid, Wolad Furkha, Hazazra, Gimailat, Mistinan and Alwanaih

As the Darfur conflict erupted in the beginning of the 2000s, the Sudanese government attempted to convince al-Hadi Issa Debaker to merge his Beni Halba with the Janjaweed. Debaker refused, stating that he would defend himself if attacked on Beni Halba land. Regardless, members of the Beni Halba and other Baggara groups continue to be recruited into the Janjaweed.

== See also ==
- Baggara
