= 2010 South Darfur clash =

Clash during the Sudanese nomadic conflicts

2010 South Darfur attack
- Part of Sudanese nomadic conflicts
Date	23 April 2010
Location	Bulbula, South Darfur, Sudan 9.9918433°N 26.1817932°E

Belligerents
SPLA	Unknown, claimed to be Rezeigat tribe or Sudan People's Armed Forces

Strength
A company of 120 men	Four landcruisers with mounted machine guns

Casualties and losses
Unknown	At least 58 killed and 85 wounded according to Rezeigat tribal source
- Bulbula within Sudan.

On 23 April 2010 a military clash occurred in South Darfur involving a Sudan People's Liberation Army (SPLA) company and another party. The clash happened in Balballa near to the border with the Bahr al-Ghazal province. The identity of the other combatant is disputed with the SPLA claiming it to be the North Sudanese Sudan People's Armed Forces (SPAF) whilst the SPAF and tribal sources say that it was Rezeigat nomadic Arab tribesmen that were involved. A Rezeigat tribal leader has said that 58 tribesmen were killed in the clash and 85 were wounded. The governor of Bahr al-Ghazal has stated that both sides suffered casualties but no figures for SPLA losses are known.

The attack came just before results of the April general election were due to be announced. North Sudanese President Omar al-Bashir was expected to win the election, with the Sudan People's Liberation Movement retaining control over the semi-autonomous south of the country.

== Responsibility ==
It is not known who instigated the attack. The SPLA claims that the attackers were uniformed members of the northern Sudan People's Armed Forces (SPAF) and used four landcruisers with mounted machine guns. The SPAF denies any involvement in this attack but stated that the SPLA had clashed with the Rezeigat nomadic Arab tribe, calling it a "clear violation" of the 2005 peace deal. A tribal spokesman confirmed to the Agence France Presse news agency that the Rezeigat had been involved in the clash with the SPLA whilst searching for new pastures for their cattle. The SPLA denied this stating that the Rezeigat were not equipped with landcruisers. The governor of nearby Bahr al-Ghazal province only confirmed a clash between the SPLA and "armed men" that caused casualties on both sides. The governor stated that he would meet with the Darfuri authorities to discuss the matter.

== Attack ==
The attack occurred in Balballa, South Darfur and according to a tribal leader resulted in the deaths of at least 58 tribesmen and the wounding of 85 more. Reinforcements from both sides are reported to be heading to the area with SPLA forces said to be headed from Raja, Aweil and Wau. The Rezeigat were previously involved in a conflict with other nomadic tribes in 2009 that claimed the lives of 900 people. The SPLA is affiliated with the Sudan People's Liberation Movement which rules the semi-autonomous South Sudan region and was permitted to retain an army after a peace deal ended the Second Sudanese Civil War in 2005.

The SPLA stated that another attack had been launched on its forces in the area on 25 April. This attack occurred in the Raja area and forced the SPLA force to retreat. Of the approximately 100 men in the area 47 had reported back with the remainder presumed to be still out in the field.
