= Sheikh. Awdah bin Hamad ALMarwani ALJehani =

Awdah bin Hamad Almarwani (Awdah bin Hamad Arabic: عوده بن حمد c. 1916 – 1994) was the leader (shaikh) of a section of the Juhaynah or Aljehani tribe of Bedouin Arabs Bin Hamad was a significant tribal figure in the Hijaz and well respected by Ibn Saud

== Banu Marwan ==
Banu Marwan a clan of Juhaynah (Arabic: المراويين) "the people of manners". They are the leaders of Juhaynah tribe. Almarween are Sunni Tribe in the Arabian Peninsula. There is no official tribe population count but it is estimated to be approximately one million in Saudi Arabia. The tribe Chief, Sheikh. Awdah bin Hamad ALMarwani ALJehani. The tribal lands extend from the Red Sea coast in Yanbu (Western Part of Saudi Arabia) to the heart of Najd in the central region of Saudi Arabia, and from North lands extend from Madinah (a holy city for Muslims) to Al Qunfudhah in the south.
