= Habbaniya =

Habbaniya can refer to:

- Habbaniyah, a city in Al Anbar Governorate, Iraq
  - Lake Habbaniyah, a lake in Iraq
  - RAF Habbaniya, a former Royal Air Force airbase in Iraq (1936–1959)
  - Habbaniyat Al-Sumood SC, Iraqi football club
- Habbaniya tribe, a Sudanese ethnic group

== See also ==
- Habban (disambiguation)
