= Ibrahim Mahmoud Hamad =

Sudanese politician (born 1956)

Minister of Interior
- In office 2008–2018

Governor of Kassala State
- In office 2006–2008

Personal details
- Born: January 1956 (age 70)
- Party: National Congress Party

Ibrahim Mahmoud Hamad (born January 1956) is a Sudanese politician of the National Congress Party, who governed Kassala State from 2006 until 2008, whereupon he adopted the position of Minister of the Interior in the Ministry of Interior Affairs. He is noted for his liaison with United Nations peacekeeping forces in Sudan, and the 2009 Sudanese nomadic conflicts. Following the April 2019 Sudanese coup, Hamad lost his position as Minister of Interior. The former Interior Minister was arrested on April 14, 2019, for his role in the crackdown of people protested the rule of former President Omar al-Bashir.
