= Habban =

Habban may be:

- Habban District, a district of the Shabwah Governorate in Yemen
  - Wahidi Haban, a former sultanate in the region
- Habbān, a type of bagpipe from countries of the Persian Gulf

== See also ==
- Habbaniya (disambiguation)
