= Daud Bolad =

Sudanese politician (1952–1992)

Daud Yahya Bolad
- Born: 1952
- Died: 1992 (aged 39–40)

Daud Yahya Bolad (January 1952 – January 1992) was a Sudanese politician and rebel leader. Bolad was ethnically Fur and was born in Darfur. In the early 1970s, Bolad was nominated by the Islamist oriented National Islamic Front to be the president of the Khartoum University Students Union (KUSU). He became the first KUSU president who was not from the Arab tribes along the Nile who dominate national politics. The position was seen as placing Bolad on the fast track to national political leadership as part of the 'western strategy' of Hassan al-Turabi to gain the votes of Darfur and Kordofan. Bolad's deputy and bodyguard at this time was Tayeb Ibrahim, nicknamed 'al Sikha' after the rebar with which he attacked student demonstrators. However, Bolad was arrested in 1971 by the police of then-President Gaafar Nimeiry for his high-profile militant activity and severely tortured.

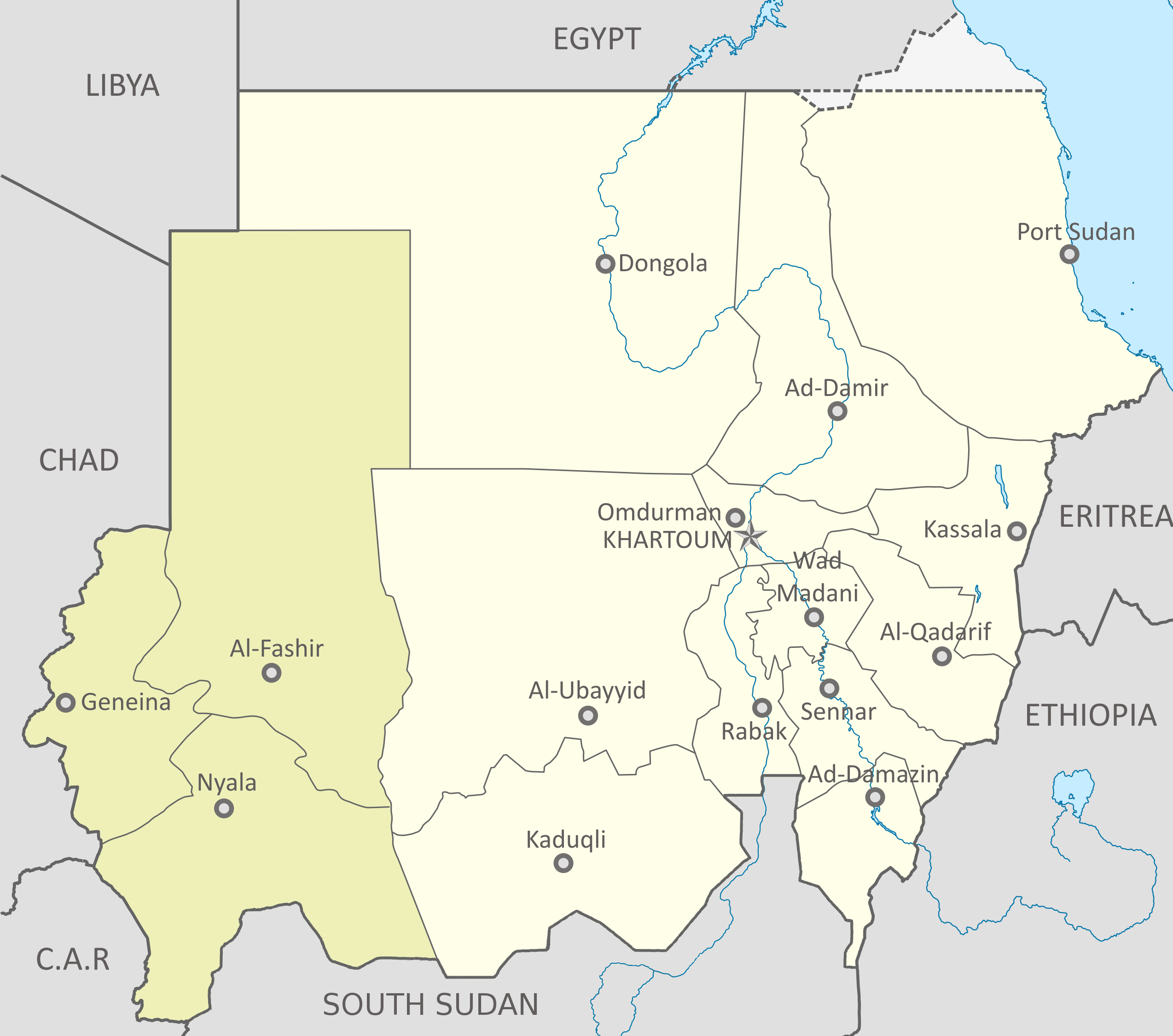
Darfur Map

== Racial discrimination ==
After graduation Tayeb 'Sikha' rose up through the political establishment, while Bolad did not. The racial discrimination of the national political elite kept him from progressing, a charge he would make openly against the Muslim Brotherhood. Bolad would later write, "even when I go to the mosque to pray, even there, in the presence of God, for them I am still a slave [abid] and they will assign me a place related to my race." Bolad returned to Darfur and became a small businessman.

== Separation from Islamic Movement ==
He had further second thoughts about the Islamist movement in 1988 after al-Turabi silenced all criticism of the Libyan-backed violence in Darfur. He was briefly associated with the Sudan Socialist Union, the party of Nimeiry, and continued to drift to the political left. He was described as "obsessive and driven, meticulously and energetically building up his political network".

== Building the resisting force ==
Frustrated and disillusioned, Bolad went to Chad in 1989 seeking the support of President Hissène Habré in starting a rebel movement in Darfur, but was rejected. He then went to Ethiopia to meet John Garang, leader of the Sudan People's Liberation Army (SPLA), which had been prosecuting the Second Sudanese Civil War in the south since 1983. Other prominent leftist Darfuri politicians, such as Ahmed Diraige, felt that the SPLA would use Darfur for its own purposes and refused to involve themselves. Bolad joined the SPLA in 1990 and received military training in South Kordofan. He was made the political commissar of a SPLA military expedition into Darfur that began in November 1991 and proved disastrous.

== SPLA military expedition ==
The given reason for the expedition was to spark a Darfuri guerilla movement and spread the civil war to the west, as had been done in the Nuba Mountains and Blue Nile. SPLA chronicler Douglas Johnson suggests that the expedition may have been seen by the SPLA leadership as a diversionary tactic to create a rift in the north, like that created in the south by the splitting of the SPLA-Nasir faction under Riek Machar and Lam Akol.

Ethiopian President Mengistu Haile Mariam, one of the major supporters of the SPLA, had recently been overthrown by the Ethiopian People's Revolutionary Democratic Front. SPLA-Torit (the faction led by Garang) was thus fully engaged in fighting SPLA-Nasir in the south and could not send help to Bolad's force once it ran into difficulty.

There had been little advance preparation done in Darfur and Abdelaziz al-Hilu, who had been named military commander of the expedition, did not receive enough equipment. The force was composed of Dinka fighters, who were perceived as foreigners in Darfur and the Mahdist networks, who were the only organized opposition to the government in Darfur, resented the insertion of a political competitor. The force intended to reach sanctuary in the Marrah Mountains but had to cross an arid expanse controlled by Baggara Arabs in the dry season, in which the only sources of water were the village boreholes that were both few and well-known. Bolad's presence was soon reported by the police, with at least one source indicating that he was reported by the Mahdists.

A force composed of regular army and a horse-mounted militia composed of Beni Halba Arabs quickly tracked and overwhelmed Bolad's force. The military governor of Darfur who directed the force was Tayeb Ibrahim 'Sikha', Bolad's old bodyguard and now both a physician and army colonel. There is no record of their meeting. The Beni Halba district town of Idd al Ghanam ("Well of Goats") was renamed Idd al Fursan ("Well of Horsemen") in celebration of the victory and dozens of Fur villages who had not taken part in defeating Bolad were burned in reprisal.

== Death ==
Bolad was captured alive and taken to Khartoum, where he was tortured to death in January 1992. Even worse, he was captured with his diary in which he had recorded every member of the underground resistance cells he had set up in Darfur. Many of these plotters disappeared into jails or disappeared entirely. Others were released after renouncing rebellion, though in the knowledge that they would continue to be watched by security forces. One history sums up the result, "The Darfurian resistance was set back by ten years." Darfurian dissidents drew a harsh lesson from this, becoming even more distrustful of the SPLA.

With the failure of Bolad's insurrection and the coming to power of Idriss Déby in Chad, and resulting lowering of Libyan involvement in the region, much of Darfur subsided into a state of generalized insecurity that never reached the status of actual peace. The Black Book, a 2000 publication by Darfuri dissidents, lists Bolad as a "martyr".
