= Bedaria tribe =

Tribe in Sudan

Bedaria البديرية
- Ja'ali Arab clan
- Ethnicity: Sudanese Arabs
- Location: Nile river basin until Khartoum
- Parent tribe: Ja'alin
- Population: 800,000
- Language: Sudanese Arabic
- Religion: Sunni Islam

Bedaria (Arabic: البديرية) is an Arab tribe in Sudan. It is part of the Ja'alin tribe and constitutes a large portion of Sudanese Arabs. They speak Sudanese Arabic and are Sunni Muslims.

== History ==
The Bedaria are part of the Ja'alin tribe, who trace their lineage to Abbas, uncle of the Islamic prophet Muhammad. They were at one time subject to the Funj kings, but their position was in a measure independent. At the Egyptian invasion in 1820, the Ja'alin were the most powerful of Arab tribes in the Nile valley. They submitted at first, but in 1822 rebelled and massacred the Egyptian garrison at Shendi with the Mek Nimir, a Ja'ali leader burning Ismail, Muhammad Ali Pasha's son and his cortege at a banquet. The revolt was mercilessly suppressed, and the Ja'alin were thence forward looked on with suspicion. They were almost the first of the northern tribes to join the mahdi in 1884, and it was their position to the north of Khartoum which made communication with General Gordon so difficult. The Ja'alin are now a semi-nomad agricultural people. In common with much of the rest of the Arab world, the gradual process of Arabization in Sudan led to the predominance of the Arabic language and aspects of Arab culture, The population of Sudan includes various tribes who are ethnically Arab, such as the Shaigya, Ja'alin, Shukria, Juhaynah. Burckhardt noted that the Ja'alin of the Eastern Desert are almost indistinguishable from the Bedouin of eastern Arabia.

== Sudanese Arabic ==
It was noted in the late 19th century that the Arabic spoken in Sudan still largely maintained grammatical and dialectical features similar to that introduced from the Arabian Peninsula in the 12th century, and as a result Sudanese Arabic is a form of "pure but archaic Arabic". This, among other features, serves to distinguish the Arabic spoken in Sudan from that of its neighbor, Egypt.

== Lifestyle ==
Some Bedaria still farm and raise livestock along the banks of The Nile river and in Western Sudan, but today they more commonly consist of the bulk of the Sudanese urban population, forming a large part of the merchant class. Although many have moved to cities, such as the Sudanese capital of Khartoum, they still maintain their tribal identity and solidarity. Famous for maintaining ties with their homeland, they keep in contact with their original home and return for frequent visits, especially for marriages, funerals and Muslim festivals.
