= Taʽisha tribe =

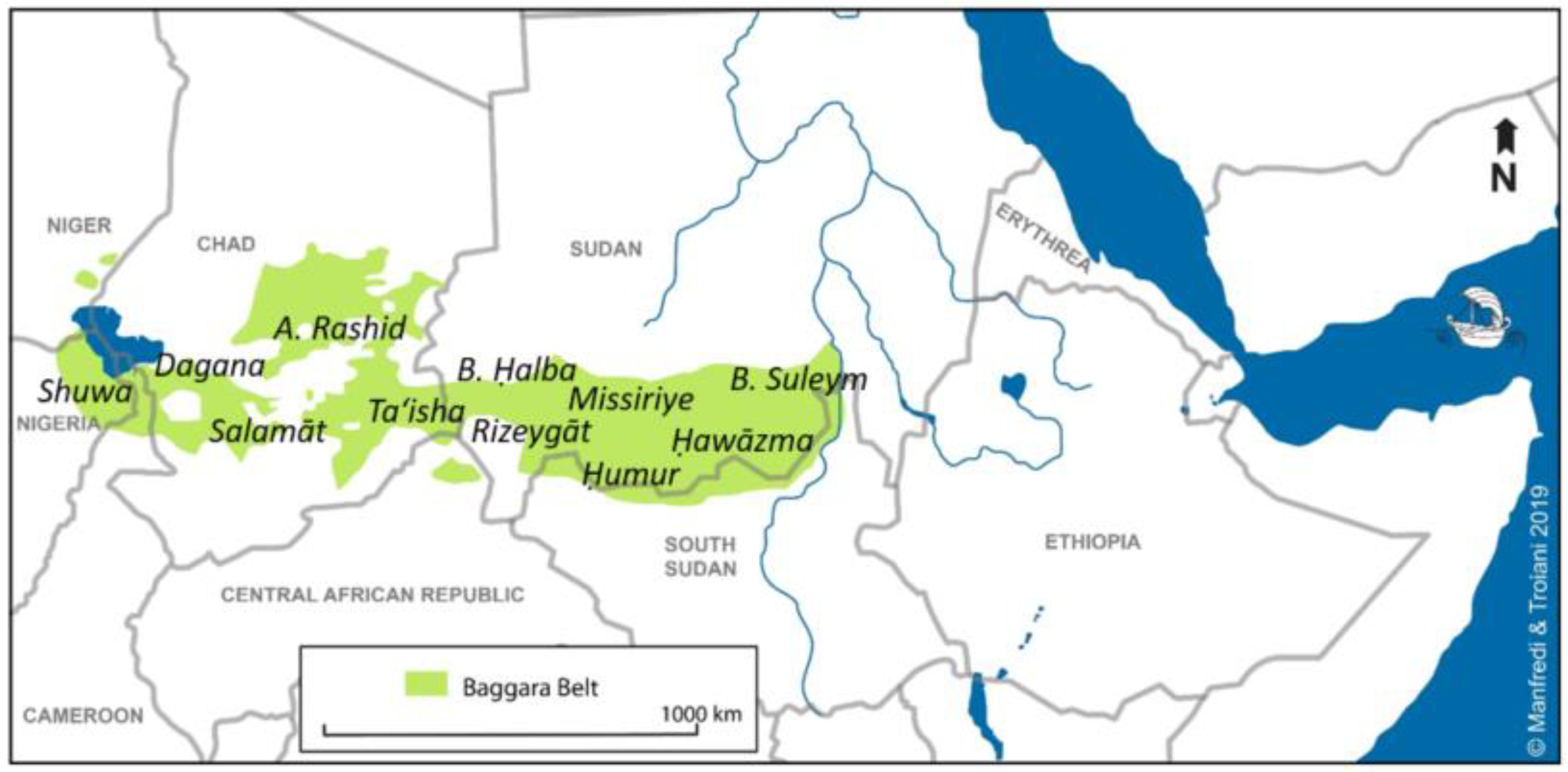
Baggara belt

Ta'isha (Arabic: تعايشة), or Ta'aisha, or Taaisha, one of a series of Arabic-speaking groups collectively called Baggara "cattle people", who live in Sudan, across southern Kordofan, Darfur, as well as Chad. The Ta'aisha tribal homeland is in the far southwest of Darfur, neighbouring to the east the Habbaniya, with whom they are closely related. The Ta'aisha rose to power when one of the members of their tribe, Abdallahi ibn Muhammad, later known as the Khalifa, became an early follower of Muhammad Ahmad, who would later become the Sudanese Mahdi. During the revolution, 'Abdallahi became the strongman of the movement and was designated as senior Khalifa by the Mahdi. Following the Mahdi's death in June 1885, the Khalifa 'Abdallahi ruled the Mahdist state until its destruction by an Anglo-Egyptian army. The Khalifa during his rule brought his tribe to Central Sudan and he went on to make extensive use of his relatives and other fellow Ta'a'isha as soldiers and administrators. Throughout the Mahdist period there was constant tension between the Ta'aisha leaders and the riverain Sudanese. Several Ta'aisha amirs who survived the Mahdiyya became prominent at the re-established Darfur Sultanate of Ali Dinar, one being Arabi Dafallah, who was appointed commander of the Equatorial province with its headquarters at Rejaf under the Khalifa's rule. Having been forced in 1897 to evacuate Equatoria by Belgians advancing from the Congo, he had made his way into southern Darfur where he faced Anglo-Egyptian forces and friendly tribes sent by Kitchener in pursuit of him. He then settled in the area of the present Central African Republic-Darfur border where he came into contact with encroaching French colonial power. After an unsuccessful attack on French outposts in the region he surrendered to Sultan 'Ali Dinar with his men and their arms in 1902, he subsequently lived in Al-Fashir and took part in many of the Sultan's military expeditions. Another one was 'Ali al-Sanusi, who was a Mahdist amir under Mahmud Ahmad in Atbara and fought at Karari after which he escaped to Darfur to be one of 'Ali Dinar's best generals. Under the British colonial rule, He was appointed Nazir of the Ta'aisha in Darfur and rendered valuable service to the new administration.

After the destruction of the Mahdist State, many of the Ta'aisha returned to Darfur, but communities of them settled in Sennar, Gedaref, and White Nile provinces.

Taʽaisha land (hakura) located on the south west of Darfur region, between latitudes 10 - 11° N. Headquarters of Taʽaisha located at Reheid El Berdi, a beautiful city and among the most mesmerizing cities of Western Sudan. The picturesque landscape of Reheid El Berdi city inspired many singers and artists to include the name of the city in their artistic works. One of the best songs sung by the famous singer Saleh ibn Al Badia has part of it says: "and a glimpse of beauty from the beautiful Reheid El Berdi." Singer Saleh ibn Al Badia song, which includes Reheid Al Berdi city, is sensational for Sudanese people just like the famous "America, The Beautiful" lyrics by Ray Charles. The high fascination of Sudanese artists by the landscape of Reheid Al Berdi city is a testament to the beauty of the natural habitat and landscape of Taʽaisha land. Taʽaisha hakura bordered from the north by Beni Halba hakura, where Shaib valley represents their natural border. It extends toward the south until the Republic of Central Africa, where Taʽaisha cross its border during their summer seasonal journey. On the east side, there, they bordered by Habbaniya tribe, while on the west side, bordered by Chad. During their summer seasonal migration, Taʽaisha cross Chad border, just like what they do in the case of the Republic of Central Africa, to graze their animals. In Addition to Taʽaisha hakura in south west of Darfur, they migrated in large numbers during Mahadism and settled in Omdurman city – where residential areas such as Hay Al Umara, Al Shouhada, and Al Malazimiin were all established by Taʽaisha people, who migrated from south west of Dafur – dar Al Taʽaisha.

== See also ==
- Baggara
- Sudan
- Abdallahi ibn Muhammad
