= Abbala Arabs =

African-Arabic ethnic group of the Sahel

The Abbala people are an Afro-Arab ethnic group of the Sahel located in Sudan and Chad. The Abbala are named after their subsistence practice of camel herding.

The term "Abbala" is mostly used in Sudan to distinguish them from the Baggara, a grouping of Arab ethnicities who herd cattle. Although, the two groupings share a common origin from the Juhaynah tribe of the Arabian peninsula and it is a common way to distinguish Rizeigat who herd camels in Northern Darfur and those who herd cows in Southern Darfur. Some of the Abbala people experienced a cultural change to Baggara culture after being pushed from the Sahel region into the savanna. This resulted in a switch in livestock to cattle, which are better adapted to the savanna environment.

== See also ==
- Baggara Arabs
- Janjaweed
