= Messiria people =

Ethnic group in Sudan

Messiria
المسيرية
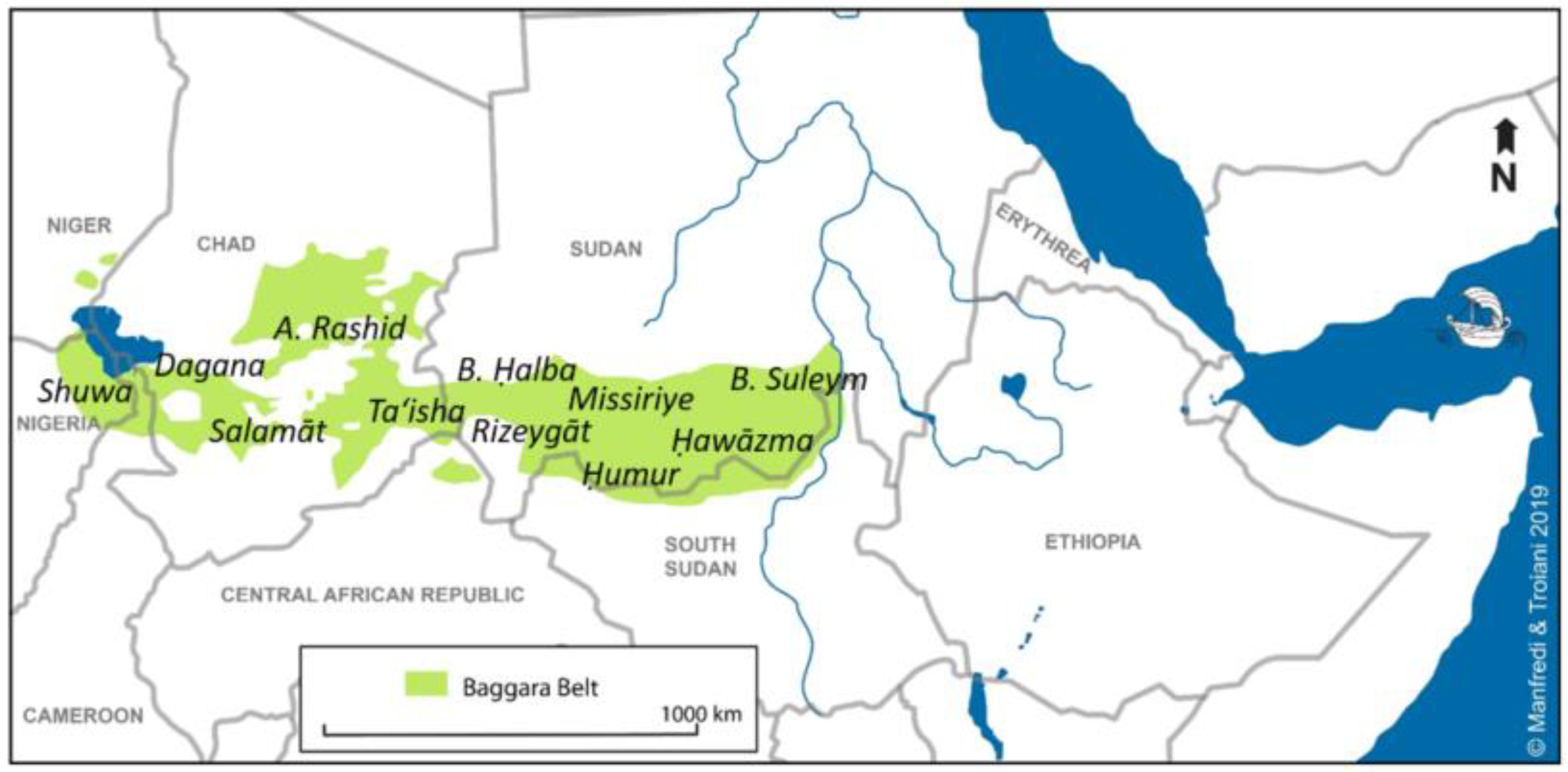
- The 'Baggara Belt', a distribution area of the Baggara Arabs, Messiria is located in its central part, in southern Sudan near the border with South Sudan.

Regions with significant populations
- Sudan: 500,000–1,000,000
- Abyei: few in number

Languages
- Sudanese Arabic and Chadian Arabic

Religion
- Sunni Islam

Related ethnic groups
- Other Baggara Arab tribes

The Messiria (Arabic: المسيرية), also known as Misseriya Arabs, are a branch of the Baggara ethnic grouping of Arab tribes. Their language is primarily Sudanese Arabic, while Chadian Arabic is also spoken by a small number of them in Darfur. Their population estimate varies, perhaps between 500,000 and 1 million in western Sudan, extending into eastern Chad. They are primarily nomadic cattle herders and their journeys are dependent upon the seasons of the year. The use of the term Baggara carries negative connotations as slave raiders, so they prefer to be called instead Messiria.

== Distribution ==
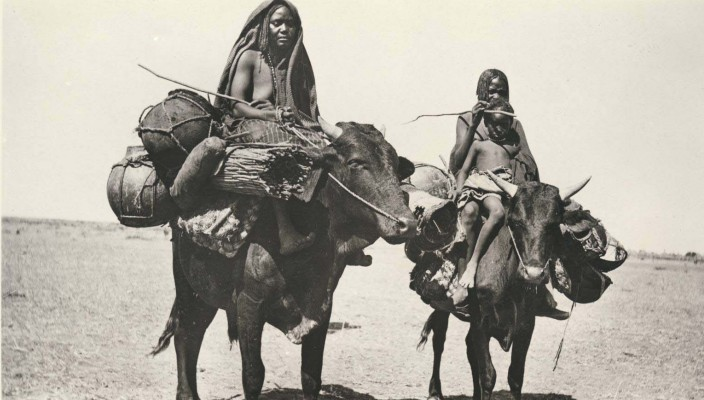
Photograph from early 20th century showing Baggara traveling on ox-back.

The term dar means 'land'. The word al or el or el corresponds to the definite article 'the' in English. The term Dar el Misseriya means 'land of the Messiria'. According to Ian Cunnison (1966), the Arab nomads of the Sudan and Chad are of two kinds, 'camelmen' (Abbala) and 'cattlemen' (Baggara). the Term "Baggara" means simply 'cowman' but the Sudanese apply the word particularly to the nomadic cattlemen, who span the belt of savanna between Lake Chad and the White Nile. This belt of territory has been the homeland of the Baggara Arabs for centuries. Ian Cunnison, referenced above said "history and environment together throw light on their distribution". In Sudan, while the Abbala live in the semi-desert part of the region: northern Kordofan and Darfur, the Baggara, by contrast, live on their southern fringes; occupying the area roughly south of 12 degrees north and extending well into flood basins of the White Nile to the south.

In general the Dar el Messiria or their zones can be divided into three areas:

- Dar el Misseriya in Kordofan, Sudan
- Dar el Misseriya in Darfur, Sudan
- Dar el Misseriya in Chad

The Messiria in the three different zones have been separated for so long that they have developed localized cultural and social differences. The Messiria in Kordofan know little if anything about the Messiria in Darfur and Chad, but they belong to the same tribe and they have similar tribal divisions and diversities.

=== Kordofan ===
In Kordofan, the Messiria occupies the area historically known as West Kordofan, among their well known locations are: Abyei, Babanousa, Muglad, Lagawa, Meiram, and Lake Kailak.

==== Division of tribes ====
The main divisions of Messiria in Kordofan are Messiria Zurug; literally the name means 'the dark ones' and Messiria Humr; means 'the red ones'. These names: Zurug and Humr do 'not' mean in any way that the Zurug are darker in skin color than Humr, but most likely the Humr are darker than Zurug ones. According to MacMichael (1967), the two divisions have become so distinct that the Humr have ceased to rate themselves Messiria. However, in Sudan today, still they are called Messiria Humr and Messiria Zurug and still they acknowledge their common history and ancestry.

The Messiria Humr pastoralists migrate across the four regions of their homeland (Dar el Humr): Babanousa, Muglad, Goz, and Bahr el Arab.

- Messiria Zurug – According to MacMichael (1967), the Zurug have the following divisions:
A – Awlád Um Sálim
B – El Ghazáya
C – El Diráwi
D – El Enenát
E – Awlá Abu Na'amán
F – El Zurug
G – Awlád Haybán

Still there tribal divisions with each tribes.

- Messiria Humr – According to Ian Cunnison (1966), the Humr are divided into:
A —'Ajaira:
1. Fayyarin
2. Awlád Kamil
3. Mezaghna
4. Fadliya
5. Menama
6. 'Addal
B – Felaita:
1. Metanin
2. Ziyud
3. Awlád Serur
4. Jubarat
5. Salamat

=== Darfur ===
The area known as Nitega (نتيقة) is the main distribution base of the Messiria in Darfur, among the landmarks in the area is Mount Karou (جبل كرو).

== Conflict involvement ==
=== Background ===
The Messiria mostly live around Kordofan and migrate south into the Dinka territory. They are marginally represented in Darfur and there they live a semi-sedentary life. The Messiria was once a larger group, but fragmented into smaller groups over time.

The location of Messiria in the Kordofan is at the border zone between Sudan and South Sudan, specially the southern Fringes of their nomadic zone. The Abyei area is claimed by Messiria as well as by Ngok Dinka, to be theirs. While the Messiria are Baggara Arabs, Sunni Muslims and identified as 'northerners', on the other hand, Ngok Dinka are 'southerners' and identified as Black Africans either Christians or animists. Henderson, MacMichael, and Ian Cunnison all attest the presence of Messiria in the eighteenth century. Similar history is also available for the nine Ngok Dinka chiefdoms on the same area. Being both nomads, the Messiria and Dinka coexisted for long time and shared the grazing resources. Those Messiria who have most contact with Ngok Dinka are the Messiria Humr. The Messiria Zurug share most of their land with the Nuba tribes, along the western sides of the national highway connecting Deling to Kadugli; the capital city of South Kordofan and extending to Talodi. On the eastern side of this national highway found the Hawazma tribes sharing the land also with the Nuba tribes. The Nuba are indigenous people, inhabiting the area known as Nuba Mountains of Southern Kordofan and mostly Sunni Muslims, with a bit of Christians and animists. Both Nuba and Dinka are sided with Southern Rebels (SPLA/SPLM) during the civil war, while Messiria and Hawazma sided with Sudanese government.

=== Grazing disputes ===
During the dry season the Misseriya migrate to the Kiir River in Abyei. They call the region the Bahr el Arab.

Both branches of Messiria, the Humr and the Zurug, are involved in historical grazing disputes and isolated fights along their southern borders, either with Dinka, Nuer, or Nuba over grazing and water resources. The traditional fighting was intensified during the first southern guerrilla's fighting, called Anyanya, in 1964 when a whole Messiria nomad camp around Lake Abyyad was massacred by Anyanya fighters, none were spared including children, elderly and brides; many Messiria were abducted and women were raped by the rebels. The Messiria retaliated with a sequence of attacks targeting southern villages and nomadic camps; they abducted children and raided cattle. At the time, the abductions and retaliations became the norm in the region, but, mostly children and cattle were retrieved by local authorities and the spirit and will of coexistence always prevailed.

Such targeting of Messiria nomads by Anyanya fighters lead to Messiria starting to accumulate weaponry to counterbalance the rebel fighters' force. Earlier incidents in the early eighteenth century during British rule, had led to both Hawazma and Messiria taking up arms. In around 1908, the British armed the Nuba to fight against the expansion of the northern Arabs in the region. Weapons, known locally as Marmatoun and Ab’gikra, were as common among Nuba as AK-47 among Baggara Arabs today. All these indicate that the ingredients of ethnic war already exist in the region and the new SPLA war was just an ignition of an existing ethnic chasm in the area.

In Abyei, the Ngok Dinka and Messiria are engaged in territorial disputes.

=== Civil war ===
The Messiria are the first northern tribes and the first Baggara tribes to suffer from the 'southern war'.

The Sudanese government gave the Messiria Arab militia machine guns and ordered them to drive the Nilotic peoples from the Western Upper Nile oil region. They successfully took the Luk Nuer in Bentiu and eastern Jikany Nuer in 1984.

== See also ==
- Baggara Arabs
- Ethnic groups in Sudan
