= Hakura system =

The hakura system was a method of land allocation in the Sultanate of Darfur. The system was based on charters or hawakir (singular hakura) issued by the sultan entitling one to ownership of a certain estate, usually as a freehold, sometimes as fiefs in exchange for tribute or rent. The possessors of hawakir were usually wealthy aristocrats, while most of the estates granted were worked by slaves or bondservants. A distinction can be made between the demesne lands of the estate-holder, whose slaves he personally owned, and the rest of the hakura, from whose inhabitants he exacted tribute and who owned their own slaves.

The hakura system was introduced to Darfur during the reign of Kuuru, the second sultan of the Keira dynasty. When the itinerant court finally settled down around El Fasher towards 1790, the land around the capital was gradually given out to courtiers through hawakir. In exchange these landholders were responsible for tax collection on their estates, which were the most heavily taxed in the country. The right to employ nomads as herders was sometimes granted to hakura holders.

After the conquest of Darfur in 1916, the Anglo-Egyptian government abolished the hakura system and abolished slavery, effecting "the release of Sudanese servants".

== Sources ==
- O'Fahey, R. S. (1986). "Slavery and Society in Dar Fur". In Willis, John R. (ed.). Slaves and Slavery in Africa, Volume 2: The Servile Estate. Florence, KY: Routledge. pp. 82–99.
- de Waal, Alex (2005). Famine That Kills: Darfur. Cary, NC: Oxford University Press.
