= Baggara Arabs =

Nomadic confederation in the Sahel

عرب البقارة
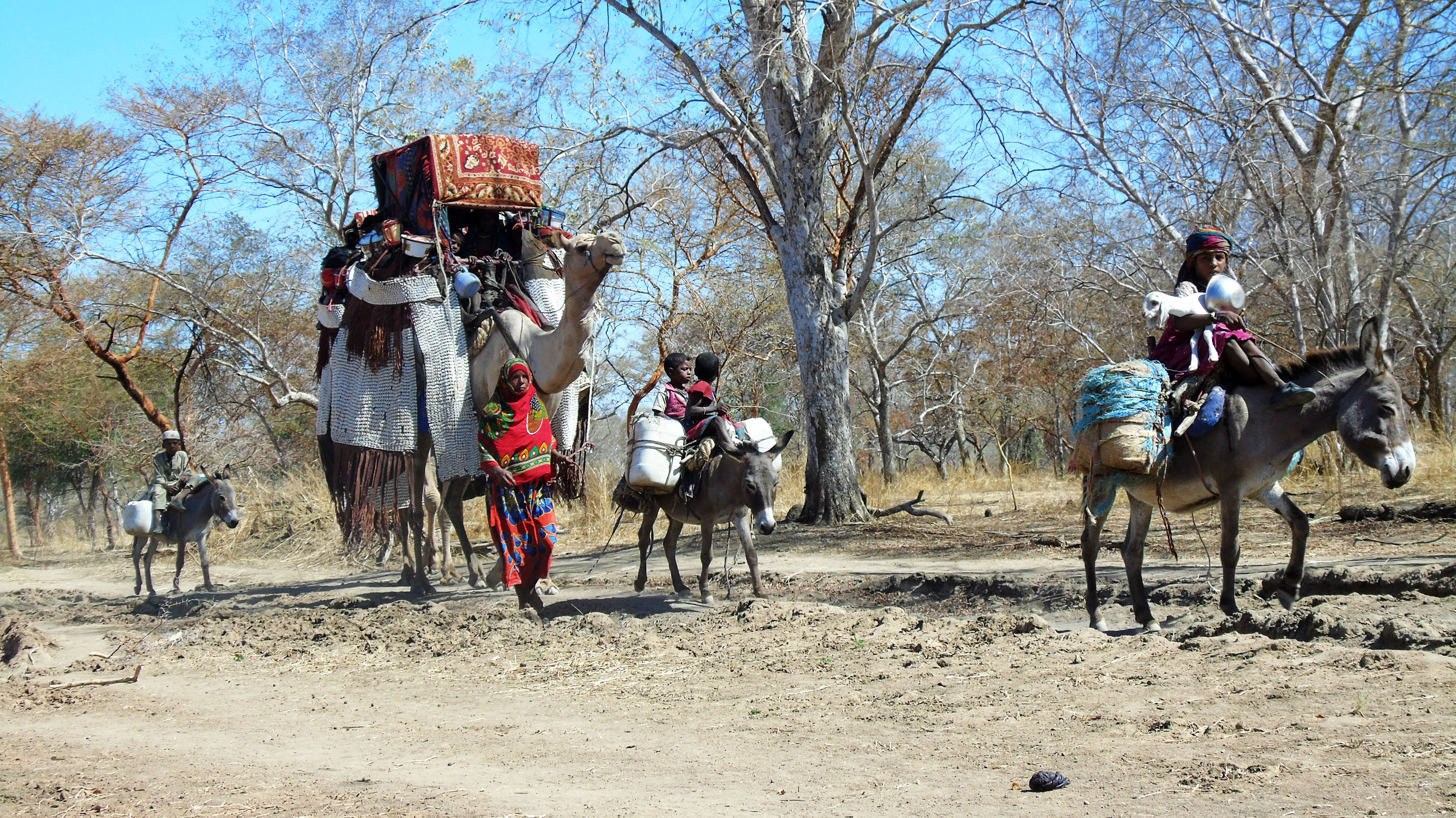
- Caravan of Baggara Arab nomads in Chad

Total population
- ~6 million

Regions with significant populations
- Sudan: 3,700,000+
- Chad: 2,230,000+
- Niger: 150,000
- Cameroon: 125,313 (2000)
- Central African Republic: 43,000

Languages
- Arabic (Chadian Arabic, Sudanese Arabic)

Religion
- Sunni Islam

Related ethnic groups
- Nilo-Saharans and Arabs

The Baggāra (Arabic: البَقَّارَة, romanized: al baqqāra, lit. 'heifer herder'), also known as Chadian Arabs, are a nomadic confederation of people of mixed Arab and Arabized indigenous African ancestry, inhabiting a portion of the Sahel mainly between Lake Chad and the Nile river near south Kordofan, numbering over six million. They are known as Baggara and Abbala in Sudan, and as Shuwa Arabs in Chad, Cameroon and Nigeria.

The Baggāra mostly speak their distinct dialect, known as Chadian Arabic. However the Baggāra of Southern Kordofan, due to contact with the sedentary population and the Sudanese Arab camel herders of Kordofan, has led to some Sudanese Arabic influence on the dialect of that zone. They also have a common traditional mode of subsistence, nomadic cattle herding, although nowadays many lead a settled existence. Nevertheless, collectively they do not all necessarily consider themselves one people, i.e., a single ethnic group. The term "baggara culture" was introduced in 1994 by Braukämper.

The political use of the term baggāra in Sudan is to denote a large group of closely related cattle-owning Arabic speaking tribes that reside traditionally in the Southern parts of Darfur and Kordofan who mixed extensively with the native people they live with in the region, in particular the Fur people, Nuba peoples and Fula people. The bulk of Baggara Arabs live in Chad and Sudan, with small minorities in Niger, Central African Republic, South Sudan, Cameroon, and northern Nigeria. Those who are still nomads migrate seasonally between grazing lands in the wet season and river areas in the dry season.

Their common language is known to academics by various names, such as Chadian Arabic, taken from the regions where the language is spoken. For much of the 20th century, this language was known to academics as "Shuwa Arabic", but "Shuwa" is a geographically and socially parochial term that has fallen into disuse among linguists specializing in the language, who instead refer to it as "Chadian Arabic" depending on the origin of the native speakers being consulted for a given academic project. The term Shuwa is said to be of Kanuri origin.

== Origins and divisions ==
Like other Arabic speaking tribes in Sudan and the Sahel, Baggara tribes claim to have ancestry from the Juhaynah Arab tribe. They are of Arab and Arabized African ancestry.

However the first documented evidence of Arab settlements in this region was in 1391 when the King of Bornu, Abu 'Amr Uthman b. Idris sent a letter to the Mamluk Sultan, Barquq, complaining about the Judham and other Arabs raiding his territory and enslaving his subjects. The name of one of the major Baggara tribes is shared with an important sub-tribe of the Judham Arabs, the Beni Halba. Braukamper dates the formation of the Baggara culture to the 17th century in Wadai, between Bornu and Darfur, where Arabs, who were camel-herders, met the cattle-rearing Fula people migrating east, and out of this contact arose what Braukämper has coined an Arabic baggaara (cattle-herders') culture which today extends from western Sudan (Kordofan and Darfur) into Nigeria (Borno). The Nigerian Arabs are the westernmost representation.

Baggara tribes in Sudan include: the Rizeigat, Ta’isha, Beni Halba, Habbaniya, Salamat, Messiria, Tarjam, and Beni Hussein in Darfur, and the Messiria Zurug, Messiria Humr, Hawazma, Habbaniya and Awlad Himayd in Kordofan, and the Beni Selam on the White Nile. The Messiria estimated at 515,000 people (2012 estimate) and the Rezeigat estimated at 299,000 people (2012 estimate) are probably the largest subtribes of the Baggara in Sudan. There is also a small population of "Shuwa Arabs" from Chad who numbered 90,000 in Sudan according to a 2012 estimate.

The Messiria, one of the largest and most important tribes of the Baggara Arabs are found in Chad, Darfur and Kordofan in Sudan. They numbered 515,000 in Sudan according to a 2012 estimate. The bulk of the Messiria reside in East Kordofan and Chad with a comparatively smaller population in Darfur. In Darfur they are found mainly in Niteiga, an area north of Nyala. Besides the community of Messiria in Niteiga, there are several small Arab groups in Darfur that claim a connection with the Messiria, these are the Ta'alba, Sa'ada, Hotiyya, and Nei'mat. Along with these small groups should be included the Jebel "Messiria" community at Jebel Mun, in West Darfur, that speak a Nilo-Saharan language, Mileri, related to the Tama. The Mileri of Jebel Mun are traditionally not regarded as Arabs but their leaders have been stressing a Messiria Arab descent.

The Baggara tribes have camel-owning relatives, known as the Abbala. The Abbala tribes in Sudan mainly reside in North and West Darfur. The largest and the tribe most synonymous with the term Abbala are the Northern Rizeigat, which consists of 5 sections; the Mahamid, Mahariyya, Nuwaiba, Irayqat and Atayfat. Closely affiliated with them in Darfur are the Awlad Rashid tribe, who mostly live in Chad.

The small community of "Baggara Arabs", they are in fact Abbala, that reside in the southeastern corner of Niger are known as Diffa Arabs for the Diffa Region. The majority migrated from Chad, initially due to the 1974 drought, with more coming in the 1980s because of the war in Chad. Most of the Diffa Arabs claim descent from the Mahamid clan of Sudan and Chad.

== History ==
Map of the Baggara belt

The Baggara of Darfur and Kordofan were the backbone of the Mahdist revolt against Turko-Egyptian rule in Sudan in the 1880s. The Mahdi's second-in-command, the Khalifa Abdallahi ibn Muhammad, was himself a Baggara of the Ta'aisha tribe. During the Mahdist period (1883–98) tens of thousands of Baggara migrated to Omdurman and central Sudan where they provided many of the troops for the Mahdist armies.

After their defeat at the Battle of Karari in 1898, the remnants returned home to Darfur and Kordofan. Under the British system of indirect rule, each of the major Baggara tribes was ruled by its own paramount chief (nazir). Most of them were loyal members of the Umma Party, headed since the 1960s by Sadiq el Mahdi.

The main Baggara tribes of Darfur were awarded "hawakir" (land grants) by the Fur Sultans in the 1750s. As a result, the four largest Baggara tribes of Darfur—the Rizeigat, Habbaniya, Beni Halba and Ta’isha—have been only marginally involved in the Darfur conflict. However, the Baggara have been deeply involved in other conflicts in both Sudan and Chad. Starting in 1985, the Government of Sudan armed many of the local tribes among them the Rizeigat of south Darfur and the Messiria and Hawazma of neighboring Kordofan as militia to fight a proxy war against the Sudan People's Liberation Army in their areas. They formed frontline units as well as Muraheleen, mounted raiders that attacked southern villages to loot valuables and slaves.

The Baggara people (and subgroups) were armed by the Sudanese government to participate in the counterinsurgency against the Sudanese People’s Liberation Army. The first attacks against villages by the Baggara were staged in the Nuba Mountains. The Sudanese government promoted attacks by promising the Baggara people no interference so they could seize animals and land. They formed the precursors to the Janjaweed - an infamous paramilitary.

During the Second Sudanese Civil War thousands of Dinka women and children were abducted and subsequently enslaved by members of the Missiriya and Rezeigat tribes. An unknown number of children from the Nuba tribe were similarly abducted and enslaved. In Darfur, a Beni Halba militia force was organized by the government to defeat an SPLA force led by Daud Bolad in 1990–91. However, by the mid-1990s the various Baggara groups had mostly negotiated local truces with the SPLA forces. The leaders of the major Baggara tribes declared that they had no interest in joining the fighting.

== See also ==
- Abbala Arabs
- Messiria tribe
- Hawazma tribe
- Rizeigat tribe
- Taʽisha tribe
- Habbaniya tribe
- Beni Halba tribe
- Awlad Himayd
- Diffa Arabs

== Sources ==
- Decalo, Samuel (1979). Historical dictionary of Niger. Metuchen, N.J.: Scarecrow Press. ISBN 0810812290.
- de Waal, Alex and Julie Flint. 2006. Darfur: A Short History of a Long War. London: Zed Books. ISBN 1-84277-697-5.
- International Crisis Group (12 October 2007). "Sudan: breaking the Abyei deadlock" (PDF). Archived from the original (PDF) on 4 September 2011.
- Owens, Jonathan (1993). A grammar of Nigerian Arabic. Wiesbaden: Harrassowitz. ISBN 9783447032964.
- Owens, Jonathan (2003). "Arabic Dialect History and Historical Linguistic Mythology". Journal of the American Oriental Society. 123 (4): 715–740. doi:10.2307/3589965. JSTOR 3589965.
- Scheinfeldt, Laura B, et al. 2010. Working toward a synthesis of archaeological, linguistic, and genetic data for inferring African population history. In John C. Avise and Francisco J. Ayala, eds., In the light of evolution. Volume IV: the human condition. Washington, D.C.: National Academies Press. Series: Arthur M. Sackler Colloquia
- United States Department of State. 2008-06-04. Trafficking in Persons Report 2008—Sudan.
- Adam, Biraima M. (30 October 2012). Baggara of Sudan: Culture and Environment: Culture, Traditions and Livelihood. Createspace Independent Pub. ISBN 978-1-4782-4213-0.
- Tubiana, Jérôme; Tanner, Victor; Abdul-Jalil, Musa Adam (2012). Traditional Authorities' Peacemaking Role in Darfur (PDF) (Report). Washington, DC: U.S. Institute of Peace. Archived from the original (PDF) on 13 February 2017.
- Young, Helen M. (2008). Livelihoods, Power, and Choice: The Vulnerability of the Northern Risaygat, Darfur, Sudan. Feinstein International Center.
- Owens, Jonathan (1998). Neighborhood and Ancestry: Variation in the Spoken Arabic of Maiduguri, Nigeria. John Benjamins Publishing Company. ISBN 978-90-272-1834-6.
- Manfredi, Stefano (2012). "Dialect mixing and dialect levelling in Kordofanian Baggara Arabic (Western Sudan)". In Alexandrine Barontini; Christophe Pereira; Ángeles Vincente; Karima Ziamari (eds.). Dynamiques langagières en Arabophonies : variations, contacts, migrations et créations artistiques : hommage offert à Dominique Caubet par ses élèves et collègues (Primeraición ed.). Zaragoza: Universidad de Zaragoza. pp. 141–162. ISBN 9788461614370.
- Macmichael, Harold Alfred (1922). A History of the Arabs in the Sudan - Scholar's Choice Edition. Cambridge: University Press.
- Oliver, Roland, ed. (2008). The Cambridge history of Africa (1050-1600). Cambridge: Cambridge University Press. ISBN 978-0-521-20981-6.
- Hassan, Yusuf Fadl (1967). The Arabs and the Sudan: from the seventh to the early sixteenth century. Edinburgh: University Press.
