= Rizeigat tribe =

Bedouin Baggara tribe in the Darfur region of Sudan

Rizeigat الرزيقات
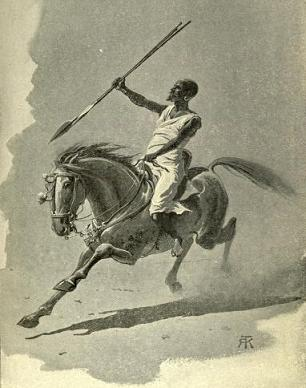
- Rizeigat warrior
- Ethnicity: Baggara Arab
- Location: Darfur (Sudan) or Republic of Chad
- Population: 400,000
- Branches: Mahamid; Mahariya; Nawaiba; Irayqat (Northern Rizeigat); Atayfat (Northern Rizeigat)
- Language: Sudanese Arabic or Chadian Arabic
- Religion: Sunni Islam

The Rizeigat (also spelled Rizigat, Rezeigat, and in standard Arabic, Rizayqat) are a Muslim Arab tribe residing predominantly in Sudan's Darfur region and Chad. The Rizeigat belong to the greater Baggara Arab fraternity of Darfur and Chad, and are a branch of the Juhayanah group. They speak both Sudanese and Chadian Arabic, and are primarily nomadic herders and their journeys are dependent upon the seasons of the year. They are divided into the Abbala (camel-herding) Rizeigat, who live in northern Darfur and Chad, and the Baggara who inhabit south-east Darfur; this division is the result of ecological differences between north and south Sudan, which allowed for two different types of nomadism to evolve over time. Additionally, the Rizeigat are divided into several large clans, notably the Mahamid, Mahariya and Nawaiba. They formed a substantial part of the Janjaweed, who eventually turned into the Rapid Support Forces.

The Baggara Rizeigat backed the Sudanese government during the conflict with the SPLA. They formed the Murahileen, or mounted raiders, who attacked southern villages to loot valuables and slaves. During the Second Sudanese Civil War, thousands of Dinka women and children were abducted and subsequently enslaved by members of the Messiria and Rizeigat tribes. An unknown number of children from the Nuba tribe were similarly abducted and enslaved.

During the Darfur conflict, the Abbala Rizeigat were instrumental in the Sudanese government's counterinsurgency campaign, gaining notoriety as part of the Janjaweed militia. Musa Hilal of the Mahamid, and Mohamed Hamdan Dagalo a.k.a. Hemedti of the Mahariya are the two most prominent leaders.

== Northern Rizeigat ==
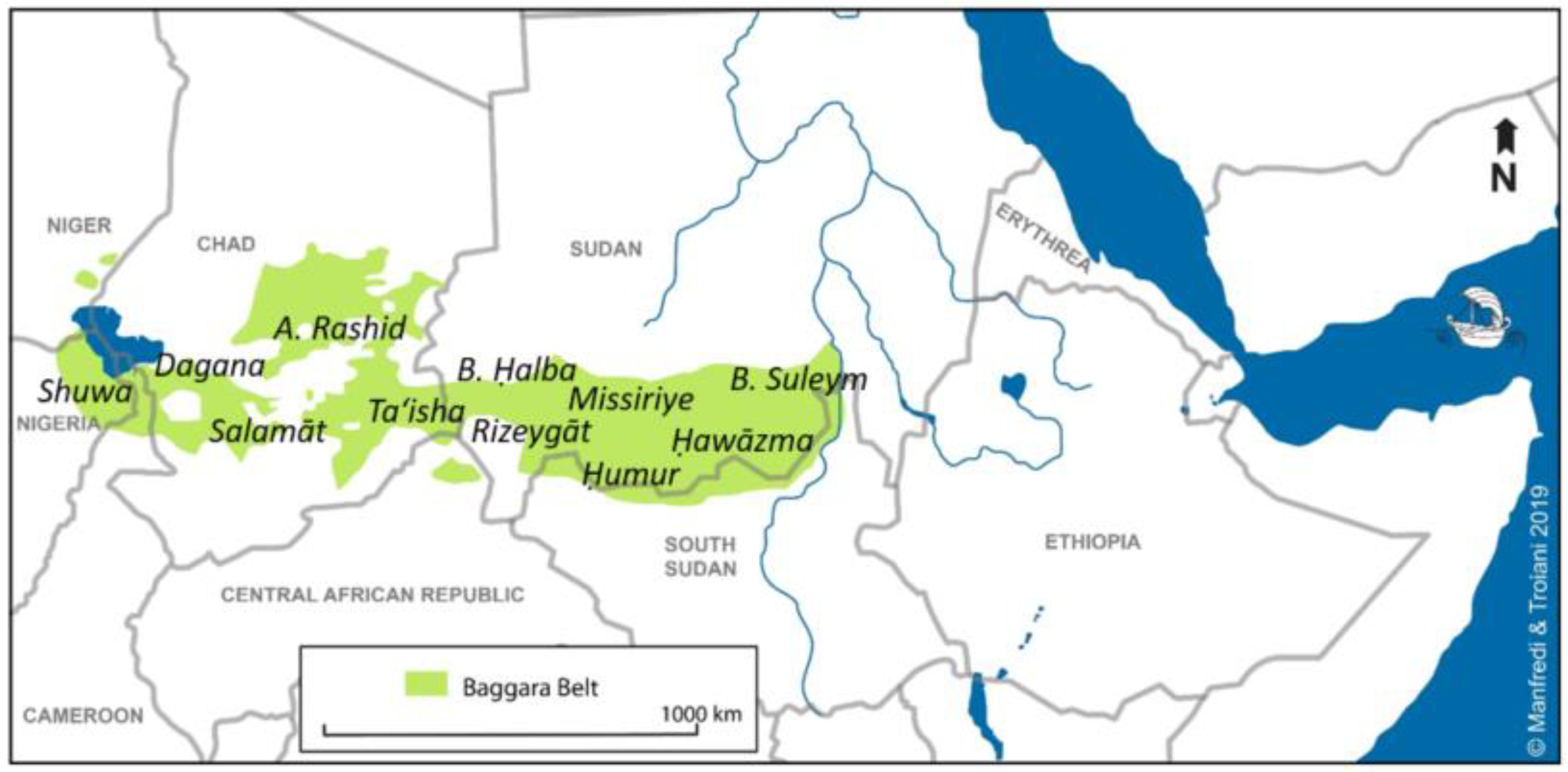
Baggara belt.

The Northern Rizeigat are Arab nomads who herd camels. The northern Rizeigat have the Mahamid, Mahariya and Nuwaiba sections in common with the southern Rizeigat but there are two other sections that are solely Abbala - these are the Atayfat and the Irayqat. The Northern Rizeigat are traditionally found in Northern Darfur and in Eastern Chad, around Arada in the Wadi Fira region (formerly known as the Biltine prefecture), but have migrated throughout Darfur from Northern Darfur and Eastern Chad, in particular to West Darfur. They possess no Dar (tribal homeland) in Darfur unlike their Southern cousins, only Damra - temporary settlements allocated to Arab nomads within land under the jurisdiction of other tribes.

=== Camels ===
Camels are at the center of status and identity. Ownership of camels is directly related to the power of the tribe and defines the nomads relationships to land, resources, and farmers. Owning camels has produced systems that allowed for a symbiotic relationship between the nomads and settled farmers. However, certain pressures have negatively affected this livelihood. These range from population growth and increases in farming (including associated economic and commercial agriculture) to climate change and restrictive legislation. This challenged their lifestyle and led to feeding competition between the nomads and farmers, which shepherds in inevitable conflict.

=== Education ===
Power is closely linked to education and it fuels how they understand themselves, their status, and attaining power. The nomads are aware of their lack of education and therefore influence. This leads to a desire for education which pressures them to convert to a sedentary lifestyle with the idea of making education more accessible.

== Southern Rizeigat ==
They are cattle herders and live in East Darfur with their tribal capital at Ed Daein, under the authority of the Madibbo family.

The Baggara Rizeigat were a constant thorn for the Fur Sultans, residing in south-east Darfur. The sultans had never been able to bring the Baggara tribes under their control, the Rizeigat particularly were experts at guerrilla warfare suited to their homeland and used space and time to draw the Fur forces into a series of disasters. German explorer Gustav Nachtigal who was in Darfur in the 19th century, documented in detail the failure of the 18 military campaigns sent against the Rizeigat in the mid 19th century by Fur Sultan Muhammad al-Husayn in his 35-year reign.

The Baggara Rizeigat played a major role in the Mahdist revolt in Darfur. After a leadership dispute that led to the removal of Madibbo Ali as chief of the tribe, he went East and joined up with the Mahdi who then sent him back to Darfur to raise a rebellion in Southern Darfur against the Turco-Egyptian administration which he did successfully as he won several victories against government forces and gained support from the Berti, Habbaniya and Beni Halba tribes. In 1882, the governor of Darfur, Slatin Pasha assembled a force made up of 2,000 regular troops along with a support of 7,00 irregulars from among sections of the Birgid, Zaghawa, Messiria, Beigo, and others hostile to the local elites who aligned themselves to the Mahdist movement such as Madibbu Ali. This force was decisively defeated by Madibbo Ali's Rizeigat and allies. In 1883, Slatin Pasha surrendered to Madibbo Ali.

== See also ==
- Baggara
- Abbala
