= Juhaynah =

Arab tribe

Banu Juhaynah بنو جهينة
- Quda'i Arab tribe
- Ethnicity: Arab
- Nisba: Juhani
- Location: Hejaz, Sudan, Egypt
- Descended from: Juhaynah bin Zayd bin Layth bin Sud bin Aslam bin al-Haf bin Quda'ah
- Parent tribe: Banu Quda'a
- Language: Arabic
- Religion: Sunni Islam (main) and neo-Kaysanites in Yanbu (claim)

The Juhaynah (/dʒʊˈhaɪnə, -ˈheɪ-/ juu-HY-nə, -HAY-; Arabic: جهينة) are a nomad tribe of the Arabian Peninsula and the largest clan of Banu Quda'a. They are one of the most powerful Arabian tribes that rule important parts of the Arabian Peninsula. The clan remains prevalent in the Arabian Peninsula, Saudi Arabia mostly in the region of Madinah and the cities of Yanbu, Umluj, Alshabaha, Tabuk, and Jeddah. They are also present in Jordan, among other regions, and Egypt. Additionally, in Sudan they are present in large numbers in the eastern region due to the migrations of Juhani tribes into Sudan during the 11th century, as attested by Ibn Khaldun. These include the Rufaa people, the Shukria clan, and the Kababish tribe. Moreover, the Baggara Arabs and Abbala in Darfur and Chad also claim a Juhani background, though there is some evidence that the Baggara Arabs and Abbala are from Banu Judham and not Juhaynah.

== Culture and spirituality ==
The Juhaynah were the first Arab tribe to entirely convert to Islam. They are known to be fond of education and writing and had many poets. They were well educated before being committed to Islamic teachings. They were also known to be powerful, and many Juhani participated in battles at the time.

One of its members, 'Abd ad-Dar b. Hudayb, to build a Qawdam (an artifact that could compete with the Kaaba in Mecca), since the time of Jahiliyya able to attract many pilgrims and create a trade fair where he concluded lucrative business.

== Relations with Yathrib ==
Relations with Yathrib were overall good, so much so that, at the Battle of Bu'ath of 617, the Juhaynah fought with the Arab tribe of Banu Khazraj, while Badr were on the side of Banu Aws. They reached an agreement with Muhammad, once these installed himself with his Muslim followers to Medina, which allowed them not to embrace the Islamic religion which, however, later converted, becoming perhaps the first tribal group fighting alongside Muslims the affirmation of their cause.

In the conquest of Mecca (629 CE) it was present with 800 warriors and 50 knights, although figures Al-Tabari provides are more generous still, with approximately 1,400 men.

The tribe (part of which had emigrated to Egypt) remained faithful to Islam during the Ridda wars and participated later, at the time of the second Caliph Umar, to the conquest of Egypt, some of them remained to reside in Egypt when the Caliph Umar appointed one of the prophet companion and Juhaynah leaders Uqbah ibn Amir Aljuhani as the governor of Egypt.

== Last man to be entered into jannah ==
The name of the last person coming out of Jahannam and the last to enter Jannah, mentioned in Sahih Muslim, hadith 188, will be Juhaynah and the name of his tribe will also be Juhaynah, is a narration is recorded in the book 'Gharaibu Malik’. However, the Muhaddithun have declared the narration unreliable.

== Notable people ==
- Uqba ibn Amir, companion of Muhammad
- Ma'bad al-Juhani, Qadari And the first person to talk about fate in Islam
- Abdullah Awad Al Juhany, one of the Imams of the Great Mosque of Mecca
- Deena Aljuhani, Saudi princess and businesswoman

== See also ==
- Tribes of Arabia
- Quda'a
