= Habbaniya tribe =

The Habbaniya, or Habbania, (Arabic: الهبانية) are a Sunni Muslim tribe of the nomadic Bedouin Baggara people in the plains of Sudan's Darfur, North Kurdufan, and South Kurdufan provinces

== See also ==
- Baggara
