= List of Sudanese states by population =

Sudan is divided into 18 states, or wilyat. The state with the largest population is Khartoum with 7,993,851 and the state with the smallest population is the Northern State with 936,235 as of 2018. As of 2015, the Northern state is the only state in Sudan not to have surpassed 1 million in total population.

== Total ==
Rank	Name	Population, 2018
1	Khartoum	7,993,235
2	South Darfur	5,353,025
3	Gezira	5,096,920
4	North Kordofan	3,174,029
5	Kassala	2,519,071
6	Central Darfur	2,499,000
7	White Nile	2,493,880
8	North Darfur	2,304,950
9	Al Qadarif	2,208,385
10	South Kordofan	2,107,623
11	Sinnar	1,918,692
12	West Darfur	1,775,945
13	River Nile	1,511,442
14	Red Sea	1,482,053
15	West Kordofan	1,178,537
16	East Darfur	1,119,451
17	Blue Nile	1,107,623
18	Northern	936,255

== Density ==
Rank	Name	Density
1	Khartoum	

== See also ==
- States of Sudan
- List of Sudanese states by Human Development Index
- List of current state governors in Sudan
