= List of Sudanese states by Human Development Index =

This is a list of states of Sudan by sub-national Human Development Index as of 2023.

Rank	Region	HDI (2023)
Medium human development
1	Khartoum	0.630
2	Northern	0.628
3	River Nile	0.609
4	Gezira	0.553
Low human development
5	Red Sea	0.526
–	Sudan	0.511
6	Sennar	0.499
7	White Nile	0.498
8	North Darfur	0.471
9	North Kordofan	0.468
10	Kassala	0.460
11	Qadarif	0.458
12	West Darfur	0.449
13	South Darfur	0.445
14	South Kordofan	0.440
15	Blue Nile	0.428

== See also ==
- List of countries by Human Development Index
