= Districts of Sudan =

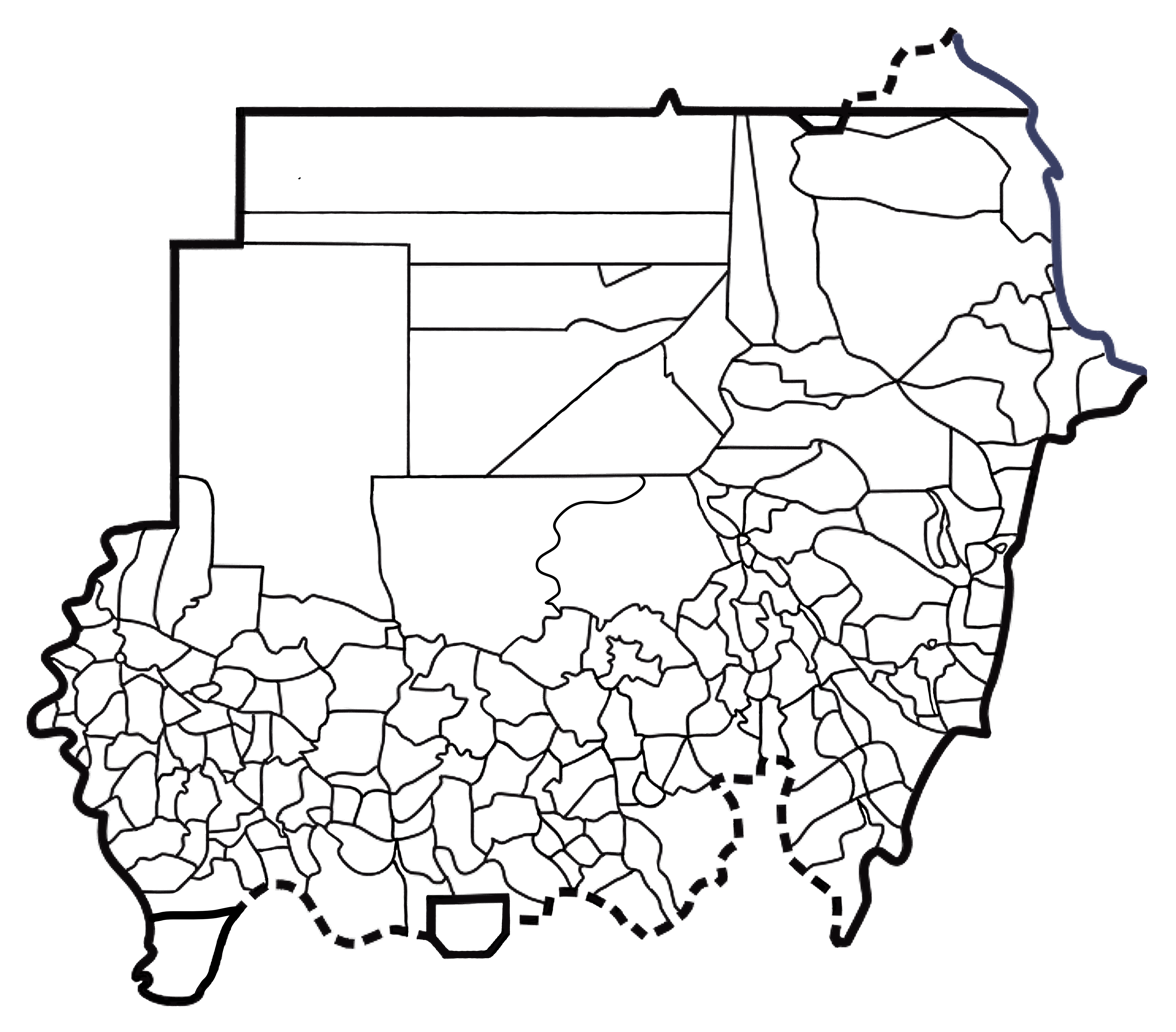
Districts of Sudan

== Districts of Sudan ==
Sudan's 18 states together contain 188 districts, according to data from the United Nations Office for the Coordination of Humanitarian Affairs (OCHA). Current information is available from the Humanitarian Data Exchange.

| English name | Arabic name | State | Area (km^{2}) |
|---|---|---|---|
| Abyei PCA area | إدارية أبيي | Abyei PCA | 10,537 |
| Al Hasahisa | الحصاحيصا | Aj Jazirah | 4,163 |
| Al Kamlin | الكاملين | Aj Jazirah | 1,826 |
| Al Manaqil | المناقل | Aj Jazirah | 3,740 |
| Al Qurashi | القرشي | Aj Jazirah | 3,136 |
| Janub Al Jazirah | جنوب الجزيرة | Aj Jazirah | 3,251 |
| Medani Al Kubra | مدني الكبري | Aj Jazirah | 587 |
| Sharg Al Jazirah | شرق الجزيرة | Aj Jazirah | 6,519 |
| Um Algura | أم القري | Aj Jazirah | 3,931 |
| Al Kurmuk | الكرمك | Blue Nile | 9,728 |
| Ar Rusayris | الروصيرص | Blue Nile | 4,024 |
| At Tadamon - BN | التضامن - ن ق | Blue Nile | 7,985 |
| Baw | باو | Blue Nile | 7,247 |
| Ed Damazine | الدمازين | Blue Nile | 1,894 |
| Geisan | قيسان | Blue Nile | 3,471 |
| Wad Al Mahi | ود الماحي | Blue Nile | 3,817 |
| Azum | أزوم | Central Darfur | 3,207 |
| Bendasi | بندسي | Central Darfur | 5,421 |
| Gharb Jabal Marrah | غرب جبل مرة | Central Darfur | 2,362 |
| Mukjar | مكجر | Central Darfur | 6,239 |
| Shamal Jabal Marrah | شمال جبل مرة | Central Darfur | 1,095 |
| Um Dukhun | أم دخن | Central Darfur | 2,723 |
| Wadi Salih | وادي صالح | Central Darfur | 3,311 |
| Wasat Jabal Marrah | وسط جبل مرة | Central Darfur | 448 |
| Zalingi | زالنجى | Central Darfur | 6,154 |
| Abu Jabrah | أبو جابرة | East Darfur | 6,060 |
| Abu Karinka | أبو كارنكا | East Darfur | 2,453 |
| Ad Du'ayn | الضعين | East Darfur | 858 |
| Adila | عديلة | East Darfur | 3,856 |
| Al Firdous | الفردوس | East Darfur | 3,029 |
| Assalaya | عسلاية | East Darfur | 4,826 |
| Bahr Al Arab | بحر العرب | East Darfur | 20,468 |
| Shia'ria | شعيرية | East Darfur | 3,733 |
| Yassin | يس | East Darfur | 5,493 |
| Al Butanah | البطانة | Gedaref | 19,610 |
| Al Fao | الفاو | Gedaref | 2,146 |
| Al Fashaga | الفشقة | Gedaref | 5,194 |
| Al Galabat Al Gharbyah - Kassab | القلابات الغربية - كساب | Gedaref | 4,139 |
| Al Mafaza | المفازة | Gedaref | 1,381 |
| Al Qureisha | القريشة | Gedaref | 3,544 |
| Ar Rahad | الرهد | Gedaref | 2,130 |
| Basundah | باسندة | Gedaref | 3,734 |
| Gala'a Al Nahal | قلع النحل | Gedaref | 3,861 |
| Galabat Ash-Shargiah | القلابات الشرقية | Gedaref | 4,109 |
| Madeinat Al Gedaref | مدينة القضارف | Gedaref | 119 |
| Wasat Al Gedaref | وسط القضارف | Gedaref | 9,577 |
| Halfa Aj Jadeedah | حلفا الجديدة | Kassala | 1,525 |
| Madeinat Kassala | مدينة كسلا | Kassala | 132 |
| Reifi Aroma | ريفى أروما | Kassala | 5,951 |
| Reifi Gharb Kassala | ريفى غرب كسلا | Kassala | 1,960 |
| Reifi Hamashkureib | ريفى همش كوريب | Kassala | 3,901 |
| Reifi Kassla | ريفى كسلا | Kassala | 2,818 |
| Reifi Khashm Elgirba | ريفى خشم القربة | Kassala | 12,081 |
| Reifi Nahr Atbara | ريفى نهر عطبرة | Kassala | 2,383 |
| Reifi Shamal Ad Delta | ريفى شمال الدلتا | Kassala | 7,443 |
| Reifi Telkok | ريفى تلكوك | Kassala | 5,634 |
| Reifi Wad Elhilaiw | ريفى ود الحليو | Kassala | 4,870 |
| Bahri | بحري | Khartoum | 3,200 |
| Jebel Awlia | جبل أولياء | Khartoum | 780 |
| Karrari | كرري | Khartoum | 2,916 |
| Khartoum | الخرطوم | Khartoum | 167 |
| Sharg An Neel | شرق النيل | Khartoum | 9,471 |
| Um Bada | أمبدة | Khartoum | 3,465 |
| Um Durman | أم درمان | Khartoum | 1,218 |
| Al Fasher | الفاشر | North Darfur | 8,502 |
| Al Koma | الكومة | North Darfur | 776 |
| Al Lait | اللعيت | North Darfur | 2,796 |
| Al Malha | المالحة | North Darfur | 194,628 |
| As Serief | السريف | North Darfur | 6,201 |
| At Tawisha | الطويشة | North Darfur | 10,867 |
| At Tina | الطينة | North Darfur | 5,624 |
| Dar As Salam | دار السلام | North Darfur | 2,969 |
| Kebkabiya | كبكابية | North Darfur | 4,446 |
| Kelemando | كلمندو | North Darfur | 7,225 |
| Kernoi | كرنوي | North Darfur | 8,614 |
| Kutum | كتم | North Darfur | 14,001 |
| Melit | مليط | North Darfur | 16,116 |
| Saraf Omra | سرف عمرة | North Darfur | 1,483 |
| Tawila | طويلة | North Darfur | 3,483 |
| Um Baru | أم برو | North Darfur | 16,392 |
| Um Kadadah | أم كدادة | North Darfur | 13,090 |
| Ar Rahad | الرهد | North Kordofan | 5,675 |
| Bara | بارا | North Kordofan | 11,564 |
| Gebrat Al Sheikh | جبرة الشيخ | North Kordofan | 50,968 |
| Gharb Bara | غرب بارا | North Kordofan | 11,280 |
| Sheikan | شيكان | North Kordofan | 8,408 |
| Soudari | سودري | North Kordofan | 81,591 |
| Um Dam Haj Ahmed | أم دم حاج أحمد | North Kordofan | 4,992 |
| Um Rawaba | أم روابة | North Kordofan | 11,671 |
| Ad Dabbah | الدبة | Northern | 45,194 |
| Al Burgaig | البرقيق | Northern | 1,422 |
| Al Golid | القولد | Northern | 65,658 |
| Delgo | دلقو | Northern | 56,620 |
| Dongola | دنقلا | Northern | 48,382 |
| Halfa | حلفا | Northern | 129,237 |
| Merwoe | مروي | Northern | 17,612 |
| Agig | عقيق | Red Sea | 7,554 |
| Al Ganab | القنب | Red Sea | 70,408 |
| Dordieb | درديب | Red Sea | 12,267 |
| Hala'ib | حلايب | Red Sea | 40,647 |
| Haya | هيا | Red Sea | 22,406 |
| Jubayt Elma'aadin | جبيت المعادن | Red Sea | 40,407 |
| Port Sudan | بورتسودان | Red Sea | 564 |
| Sawakin | سواكن | Red Sea | 1,968 |
| Sinkat | سنكات | Red Sea | 8,037 |
| Tawkar | طوكر | Red Sea | 11,351 |
| Abu Hamad | أبو حمد | River Nile | 31,673 |
| Ad Damar | الدامر | River Nile | 37,020 |
| Al Buhaira | البحيرة | River Nile | 18,537 |
| Al Matama | المتمة | River Nile | 9,272 |
| Atbara | عطبرة | River Nile | 8,617 |
| Barbar | بربر | River Nile | 13,449 |
| Shendi | شندي | River Nile | 11,836 |
| Abu Hujar | أبو حجار | Sennar | 3,829 |
| Ad Dali | الدالي | Sennar | 8,096 |
| Ad Dinder | الدندر | Sennar | 14,138 |
| As Suki | السوكي | Sennar | 2,780 |
| Sennar | سنار | Sennar | 5,532 |
| Sharg Sennar | شرق سنار | Sennar | 3,156 |
| Sinja | سنجة | Sennar | 1,724 |
| Al Radoum | الردوم | South Darfur | 25,528 |
| Al Wihda | الوحدة | South Darfur | 1,077 |
| As Salam - SD | السلام - ج د | South Darfur | 5,094 |
| As Sunta | السنطة | South Darfur | 3,497 |
| Beliel | بليل | South Darfur | 2,384 |
| Buram | برام | South Darfur | 3,582 |
| Damso | دمسو | South Darfur | 1,714 |
| Ed Al Fursan | عد الفرسان | South Darfur | 4,435 |
| Gereida | قريضة | South Darfur | 2,408 |
| Kas | كاس | South Darfur | 3,495 |
| Kateila | كتيلا | South Darfur | 2,581 |
| Kubum | كبم | South Darfur | 3,008 |
| Mershing | مرشنج | South Darfur | 1,140 |
| Nitega | نتيقة | South Darfur | 2,939 |
| Nyala Janoub | نيالا جنوب | South Darfur | 258 |
| Nyala Shimal | نيالا شمال | South Darfur | 3,146 |
| Rehaid Albirdi | رهيد البردي | South Darfur | 7,476 |
| Sharg Aj Jabal | شرق الجبل | South Darfur | 2,900 |
| Shattaya | شطاية | South Darfur | 1,830 |
| Tulus | تلس | South Darfur | 2,149 |
| Um Dafoug | أم دافوق | South Darfur | 5,185 |
| Abassiya | العباسية | South Kordofan | 4,231 |
| Abu Jubayhah | أبو جبيهة | South Kordofan | 20,973 |
| Abu Kershola | أبو كرشولا | South Kordofan | 3,090 |
| Al Buram | البرام | South Kordofan | 1,754 |
| Al Leri | الليري | South Kordofan | 7,421 |
| Al Quoz | القوز | South Kordofan | 2,618 |
| Ar Rashad | الرشاد | South Kordofan | 1,770 |
| Ar Reif Ash Shargi | الريف الشرقي | South Kordofan | 2,146 |
| At Tadamon - SK | التضامن - ج ك | South Kordofan | 3,443 |
| Delami | دلامي | South Kordofan | 4,094 |
| Dilling | الدلنج | South Kordofan | 3,705 |
| Ghadeer | غدير | South Kordofan | 6,652 |
| Habila - SK | هبيلة - ج ك | South Kordofan | 6,096 |
| Heiban | هيبان | South Kordofan | 3,402 |
| Kadugli | كادقلي | South Kordofan | 2,166 |
| Talawdi | تلودي | South Kordofan | 3,642 |
| Um Durein | أم دورين | South Kordofan | 2,127 |
| Ag Geneina | الجنينة | West Darfur | 2,744 |
| Beida | بيضا | West Darfur | 1,824 |
| Foro Baranga | فور برنقا | West Darfur | 780 |
| Habila - WD | هبيلة - غ د | West Darfur | 2,314 |
| Jebel Moon | جبل مون | West Darfur | 3,910 |
| Kereneik | كرينك | West Darfur | 5,797 |
| Kulbus | كلبس | West Darfur | 2,922 |
| Sirba | سربا | West Darfur | 1,966 |
| Abu Zabad | أبو زبد | West Kordofan | 5,212 |
| Abyei | أبيي | West Kordofan | 4,435 |
| Al Dibab | الدبب | West Kordofan | 9,072 |
| Al Idia | الأضية | West Kordofan | 7,328 |
| Al Khiwai | الخوي | West Kordofan | 9,173 |
| Al Lagowa | لقاوة | West Kordofan | 7,388 |
| Al Meiram | الميرم | West Kordofan | 5,554 |
| An Nuhud | النهود | West Kordofan | 12,277 |
| As Salam - WK | السلام - غ ك | West Kordofan | 9,135 |
| As Sunut | السنوط | West Kordofan | 6,892 |
| Babanusa | بابنوسة | West Kordofan | 2,357 |
| Ghubaish | غبيش | West Kordofan | 7,246 |
| Keilak | كيلك | West Kordofan | 8,829 |
| Wad Bandah | ود بندة | West Kordofan | 11,410 |
| Ad Diwaim | الدويم | White Nile | 5,871 |
| Aj Jabalain | الجبلين | White Nile | 3,974 |
| Al Gitaina | القطينة | White Nile | 5,592 |
| As Salam / Ar Rawat | السلام / الراوات | White Nile | 8,701 |
| Guli | قلي | White Nile | 3,049 |
| Kosti | كوستي | White Nile | 1,572 |
| Rabak | ربك | White Nile | 1,690 |
| Tendalti | تندلتي | White Nile | 4,376 |
| Um Rimta | أم رمتة | White Nile | 3,169 |

== History ==
Before the independence of South Sudan in 2011, the States of Sudan were subdivided into 133 districts. The maps on this page represent the boundaries as they existed in 2006.

With the adoption of the Interim National Constitution of Sudan and the Interim Constitution of Southern Sudan, the ten states of South Sudan are, however, now divided into counties.

The historical districts are listed below, by state:

=== Al Jazirah ===
1. Al Kamlin District
2. East al Gazera District
3. North al Gazera District
4. Al Managil District
5. South al Gazera District
6. Um Al Gura District
7. Wad Madani District

=== Al Qadarif ===
1. Al Faw District
2. Al Gadaref District
3. Al Rahd District
4. East Galabat District
5. West Galabat District
6. Al Fushqa District
7. Butana District
8. Qala al-Nahl District
9. Al-Quresha District

=== Blue Nile ===
Districts of Blue Nile

1. Ad Damazin District
2. Al Roseires District
3. Geissan District
4. Baw District
5. Al Kurumik District

=== Kassala ===
Districts of Kassala

1. Seteet District
2. Nahr Atbara District
3. Kassala District
4. Al Gash District
5. Hamashkorieb District

=== Khartoum ===
Districts of Khartoum

1. Khartoum District
2. Um Badda District
3. Omdurman District
4. Karary District
5. Khartoum Bahri District
6. Sharg En Nile District
7. South Khartoum District

=== North Darfur ===
(Not representing the present state structure)

Districts of North Darfur

1. Mellit District
2. Kutum District
3. Kabkabiya District
4. Al Fasher District
5. Um Kadada District

=== North Kurdufan ===
Districts of North Kurdufan

1. Sowdari District
2. Jebrat al Sheikh District
3. Sheikan District
4. Bara District
5. Um Rawaba District

=== Northern ===
Districts of Northern Sudan

1. Wadi Halfa District
2. Dongola District
3. Merawi District
4. Addabah District

=== Red Sea ===
Districts of Red Sea

1. Halayeb District
2. Port Sudan District
3. Sinkat District
4. Tokar District

=== River Nile ===
Districts of River Nile

1. Abu Hamad District
2. Berber District
3. Ad Damer District
4. Atbara District
5. Shendi District
6. Al Matammah District

=== Sennar ===
Districts of Sennar

1. Sennar District
2. Singa District
3. Ad Dinder District

=== South Darfur ===
(Not reflecting the present state structure)

Districts of South Darfur

1. Kas District
2. Edd al Fursan District
3. Nyala District
4. Shearia District
5. Al Deain District
6. Adayala District
7. Buram District
8. Tulus District
9. Rehed al Birdi District

=== South Kurdufan ===
Districts of South Kurdufan

1. Dilling District
2. Rashad District
3. Abu Jubaiyah District
4. Talodi District
5. Kadugli District
6. Lagawa District
7. As Salam District
8. Abyei District

=== West Darfur ===
(Not representing the present state structure)

Districts of West Darfur

1. Kulbus District
2. Al Geneina District
3. Zallingi District
4. Jebel Marra District
5. Habillah District
6. Wadi Salih District
7. Mukjar District

=== West Kordofan ===
1. Lagawa District
2. As Salam District
3. Abyei District
4. Wad Banda
5. En Nahud
6. Abu Zabad
7. Ghubaysh District
8. Babanusa
9. Muglad
10. Keilak District
11. Al Sunut District
12. Al-Meiram

=== White Nile ===
Districts of White Nile

1. Ad Douiem District
2. Al Gutaina District
3. Kosti District
4. Al Jabalian District

== See also ==
- Districts of South Sudan
- States of Sudan
