= Umm Ruwaba =

Umm Ruwaba أم روابة
- City

- Location in Sudan
- Coordinates: 12°54′16″N 31°12′28″E
- Country: Sudan
- State: North Kurdufan
- District: Umm Ruwaba
- Elevation: 450 m (1,490 ft)
- Time zone: UTC+03:00 (EAT)

Umm Ruwaba, also Umm Ruwabah (Arabic: أم روابة; Ruaba and Umm Ruaba), is a city in the state of North Kordofan in Sudan and is the capital of the Um Rawaba District. By road it is located 147 kilometres (91 mi) southeast of El Obeid, and 184 kilometres (114 mi) west of Rabak. Founded by the Ottoman Empire in late 1820s , it is at the junction of important roads and camel caravan routes.

== History ==
On 27 April 2013, the town was attacked by the Sudan Revolutionary Front, a rebel alliance. The government was able to 'contain' the attack, but sparked local protests over lack of security in the region.

== Geography ==
Umm Ruwaba lies in southern central Sudan in the semi-arid region of the Sahel. It has an average annual precipitation of 300 to 450 millimeters. Local aquifers are considered to be productive and are the source of water for many wells in the region. Water is typically extracted from depths of 300 to 400 ft, although some boreholes have been dug as far as 1000 ft. Geologically it lies in the Tertiary-Quaternary Umm Ruwaba Basin, composed mainly of fine-grained lacustrine and fluviatile sediments.

== Economy ==
Lying in this part of the Sahel, Umm Ruwaba is prone to recurring periods of drought, land degradation and famine. The famine of 1983–1985 had a severe impact on the area and caused food riots in the city. Its principal crops are millet and sorghum for home consumption, and sesame for sale in the local markets, and the city is an important storage area for many farmers in the district. The Sudan Roads and Bridges Department has been looking to improve road communications between the city and El Obeid.

== Demographics and religion ==
The main tribes in the city are Jawamma and Shanabla peoples. Traditionally it is an Islamic area, but a 1980 report documented that an anti-Islamic organisation had converted some 40 families in Umm Ruwaba from Islam to Christianity.

== Notable people ==
- Mamoun Beheiry, economist, first commissioner of the Bank of Sudan and first president of the African Development Bank, (born October 1, 1925)
