= Darfur (disambiguation) =

Darfur is a region of western Sudan, administratively divided into five federal states: Central Darfur, East Darfur, North Darfur, South Darfur and West Darfur. It may also refer to:

- Sultanate of Darfur, historical state
- War in Darfur, a conflict in Darfur
  - Darfur genocide (2003–2005), a systematic killing of ethnic Darfuri people as part of the conflict
- Darfur (film), a 2009 film directed by Uwe Boll
- Darfur, Minnesota, a city in the United States
