= Shearia District =

Shearia
- District
- Country: Sudan
- State: South Darfur

Shearia is a district of South Darfur state, Sudan.
