= Vehicle registration plates of Sudan =

Sudan requires its residents to register their motor vehicles and display vehicle registration plates.

Image	First issued	Design	Serial format	Serials issued	Notes
	2009	32 cm x16 cm Bilingual Arabic and English	1L-2345		The Letter L indicates the State; The letter خ/KH indicates Khartoum State for example
