= Al Deain District =

Al Deain
- District
- Country: Sudan
- State: South Darfur

Al Deain is a district of South Darfur state, Sudan.
