= Al Tekyna =

Village in Sudan

Al Tekyna التكينة
- Village
- Location within Sudan
- Coordinates: 15°12′57.65″N 33°3′33.82″E
- Country: Sudan
- State: Sennar State
- City: Sennar
- Established: 1903

Population (2020)
  - Total: 500
- Time zone: UTC+2:00 (CAT)

Al Tekyna (التكينة) is a village located on the Blue Nile, in Sennar, Sudan, where the Nile borders on the southern and western side of the forest, in the north the village bordered by big agricultural land, this land honored by the people in the village the lands are cultivated in the autumn season, and most of the villagers depend in their food on the corn and millet produced by this land, which have now been turned into farms and are within the villages of Local and Wa Al Abbas east of Sennar, Al-Tekina village is characterized by its strategic location and is the first village after the bridge connecting Sennar city, followed by the Banat village, Abogaili then Al-Arkikiin village.

== Population ==
The population of Al-Tekina village proximity is about 500, their people work in agriculture and trade and some of them work in the field of education, where the village includes the largest number of teachers in the locality of Wad al-'Abbas.

== History ==
Al-Tekina was founded in 1903 by three families who came from western Sudan to the Blue Nile region, where these families captured the area and worked in the field of agriculture and grazing, where they owned a large animal wealth that was used for their living.
