= Nyala District =

Nyala
- District
- Interactive map of Nyala
- Country: Sudan
- State: South Darfur

Nyala is a district of South Darfur state, Sudan.
