= Maalia people =

Ethnicity from Sudan

The Maalia people are an ethnic minority in Sudan. They are a sub-tribe of the greater Baggara Tribes. Most of them follow Islam as their religion and are pastoralist. The tribes centre of territory is considered to be Adila in East Darfur. They speak Sudanese Arabic, a regional variety of the Arabic language.
