= Al-Quresha District =

Al-Quresha القريشة
- District
- Country: Sudan
- State: Al Qadarif

Area
  - Total: 32,000 km^{2} (12,000 sq mi)

Population (2008)
  - Total: 83,394
  - Density: 2.6/km^{2} (6.7/sq mi)

Al-Quraysha is a District of Al Qadarif State, Sudan. The Atbara River flows through Al-Quraysha.

== Neighborhoods ==
Within Al-Quraysha there are about 62 residential neighborhoods, the most prominent of which is the western neighborhood (Al-Subhab), which is considered the largest neighborhood and represents the economic center of Al-Quraysha. Al-Subhab is the largest in the locality and has 3 schools and 2 kindergartens that were built through community efforts.
