= Tulus District =

Tulus
- District
- Country: Sudan
- State: South Darfur

Tulus is a district of South Darfur state, Sudan.
