= Al Jabalian District =

Al Jabalian
- District
- Country: Sudan
- State: White Nile

Al Jabalian, also spelled Aj Jabalain, is a district in White Nile state, Sudan. The largest settlement in the district is El Jebelein.

== History ==
In January 2014, more than 5,500 South Sudanese refugees fled to Al Jabalian, according to an OCHA report, as part of a wider influx into White Nile State.
