= Sinkat District =

Sinkat
- District
- Interactive map of Sinkat
- Country: Sudan
- State: Red Sea

Sinkat is a district of Red Sea state, Sudan.
