= Seteet District =

Seteet
- District
- Interactive map of Seteet
- Country: Sudan
- State: Kassala

Seteet is a district in Kassala state, Sudan.
