= Habillah District =

Habillah
- District
- Country: Sudan
- State: West Darfur

Population (2008)
  - Total: 132,045

Habillah is a district of West Darfur state, Sudan.
