= North al Gazera District =

North al Gazera
- District
- Country: Sudan
- State: Al Jazirah

North al Gazera is a district of Al Jazirah state, Sudan.
