= Kassala District =

Kassala
- District
- Interactive map of Kassala
- Country: Sudan
- State: Kassala

Kassala is a district of Kassala state, Sudan.
