= Al Gadaref District =

Al Gadaref
- District
- Country: Sudan
- State: Al Qadarif

Al Gadaref is a district of Al Qadarif state, Sudan.
