= Khartoum Bahri District =

Khartoum Bahri
- District
- Interactive map of Khartoum Bahri
- Country: Sudan
- State: Khartoum

Khartoum Bahri is a district of Khartoum state, Sudan.
