= Shukeiri =

Village in White Nile State, Sudan

- Country: Sudan
- State: White Nile State

Government
  - Type: village
- Time zone: UTC+2 (CAT)

Shukeiri is a village in White Nile State, Sudan.

== History ==
On 11 March 2026, at least 17 people mostly schoolgirls, were killed at a school after drone strikes. The only clinic in the village was destroyed. 10 people who were wounded were taken to al-Duwaim Hospital, the nearest major medical facility to the village.
