= Al Kurumik District =

Al Kurumik
- District
- Country: Sudan
- State: Blue Nile

Al Kurumik is a district in Blue Nile state, Sudan.
