= Al Gash District =

Al Gash
- District
- Country: Sudan
- State: Kassala

Al Gash is a district in Kassala state, Sudan.
