= Um Badda District =

Um Badda
- District
- Country: Sudan
- State: Khartoum

Um Badda is a district of Khartoum state, Sudan.
