= Khartoum District =

Khartoum
- District
- Interactive map of Khartoum
- Country: Sudan
- State: Khartoum

Khartoum is a district of Khartoum state, Sudan.
