= Kadugli District =

Kadugli
- District
- Country: Sudan
- State: South Kordofan

Kadugli is a district of South Kordofan state, Sudan.
