= Al Roseires District =

Al Roseires
- District
- Interactive map of Al Roseires
- Coordinates: 11°8′N 34°7′E
- Country: Sudan
- State: Blue Nile

Al Roseires is a district of Blue Nile state, Sudan.
