= July 2023 Omdurman airstrike =

Dar es Salaam al-Amriya airstrike
- Part of Battle of Khartoum (2023-2025) in the Sudanese civil war
- Location: Dar es Salaam al-Amriya, Omdurman, Khartoum State, Sudan
- Date: July 8, 2023
- Target: Rapid Support Forces
- Attack type: Air strike
- Deaths: 22 (per Khartoum State Ministry of Health); 31 (per RSF)
- Injuries: Dozens
- Perpetrator: Sudanese Armed Forces

On July 8, 2023, during the Battle of Khartoum, an airstrike by the Sudanese Armed Forces in the Dar es Salaam al-Amriya neighborhood of western Omdurman, Khartoum State, Sudan killed 22 civilians. The SAF said that they were targeting positions of the Rapid Support Forces in the neighborhood.

== Background ==
On April 15, 2023, the Rapid Support Forces attempted to overthrow Sudanese Armed Forces commander-in-chief and de facto head of the government Abdel Fattah al-Burhan, sparking a civil war where RSF militants and Sudanese soldiers battled in every major city. Khartoum and its sister cities of Omdurman and Khartoum Bahri were battlegrounds, and much of the cities were destroyed in the fighting. The SAF would routinely conduct airstrikes in areas that RSF fighters were present, but the RSF often wore civilian clothing and blended into the civilian population. At the time, local SAF forces at a police station were fending off an RSF offensive in the neighborhood.

== Airstrike ==
The airstrike on Dar es Salaam al-Amriya occurred at dawn on July 8, just west of the Libyan market. It was coupled with other SAF attacks that same day in Khartoum Bahri, Halfaya Bridge, Shambat Bridge, and the neighborhoods of Al-Mamoura and Arkaweet in eastern Khartoum. A resident of the al-Thawra neighborhood of Omdurman said "It’s the first time for us that there have been continuous strikes at this level from every direction."

The Khartoum State Ministry of Health reported that 22 civilians were killed in the airstrike. The United Nations rehashed this number. The Rapid Support Forces released a video of the aftermath of the airstrike, showing a destroyed building. The RSF claimed that 31 civilians were killed, dozens of civilians were injured and many homes were destroyed as a result of the airstrike. A video by the Ministry of Health showed people burying bodies. The Sudanese government only said that they were conducting combing operations against the RSF.
