= Al Fasher District =

Al Fasher
- District
- Interactive map of Al Fasher
- Country: Sudan
- State: North Darfur

Population (2008)
  - Total: 504,080

Al Fasher is a district of North Darfur state, Sudan.
