= Dubasiyin people =

Dubasiyin is an ethnic group licing in White Nile State, Sudan. This ethnic group speaks Sudanese Arabic. They are part of the Arab, Sudan people cluster. The primary religion practiced by the Dubasiyin is Islam.
