= Kutum District =

Kutum
- District
- Interactive map of Kutum
- Country: Sudan
- State: North Darfur

Population (2008)
  - Total: 150,687

Kutum is a district of North Darfur state, Sudan.
