= Lagawa District =

Coordinates: 11°20′N 28°57′E

Lagawa
- District
- Interactive map of Lagawa
- Country: Sudan
- State: West Kordofan

Lagawa (Ar: لقاوة) is a district of West Kordofan state, Sudan.
