= Talodi District =

Talodi
- District
- Country: Sudan
- State: South Kordofan

Talodi is a district of South Kordofan state, Sudan.
