= Sennar District =

Sennar
- District
- Country: Sudan
- State: Sennar

Sennar is a district of Sennar state, Sudan.
