= Buronga, Sudan =

Buronga بورونجا
- Location in Sudan
- Coordinates: 11°58′N 23°15′E
- Country: Sudan
- State: Central Darfur
- Time zone: UTC+2 (CAT)

Buronga (Arabic: بورونجا) is a town in Central Darfur, Sudan.
