= Berber District =

Berber
- District
- Country: Sudan
- State: River Nile

Berber is a district of River Nile state, Sudan.
