= Gereida =

Gereida قريضة
- Location within Sudan
- Coordinates: 11°16′36″N 25°8′30″E
- Country: Sudan
- State: South Darfur
- Control: Rapid Support Forces

Government
  - Type: locality
- Elevation: 484 m (1,588 ft)

Population (2008)
  - Total: 120,000 (Oxfam estimate)
- Time zone: UTC+2 (CAT)

Gereida (Arabic: قريضة), also spelled Gerida or Graida, is a large town located in south-western Sudan at an altitude of 1,586 feet (483 meters) above sea level. It lies about 100 km south of Nyala, and has a population of over one hundred thousand people.

As of 2006, Gereida was the largest camp for internally displaced people (IDPs) in Darfur, with an estimated 120,000 people. Due to an escalation of violence against civilians in the area, rapid growth led to potentially enormous health risks, with tens of thousands of people living in extremely basic, overcrowded conditions.

In June 2007, Oxfam decided to permanently close down its humanitarian operation in Gereida, citing reluctance by authorities there to improve security and stop attacks on aid workers.

In November 2013, an inter-agency field mission to Gereida led by the UN Office for the Coordination of Humanitarian Affairs (OCHA) found that 1,976 families (9,880 people) had fled to the area since April 2013. This includes people displaced by fighting between the Sudanese Armed Forces (SAF) and the Sudan Revolutionary Front (SRF).
