= As Salam District =

As Salam
- District
- Country: Sudan
- State: South Kordofan

As Salam is a district of South Kordofan state, Sudan.
