= South Khartoum District =

South Khartoum
- District
- Country: Sudan
- State: Khartoum

South Khartoum is a district of Khartoum state, Sudan.
