= Buronga =

Buronga may refer to:

- Buronga, New South Wales
- Buronga, Sudan
