= University of Gezira =

Public university in Wad Madani, Sudan

- جامعة الجزيرة
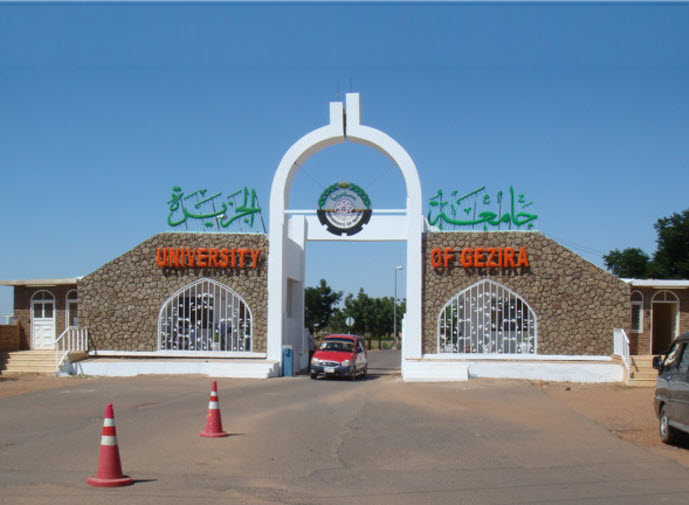
- Type: Public
- Established: 1975; 51 years ago
- Vice-Chancellor: Suliman
- Location: Wad Madani, Sudan; 14.3858°N 33.5295°E
- Campuses: 5
- Website: en.uofg.edu.sd

The University of Gezira, or U of G, is a public university located in Wad Madani, Sudan. It is a member of the Federation of the Universities of the Islamic World.

== History ==
The University Of Gezira (U. of G.) was founded in 1975 as a public university, and the first Sudanese university outside of Khartoum with approval and support from former President Gaafar Nimeiry. The initiative was spearheaded by Mohamed Obeid El-Mubarak, who went on to serve as its first President, as well as Abdelrahim Mahmoud, the former regional governor, and Mohamed-Elhaj Mekki Medani, who went on to serve as Director of Services. The university is near one of the biggest agricultural projects in Africa – the Gezira Project, historically the backbone of the Sudanese economy.

Initially, there were only a handful of schools, but today the university has expanded to fourteen schools and four institutes. At its prime in the late 20th century, the university was seen as one of the top institutions in the country, at times even rivaling the University of Khartoum. One of its most famous members of faculty being Former Minister of Finance and Economic Planning, Ibrahim El-Bedawi.

During the Sudanese civil war (2023–present) the Rapid Support Forces attacked the town of Bara, North Kordofan and plundered the University of Gezira in Wad Madani.

== History and development ==
The first university guide quotes causes and justifications for establishing the University of Gezira as follows: "The mission of the universities is to seek science and knowledge, reveal the secrets of nature, build human civilization in all its dimensions, assess the balance of justice, support the inherent spiritual values, raise the word of truth and prosperity, eliminate the injustice and corruption, build the mind and conscience of mankind, develop expertise and skills, enrich and refine the talents, and achieve all that through constructive cooperation in an atmosphere of brotherhood, love and fidelity".

The University of Gezira was established to serve the community, and to link education with the requirements of development and make it more relevant to human and environmental needs. This is evident from the content of educational mission entrusted to it and identified in its function "to study the environment of Sudan and in particular the rural environment, to identify the issues and conduct research around it". With this concept, the University of Gezira began its path exploring problems of society, training professional cadre capable of utilizing the potential of the rural areas of Sudan and conduct basic and applied scientific research to serve the rural community.

=== Campuses ===
The university of Gezira is currently spread in nine campuses in Gezira State and one campus in Northern State.

Campuses in the city of Wad Medani include:

- The University City in Neshaishiba is located in the northern outskirt of the city of Wad Medani, and includes the university administration, central deanships, Faculty of Agricultural Sciences, Engineering and Technology, Economics and Rural Development, Textiles, and the National Institute for Development of Horticultural Exports, the Sugar Institute and the University of Gezira Farm.
- Elrazi campus, is located in the southern part of the city of Wad Medani and includes Faculties of Medicine, Pharmacy, Applied Medical Sciences, Medical Laboratory Science, Dentistry, and Mathematical and Computer Sciences, and the Water Management and Irrigation Institute, The National Cancer Institute and the National Oilseeds Processing and Research Institute, in addition to the Education Promotion Center, University Press and University of Gezira Consulting House.
- The Hantoub campus houses the Faculty of Education - Hantoub and the Institute of Islamization of Knowledge.

There are six other University campuses in different locations in the Gezira state, including:

- the Faculty of Educational Sciences which is located in Elkamlin town,
- the Faculty of Education – El Hassahissa located in El Hassahisa town,
- the Faculty of Animal Production located in El Manaqil
- the Faculty of Health and Environmental Sciences located in Elhush in the South al Gazera District,
- the Faculty of Developmental Studies located in Um Al Gura District
- the Faculty of Communication Sciences in Fadasi, Wad Medani District

In Al Dabbah, Sudan (Northern state), there is the National Institute for Desert studies.

==== Enrollment ====
The number of students enrolled in the University of Gezira has reached 18,221 students registered for bachelor's degree, 3350 for technical Diploma and 3622 students in postgraduate programs. This has coincided with the development of the infrastructure of Faculties and Institutes and furnishing.

== Colleges ==
- Faculty of Medicine
- Faculty of Pharmacy
- Faculty of Dentistry
- Faculty of Medical Laboratories
- Faculty of Engineering and Technology
- Faculty of Mathematical Computer Science
- Faculty of Education
- Faculty of Communication Science
- Faculty of Economics and Rural Area Development
- Faculty of Textile
- Faculty of Animal Production
- Faculty of Agriculture and Natural Resources
- Faculty of Health Sciences and Environment
- Faculty of Applied Medical Science

=== Faculty of Medicine ===
The school is a home for a WHO collaborating center, a core center for the public health education and research. The school model of community-oriented education has been contributing to the development of health awareness in the region. It has also grown to be a highly active research center for endemic diseases such as malaria and bilharziasis. Both of which are water-born diseases mostly related to agricultural activities of the region residents.

The teaching hospital of the faculty of medicine is the largest hospital outside Khartoum. It serves the whole region, acting as a main referral center. A separate children's hospital is also a major training site for the medical students.

==== Students ====
There are usually five to six batches at one time and 230 students in each batch. The FMUG offers scholarship to neighbouring African and Arab countries and a good number of foreign students are enrolled on private basis.

==== Graduates ====
Thirty-three batches were graduated so far amounting to over 3,660 doctors working in the Sudan and abroad. Many of the graduates are staff members in FMUG.

==== International links ====
The school has a strong international links and the following are examples:

===== Network - TUFH, T =====
The Network is an international NGO collaborating with WHO and other organizations. FMUG is a founding member and a full member in the Network. Two of the staff were executive committee members 1983-1984/1993-1997. Two of the students of FMUG were executive committee members, the current 2019-2021 student network organization (SNO) international president is Yassein Elhussein "finalists student at FMUG". FMUG is constantly participating in the TUFH annual conferences since its establishment. About 200 abstracts have been submitted and presented in posters sessions. The faculty delegation included students and a community representative (this is unique to FMUG delegate since 2000).

===== WHO =====
There is close collaboration between the WHO and the school through the following:

- Educational Development Centre (EDC). This is a collaborative centre with WHO
- WHO partly sponsors community activities
- WHO is a member of the administrative committee for the Blue Nile Institute for Training and Research

===== Other institutes =====
- Suez Canal University, Egypt (before its establishment and up to now)
- College of Physicians and Surgeons, Pakistan (since 1980, Gezira founding dean helped in establishing and up to now, helped in establishing and development of its EDC)
- Columbia University, USA
- Maastricht University, Netherlands
- McMaster University, Canada
- Arab Board for Medical Specializations
- University of Dundee, Scotland
- University of Manchester, England (became community-oriented in 1994)
- University of Sciences and Technology, and Faculty of Medicine, Taiz, Yemen (Gezira staff have helped establishment on innovative basis)
- College of Medicine, Arab Gulf University, Bahrain
- Centre for Education Development (CED) now Dept. of Medical Education at the Medical Centre, University of Illinois, Chicago, USA.
- Faculty of Medicine and Health Sciences King Saud University, Abha
- Dubai Medical College for Girls (the Gezira curriculum was provided to the founding dean in contribution to the initial curriculum planning)

==== Services provided by the school ====
===== Educational Development Centre =====
Established in 1978 with the enrollment of the first batch of students, it is the only national centre collaborating with WHO. Its main objectives are:

- Staff development
- Strengthening the educational media support
- Strengthening the evaluation tools
- Develop and implement a strategy for Arabicization of the curriculum
- Conduct periodic curriculum reviews and evaluations
- Teacher training and evaluation in curriculum of paramedicals.
- Strengthening the health area team approach.
- Helping other medical schools in COME/CBE/PBL curriculum development
- Conduct national workshops on COMB/CBE and PBL
- Strengthening the national health programme

Activities:

- Educational workshops
- Curriculum development workshops
- Curriculum evaluation workshops 2 times
- Workshop for teachers from medical schools in Iran
- Curriculum revision of FMUG three times
- Review of anaesthesia curriculum
- Design of FMUG examination office
- Workshops on problem based learning four times
- Curriculum design for the following:
  - Faculty of Medicine, Darfur (El Fashir) University, Sudan
  - Problem-based learning in Faculty of Medicine Ahfad University for Women, Sudan
  - Faculty of Medicine University of Science and Technology, Yemen
  - Village midwives’ school, Sudan
  - Nurse midwives’ school, Sudan
- Postgraduate in Forensic Medicine, Sudan National Board for Medical Specialization
  - Faculty of Applied Medical Sciences U of G, Sudan
  - Faculty of Medicine University of Sennar, Sudan
  - Faculty of Medicine, International University of Africa, Sudan
  - Curriculum of medical assistants, Sudan.

The centre runs the following courses periodically for the new and old staff of the faculty and the neighbouring by health sciences institutes:

- Instructional methods
- Evaluation methods
- Educational planning of COME
- Instructional/evaluation methods and planning for community-oriented medical school
- Baby-friendly hospital initiative training courses I, II & III.
- Arabicization of FMUG curriculum I, II & III
- Evaluation of Arabicization workshop
- Leadership development workshop
- Health insurance workshops I and II
- Workshop in reproductive health
- Institutionalization of partnership with the health system and community
- Course training for health visitors in reproductive health
- Workshop on prevention of malaria

===== Primary Health Care and Health Education Centre =====
The centre was established in 1995 as a result of joining of the primary health care centre (established in 1985 in collaboration with Columbia University) and the health education centre (established in 1986 in collaboration with WHO). The main objectives of the centre are to improve the primary health care and health education services management, research and resources.

Activities of the centre:

- Training courses in primary health care and health management. 38 courses were conducted for 900 trainees (doctors and other health professionals)
- Formation of health area policy which was then adopted as a national system for the health service in Sudan.
- Training courses in health area management. 28 courses for a total of 112 health teams.
- Four training courses in health education for the EMRO Region of WHO
- Diploma of public health and master's degree of health education in collaboration with the postgraduates studies department.

===== Health-related services =====
- Initiation of the health area policy from the Rural Residency Course and adoption on a national scale by the health system.
- Partnership with regional Ministry of Health.

===== Institute of Nuclear Medicine, Molecular Biology and Oncology =====
It is a diagnostic, treating and training centre established in 1995. It has four departments: Department of Nuclear Medicine, Department of Oncology and Radiotherapy. Department of Medical Radiation physics and Department of Molecular Biology.

===== Blue Nile Research and Training Institute =====
Started its activity in 1995 as a continuation of the Blue Nile Health Project 1980–1990, as an academic institute under supervision of FMUG with collaboration of WHO and state Ministry of Health. The main activities of the centre focus on malaria as a major health problem in Sudan. The intended persons are doctors and other health and health-related personnel.

==== Community development ====
The school participates through its intra and extra-curriculum activities in community, involving mobilization and development

==== Student training ====
The students of FMUG are trained in all community levels; 300 villages were covered through the interdisciplinary Field Training Research and Rural Development Programme and more than 1,500 families were covered through the Primary Health Care Centre Practice and Family Medicine Programme.

==== Activities in the villages ====
In a study in 30 villages presented recently in the Net-work conference, Brazil 2001 the students activities were as follows: - Establishment and development of water resource in 17 villages - Establishment and development of health units in 10 villages - Help in introduction of electricity in one village - Establishment of 2 classroom in a school - Establishment of T.B. prevention unit - Health education programme and environmental health programmes in all the villages. - Indicators of results of student intervention (Referring to the above-mentioned study) - Increase percentage of use of pure water - Increase percentage of use of gas instead of charcoal and wood - Increase percentage of use of latrines - Increase percentage of use of insecticides in homes - Increase percentage of use of antenatal care services - Decrease incidence rate of diarrhoeal diseases, febrile illnesses and ARI in children less than 5 years. - Decrease in the incidence rate of malaria and bilharziasis - Impact of student's training on the families - 1500 families were covered through the PHCCP & FM modules. The families got great benefit from the student raining. In study presented in the Network conference, Brazil 2001. - 68% of students assisted in solving the families’ problems (health, economic or social problems) - 88% of the families used some of the elements of PHC as a result of intervention by students - 82% of the students applied the element of the PHC in solving the family problems. Staff activities - Participate with community in all cultural and social aspects - Responding to seasonal crisis and disasters - Involvement in rural development committees

==== Postgraduate activities ====
The FMUG offers postgraduate degrees in both professional and social and health sciences either separately or in collaboration with the Sudan Council for Medical Specialties:

- Diploma of Public Health
- Master in Health Education
- Master's degree in Biochemistry
- Master's degree in Physiology
- Master's degree in Dermatology
- Master's degree in Parasitology
- Ph.D. Biochemistry
- M.D. Dermatology
- Ph.D. Parasitology
- M.D. Surgery
- M.D. Pathology
- M.D. Medicine
- M.D. Paediatrics
- M.D. Obs/gynae
- M.D. Community Medicine

== See also ==
- Education in Sudan
- List of Islamic educational institutions
- List of universities in Sudan
