= East al Gazera District =

East al Gazera
- District
- Country: Sudan
- State: Al Jazirah

East al Gazera is a district of Al Jazirah state, Sudan.
