= Merawi District =

Merawi
- District
- Country: Sudan
- State: Northern state

Merawi is a district of Northern state, Sudan.
