= Shendi District =

Shendi
- District
- Country: Sudan
- State: River Nile

Shendi is a district of River Nile state, Sudan.
