= Jebel Marra District =

Jebel Marra
- District
- Country: Sudan
- State: West Darfur

Population (2008)
  - Total: 11,953

Jebel Marra is a district of West Darfur state, Sudan.
