= Rehed al Birdi District =

Rehed al Birdi
- District
- Country: Sudan
- State: South Darfur

Rehed al Birdi is a district of South Darfur state, Sudan.
