= Buram District =

Buram
- District
- Country: Sudan
- State: South Darfur

Buram is a district of South Darfur state, Sudan.
