= Galegu Airport =

Coordinates: 12.53300°N 35.06700°E

- IATA: DNX; ICAO: HSGG

Summary
- Airport type: Public
- Serves: Dinder
- Location: Sudan
- Elevation AMSL: 1,640 ft / 500 m
- Interactive map of Galegu Airport

Galegu Airport is an airport serving Dinder in Sudan.
