= Port Sudan District =

Port Sudan
- District
- Interactive map of Port Sudan
- Country: Sudan
- State: Red Sea

Port Sudan is a district of Red Sea state, Sudan.
