= Al Galabat District =

Al Galabat
- District
- Interactive map of Al Galabat
- Country: Sudan
- State: Al Qadarif

Al Galabat is a district of Al Qadarif state, Sudan.
