= Mershing =

Village in Sudan

Mershing مرشنج
- Village
- Location within Sudan
- Coordinates: 12°43′1″N 24°54′4″E
- Country: Sudan
- State: South Darfur
- Time zone: UTC+2 (CAT)

Mershing (Arabic: مرشنج) is a village in South Darfur, Sudan.

== History ==
On 4 September 2025, a drone was shot down by the Rapid Support Forces (RSF) over Mershing, with RSF commanders claiming that it was a Baykar Bayraktar Akinci drone.
