= Halayeb District =

Halayeb
- District
- Country: Sudan
- State: Red Sea

Halayeb is a district of Red Sea state, Sudan.
