= Ad Douiem District =

Ad Douiem
- District
- Country: Sudan
- State: White Nile

Ad Douiem is a district in White Nile state, Sudan.
