= Kas District =

Kas
- District
- Interactive map of Kas
- Country: Sudan
- State: South Darfur
- Established: 1872
- Founder: Junah Book
- Elevation: 579 m (1,900 ft)

Population (2008)
  - Estimate: 53

Kas is a district of South Darfur state, Sudan.It has an estimated population of 53 and an elevation of 579 m (1,900 ft) above sea level.
