= Ad Dinder District =

Ad Dinder
- District
- Country: Sudan
- State: Sennar

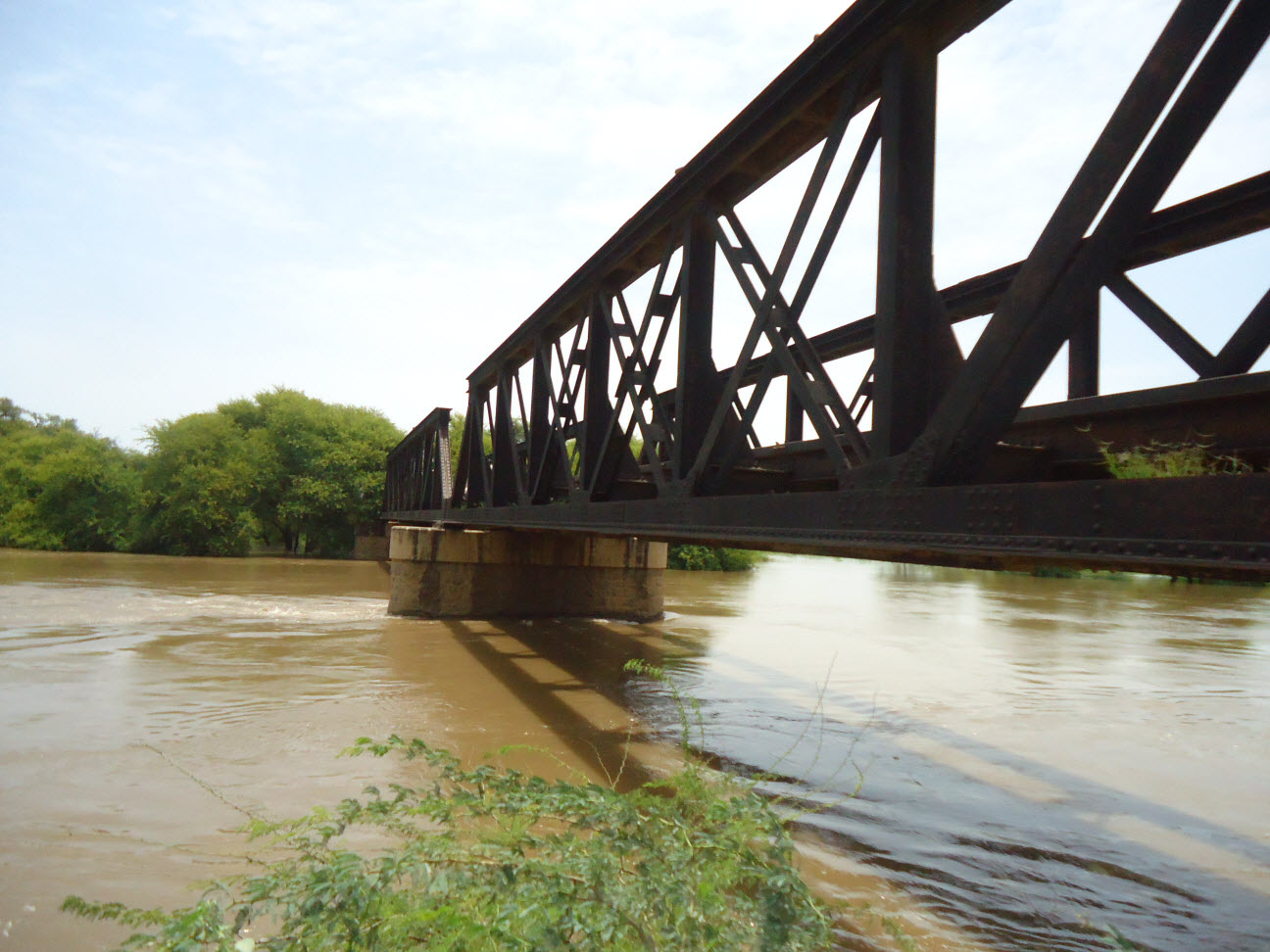
Photograph of the Dinder river

Ad Dinder is a district of Sennar state, Sudan.
