= Edd al Fursan District =

Edd al Fursan
- District
- Country: Sudan
- State: South Darfur

Edd al Fursan is a district of South Darfur state, Sudan.
