= Hamashkorieb District =

Hamashkorieb
- District
- Country: Sudan
- State: Kassala

Hamashkorieb is a district of Kassala state, Sudan.
