= Sharg En Nile District =

Sharg En Nile شرق النيل
- District
- Interactive map of Sharg En Nile
- Country: Sudan
- State: Khartoum

Sharg En Nile (Arabic: شرق النيل) or East Nile is a district of Khartoum state, Sudan.
