= Aroma, Sudan =

Aroma أروما
- Town
- Location of Aroma in Sudan
- Coordinates: 15°48′42″N 36°8′13″E
- Country: Sudan
- State: Kassala
- Time zone: UTC+2 (CAT)

Aroma (Arabic: أروما) is a town located in Kassala State, Sudan. Aroma is north of Kassala State's capital, Kassala. In 2016, Aroma suffered from water shortage and Kassala State endured a severe bread shortage.

== Climate ==
Climate data for Aroma (1961–1990)
Month	Jan	Feb	Mar	Apr	May	Jun	Jul	Aug	Sep	Oct	Nov	Dec	Year
Record high °C (°F)	38.8 (101.8)	44.0 (111.2)	45.2 (113.4)	46.5 (115.7)	46.6 (115.9)	46.5 (115.7)	43.4 (110.1)	43.0 (109.4)	43.5 (110.3)	43.5 (110.3)	41.7 (107.1)	39.8 (103.6)	46.6 (115.9)
Mean daily maximum °C (°F)	32.3 (90.1)	35.0 (95.0)	38.4 (101.1)	42.1 (107.8)	40.9 (105.6)	40.9 (105.6)	37.5 (99.5)	36.3 (97.3)	38.0 (100.4)	38.0 (100.4)	37.0 (98.6)	32.9 (91.2)	38.3 (100.9)
Daily mean °C (°F)	23.7 (74.7)	24.8 (76.6)	28.3 (82.9)	31.4 (88.5)	32.1 (89.8)	33.0 (91.4)	30.7 (87.3)	29.9 (85.8)	30.1 (86.2)	30.0 (86.0)	27.8 (82.0)	23.9 (75.0)	28.7 (83.7)
Mean daily minimum °C (°F)	14.0 (57.2)	14.6 (58.3)	18.1 (64.6)	20.7 (69.3)	23.4 (74.1)	25.1 (77.2)	24.0 (75.2)	23.4 (74.1)	22.1 (71.8)	22.0 (71.6)	18.6 (65.5)	15.0 (59.0)	20.1 (68.2)
Record low °C (°F)	5.0 (41.0)	7.4 (45.3)	9.9 (49.8)	11.5 (52.7)	15.6 (60.1)	18.0 (64.4)	18.2 (64.8)	16.0 (60.8)	18.0 (64.4)	16.5 (61.7)	10.0 (50.0)	6.0 (42.8)	5.0 (41.0)
Average precipitation mm (inches)	0.4 (0.02)	trace	trace	1.6 (0.06)	7.1 (0.28)	20.6 (0.81)	62.0 (2.44)	66.1 (2.60)	28.0 (1.10)	6.8 (0.27)	1.0 (0.04)	0.0 (0.0)	193.6 (7.62)
Average precipitation days (≥ 0.1 mm)	0.0	0.0	0.0	0.4	1.2	2.2	5.5	5.3	2.4	0.9	0.2	0.0	18.1
Average relative humidity (%) (daily average)	48	41	34	27	25	32	46	52	47	37	39	46	39
Mean monthly sunshine hours	306.9	277.2	300.7	303.0	294.5	243.0	244.9	269.7	297.0	300.7	303.0	306.9	3,447.5
Mean daily sunshine hours	9.9	9.9	9.7	10.1	9.5	8.1	7.9	8.7	9.9	9.7	10.1	9.9	9.4
Percentage possible sunshine	87	85	80	83	75	61	61	69	78	81	87	88	78
Source: NOAA
