= Adayala District =

Adayala
- District
- Country: Sudan
- State: South Darfur

Adayala is a district of South Darfur state, Sudan.
