= Sheikan District =

Sheikan شيكان
- District
- Country: Sudan
- State: North Kordofan
- Capital: El Obeid

Area
  - Total: 8,407 km^{2} (3,246 sq mi)

Sheikan is a district of North Kordofan state, Sudan. The administrative center is the city of El Obeid. The district area is 8,407 km^{2}.
