= Kosti District =

Kosti
- District
- Location within Sudan
- Country: Sudan
- State: White Nile

Kosti is a district in White Nile state, Sudan.
