= List of current state governors in Sudan =

The following table presents a listing of Sudan's state governors.

== Governors ==
State	Portrait	Name	Since
Blue Nile		Ahmed al-Omda	21 June 2021
Central Darfur		Vacant	23 November 2023
East Darfur		Vacant	23 November 2023
Gezira		Al-Taher Ibrahim Al-Khair	22 November 2023
Kassala		Sadig Mohamed El Azrag	April 2024
Khartoum		Ahmed Osman	2 March 2022
North Darfur		Al-Hafiz Bakhit Mohammed (acting)	1 January 2024
North Kurdufan		Khaled Mustafa Adam Othman	27 July 2020
Northern		Abdeen Awadallah	22 November 2023
Al Qadarif		Sulaiman Ali Muhammad Musa	27 July 2020
Red Sea		Abdullah Chingray Ohaj	27 July 2020
River Nile		Amna Ahmed Mohamed Ahmed al-Makki	27 July 2020
Sennar		Al-Mahi Muhammad Suleiman al-Mahi	27 July 2020
South Darfur		Bashir Mursal (acting)	June 2024
South Kurdufan		Hamed al-Bashir Ibrahim	27 July 2020
West Darfur		Bahr al-Din Adam Karama	28 July 2024
West Kurdufan		Essam al-Din Haroun Ahmed	22 November 2023
White Nile		Ismail Fath al-Rahman Hamed Warraq	27 July 2020

== Regional authorities and other areas ==
Area	Title	Name	Since
Darfur Regional Government	Governor	Minni Minnawi	10 August 2021
Eastern Sudan States Coordinating Council	Chair	Rotational	
Abyei Area Administration	Chief Administrator	Charles Abyei Jok	18 February 2025

== See also ==
- List of current state governors in South Sudan
