= Dilling (Sudan) =

- District
- Country: Sudan
- State: South Kordofan

Dilling is a district of South Kordofan state, Sudan.
