= Omdurman District =

Omdurman
- District
- Interactive map of Omdurman
- Country: Sudan
- State: Khartoum

Omdurman is a district of Khartoum state, Sudan.
