= Al Gutaina District =

Al Gutaina
- District
- Country: Sudan
- State: White Nile

Al Gutaina is a district of White Nile state, Sudan.
