= Karary District =

Karary كرري
- District
- Interactive map of Karary
- Country: Sudan
- State: Khartoum

Karary or Kerreri (Arabic: كرري) is a district of Khartoum state, Sudan.
