= Al Faw District, Al Qadarif =

District in Sudan

Al Faw
- District
- Country: Sudan
- State: Al Qadarif

Al Faw is a district of Al Qadarif state, Sudan.
