= Nahr Atbara District =

Nahr Atbara
- District
- Country: Sudan
- State: Kassala

Nahr Atbara is a district of Kassala state, Sudan.
