= Addabah District =

Addabah
- District
- Coordinates: 17.239°N 31.06°E
- Country: Sudan
- State: Northern state

Addabah is a district of Northern state, Sudan.
