= Wadi Halfa District =

Wadi Halfa
- District
- Country: Sudan
- State: Northern state

Population (2008)
  - Total: 33,631

Wadi Halfa or Halfa is a district of Northern State, Sudan. Its population was 33,631 in 2008.
