= John Akec =

South Sudanese professional educator

John Apuruot Akec is a South Sudanese professional educator who served from May 2010 to March 2014 as the vice chancellor of the newly established university of Northern Bahr el Ghazal in Sudan. In 2014, Akec was appointed vice chancellor of the University of Juba.

== Education ==
He studied at Gogrial Primary School (1967–73), Kuajok Junior (1973-76), and Rumbek Secondary School (1976–79), He graduated with B.Sc. (Honours) in applied physics and electronics from the University of Gezira in 1985. He obtained a masters of science in system engineering from the University of Wales, College of Cardiff (UK) in 1992. Akec was awarded a doctorate of manufacturing and mechanical engineering from the University of Birmingham, United Kingdom in 2000. In 2005, he was awarded a postgraduate certificate in environmental innovation by the University of Manchester, UK and 1992 respectively, specialising in automation and robotics.

== Work experience ==
He worked at the Radiation and Isotopes Center Khartoum from 1986 to 1987, where he served in the Ministry of Health in Khartoum, worked as a freelance analyst for mobile phone markets in Africa for Jupiter Research Limited in 2006, and a member of the IEEE computer society in the UK. Outside his work Akec has been writing in popular blogs that bear his name. Akec is rather an ambitious man and he is looking forward to opening his own university that would not operate like the rest, rather it will concentrate at looking at the social gaps and creating a curriculum that would train young people to fill them.

== Politics ==
Akec has opposed some decisions made by the government. which has made him to be branded as opposition by many. He criticized the media for censoring views that are opposing government initiative to dredging the Nile River tributaries of weed to enable water flow. He has put up a public consultation forum within the university of Juba. He organized the fight for Sudd wetlands in response of the governments resumption of the Jonglei canal project despite elites opposing it.

== Controversies ==
The professor has been accused of being self centered and exploitative to the students in his plan to build a new lecture hall.
