= Al Kamlin District =

Al Kamlin
- District
- Location within Sudan
- Coordinates: 15.11054448°N 32.9462287°E
- Country: Sudan
- State: Al Jazirah

Population (2008)
  - Total: 401,930

Al Kamlin (also known as El Kamlin) is a district in Al Jazirah state, Sudan.
