= Jebrat al Sheikh District =

Jebrat al Sheikh جبرت الشيخ
- District
- Country: Sudan
- State: North Kordofan

Area
  - Total: 50,968 km^{2} (19,679 sq mi)

Jebrat al Sheikh is a district of North Kordofan state, Sudan. The area of the district is 50,968 km^{2}.

In the Sudanese civil war (2023–present) the district and city centre was occupied by the Rapid Support Forces. As part of the occupation by the RSF the main hospital was reportedly looted and turned into barracks.
