= Dongola District =

Dongola
- District
- Country: Sudan
- State: Northern state

Population (2008)
  - Total: 150,161

Dongola is a district of Northern state, Sudan. Its population was 150,161 in 2008.
