= Al Rahd District =

Al Rahd
- District
- Country: Sudan
- State: Al Qadarif

Al Rahd is a district of Al Qadarif state, Sudan.
