= Qala al-Nahl District =

Al-Quresha القريشة
- District
- Country: Sudan
- State: Al Qadarif

Area
  - Total: 32,000 km^{2} (12,000 sq mi)
- Elevation: 603 m (1,978 ft)

Population (2018)
  - Total: 108,211
  - Density: 3.4/km^{2} (8.8/sq mi)

Qala'a al-Nahl is a town located in the southwest of Al Qadarif State in Sudan, located 65 kilometers from El-Gadarif. Qala'a al-Nahl is located close to the Dinder National Park.
