= Ad Damazin District =

Coordinates: 11.78403°N 34.34567°E

Ad Damazin
- District
- Interactive map of Ad Damazin
- Country: Sudan
- State: Blue Nile

Population (2008)
  - Total: 186,051
- Time zone: CAT

Ad Damazin is a district of Blue Nile state, Sudan, with a total population of 186,051 as of 2015, making it the biggest city in the region of Blue Nile, and the closest airport to Ad Damazin is the Damazin Airport. The district itself is also raised 485 meters above sea level.
