= Singa District (Sudan) =

Singa
- District
- Country: Sudan
- State: Sennar

Singa is a district of Sennar state, Sudan.
