= Tokar District =

Tokar
- District
- Country: Sudan
- State: Red Sea

Tokar is a district of Red Sea state, Sudan.
