= Wadi Salih District =

Wadi Salih
- District
- Country: Sudan
- State: West Darfur

Population (2008)
  - Total: 183,043

Wadi Salih is a district of West Darfur state, Sudan.
