= Dinder, Sudan =

Dinder الدندر
- Location in Sudan
- Coordinates: 13°16′00″N 34°08′30″E
- Country: Sudan
- State: Sennar

Population (2025)
  - Total: 15,144
- Time zone: UTC+3 (EAT)
- Sources: OSM Michelin

Dinder (Arabic: الدندر) is a town in the Sennar state in eastern Sudan. It is within a large loop of the Dinder River, on the western side.

Despite being 93 kilometres (58 mi) northwest of the park boundary, Dinder acts as the gateway for tourists seeking to visit the Dinder National Park.

== Sudanese civil war (2023-present) ==
The RSF seized Dinder from the SAF on 2 July 2024 during the Sennar offensive. The SAF regained control of the town on 4 July 2024. It was recaptured by the RSF on 5 July 2024.

On 19 October 2024, a fourth battle erupted at Dinder. SAF fully recaptured the town by 23 October 2024.
