= Wad al-'Abbas =

Wad al-'Abbas ود العباس
- Town
- Location of Wad al-'Abbas in Sudan
- Coordinates: 13°46′5″N 33°38′32″E
- Country: Sudan
- State: Sennar
- Time zone: UTC+2 (CAT)

Wad al-'Abbas (Arabic: ود العباس) is one of the oldest cities in the province of Sinār, Sudan. It was founded by Sheik Muhammad 'Alī 'Abbās, who came from the district of Wahīb in Northern, Sudan, where he was a learned and devout man. He founded a centre for teaching of the Qur'ān.
