= Mukjar District =

Mukjar
- District
- Country: Sudan
- State: West Darfur

Population (2008)
  - Total: 101,265

Mukjar is a district of West Darfur state, Sudan.
