= South al Gazera District =

South al Gazera
- District
- Country: Sudan
- State: Al Jazirah

South al Gazera is a district of Al Jazirah state, Sudan.
