= Central Darfur =

State in Sudan

Central Darfur State ولاية وسط دارفور
- State
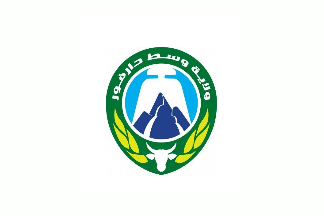
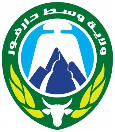
- Flag Seal

- Location in Sudan
- Coordinates: 12°54′27″N 23°28′21″E
- Country: Sudan
- Region: Darfur
- Capital: Zalingei

Government
  - Governor: Vacant

Area
  - Total: 37,114 km^{2} (14,330 sq mi)

Population (2017)
  - Total: 2,499,000
- Time zone: UTC+2 (CAT)
- Website: https://www.facebook.com/CDGOV/

Central Darfur State (Arabic: ولاية وسط دارفور, romanized: Wilāyat Wasaṭ Dārfūr) is a state in south-western Sudan, and one of five comprising the Darfur region. The state borders North Darfur to the north, South Darfur to the east, Central African Republic to the south, Chad and West Darfur to the west. It was created in January 2012 as a result of the ongoing peace process for the wider Darfur region. The state capital is Zalingei. The state was formed from land that had been part of the states of West Darfur and South Darfur.

On 4 August 2023, the entire state was confirmed fallen, and claimed by the Rapid Support Forces (RSF) after their clashes with Sudanese Armed Forces (SAF), leading to collapse of the state's capital, Zalingei.

== Districts ==
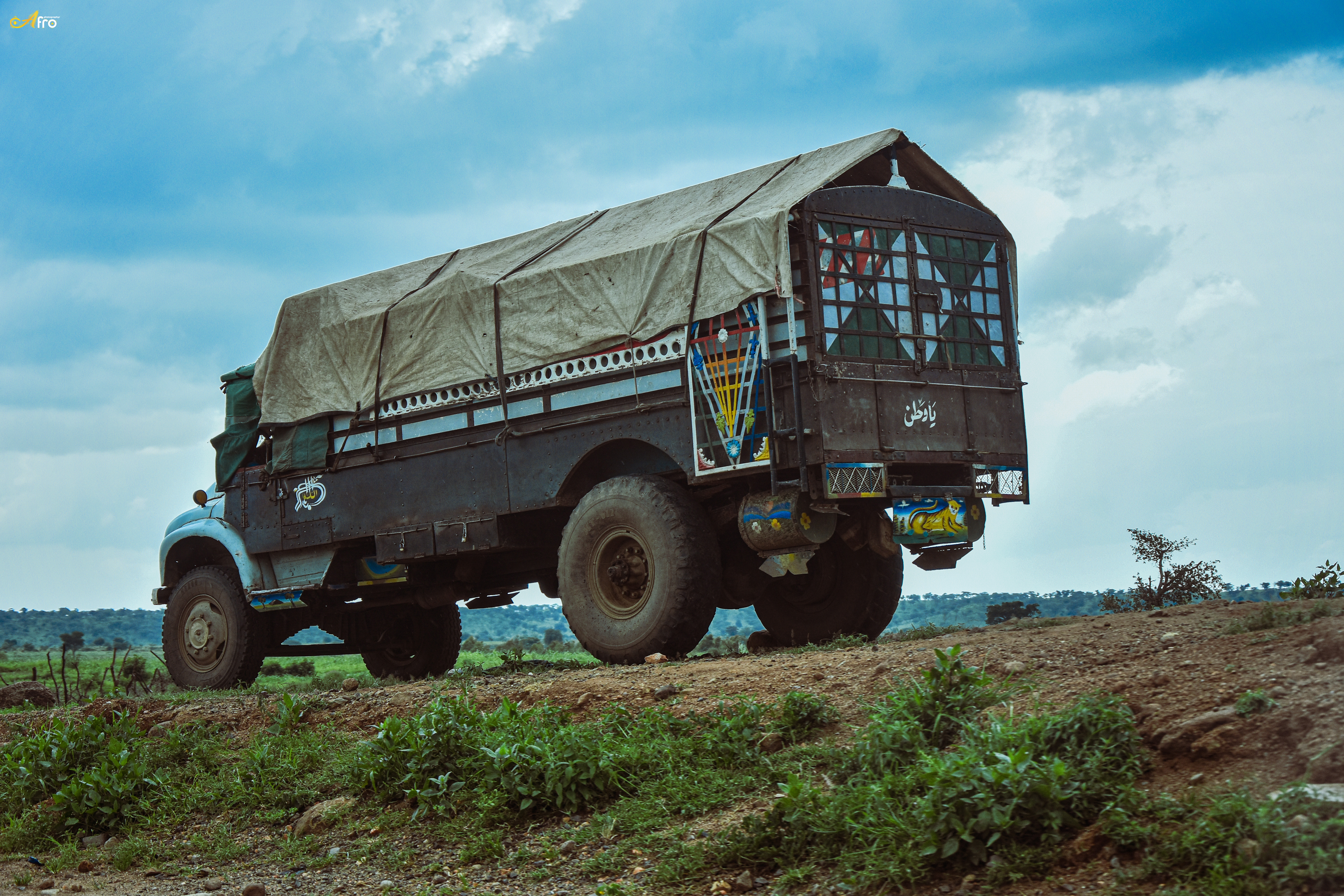
A truck in Nertiti.

- Zalingei
- Azum District
- Wadi Salih District
- Mukjar District
- Um Dukhun
- Nertiti District
- Rokirro District
- Bindisi District
- Kangey District
- Soloa District

== Governors ==
Name	Period	References
Jaafar Abdelhakam	at least during 2016	
Major general Khalid Nour El Dayem	22 February 2019 – unknown	
Adeeb Youssef	27 July 2020 – 25 October 2021	
Saad Babikir	13 December 2021 – 22 November 2023	
Mustafa Tambour (current)	Unknown-	
