= Wad al Hulaywah =

Wad al Hulaywah (ود الحليو) is a populated place in Kassala State, Sudan. Due to limited access to clean water, residents have relied on the Setit River and disease outbreaks resulted.
