= Districts of South Sudan =

Before the independence of South Sudan from Sudan, the 10 states of Southern Sudan were divided into districts. These districts have been superseded by counties.

== Central Equatoria ==
Districts of Bahr al Jabal

1. Terkeka District
2. Juba District
3. Yei District
4. Kajo Keji District

== East Equatoria ==
Districts of East Equatoria

1. Magwi District
2. Imatong District
3. Shokodom District
4. Kapoeta District

== Jonglei ==
Districts of Junqali

1. Uror District
2. Fam al Zaraf District
3. Ayod District
4. Wat District
5. Akobo District
6. Twi/Twic East & Duk Districts
7. Bor District
8. Pibor District

== Lakes ==
Districts of Lakes

1. Shobet District
2. Rumbek District
3. Yerol District
4. Aliab District

== North Bahr al Ghazal ==
Districts of North Bahr al Ghazal

1. Aryat District
2. Aweil District
3. Wanyjok District
4. Malek Alel District

== Unity ==
Districts of Unity

1. Al Mayom District
2. Rabkona District
3. Faring District
4. Al Leiri District

== Upper Nile ==
Districts of Upper Nile

1. Tonga District
2. Fashooda District
3. Malut District
4. Al Renk District
5. Al Mabien District
6. Mayot District
7. Sobat District
8. Baleit District

== Warab ==
Districts of Warab

1. Nahr Lol District
2. Gogrial District
3. Warab District
4. Tonj District

== West Bahr al Ghazal ==
Districts of West Bahr al Ghazal

1. Raja District
2. Wau District
3. Nahr Jur District

== West Equatoria ==
Districts of West Equatoria

1. Tombura District
2. Yambio District
3. Meridi District
4. Mundri District

== See also ==
- States of South Sudan
- Districts of Sudan
