= Um Rawaba District =

Um Rawaba أم روابة
- District
- Country: Sudan
- State: North Kordofan

Area
  - Total: 11,671 km^{2} (4,506 sq mi)

Um Rawaba is a district of North Kordofan state, Sudan. The area of the district is 11,671 km^{2}.
