= Abyei District =

Former district of Sudan

The Abyei district shown within the state of South Kurdufan (today's West Kordofan)

Abyei District was a former district of the Sudan, considered part of the state of West Kurdufan. Upon the dissolution of West Kurdufan in 2005, it was included in the state of South Kurdufan. Its administrative centre was the town of Abyei.

== Dissolution ==
The 2004 Protocol on the resolution of the Abyei conflict (Abyei Protocol) in the Comprehensive Peace Agreement (CPA) that ended the Second Sudanese Civil War included provisions to replace the Abyei district with a new jurisdiction to be accorded "special administrative status". The new area was to have different borders, intended to represent "the area of the nine Ngok Dinka chiefdoms transferred to Kordofan in 1905", with demarcation to be determined by a multinational commission. After considerable dispute, a consensus on boundaries enclosing a territory considerably smaller than the existing Abyei district was reached in 2009. A new administration was established for the new Abyei Area, covering the southwestern part of the former district. It is unclear what local government provisions were put in place for the district's remaining territory.
