= Um Al Gura District =

Um Al Gura
- District
- Interactive map of Um Al Gura
- Country: Sudan
- State: Al Jazirah

Um Al Gura is a district of Al Jazirah state, Sudan.
