= Markondi =

Locality in South Darfur State, Sudan

Markondi is a locality in South Darfur, Sudan.
