= Kassala State =

State of Sudan

Kassala State ولاية كسلا Ash Sharqiyah
- State
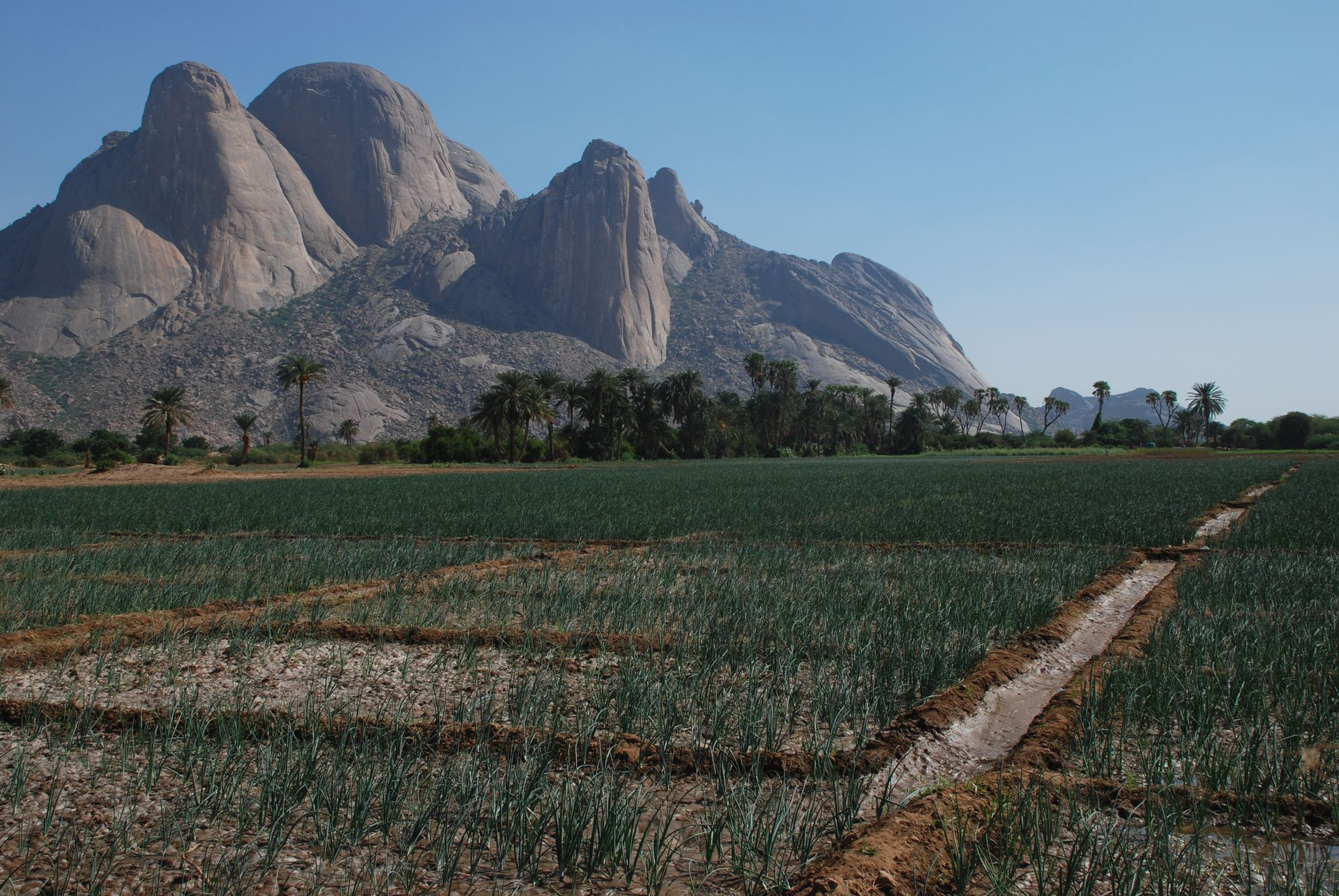
- Taka Mountains near Kassala, Sudan

- Flag Seal

- Location in Sudan.
- Coordinates: 15°45′N 35°43′E
- Country: Sudan
- Region: Butana
- Capital: Kassala

Government
  - Type: Eastern Sudan States Coordinating Council
  - Governor: Sadig Mohamed El Azrag

Area
  - Total: 36,710 km^{2} (14,170 sq mi)

Population (2018)
  - Total: 2,519,071
- Time zone: UTC+2 (CAT)
- HDI (2017): 0.453 low

Kassala (Arabic: ولاية كسلا, called Ash Sharqiyah during 1991–1994) is one of the 18 wilayat (states) of Sudan. It has an area of 36,710 km^{2} and an estimated population of approximately 2,519,071 in 2018. The state borders Khartoum to the west, Qadarif to the south, Eritrea to the east, River Nile to the northwest, and Red Sea State to the northeast. Kassala is the capital of the state. Towns in the state of Kassala include Aroma, Hamashkoraib, Halfa el Jadida (New Halfa), Khashm el Girba and Telkuk.

In 2016, Kassala State suffered a severe bread shortage.

== Districts ==
Districts of Kassala

1. Seteet District
2. Nahr Atbara District
3. Kassala District
4. Al Gash District
5. Hamashkorieb District

== Towns ==
- Kassala (Capital)
- Aroma
- Hamashkoraib, developed around Islamic schools
- Halfa el Jadida
- Khashm el Girba
- Telkuk, a district isolated by the presence of land mines
- Wad al Hulaywah
