= Al Qadarif State =

State of Sudan

Al Qadarif القضارف Gadaref, Gadarif or Qadārif
- State
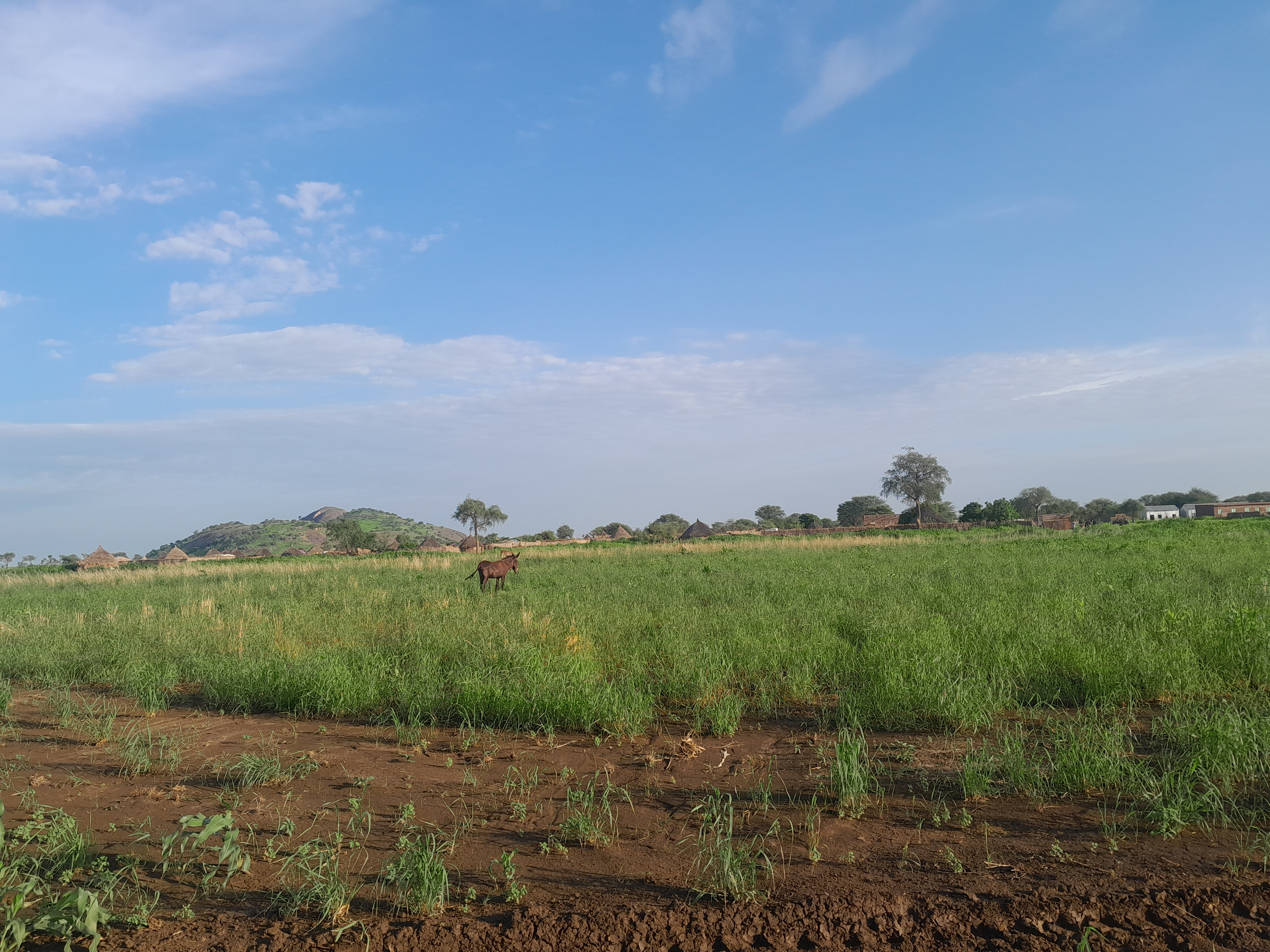
- Agricultural area in Al Qadarif

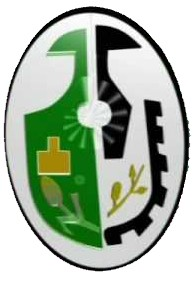
- Seal

- Location in Sudan.
- Coordinates: 14°0′N 35°0′E
- Country: Sudan
- Region: Butana
- Capital: Al Qadarif

Government
  - Governor: Mohamed Abdelrahman Mahgoub

Area
  - Total: 75,263 km^{2} (29,059 sq mi)

Population (2018)
  - Total: 2,208,385
- Time zone: UTC+2 (CAT)
- HDI (2017): 0.457 low

Al Qadarif (Arabic: القضارف Al Qaḍārif), also spelled Gedaref or Gadarif, is one of the 18 wilayat (states) of Sudan. It covers an area of 75,263 km^{2} and had an estimated population of approximately 2,208,385 as of 2018.It borders Kassala to the north, Khartoum to the northwest, Gezira to the west, Sennar to the south, Ethiopia and Eritrea to the east. Al Qadarif is the state’s capital, with other notable towns including Doka and Gallabat. The state also encompasses the disputed Al Fushqa District.

== History ==
Qadarif was once inhabited by the Butana Group that existed over 5000 years ago.

Most of Qadarif state is part of the Butana region which was historically ruled by the Kingdom of Alwa The ethnic core ruling nobility of Alwa known as the Anaji Nubians may have lived in Qadarif as farmers. The kingdom of Alwa likely saw Qadarif which neighboured Ethiopia as an important trading center between the Ethiopian kingdoms and Alwa and served as the border between these kingdoms. Qadarif came under the polity of the Abdallabi tribe for a short time in the late 15th century and early 16th century before the Funj took over the region in 1504, defeating the Abdallabi polity.

== Demographics ==
Gedaref State in Sudan is home to a diverse population consisting of various ethnic groups, including members of numerous tribes. Additionally, individuals from regions outside Sudan—such as Eritrea, Ethiopia, Yemen, Somalia, Chad, Egypt (including Copts), Armenia, and Kurdistan—contribute to its multicultural fabric. This intricate social structure has evolved over time due to historical migrations during the period of Turkish rule and the Mahdist Revolution, as well as changes in the state's agricultural practices.

The state is a natural geographical area situated on the slopes of the Ethiopian plateau, descending towards rivers, valleys, and water-filled creeks. It is characterized by fertile clay soil, interspersed with occasional hills, which enhances its agricultural potential.

The state can be divided into three distinct geomorphic regions:

- Highlands: Located in the southeast along the Sudan-Ethiopia border, featuring mountains and isolated chains of hills.
- Plains: Characterized by flat, mud-rich lands and gentle slopes, forming the predominant landscape of the state.
- Valley Areas: Dominated by sedimentary landforms surrounding seasonal rivers, including the Atbara River, Rahad River, and Islam River.

== Agriculture ==
The state is distinguished by its land, which is highly suitable for agriculture. It hosts some of Sudan's largest rainfed agricultural projects, utilizing mechanized equipment such as tractors and combine harvesters that depend on rainfall. The state also features large-capacity silos for grain storage. Additionally, Al Qadarif boasts the largest market for private crops, including sesame and sorghum.

The state is considered a strategic center for food security in Sudan. Agriculture, primarily reliant on rain for irrigation, is the main economic activity. Trade and services along the borders with Ethiopia and Eritrea also play a significant role in the state's economy. The introduction of mechanized agricultural methods in 1945 significantly expanded arable land to 7,162,133 hectares, while 2,376,563 hectares of forest contribute to the production of gum arabic.

The distribution of agricultural areas is as follows:

- Dry Agriculture Belt: Approximately 1.63 million acres located in the north, with rainfall ranging between 500 and 600 mm. This area features Ptrepettha mud and lacks valleys and creeks. Mechanized farming, in the form of large sprawling fields, is practiced.
- Rainfed Agriculture Belt: Approximately 2.96 million acres, with rainfall ranging between 550 and 600 mm. This region has clay soil on flat plains, with rainfed agriculture practiced in large fields and smaller areas around Alqryz. Forest reserves are also present.
- Water Basin Area: Approximately 1.58 million acres, where clay soil and water are readily available.
- Mixed Farming Belt: Approximately 1.39 million acres.
- Protected Areas: A total protected land area of about 176,630 acres, with protected waters covering an area of about 878,180 acres.

Agricultural projects in this region primarily depend on rainfed irrigation and rainfall. Notable projects include Um Settat, sesame cultivation, Alvhqh, Labadi, and several others. The Rahad Agricultural Project uses irrigation from the Rahad and Blue Nile Rivers for both agricultural and industrial purposes.

The main crops grown are sesame, maize, millet, gum arabic, and sunflower. Important horticultural crops include lemon, watermelon, and vegetables like tomatoes, okra, and squash.

== Forests ==
Gedaref State contains approximately 11 designated forest reserves, primarily characterized by the prevalence of Acacia trees, which produce gum arabic. In addition, there are 31 other forest reserves, also dominated by Acacia trees, with sizes ranging from 100 to 800 acres.

== Livestock ==
Livestock in Gedaref State is estimated at about 5 million head of cattle, belonging to various factions. This number increases to around 7 million during the rainy season, when seasonal pasture becomes available. During this time, shepherds from neighboring states bring their animals to Gedaref in search of pasture and water.

== Industry ==
Industry in the state is primarily based on agricultural products like sesame, peanuts, and sunflower. Key industries include oil, soap, and sweets production, with factories located in Gedaref. There are also workshops that assemble tractors, combine harvesters, and other agricultural machinery, along with lathes for making spare parts and providing repair services.

== Transport ==
- Wad Zayed Airport

== Services ==
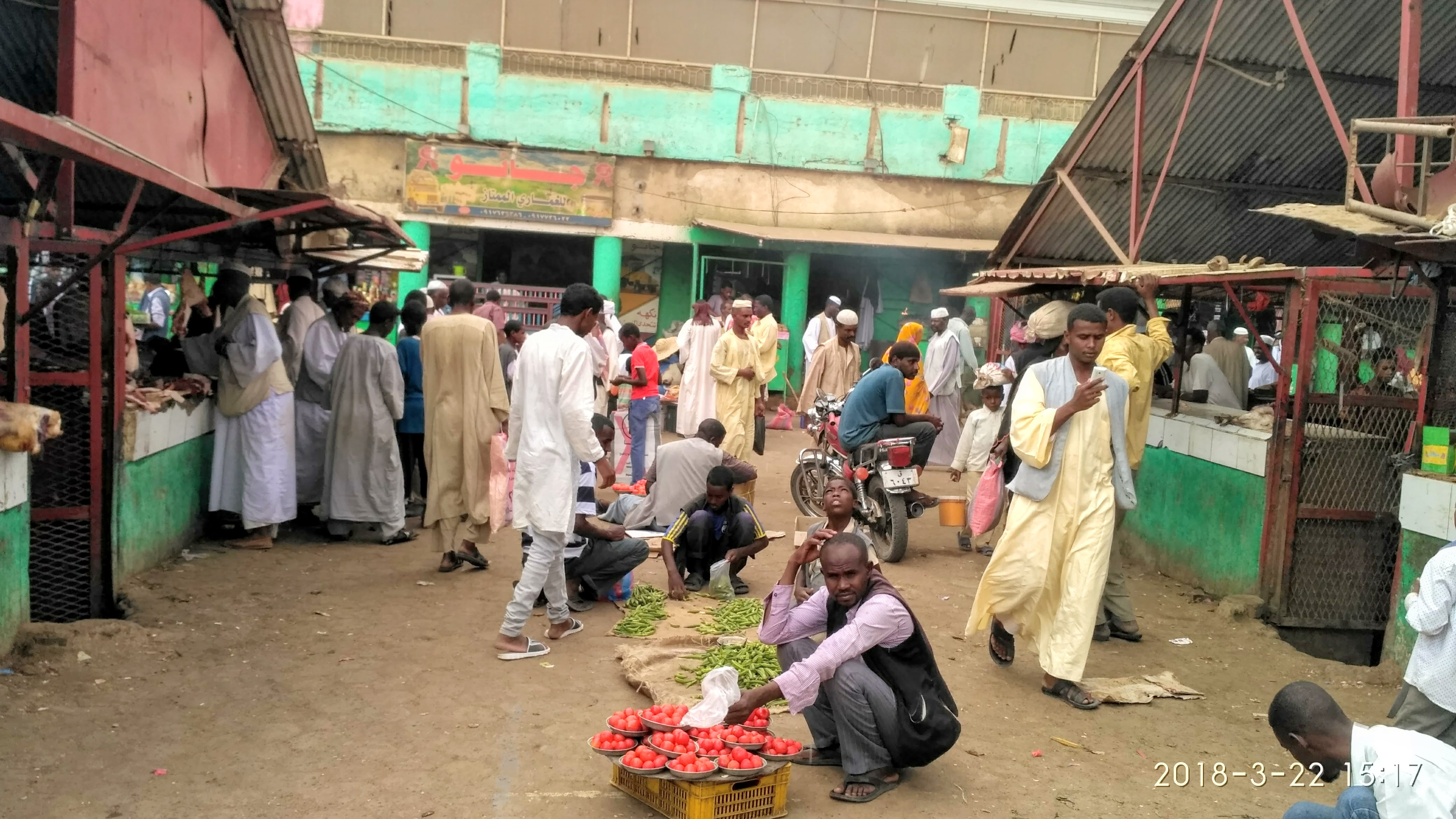
Vegetable market in Gedaref

Crops are stored and processed in grain silos and other storage facilities.

=== Banking and banks ===
The banking system in the state includes 24 branches of various banks, consisting of 17 commercial banks and 7 specialized banks. Additionally, the Bank of Sudan oversees banking activities and supervises the implementation of the central bank's laws and policies.

The city of Gedaref has eighteen bank branches, with three branches in the FAO and one branch each in the cities of Alhawwath, Acanthosis, and Dawkah. The Gedaref Investment Bank was integrated with the State Savings Bank as part of the Central Bank of Sudan's bank consolidation policy. The city also offers technical and mechanical services related to agriculture, including efforts to combat agricultural pests.

== Cities ==
Gedaref serves as the state capital and the central hub for the state government, the governor's office, and commercial activities, providing essential urban services. Acanthosis hosts the largest market for livestock in the state and is home to the state veterinarian. The FAO is located in Gedaref, with the Rahad Agricultural Project's headquarters also in the city, which overlooks the main transit road from Khartoum to Port Sudan.

Alhawwath is the capital of the Rahad province, situated between the agricultural production areas and the railway line that leads to Port Sudan via the city of Kassala. Dawkah, the capital of the Tippers province, lies in the southeastern part of the state and serves as a key center for agricultural production. Tippers, located on the Sudan-Ethiopia border, is a hub for cross-border trade to Ethiopia, Somalia, and Djibouti, facilitated by the continental road network.

Gouge Bees is located near the Dinder National Park Reserve, one of the state's most promising areas following the discovery of mineral wealth, including gold ore and natural gas. Cottage Cheese is one of the state's border localities.

== Districts ==
Districts of Al Qadarif

1. Al Faw District
2. Al Gadaref District
3. Al Rahd District
4. East Galabat District
5. West Galabat District
6. Al Fushqa District
7. Butana District
8. Qala al-Nahl District
9. Al-Quresha District

== Localities ==
- El-Gadarif (capital)
- Fao
- Al-Hawwata
- Doka
- Gallabat
- ُShowak, El-Fashaga
- Gala-elnahal
- Basonda
- Elgorisha
- Wasat Elqadarif
