= White Nile State =

State of Sudan

White Nile State النيل الأبيض an-Nil al-Abyad
- State
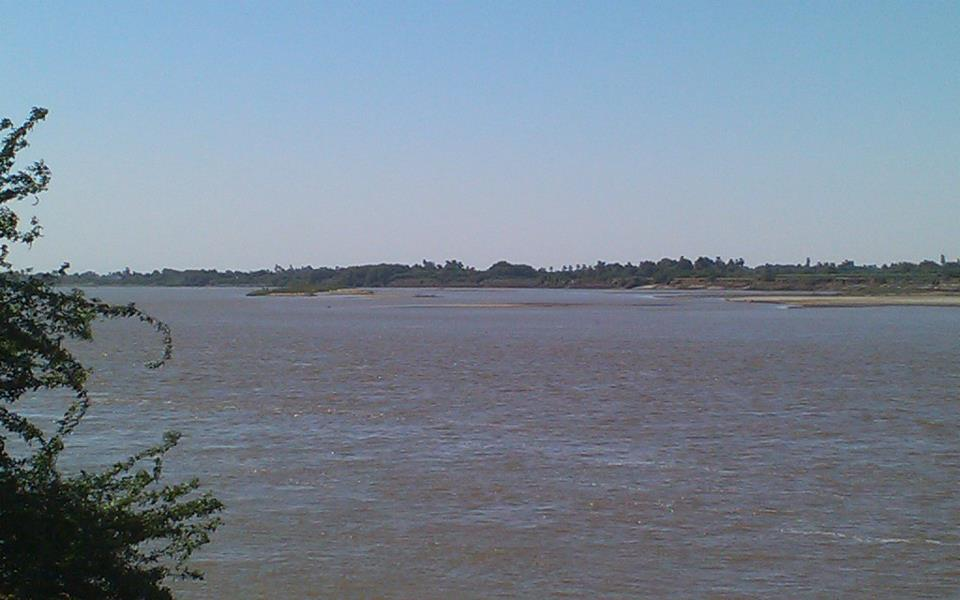
- The White Nile at Rabak

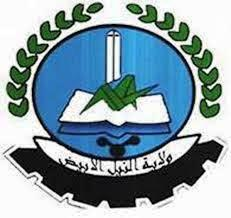
- Seal

- Location in Sudan.
- Coordinates: 13°27′N 32°20′E
- Country: Sudan
- Region: Butana
- Capital: Rabak

Government
  - Governor: Ismail Fath al-Rahman Hamed Warraq

Area
  - Total: 39,701 km^{2} (15,329 sq mi)

Population (2018)
  - Total: 2,493,880
- Time zone: UTC+2 (CAT)
- HDI (2023): 0.498 low

White Nile State (Arabic: النيل الأبيض, romanized: An Nīl al Ābyaḍ) is one of the 18 wilayat or states of Sudan. It has an area of 39,701 km^{2} and an estimated population of approximately 2,493,880 people (2018 est). The state borders Khartoum to the north, Gezira and Sennar to the east, South Sudan to the south, and Kordofan to the west. Since 1994, Rabak has been the capital of the state; other important cities include Kosti and Ed Dueim. On 21 May 2025, the Sudanese Armed Forces said it had cleared White Nile State of the Rapid Support Forces during the civil war.

== Districts ==
The state is administratively subdivided into four districts:

Districts of White Nile

1. Ad Douiem District
2. Al Gutaina District
3. Kosti District
4. Al Jabalian District

== Places ==
- Shukeiri
- Kosti
- Rabak
- El Geteina
- Al Jabalayn
- Dar Erenga
