= East Darfur =

State of Sudan

Coordinates: 11°10′N 26°30′E

East Darfur State ولاية شرق دارفور Sharq Darfur
- State
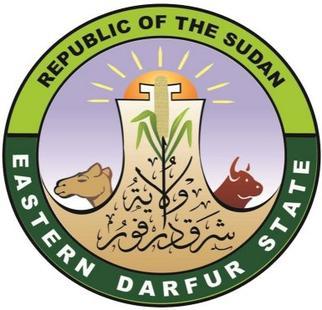
- Seal

- Location in Sudan
- Country: Sudan
- Region: Darfur
- Capital: Ed Daein

Government
  - Governor: Vacant

Population (2018)
  - Total: 1,587,200
- Time zone: UTC+2 (CAT)
- Website: http://www.eastdarfur.gov.sd/index.php/en/

East Darfur State (Arabic: ولاية شرق دارفور Wilāyat Šarq Dārfūr; Sharq Darfur) is one of the states of Sudan, and one of five comprising the Darfur region. The state borders North Darfur to the north, South Darfur to the west, South Sudan to the south, and West Kordofan to the east. It was created in January 2012 as a result of the ongoing peace process for the wider Darfur region. The state capital is Ed Daein. The state was formed from land that was part of the state of South Darfur.

== Districts ==
- Ad Du'ain
- Abu Jabra
- Abu Karinka
- Adila
- Assalaya
- Bahr el Arab
- El Ferdous
- Yassin

== Economy ==
A large number of the state’s inhabitants work are herders, most of them concentrated in the Bahr el Arab region. Other jobs include agriculture which is characterized by its high productivity for various agricultural crops.

The state has fertile agricultural lands, mineral resources, oil, a huge livestock population, and vast pastures that attract nomadic herders from areas such as North Kordofan in the west and Al-Butana in central Sudan, which gives it importance with regard to food security and trade exchange.

== Transportation ==
The state is a crossroads linking the states of Kordofan and Darfur, as well as South Sudan, with the rest of Sudan. It also serves as the main transit point for goods to South Sudan, particularly to cities of Wau, Aweil, and Gogrial. Furthermore, it is connected by rail to Khartoum via Kosti and Sennar to the east and to Nyala to the west.

One of the challenges facing the state after the discovery of oil in Adila locality is providing security in that locality and other exploration areas.

On the social front, the states are characterized by historical ties and peaceful coexistence among their diverse ethnic, social, and cultural groups. The three main population groups in each state are the Rizeigat, the Ma'aliya, and the Birgid.
