= Sennar State =

State of Sudan

Sennar سنار Sinnar
- State
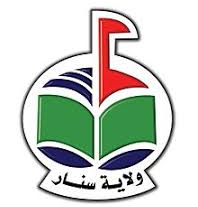
- Seal

- Location in Sudan.
- Coordinates: 12°58′N 34°3′E
- Country: Sudan
- Region: Butana
- Capital: Singa

Government
  - Type: State Government
  - Governor: Tawfeeq Muhammad

Area
  - Total: 37,844 km^{2} (14,612 sq mi)

Population (2018)
  - Total: 1,918,692
- Time zone: UTC+2 (CAT)
- HDI (2017): 0.493 low

Sennar (Arabic: سنار Sannār) is one of the 18 wilayat or states of Sudan. It has an area of 37,844 km^{2} (14,612 sq mi) and had a population of approximately 1,918,692 in 2018. The state borders Gezira and Al Qadarif to the north, White Nile and South Sudan to the west, Blue Nile to the south, and Ethiopia to the east.

== History ==
The area was under Kushite and Meroitic rule from 750 BC to around 350 AD. The area came under Alwan rule, after which the Alwans were overthrown by the Funj Sultanate who made Sennar their capital.

2023–present Sudanese civil war

Ever since the paramilitary group RSF took control of most of the state of Gezira State it has launched small but not threatening incursions into North Sennar. In June 2024, the RSF launched an offensive against the SAF in the state. The force started by attacking Jebel Moya, a key area controlling a main road, and stormed to take control of the capital, Sinja. It took control of other cities such as Dinder, Al Mazmum / Mazmoum, and El-Suki and nearby areas connecting it while launching an incursion into Blue Nile state. However in October, the Sudanese military attacked and took control of Jebel Moya. The key area of Jebel Moya being lost led to the RSF losing control of Dinder, El Suki and other areas in Sennar. In November, the Sudanese army recaptured Sinja. On 5 March, SAF launched a counteroffensive on the rest of RSF controlled territory in Sennar, and on the same day take full control over territories, including Mazmoum.

== Location ==
Sinar State is delimited by Al-Gazira State in the north, The Blue Nile State in the south, Al-Gedaref State and the Sudanese Ethiopian borders in the east, and the White Nile State & the Upper Nile State of South Sudan in the west. Singa is the capital of Sennar State while the largest city is Sennar (also known as Mukwar). Other commercial towns include El-Suki and El-Dinder.

== Population and livelihood ==
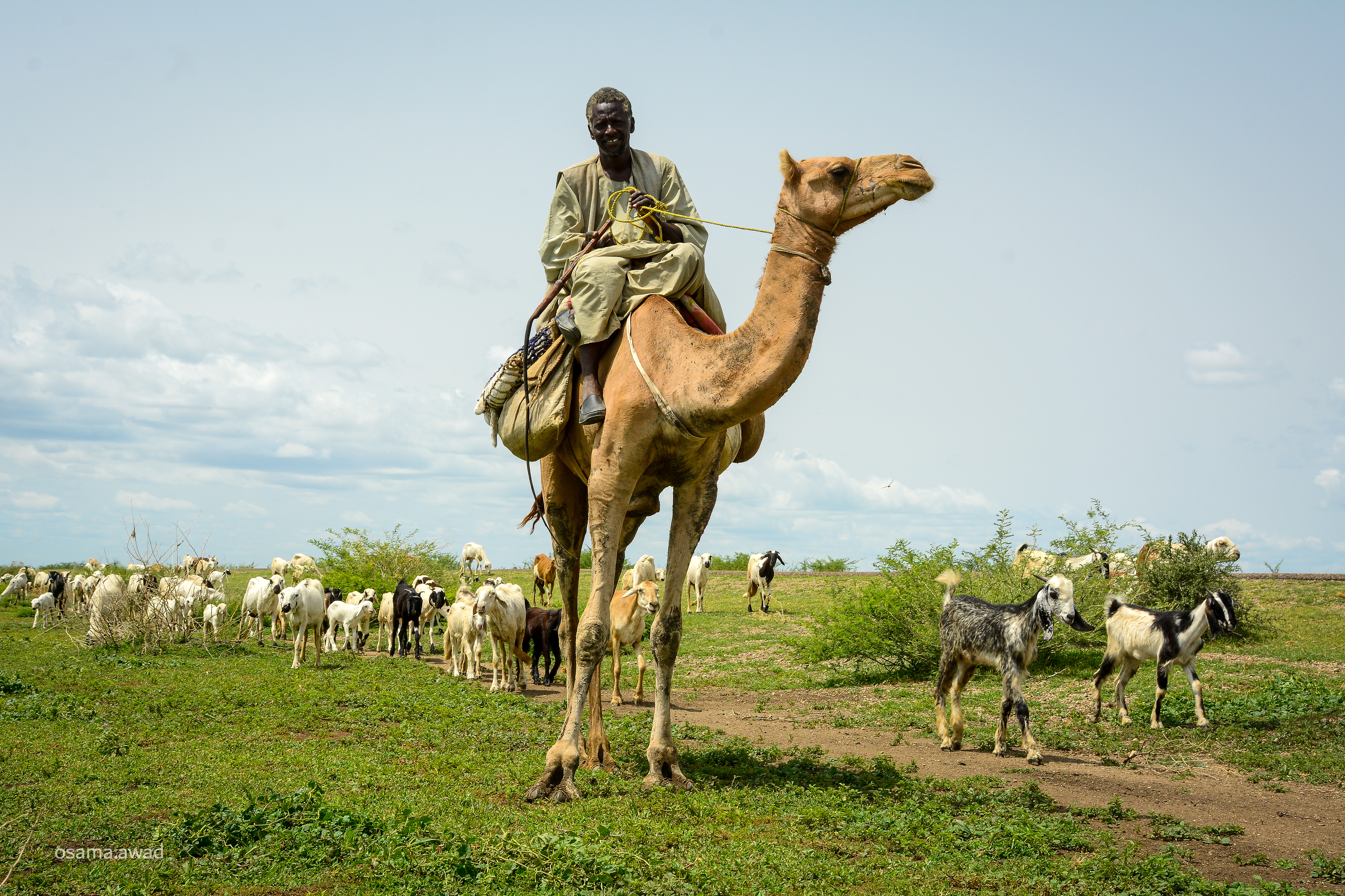
Farming in Sennar

The main economic activity is agriculture, with the irrigated scheme of Suki, the sugar factory of Sennar, and a number of fruit growers (including bananas and mangoes) located on the banks of the Blue Nile. In terms of education, The University of Sennar is the only higher education university throughout all the state, attended by all its residents.

== Main cities ==
- Singa (capital)
- Sennar
- Al Suki / El Suki / Alsooki
- Dinder
- Al-Dali / Aldali
- East
- Abu Hugar / Abohugar

== Districts ==
Districts of Sennar

1. Sennar District
2. Singa District
3. Ad Dinder District

== Tourism ==
The state is famous for its Dinder National Park.

== See also ==
- Wad al-'Abbas
