= Khartoum State =

State of Sudan

Khartoum State ولاية الخرطوم Wilāyat al-Kharṭūm
- State
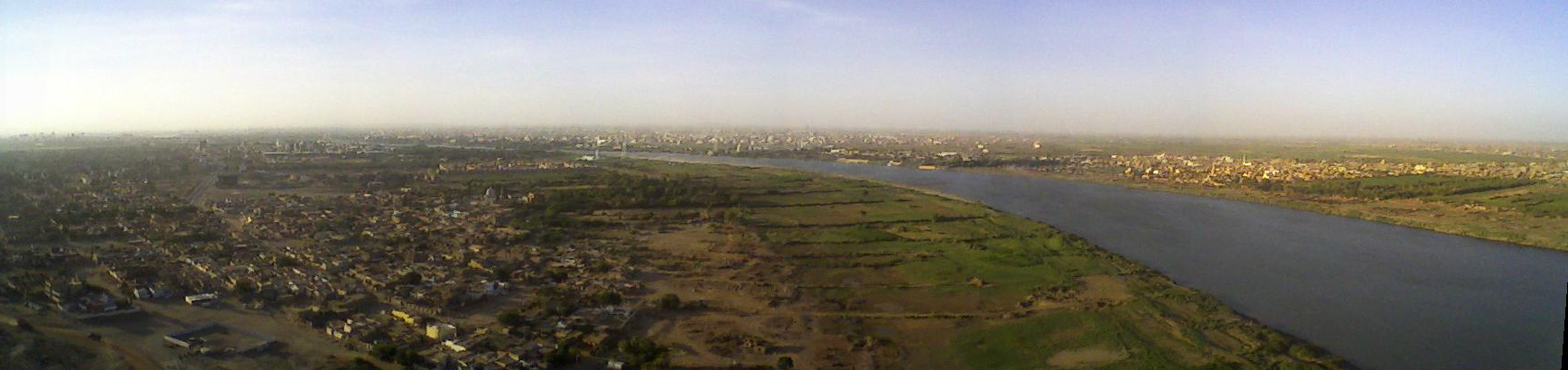

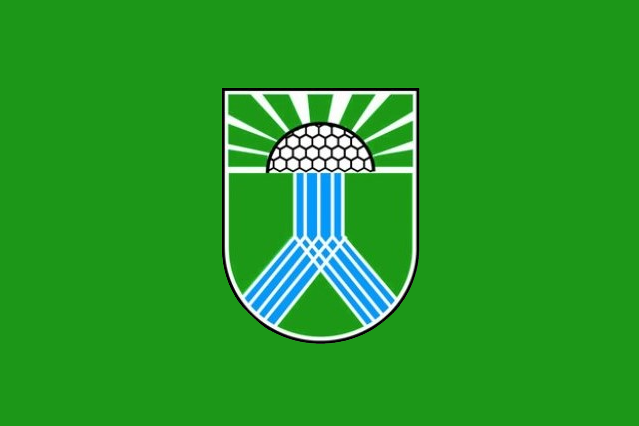
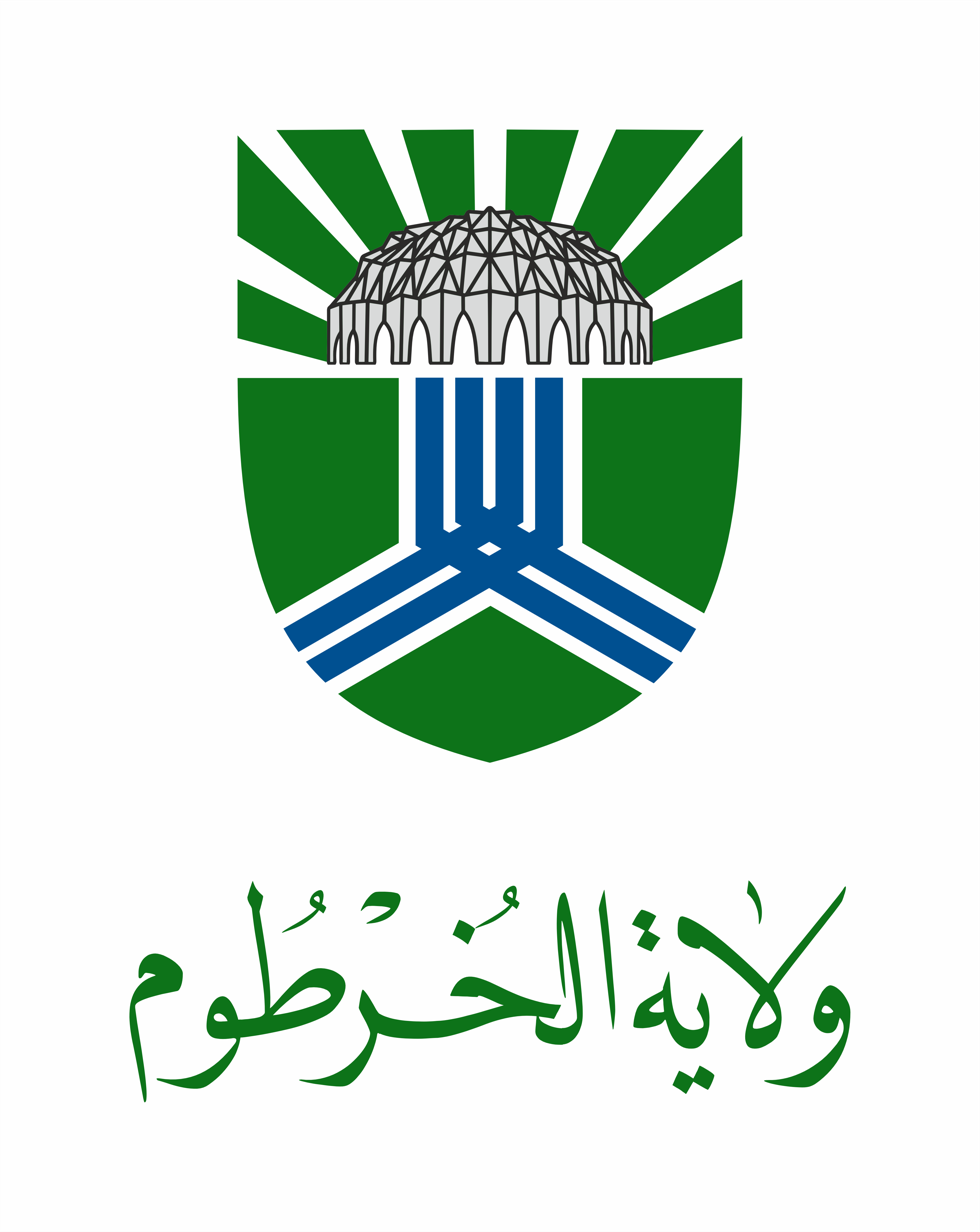
- Flag Seal

- Location in Sudan.
- Coordinates: 15°47′N 32°43′E
- Country: Sudan
- Region: Butana
- Capital: Khartoum

Government
  - Governor: Ahmed Osman

Area
  - Total: 22,142 km^{2} (8,549 sq mi)

Population (2018 est.)
  - Total: 7,993,900
  - Density: 361.03/km^{2} (935.06/sq mi)
- Central Bureau of Statistics Sudan (web)
- Time zone: UTC+2 (CAT)
- ISO 3166-2: SD-KH
- HDI (2023): 0.633 medium · 1st
- Website: http://krt.gov.sd http://khartoum.gov.sd/

Khartoum State (Arabic: ولاية الخرطوم, romanized: Wilāyat al-Kharṭūm) is one of the eighteen states of Sudan. Although it is the smallest state by area (22,142 km^{2}), it is the most populous state in Sudan—5,274,321 in the 2008 census, and officially estimated at 7,993,900 in 2018. It contains the Triangular capital consisting of the capital and largest city by population, Khartoum, as well as the cities of Khartoum North and Omdurman. Khartoum city is the capital of both Khartoum State and Sudan.

The three cities are located in the heart of Sudan at the confluence of the White Nile and the Blue Nile, where the two rivers unite to form the River Nile. The confluence of the two rivers creates a unique effect. As they join, each river retains its own color: the White Nile with its bright whiteness and the Blue Nile with its alluvial brown color. These colors are more visible in the flood season.

The state lies between longitudes 31.5 to 34°E and latitudes 15 to 16°N. It is surrounded by River Nile State in the north-east, in the north-west by the Northern State, in the east and southeast by the states of Kassala, Qadarif, Gezira and White Nile State, and in the west by North Kurdufan.

== History ==
Before the Funj sultanate the area was home to the Anaj or known as the Nubians of Alodia, after Soba fell to Abdallah jama The Nubians of this region came to be known as the Abdallab and continued to be the indigenous people of Khartoum State whose capital was just north of the modern day city of Khartoum under the Funj and later Turkish control. Since Anglo Egyptian rule and the British making it the capital of Sudan, people from all across Sudan have migrated to the Abdallabi homeland, Khartoum State.

== Etymology ==
There are several etymologies for the name of Khartoum. The explanation suggested as "most correct" by the state government's website is that it comes from the Arabic for "elephant's trunk", which describes the shape of the site of the city at the confluence of the two Niles, where a stretch of land extends into the water. Other stories are that it is a corruption of "gurtoum", the name for seeds of the sunflower plant, supposedly used by Roman invaders at the current site of Khartoum to treat soldiers' wounds, or that it was derived from the words "Khor al-Tom".

== Climate ==
The northern region of the state is mostly desert because it receives barely any rainfall, whereas the other regions have semi-desert climates. The weather is rainy in the fall, and cold and dry in the winter. Average rainfall reaches 100–200 mm (4–8 in) in the north-eastern areas and 200–300 mm (8–12 in) in the northwestern areas.

The temperature in summer ranges from 25 to 40 °C (77–104 °F) from April to June, and from 20 to 35 °C (68–95 °F) in the months of July to October. In winter, the temperature declines gradually from 25 °C (77 °F) to 15 °C (59 °F) between November and March.

== Localities ==
Khartoum has seven Localities:

- Khartoum (Capital)
- Omdurman
- Khartoum North
- Sharq an-Nīl
- Jabal Awliya
- Om Badda
- Karari

== Districts ==
Districts of Khartoum

1. Khartoum District
2. Um Badda District
3. Omdurman District
4. Karary District
5. Khartoum Bahri District
6. Sharg En Nile (East Nile) District
7. South Khartoum District

== Population and economy ==
The 2008 population census estimated the population of Khartoum State to be about 5,274,321 capita, composed of various tribes of the Sudan. The population was officially estimated to have risen to 7,993,900 in 2018. The population in 2008 was 79% urban, and 74% of the state's population reported their region of origin to be outside Khartoum.

The areas of Omdurman and the rural South are inhabited by the tribe of Gamowia, as well as by the Kordofani tribes displaced to these areas by the drought and desertification that hit their areas in the early- and mid-1980s. These are the tribes of the Kababish and the Kawahla. In the northern countryside of Karari locality are the tribe of Shiheinat, and in Khartoum North the tribes of Abdallab and Batahin. In the East Nile are the tribes of Abu Dileig, Batahin, and Kawahla, with the tribe of Iseilat in Um-Dowan.

Most of the population works in government service, the private sector, and banking. There is also a large number of merchants, and migrants and displaced people working in marginal activities. In the countryside most people are engaged in agriculture and grazing and thus supply the capital, Khartoum, with vegetables, fruits, and dairy products. There are also some residents living on the banks of the rivers engaged in the trades dependent on the rivers, such as pottery, brick-making and fishing. Above all stands the strong ambition to become the new Dubai with the financial support coming from the oil and gas supplies of the country. The State of Khartoum is now the largest center in Sudan for the manufacturing sector with more than 7500 different factories and more than ten industrial areas providing all types of goods such as food processing and electronics and household appliances as well as medicines and textiles as well as footwear and tanneries and chemicals. Within the next year five Chinese car manufacturers will start operations to make Khartoum a hub for vehicle manufacturing in Africa.

== Museums and archeological sites ==
Khartoum state contains archaeological sites dating back to different periods of civilization, both prehistoric and historical. Its museums include the largest in Sudan, the National Museum of Sudan, and a number of specialized museums, such as the Khalifa House Museum and the Museums of Natural History, Folklore and the Popular Heritage. There are also a center for study of folklore under the National Authority for the Arts, and the Omdurman Museum of Ibrahim Hijazi.

== List of Governors Khartoum ==
c.1837 * Khartoum a province of Egyptian Sudan.

Governors c.1837 - 1861 ....

- 1861 - 1863 Muhammad Rasikh Bey (b. c.1834 - d. 1883)
- 1863 - 1877 ....

1877 Mustafa Bey Murad

- 1877 Muhammad Ma'ani Bey Governors (d. 1881)
- 1877 - 1878 `Uthman Rifiq Pasha (b. 1839 - d. 1886)
- 1878 Busati Bey Madani (b. 1850 - d. 1883)
- Feb 1991 - Feb 1994 Mohammed Saeed
- Feb 1994 - Dec 1997 Badr al-Din Taha
- Dec 1997 - Feb 2001 Majdhub al-Khalifa
- Feb 2001 - 8 May 2009 Abd al-Halim Ismail al-Muta'afi
- 8 May 2009 - Jun 2015 Abdul-Rahman Al-Khidir
- Jun 2015 - 22 Feb 2019 Abdul-Rahim Mohamed Hussein
- 24 Feb 2019 - 16 Apr 2019 Hashim Osman al-Hussein
- 16 Apr 2019 - 18 Jun 2019 Murtadha Abdalla Warraq
- 18 Jun 2019 - 16 Apr 2020 Ahmed Abdoun Hammad
- 16 Apr 2020 - 2020 Youssef Adam Aldai (acting)
- 27 Jul 2020 - 2022 Ayman Khaled Nimer
- 1 Mar 2022 - Ahmed Osman Hamza
