= South Darfur =

State of Sudan

South Darfur جنوب دارفور Janob Darfor
- State
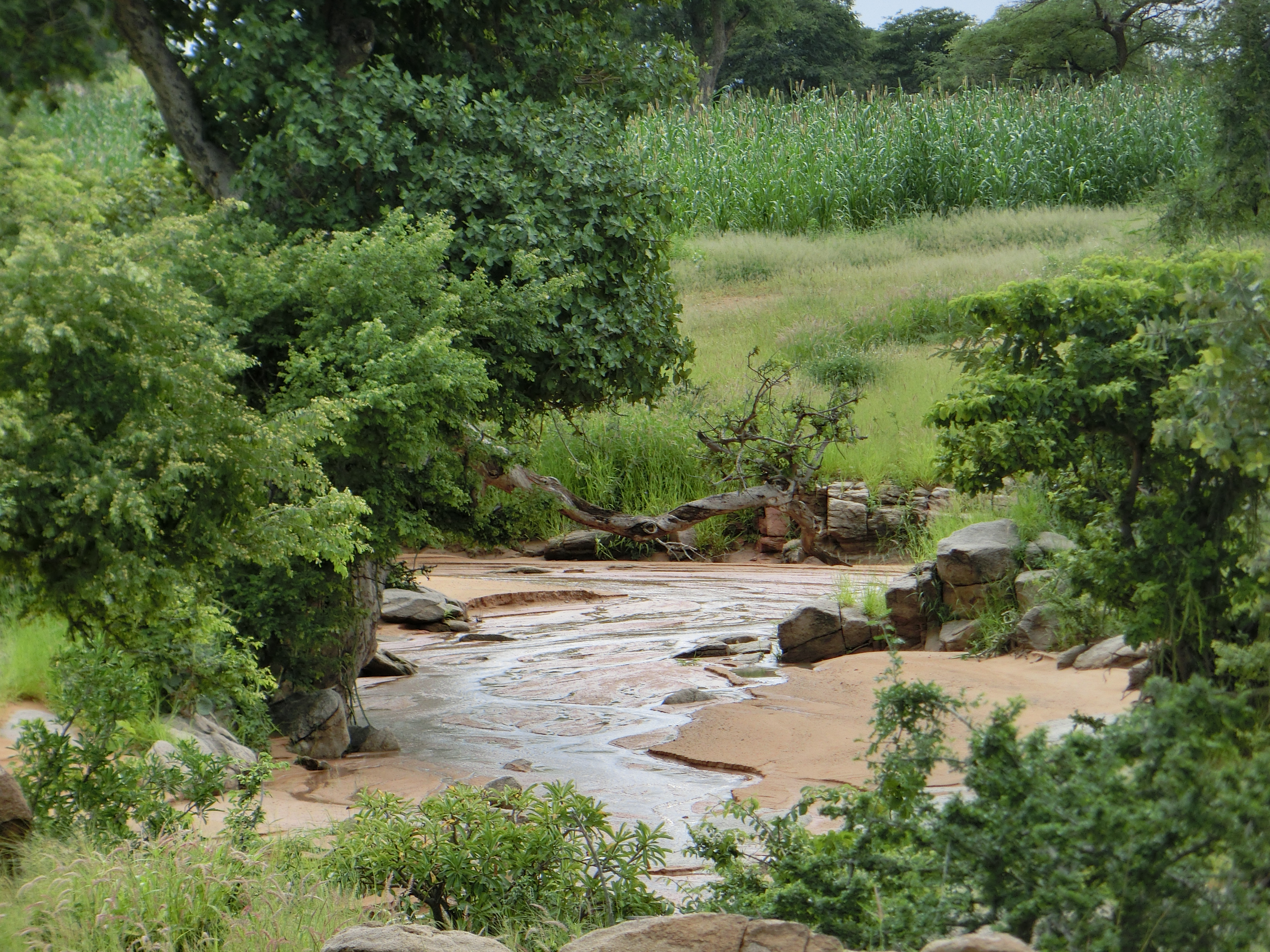
- Agricultural activities in South Darfur

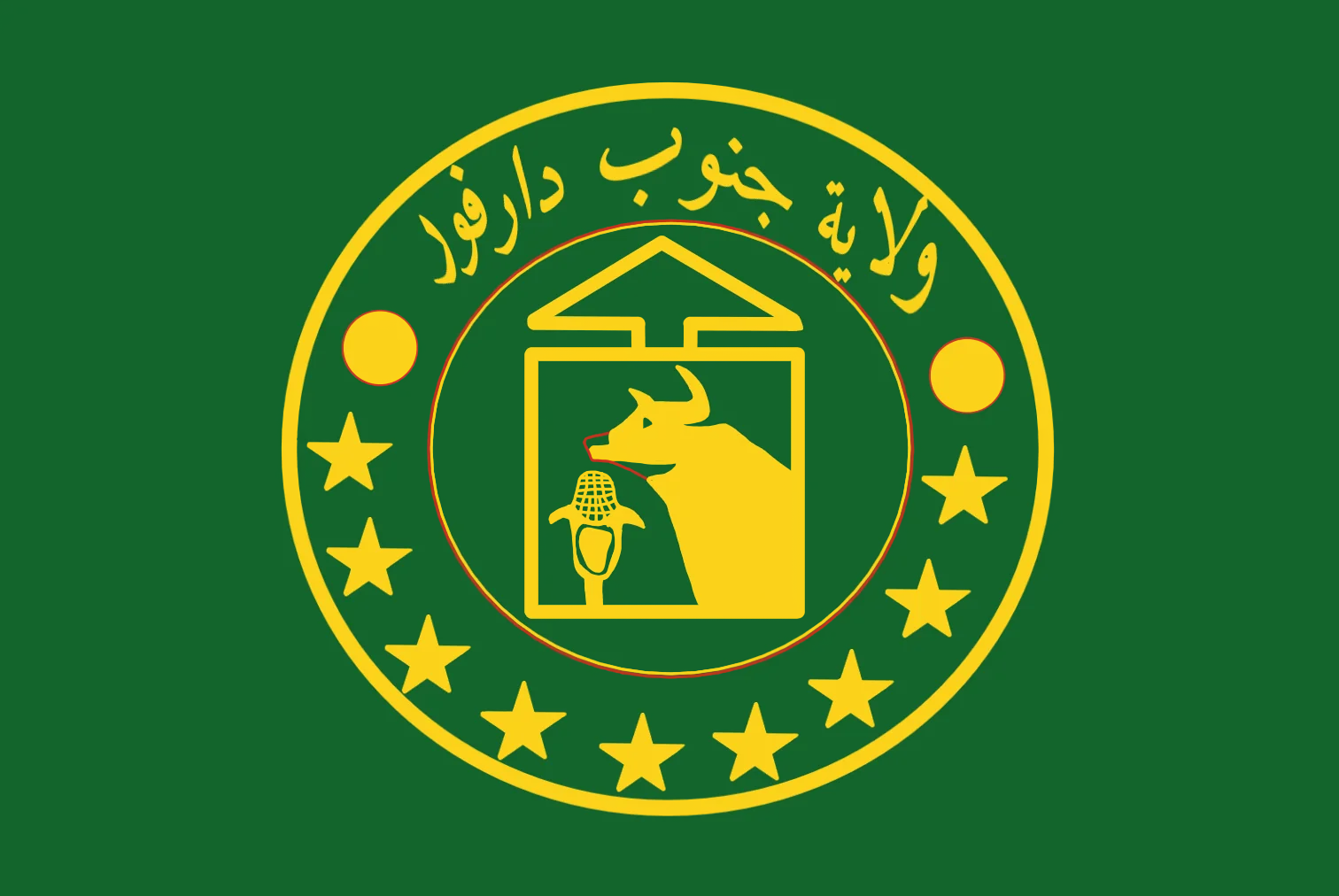
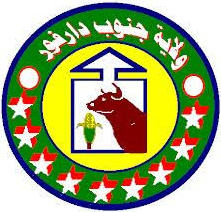
- Flag Seal

- Location in Sudan
- Coordinates: 11°31′N 25°2′E
- Country: Sudan
- Region: Darfur
- No. of counties: 21
- Capital: Nyala

Government
  - Type: Contested
  - Governor (De jure): Bashir Mursal (acting)
  - Head of Civil Administration (De facto): Al-Zain Ahmed Al-Haj (RSF-backed)

Population (2018)
  - Total: 5,353,025
- Time zone: UTC+2 (CAT)
- HDI (2017): 0.434 low

South Darfur State (Arabic: ولاية جنوب دارفور Wilāyat Ǧanūb Dārfūr; Janob Darfor) is one of the states of Sudan. It is one of the five states that compose the region of Darfur in western Sudan. It borders North Darfur to the north, Central Darfur to the west, Central African Republic and South Sudan to the south, and East Darfur to the east. It is the most populous state in Darfur and has the highest number of internally displaced persons (IDPs) in the region. The capital and largest city is Nyala.

Since the outbreak of the 2023 Sudanese civil war, control over the state has been heavily contested. Following the fall of Nyala in late 2023, the Rapid Support Forces (RSF) established a de facto "Civil Administration" in the state, while the recognized Sudanese government in Port Sudan operates through an acting governor in exile.

== Geography ==
South Darfur is located in western Sudan. It is bordered by North Darfur to the north, Central Darfur to the west, the Central African Republic to the southwest, the states of Western Bahr el Ghazal and Northern Bahr el Ghazal (both in South Sudan) to the south, and East Darfur to the east.

Prior to the creation of two new states in the Darfur region in January 2012, South Darfur encompassed a much larger territory with an area of 127,300 square kilometres (49,200 sq mi) and an estimated population of approximately 2,890,000 in 2006. The eastern portion of this territory was subsequently carved out to form East Darfur. The state has a hot semi-arid climate and is prone to severe droughts; it was heavily affected by the 2010 Sahel famine.

== Demographics ==
According to the 2008 Sudan census, the boundaries of South Darfur had a population of 4,069,300. By 2018, the population was projected at 5,353,025. The state hosts a massive displaced population due to decades of conflict in the region, including approximately 49,800 refugees and asylum seekers. As of 2022, there were 31 camps and 10 neighborhoods in the state specifically designated for internally displaced populations.

== Economy and Infrastructure ==
Agriculture, livestock, and cross-border trade form the backbone of South Darfur's economy. The capital, Nyala, serves as the primary commercial hub for the region, acting as a major trading center for gum arabic and hosting local industries that produce textiles, processed foods, and leather goods.

South Darfur is historically connected to Khartoum by a railway line, with Nyala serving as the terminal station. Paved roads link the state to Zalingei and Al-Fashir. However, decades of neglect and recent warfare have severely damaged the state's infrastructure. Water management remains a critical issue, with heavily contaminated groundwater causing recurrent health crises.

Following the outbreak of the civil war in 2023, the state suffered a total electricity blackout. In August 2025, the RSF-aligned civil administration initiated a major solar power project in Nyala, utilizing private contractors to install solar units along key corridors such as the Jebel Marra Road, as restoring the conventional Turkish power station was deemed unfeasible due to millions of dollars in damages and looted equipment.

== Education and Healthcare ==
The state is home to Nyala University, a public university established in 1994 to expand higher education access in the Darfur region.

Healthcare in South Darfur relies heavily on international NGOs, though operations have been severely disrupted by the ongoing conflict. Notable facilities include the Nyala Paediatric Centre, operated by the Italian NGO Emergency, which provides free paediatric care and malnutrition screening. The centre was looted by the Rapid Support Forces in October 2023, though local staff managed to restart some services in subsequent months. The state also hosts the Amel Center, a renowned treatment and rehabilitation facility for victims of torture, whose directors have received international accolades, including the Olof Palme Prize and the Robert F. Kennedy Human Rights Award.

== Localities ==
The state is administratively divided into various localities, including:

- Nyala (Capital)
- Buram
- Ed Forsan
- Gereida
- Kas
- Kubum
- Markondi
- Katila
- Um Dafuq
- Damsu
- Al Senta
- Manawashi
- Mershing
- Misherinj
- Al Salam
- Rahid Al-Bardi
- Tulus

== See also ==
- 2010 Sahel famine
- Darfur genocide
- Sudanese civil war (2023–present)
- Dar Erenga
