= States of Sudan =

Sudanese States الولايات السودانية (Arabic)
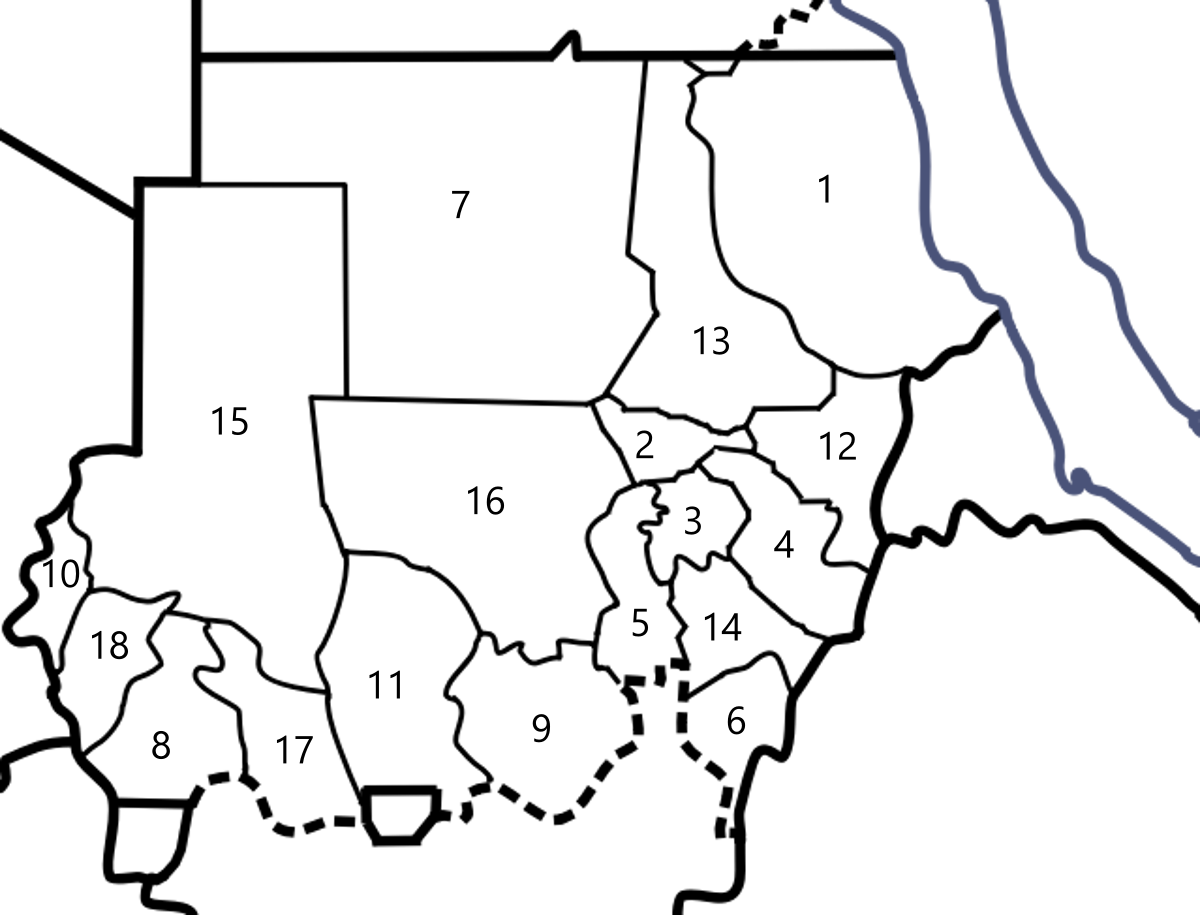
- Category: Federated state
- Location: Republic of the Sudan
- Number: 18 states
- Populations: 832,112 (Blue Nile) – 5,274,371 (Khartoum)
- Areas: 22,140 km^{2} (8,549 sq mi) (Khartoum) – 348,770 km^{2} (134,659 sq mi) (Northern)
- Government: State government
- Subdivisions: Districts

Below is a list of the 18 states of the Sudan (Arabic names are in parentheses). Prior to 9 July 2011, the Republic of the Sudan was composed of 25 states. The ten southern states now form part of the independent country of South Sudan. Two additional states were created in 2012 within the Darfur region, and one in 2013 in Kordofan, bringing the total to 18.

== History ==
Anglo-Egyptian Sudan had eight mudiriyat, or provinces, which were ambiguous when created but became well defined by the beginning of World War II. The eight provinces were: Blue Nile, Darfur, Equatoria, Kassala, Khartoum, Kordofan, Northern, and Upper Nile. In 1948, Bahr al Ghazal split from Equatoria.

There were numerous new provinces created on 1 July 1973. North and South Darfur were created from Darfur, while Kurdufan divided into North and South Kordofan. Gezira and White Nile were split off from Blue Nile. River Nile split off from Northern. Red Sea was split off from Kassala.

A further fracturing of provinces occurred in 1976. Lakes split from Bahr al Ghazal, and Jonglei split off from Upper Nile. Equatoria divided into Eastern and Western Equatoria. There were thus eighteen provinces. In 1991, the government reorganized the administrative regions into nine federal states, matching the nine provinces that had existed from 1948 to 1973. On 14 February 1994, the government reorganized yet again, creating twenty-six wilayat (states). The majority of the wilayat were either the old provinces or administrative subregions of a province. As part of the new government structure in South Sudan in 2005, Bahr al Jabal was renamed Central Equatoria. In 2006, West Kurdufan was split and merged with North Kurdufan and South Kordofan.

In January 2012, the new states of Central Darfur and East Darfur were created in the Darfur region, bringing the total number of states to 17. In July 2013, West Kurdufan was reestablished.

Since the 2019 Sudanese coup d'état, the states in Sudan have been without state governments and legislative councils.

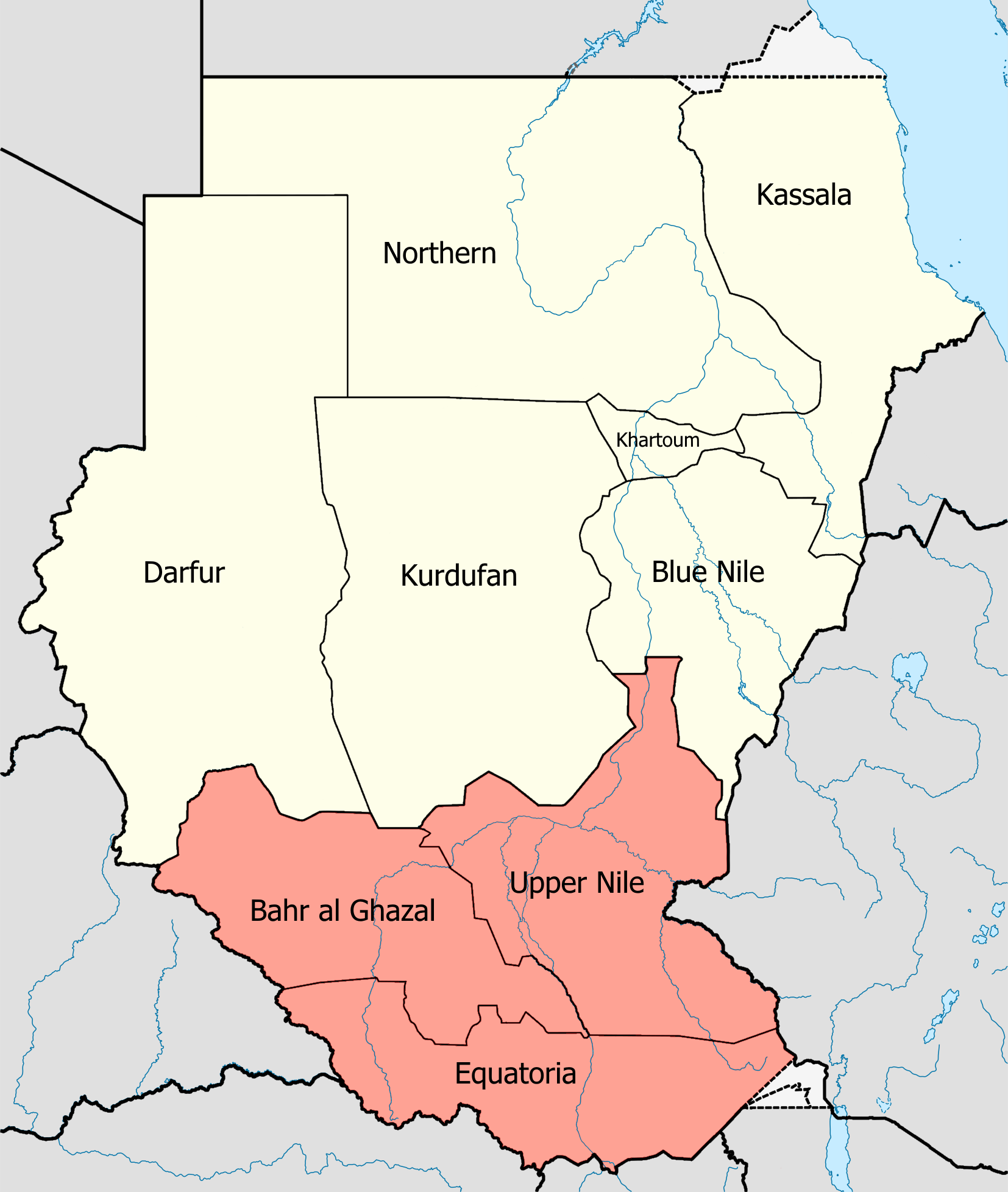
Provinces of Anglo-Egyptian Sudan in 1948. Provinces of the future South Sudan are coloured in red.

Regions of Sudan, July 2006 Darfur South Sudan (held referendum in 2011, seceded in July 2011) Abyei (to have held referendum in 2011, postponed indefinitely) States to have held "popular consultations" in 2011: South Kordofan (process suspended) and Blue Nile (status unclear)

== States of the Republic of the Sudan ==
The following 18 states form the territory of the Republic of the Sudan:

States of Sudan
Number on map	Location	Seal	State name		ISO 3166-2 code	Capital	Area in km^{2} (sq mi)	Population (2018)	Density (per km²)	Former Region
Number on map	Location	Seal	English	Arabic	ISO 3166-2 code	Capital	Area in km^{2} (sq mi)	Population (2018)	Density (per km²)	Former Region
1			Khartoum	ولاية الخرطوم (Wilāyat al-Kharṭūm)	KH	Khartoum	22,142 km^{2} (8,549 sq mi)	7,993,900	361	Khartoum
2			North Kordofan	شمال كردفان (Shamāl Kurdufān)	KN	El Obeid	185,302 km^{2} (71,546 sq mi)	3,174,029	17	Kordofan
3			Northern	الشمالية (ash-Shamālīyah)	NO	Dongola	348,765 km^{2} (134,659 sq mi)	936,255	3	Northern
4			Kassala	كسلا (Kassalā)	KA	Kassala	52,949 km^{2} (20,444 sq mi)	2,519,071	48	Kassala
5			Blue Nile	النيل الأزرق (an-Nīl al-Azraq)	NB	ad-Damazin	45,844 km^{2} (17,700 sq mi)	1,108,391	24	Blue Nile
6			North Darfur	شمال دارفور (Shamāl Dārfūr)	DN	al-Fashir	296,420 km^{2} (114,450 sq mi)	2,304,950	8	Darfur
7			South Darfur	جنوب دارفور (Janūb Dārfūr)	DS	Nyala	81,000 km^{2} (31,000 sq mi)	5,353,025	66	Darfur
8			South Kordofan	جنوب كردفان (Janūb Kurdufān)	KS	Kadugli	158,355 km^{2} (61,141 sq mi)	2,107,623	13	Kordofan
9			Gezira	الجزيرة (al-Jazīrah)	GZ	Wad Madani	27,549 km^{2} (10,637 sq mi)	5,096,920	185	Blue Nile
10			White Nile	النيل الأبيض (an-Nīl al-Abyaḑ)	NW	Rabak	39,701 km^{2} (15,329 sq mi)	2,493,880	63	Blue Nile
11			River Nile	نهر النيل (Nahr an-Nīl)	NR	ad-Damir	122,123 km^{2} (47,152 sq mi)	1,511,442	12	Northern
12			Red Sea	البحر الأحمر (al-Baḥr al-Aḥmar)	RS	Port Sudan	218,887 km^{2} (84,513 sq mi)	1,482,053	7	Kassala
13			al Qadarif	القضارف (al-Qaḍārif)	GD	el-Gadarif	75,263 km^{2} (29,059 sq mi)	2,208,385	29	Blue Nile
14			Sennar	سنار (Sinnār)	SI	Singa	37,844 km^{2} (14,612 sq mi)	1,918,692	51	Blue Nile
15			West Darfur	غرب دارفور (Gharb Dārfūr)	DW	el Geneina	23,550 km^{2} (9,090 sq mi)	1,775,945	75	Darfur
16			Central Darfur	وسط دارفور (Wasaṭ Dārfūr)	DC	Zalingei	46,729 km^{2} (18,042 sq mi)	2,499,000	53	Darfur
17			East Darfur	شرق دارفور (Sharq Dārfūr)	DE	Ed Daein	52,867 km^{2} (20,412 sq mi)	1,587,200	30	Darfur
18			West Kordofan	غرب كردفان (Gharb Kurdufān)	GK	al-Fulah	111,373 km^{2} (43,001 sq mi)	1,945,450 (2014)	17	Kordofan

=== Former states now part of South Sudan ===
On 9 July 2011, the ten southern states became the independent country of South Sudan. They were further divided into 86 counties.

=== Special administrative areas ===
- The Abyei Area, located on the border between South Sudan and the Republic of the Sudan, currently has a special administrative status and is governed by an Abyei Area Administration. It was due to hold a referendum in 2011 on whether to be part of South Sudan or part of the Republic of Sudan.

=== Regional bodies ===
In addition to the states, there also exist regional administrative bodies established by peace agreements between the central government and rebel groups:

- The Darfur Regional Government was established by the Darfur Peace Agreement to act as a co-ordinating body for the states that make up the region of Darfur.
- The Eastern Sudan States Coordinating Council was established by the Eastern Sudan Peace Agreement between the Sudanese Government and the rebel Eastern Front to act as a coordinating body for the three eastern states of Red Sea, Kassala, and Al Qadarif.

== See also ==
- Dar Erenga
- ISO 3166-2:SD
- List of current state governors in Sudan
- List of Sudanese states by population
- List of Sudanese states by Human Development Index
- States of South Sudan — first-level administrative division of the Republic of South Sudan
