= Masalit genocide =

Ongoing genocide in West Darfur, Sudan

- Part of the second Darfur genocide and war crimes during the Sudanese civil war
- West Darfur highlighted in Sudan
- Location: 13°27′N 22°27′E; West Darfur, Sudan
- Date: 24 April 2023 – present
- Target: Masalit people, Fur people, Zaghawa people, Berti people, Tama people, Erenga people
- Attack type: Genocide, mass killings, massacres, ethnic cleansing
- Deaths: At least 10,800 - 17,000 plus (Note: 10,000 - 15,000 Geneina; 800 - 2,000 Ardamata)
- Perpetrators: (Sudan) Government of Peace and Unity; Rapid Support Forces (denied by RSF); Janjaweed; United Arab Emirates (Accused by Sudan, denied by UAE)
- Motive: Arab supremacy Anti-Black racism

The Masalit genocide is a series of ongoing persecutions and mass killings of the Masalit people in West Darfur carried out by the Rapid Support Forces (RSF) and its allies as part of the Darfur genocide. The genocide has been recognized by Genocide Watch, the government of the United States, American academic Eric Reeves, Governor of West Darfur Khamis Abakar, and The Economist.

The genocide started in 2023 when the RSF began committing organized massacres of Masalit civilians in Darfur days after the beginning of the Sudanese civil war. It has encompassed the Ardamata massacre, Misterei massacre, and Battle of Geneina, all of which targeted Masalit civilians in the area of Geneina in West Darfur, as well as the El Fasher massacre, which is targeting the Zaghawa people in North Darfur.

== Background ==
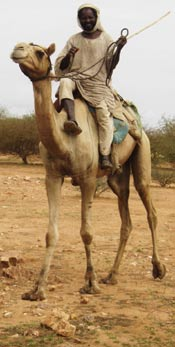
The Janjaweed have been a major player in the conflict.

Given that the army was consistently losing, the war effort switched to emphasize three elements: military intelligence, the air force and the Janjaweed. The latter were armed Baggara herders whom the government had used to suppress a Masalit uprising from 1986 to 1999. The Janjaweed became the center of the new counter-insurgency strategy. Though the government consistently denied supporting them, military resources were poured into Darfur and the Janjaweed were outfitted as a paramilitary force, complete with communication equipment and some artillery. The military planners were aware of the probable consequences of such a strategy: similar methods undertaken in the Nuba Mountains and around the southern oil fields during the 1990s had resulted in massive human rights violations and forced displacements.

In December 2020, Sudan started to deploy troops to South Darfur "in large numbers", following recent tribal violence between the Masalit and Fula. On 16 January fighting between Masalit people and Arab nomads in Al Geneina District, West Darfur, left 84 dead and 160 wounded. This was two weeks after the United Nations withdrew its peacekeepers from the region. Based on a statement from the Darfur Bar Association, the incident began when a member of an Arab tribe was stabbed by another member of the Masalit tribe. Following the unrest, a high profile delegation authorized by Sudanese Prime Minister Abdalla Hamdok was sent to the region in order to assess the situation.

On 17 January, a curfew was put in place by the Sudanese authorities, including a state of emergency in West Darfur region.

The United Nations has urged the Sudanese government to see to the de-escalation of the violence in West Darfur and safeguard civilian lives.

On 12 April, following several days of violence in West Darfur that led to the deaths of at least 144 people, chairman of the ruling Transitional Sovereignty Council, Abdel Fattah al-Burhan, along with high-ranking security and military officials, visited Geneina, capital of West Darfur, where they held separate talks with the Arab Rizeigat and the non-Arab Masalit tribes. After the visit, the Dar Masalit Displaced People expressed their refusal to accept the result of the mediation headed by al-Burhan. They blamed the paramilitary Rapid Support Forces for the unrest in the region.

== Massacres ==
Following the Battle of Geneina in 2023, more than a thousand bodies were left in mass graves in the town of El Geneina.

In January 2024, it was revealed that a report to the UN Security Council estimated that 10,000–15,000 people were killed in El Geneina.

According to accounts by survivors, massacres were coordinated, specifically targeting Masalit and other dark-skinned inhabitants of Darfur, as opposed to the Sudanese Arab population. The Rapid Support Forces denied involvement, characterizing the situation as a tribal conflict, while Arab tribal leaders denied being involved in ethnic cleansing and held the Masalit responsible for starting the conflict.

=== Geneina massacre ===
On 13 July 2023, a UN investigation discovered a mass grave of 87 individuals, all Masalit civilians, near Geneina. The civilians were killed by the Rapid Support Forces between 13 and 21 June. Many of the dead were from al-Madariss and al-Jamarik neighborhoods. Volker Türk, the UN High Commissioner for Human Rights, deplored the killings and stated that the UN was not allowed access to the site until July.

During an attack on 19 June 2023, emir Badawi Masri Balhredin, cousin of the Dar Masalit sultan, was killed by the RSF. Several other prominent people were killed in attacks on 19 and 20 June, including Sadig Haroun, the Commissioner of Humanitarian Aid in the city, and several mayors and imams. The Darfur Bar Association reported the next day that the refugee camps of Kreinik and Sirba were under siege by the RSF. All makeshift shelters and refugee camps had been burned down by 20 June. Numerous villages, neighborhoods, and cultural sites in and around Geneina were destroyed, including the city's Grand Market and the palace of the Masalit Sultanate.

On 22 June, the Dar Masalit Sultanate also released a statement claiming more than 5,000 civilians had been killed between 24 April and 24 June, the majority of whom were non-Arabs. The Sultanate called the situation a "genocide", and footage emerged of corpses being used as barricades, and the bodies of men, women, and children strewn across the streets. Refugees from West Darfur speaking to Al Jazeera in late June corroborated these claims, adding that similar situations unfolded in the West Darfur towns of Misteri, Konga Haraza, and Tendelti between April and June. The RSF also attacked civilians in June on the road between Geneina and the Sudanese-Chadian border. Many of these killings were at RSF checkpoints, where a pregnant woman was killed by militiamen for not having enough money for passage. A Geneina refugee stated that "the road along El Geneina and Adré has a lot of bodies, nobody can count them". Another source claimed over 350 people were killed on the road alone.

While Masalit people were often the target of Arab militiamen, refugees claimed the militiamen shot at anyone black. Prominent civil society members, including lawyers, humanitarian officials, and more, were targeted by militias and the RSF after and during the fall of the city. The Darfur Bar Association called the ethnic cleansing "a full-scale genocide". The United Nations released a statement on 24 June deploring "wanton killings", but did not mention perpetrators. An officer at the UNHCR office in Adre stated that the RSF intentionally killed men and boys to "[eliminate] future fighters as well as the line of ancestry of a specific ethnic group."

=== Misterei massacre ===
Prior to the Misterei attack, a group of 300 RSF fighters and allied tribes surrounded the town on the night of May 27, with the exceptions of the south and west, where the fighters entered the town. The fighters came from the Arab tribes Awlad Rashid, Misseriya, and Awlad Janoob, led by Mohamed Zain Taj Eldien and Hamid Yousef Mustafa. Some of the assailants came from the Mima and Bargo ethnic groups. The attackers arrived in twelve Land Cruisers, eight of which were RSF-owned, four of which were private. Other fighters rode on around 150 horses and 140 motorcycles. Around 90 Sudanese Alliance militants, a signatory of the Juba Agreement, intervened in the town, led by Cpt. Elteybe Abdulla Ahmed. Residents were fearful following the surrounding of the town, but there was "no way out".

The first clashes began at Shorrong mountain right after sunrise, when Janjaweed launched an offensive from the west. Later offensives came from the north and south. The Janjaweed came in waves, according to a veteran of the attacks, and many of the self-defense groups were spread out across and around the town in groups of 7 to 15. The Masalit self-defense groups quickly fell to the Janjaweed. Battles between the Sudanese Alliance and the Janjaweed lasted for three and a half hours, during which civilians stated the Arab fighters went house to house, killing darker-skinned Masalit and shouting "Kill the slave, kill the slave!"

Wounded civilians were brought to the Atik mosque, although Janjaweed stormed the place and shot at the wounded and those attending to them. After killing several people, Arab fighters cheered "We killed the zorga! (a slur for black people)." The Janjaweed also looted houses, farms, and shops, before burning down many neighborhoods. The Misterei market was completely looted and torched. Satellite imagery taken on June 3 showed the entire town burnt down.

=== Ardamata massacre ===
On 8 November 2023, the Rapid Support Forces (RSF) and Janjaweed massacred between 800 and 2,000 in Ardamata, Geneina, West Darfur, Sudan – although estimates vary. The attack came after the Sudanese Armed Forces's 15th Infantry Division camp retreated to Chad between during 6-8 November. About 20,000 fled to Chad following the violence. Reports indicated ethnic targeting, mostly the Masalit community, but also members of other non-Arab groups, notably Tama and Erenga people.

== Reactions ==
Khamis Abakar, then governor of West Darfur, denounced the killings as "genocide". He was soon after executed by RSF militants for his statements on 14 June 2023.

As of August 2023, there is an increasing amount of proof suggesting that the RSF is initiating a systematic purge based on ethnicity in Darfur. The United States Holocaust Memorial Museum has issued a warning about the potential escalation into a full-scale genocide. On 10 November 2023, Filippo Grandi, the U.N. High Commissioner, drew parallels between the ongoing violence and the genocide in Darfur recognised by the U.S., where it is estimated that 300,000 people lost their lives from 2003 to 2005. He cautioned that a "similar dynamic might be unfolding."

In October, Genocide Watch issued an alert concerning the situation in Sudan, explicitly characterizing the massacres performed by the Rapid Support Forces against the Masalit people as genocide. This characterization was also shared by US academic Eric Reeves, specialized in Sudan's human rights record, and The Economist.

Josep Borrell, the chief of foreign policy for the European Union, expressed his strong condemnation of the killing of more than 1,000 individuals in Ardamata. He has urgently appealed to the international community to take immediate action to avert a potential "genocide" in the area.

The UK government, witnesses and other observers described the violence in the region as tantamount to ethnic cleansing or even genocide, with non-Arab groups such as the Masalit being the primary victims. Mujeebelrahman Yagoub, Assistant Commissioner for Refugees in West Darfur called the violence worse than the War in Darfur in 2003 and the Rwandan genocide in 1994. The US government also condemned the atrocities, which Secretary of State Antony Blinken described as genocide, and imposed sanctions against RSF leader Mohamed Hamdan Dagalo for his alleged role in the campaign.

Human Rights Watch said in May 2024 that targeting Masalit people with the objective of forcing them to leave the region constitutes ethnic cleansing. The context of the killings raised the "possibility that the RSF and their allies have the intent to destroy in whole or in part the Massalit in at least West Darfur, which would indicate that genocide has been and/or is being committed there".

In 2026, a United Nations fact-finding mission to Sudan found that the RSF's campaign of violence against non-Arab minorities, including the Masalit and others, "presents indications pointing to genocide".

=== International Court of Justice ===
On March 6, 2025, the Sudanese government filed a case against the United Arab Emirates at the International Court of Justice accusing the United Arab Emirates of violating the Genocide Convention and being complicit in genocide and other crimes committed by the RSF on the Masalit. Sudan accused the UAE of enabling the RSF's attacks on Masalit communities by providing them with political, military and financial support, and asked the court to halt the UAE's supply of arms to the militia. The UAE denied the accusations. In an official statement, the UAE described the case as "a cynical publicity stunt". On 5 May 2025 the ICJ rejected the case, stating that it "manifestly lacked" jurisdiction to rule on the merits because the UAE had rejected its jurisdiction despite signing the Genocide Convention.

== See also ==
- 21st-century genocides#Sudan (2023)
- January 2021 Krinding attack
- Darfur genocide
- El Fasher massacre
- Human rights in Sudan
- List of ethnic cleansing campaigns
- List of genocides
- List of massacres in Sudan
- Politics of Sudan
- Sudanese civil war (2023–present)
  - War crimes during the Sudanese civil war (2023–present)
