= Darfur genocide (2023–present) =

Ongoing genocide of non-Arabs in Sudan

Second Darfur genocide
- Part of war crimes during the Sudanese civil war
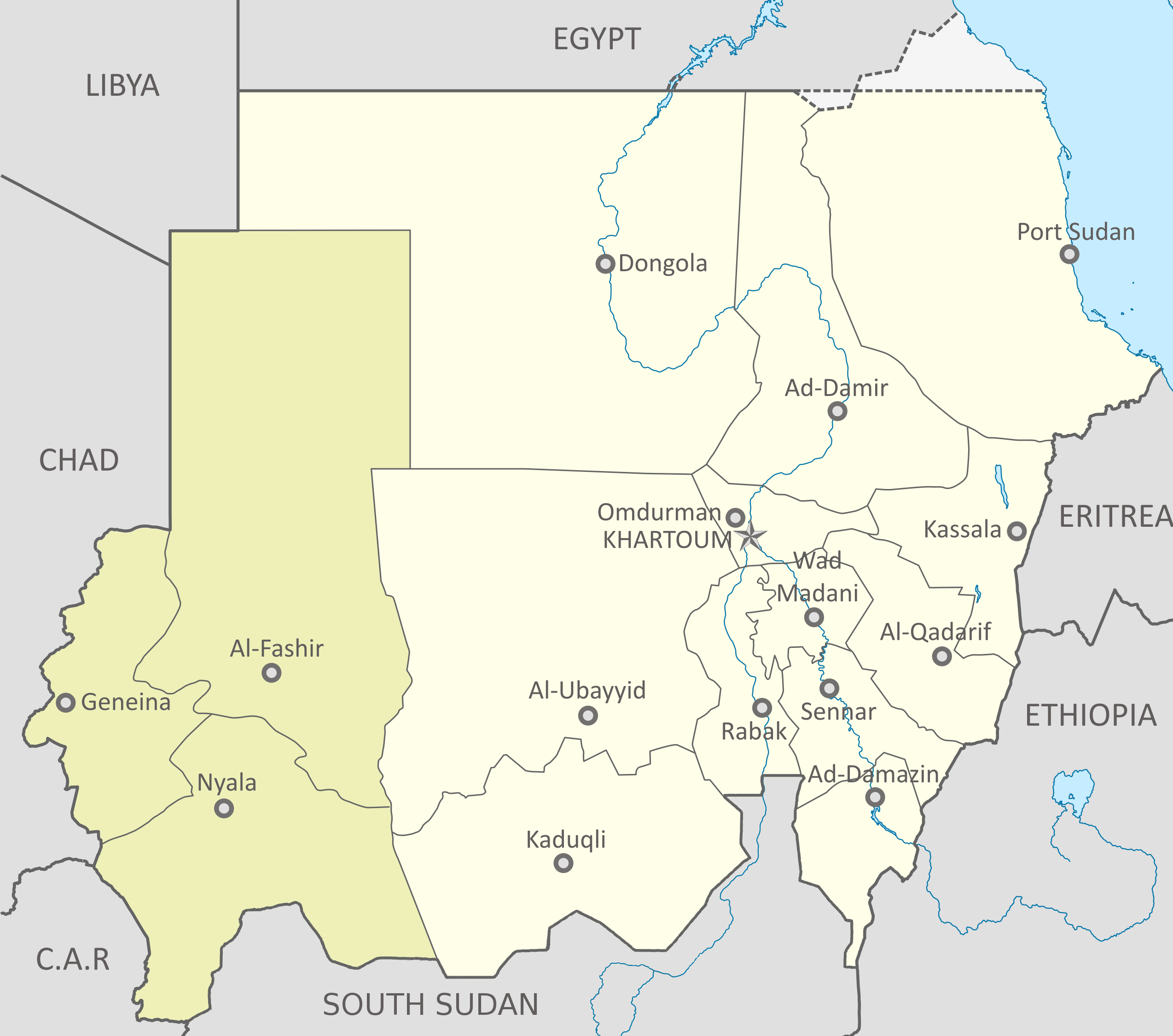
- The Darfur region of Sudan
- Location: Darfur, Sudan
- Date: 15 April 2023 – present
- Target: Masalit, Fur, Zaghawa, Berti, Tama and Erenga people
- Attack type: Genocide, mass killing, ethnic cleansing, scorched earth, starvation, mass looting, mass rape, genocidal rape
- Deaths: At least 60,000 in El Fasher (estimate) and 15,000 in Geneina; over 45,000 infants died from malnutrition
- Perpetrators: Government of Peace and Unity; Rapid Support Forces (denied by RSF); Non-RSF Janjaweed; Arab tribal militias; United Arab Emirates (accused by Sudan, denied by UAE)
- Motive: Tribalism; Arab Supremacy

The Darfur genocide, also known as the second Darfur genocide, is an ongoing series of persecutions and mass killings of non-Arabs in Darfur carried out by the Rapid Support Forces (RSF) and its allies during the Sudanese civil war. The genocide has been recognized by Genocide Watch, the government of the United States, and American academic Eric Reeves.

The genocidal campaign started on 15 April 2023 in conjunction with civil war between the RSF and Sudanese Armed Forces (SAF). The RSF and allied militias began committing organized massacres of non-Arab civilians in all states of Darfur, with the largest occurring throughout 2023 against the Masalit people in the area of Geneina, West Darfur. Also subject to ethnically driven massacres by the RSF and allied groups are parts of the region of Kordofan. Unarmed civilians from the Otoro Nuba people have been deliberately targeted by RSF and allied SPLM-N fighters during the 2026 Kauda clashes in South Kordofan, resulting in at least 61 deaths.

== Background ==
Darfur is a multicultural region in western Sudan, with most of the residents living in the region being Black Africans, although it also is home to many Baggara Arabs, who make up the core of the Rapid Support Forces and Janjaweed. Tensions have existed for years between ethnicities in the region.

Darfur was the location of another genocide between 2003 and 2005. During the 2003 genocide, an estimated 200,000 civilians died from violence related to the conflict. Most victims of this previous genocide were members of the Fur, Masalit, and Zaghawa communities.

On 15 April 2023, a civil war began in Sudan between the Rapid Support Forces and the Sudanese army. As many as 400,000 people have been killed as a result of the conflict and 11 million have been displaced. The RSF itself was formed in 2013 from parts of the Janjaweed militia, which was responsible for the 2003 genocide.

== Events ==
=== Masalit genocide (2023) ===
Initial massacres targeted mainly Masalit communities in West Darfur between April and November 2023. In April 2023 all hospitals in Geneina, the capital of West Darfur, were rendered nonoperational due to the conflict, with many having reportedly been looted by RSF and allied militias after its capture. In the predominantly Masalit town of Misterei, at least 40 people were massacred by RSF fighters in early May 2023. Six other towns in West Darfur were also burned and destroyed. The governor of West Darfur, Khamis Abakar, was abducted and killed after accusing the RSF of genocide in Darfur.

By June 2023, over 20 neighbourhoods and all 86 shelters for the displaced in Geneina were destroyed, the city's market was also thoroughly looted and torched. Summary executions were reported in the Geneina area in June. Over 15,000 civilians were killed in the Geneina massacre in June, with several hundred more being killed in similar massacres in Misterei, Sirba, Konga Haraza, Tendelti and Murnei, among other villages. Hundreds of thousands of Masalit civilians were displaced into Chad. In November, thousands of non-Arab civilians (mostly Masalit, Tama and Erenga), as well as SAF prisoners were massacred by the RSF in Ardamata. Several villages around Tawila and Kutum in North Darfur, as well as rural areas in other Darfuri states also reported similar massacres. The Masalit genocide was spearheaded by the RSF, but many non-RSF Janjaweed groups, as well as Arab tribal militias also took part in the killings.

=== El Fasher siege and other developments (2024–2025) ===
In May 2024 the RSF tightened its siege of El Fasher, which was home to hundreds of thousands of non-Arab refugees. In April 2025, the Abu Shouk and Zamzam refugee camps outside of the city were attacked several times by the RSF and allied Arab militias, killing hundreds of people between April and August. In the aftermath of the fall of El Fasher to the RSF in October, tens of thousands of people, mostly non-Arab civilians (particularly the Zaghawa), were killed in the El Fasher massacre. About 500,000 people have fled El Fasher since the city fell to the RSF. Many RSF fighters were reported to be using Chinese-made drones to accelerate the speed of killings near the city. An estimated 200,000 civilians were trapped in El Fasher at the time of its capture, with many believed to have been systematically killed.

== Casualties ==
The death toll remains unclear. In 2023, an estimated 15,000 were killed during the Battle of Geneina and 2,000 internally displaced persons were killed in the Ardamata massacre. Following the capture of El Fasher in October 2025, the fate of an estimated 150,000 residents who remained in the city is unknown; British MPs were briefed that 60,000 killed is the low estimate for El Fasher alone.

In November 2025, a communications blackout in El Fasher was still limiting information. The Yale HRL estimated that the figures of those killed are "undercounted" and Sky News said that analysts estimate "tens of thousands" of individuals killed. Kholood Khair of the Khartoum-based Confluence Advisory think-tank estimated that 100,000 people were killed in the "genocidal violence" but noted that there were no official figures due to the lack of governance in the region.

== Responses ==
The massacres committed against the Masalit were recognized as a genocide by Genocide Watch and by Raoul Wallenberg Centre for Human Rights. On 6 December 2023, the US government said that "RSF and their allied militias committed crimes against humanity and ethnic cleansing in Darfur." The US government said in January 2025 that it determined the RSF committed genocide in Darfur. Eric Reeves, a US academic who has researched Sudan, described the RSF 2023 campaign against Masalit and the capture of El Fasher in 2025 as genocidal. According to the Sudan researcher Shayna Lewis, the RSF have a systematic policy of genocide.

According to the Yale University Humanitarian Research Lab, the actions of RSF in El Fasher in 2025 "may be consistent with war crimes and crimes against humanity and may rise to the level of genocide".

In 2026, a United Nations fact-finding mission to Sudan found that the RSF's campaign of violence against non-Arab minorities reported that “the mass killings and related atrocities committed by the Rapid Support Forces in and around El-Fasher, during its takeover of the city on or around 26 and 27 October 2025, are indicators of a genocidal path".

=== International Court of Justice ===
On March 6, 2025, the Sudanese government filed a case against the United Arab Emirates at the International Court of Justice accusing the United Arab Emirates of violating the Genocide Convention and being complicit in genocide and other crimes committed by the RSF on the Masalit. Sudan accused the UAE of enabling the RSF's attacks on Masalit communities by providing them with political, military and financial support, and asked the court to halt the UAE's supply of arms to the militia. The UAE denied the accusations. In an official statement, the UAE described the case as "a cynical publicity stunt". On 5 May 2025 the ICJ rejected the case, stating that it lacked jurisdiction to rule on the merits because the UAE had rejected it.

== See also ==
- Darfur genocide (2003–2005)
- 21st-century genocides#Sudan (2023)
- Human rights in Sudan
- List of ethnic cleansing campaigns
- List of genocides
- List of massacres in Sudan
- Politics of Sudan
- War crimes during the Sudanese civil war (2023–present)
