= April 2021 Geneina attacks =

Conflict between Arabs and Masalit in Sudan

- Part of Ethnic conflict in West Darfur
Date	April 3–8, 2021
Location	al-Jabal, al-Jamarik, Krinding, Al-Samaga, El Geneina, West Darfur, Sudan
Result	Inconclusive

Belligerents
Masalit self-defense groups	Janjaweed; Rapid Support Forces; Chadian Arabs

Casualties and losses
- 144 people killed, 233 injured

Between April 3 and 8, 2021, clashes broke out between Arabs and Masalit in El Geneina, Sudan following the killing on April 3 of two Masalit men on a road separating Arab and Masalit neighborhoods in Krinding. At least 144 people were killed and 233 injured in the clashes. The clashes were the second major conflict in Krinding in 2021, with ethnic clashes occurring in January as well that killed 163 people.

== Background ==
In mid-2020, the Juba Peace Agreement was signed between the Sudanese government and various rebel groups in Juba, South Sudan. The goal of the peace agreement was to end the War in Darfur and the systemic massacres against non-Arab groups in the region. The city of El Geneina, the capital of West Darfur, had been a flashpoint between Arabs and Masalit as the city was the home of the Masalit Sultanate, and many Arabs had migrated to the area in the decades prior. When the war in Darfur broke out after non-Arab groups disgruntled with the reign of Omar al-Bashir rebelled against the government, Bashir recruited Arab militias into the Janjaweed, which committed genocide against various non-Arab groups in Darfur. In 2013, many Janjaweed were recruited into the Rapid Support Forces (RSF), a government-backed paramilitary led by Rizeigat Arab Hemedti.

The Juba Peace Agreement facilitated the withdrawal of UNAMID and allowed Sudanese Army and RSF bases to pop up in Geneina. In 2019, the first attack by Janjaweed and the RSF took place against the Masalit in the Krinding camp of Geneina, and killed 72 people, mostly Masalit. Masalit self-defense groups began taking up arms after the attack, and helped defend the town of Misterei from a raid by Janjaweed in July 2020. These self-defense groups expanded into the Krinding IDP camp in Geneina, where attacks by Arabs were repulsed, sparking clashes that left 163 people dead and hundreds injured.

== Attacks ==
The casus belli of the attacks began on April 3, when two Masalit men were shot and killed and two others were injured by Arabs on the road that separates Arab and Masalit neighborhoods. A resident of Geneina who went to the funerals of the men stated that a hooded group of militiamen was watching. The resident stated it was "obvious that they were from the Arab militia. Clashes between Arab militiamen and Masalit self-defense groups began in Krinding later on April 3, and had spread into southern and southwestern El Geneina.

On April 4, Janjaweed backed by the Rapid Support Forces rallied more Arab forces from Zalingei, Saraf Omra, and Chad to Geneina to fight back against the Masalit. The clashes expanded to the Jabal and Jamarik areas of Geneina, which are predominantly populated by Masalits although segregated between Masalits and Arabs by block. Sudanese forces and police did not intervene in the clashes; one survivor of the attacks stated that some elements of the local and federal government were actively attacking the neighborhoods. Mohammed El Doma, the governor of West Darfur, stated that 300 Sudanese Army vehicles were stationed in El Geneina to quell the attacks. During the attacks on April 4, an armed man opened fire on an ambulance carrying staff to El Geneina Teaching Hospital, injuring two doctors. The heaviest fighting on April 4 was in Jabal between the Arab militias and Masalit self-defense groups. These battles were near the Sudanese Army garrison and the headquarters of the Central Reserve Police. Fighting had killed 120 people and hundreds of others injured by April 4.

On April 5, El Doma declared a curfew from 7 a.m. to 6 a.m. The next massive attack by Arab militias and the RSF occurred on April 6 at Abu Zar IDP camp and Al Sadaga IDP camp near Geneina. At Abu Zar, the Janjaweed and RSF shot indiscriminately at the refugees and looted their belongings. The militias also torched the camp, with satellite imagery showing a large portion of the camp burnt out. Environmental sensors confirmed that these raids and burnings continued between April 5 into the morning of April 8.

After five days of clashes, the fighting between Masalit and Arabs died down on April 7, Easter Sunday. That same day, Sudanese government forces began patrolling the streets of El Geneina. The pillaging of Abu Zar did not end until the morning of April 8.

== Aftermath ==
The general coordinator of IDP camps in West Darfur, Ahmed al-Sharif Ahmed, stated that the Sudanese government failed to protect civilians and was part of the problem. Ahmed said, "It is inconceivable that large groups of militias loaded with ammunition from inside and outside the state could spread chaos for three days without the government’s knowledge or ability to resolve the chaos, considering the various security forces, including military intelligence based in the city."

Refugees from the attacks fled into schools, universities, and hospitals after their neighborhoods were looted and burnt out. The World Food Programme launched a campaign to deliver food to the affected areas of El Geneina. At least 117 people were killed in the attacks, and over 283 injured. This number later increased to 144 killed and 233 injured. 84,855 people were internally displaced within El Geneina and West Darfur due to the attacks as well. Human Rights Watch reported that following the April 2021 attacks on El Geneina, openly separatist Masalit propaganda began spreading on social media. Masalit communities in El Geneina continued to militarize, a process spurred after the 2020 Krinding attack and 2020 Misterei massacre when Arab militias attacked. The militarization facilitated the arrival of Khamis Abakar's Sudanese Alliance, a Masalit militia.

== See also ==
- Battle of Geneina
- Dar Erenga
- Abu Suruj
