= Misterei massacre =

Mass killing in West Darfur during 2023 Sudan war

- Part of the Masalit genocide and the Battle of Geneina
- West Darfur highlighted in Sudan
- Location: 13°7′29.55″N 22°9′42.56″E; Misterei, West Darfur, Sudan
- Date: May 27-28, 2023
- Target: Masalit civilians
- Attack type: Mass murder, Massacre
- Deaths: 97 killed
- Injuries: 160 injured
- Assailants: Janjaweed and Rapid Support Forces
- No. of participants: ~300

Between May 27 and 28, 2023, armed Arab gunmen affiliated with the Rapid Support Forces attacked the West Darfur town of Misterei during the Battle of Geneina, killing 97 Masalit civilians after brief clashes with the Sudanese Alliance and Masalit self-defense groups, and destroying the town.

== Prelude ==
Throughout the war in Darfur, the town of Misterei has been a hub of violence between Arab tribes affiliated with the Janjaweed and Rapid Support Forces against non-Arab tribes, predominantly the Masalit, who live in Misterei. As a result of low protection by the Sudanese Army and UNAMID following the Juba Peace Agreement in 2020, Masalit self-defense groups formed in Misterei. The town was the site of a massacre by the RSF in 2020, which killed 42 Masalit and 18 attackers. After the massacre, Misterei banned Arabs from the town.

In March 2023, the Sudanese Armed Forces moved their base from Misterei to Geneina, the capital of West Darfur. When the Battle of Geneina intensified in May 2023, RSF militants began attacking Masalit civilians en masse in the town, with over a thousand people killed, many of whom were Masalit. As a result, the only force defending the town was the Sudanese Alliance led by West Darfur governor Khamis Abakar. On May 26, Masalit self-defense groups in the mountains of Misterei, who were defending against RSF attacks, clashed with Arab fighters on Dorondi mountain. A second self-defense group moved to Shorrong mountain nearby to add further protection.

On May 27, a battle broke out in Jabal Derindi, three kilometers away from Misterei, between Sudanese Forces and the RSF. Seventeen SAF soldiers were killed, and ten were injured.

== Massacre ==
Prior to the Misterei attack, a group of 300 RSF fighters and allied tribes surrounded the town on the night of May 27, with the exceptions of the south and west, where the fighters entered the town. The fighters came from the Arab tribes Awlad Rashid, Misseriya, and Awlad Janoob, led by Mohamed Zain Taj Eldien and Hamid Yousef Mustafa. Some of the assailants came from the Mima and Bargo ethnic groups. The attackers arrived in twelve Land Cruisers, eight of which were RSF-owned, four of which were private. Other fighters rode on around 150 horses and 140 motorcycles. Around 90 Sudanese Alliance militants, a signatory of the Juba Agreement, intervened in the town, led by Cpt. Elteybe Abdulla Ahmed. Residents were fearful following the surrounding of the town, but there was "no way out".

The first clashes began at Shorrong mountain right after sunrise, when Janjaweed launched an offensive from the west. Later offensives came from the north and south. The Janjaweed came in waves, according to a veteran of the attacks, and many of the self-defense groups were spread out across and around the town in groups of 7 to 15. The Masalit self-defense groups quickly fell to the Janjaweed. Battles between the Sudanese Alliance and the Janjaweed lasted for three and a half hours, during which civilians stated the Arab fighters went house to house, killing darker-skinned Masalit and shouting "Kill the slave, kill the slave!"

Wounded civilians were brought to the Atik mosque, although Janjaweed stormed the place and shot at the wounded and those attending to them. After killing several people, Arab fighters cheered "We killed the zorga! (a slur for black people)." The Janjaweed also looted houses, farms, and shops, before burning down many neighborhoods. The Misterei market was completely looted and torched. Satellite imagery taken on June 3 showed the entire town burnt down.

== Aftermath ==
Later in the day on May 29, remaining residents buried the bodies of slain civilians in Misterei. Around 80 bodies were buried in a mass grave, located by the Misterei hospital in the southeastern part of the town. The injured were taken to Adré or Abashi for treatment. The first mass grave contained fifty-nine bodies, mostly of men, and was done quickly due to fear of further Janjaweed attacks. In the following days, more bodies were buried, bringing the toll to 97 killed. 160 people were injured as well.

Nine hundred families that same day fled for Chad. Of the original population of 26,000, 17,000 had fled to the Chadian town of Gongour.

The RSF dismissed claims that they were involved in the massacre, referring to it as "a tribal conflict."

== See also ==
- List of massacres in Sudan
