= Mansour Arbab =

President of New Justice and Equality Movement
- In office August 24, 2015 – March 22, 2025
- Preceded by: Position established
- Succeeded by: Position abolished

Vice-Chairman of the Sudan Liberation Army
- In office 2004 – 2006 or 2009
- Succeeded by: Khamis Abakar

Personal details
- Born: Mansour Arbab Younis Omar Misterei, West Darfur, Sudan
- Education: Sudan University of Science and Technology; Cavendish University Uganda

Military service
- Allegiance: SPLA (2002–2003); SLA (2004–2009); JEM (2009–2015); New JEM (2015–2025); Sudanese Armed Forces (2025-present)
- Battles/wars: War in Darfur; Sudanese civil war (2023-present)

Mansour Arbab Younis Omar is a Sudanese engineer, professor, and militant who has served as the leader of the New Justice and Equality Movement (New JEM), also called the New Sudanese Justice and Equality Movement (NSJEM) since its split from the Justice and Equality Movement in 2015. Since 2025, he has allied with the Sudanese Armed Forces.

== Biography ==
Arbab is an ethnic Masalit from Misterei, West Darfur, Sudan. His brother was killed in the Geneina massacre in 2023. He is also an engineer, having graduated with a degree in electrical engineering from the Sudan University of Science and Technology. He also holds a bachelor's degree in international studies from Cavendish University Uganda, and a PhD from Inkomba University. In the early 2020s, he was a professor at several universities in Uganda.

He became involved with the rebel cause in the War in Darfur in the early years of the conflict, first joining the SPLA in 2002 or 2003. Between 2004 and 2006, he was vice-president of the SLA under Abdul Wahid al-Nur. In 2006, he co-founded the National Salvation Front alliance. In 2007, Arbab attended peace talks in Sirte, Libya with the SPLM. Arbab was a vice-chairman of the Sudan Liberation Army until 2009, when he defected to JEM and recruited a lot of Masalit. His successor as vice-chairman of the SLA was Khamis Abakar, who later defected and founded his own offshoot of the SLA. Arbab's cousin and an ex-SAF soldier, Siddiq Abdelkarim Nassir, was killed in a battle between the SPLA and a Fur faction of the SLA, inflaming Fur-Masalit tensions.

In May 2015, JEM leader Gibril Ibrahim dismissed Arbab, who was then serving as Secretary of Presidential Affairs, and Hudhaifa Mohi El-Din Mohamed as Secretary of Cultural Affairs. This came after both Arbab and El-Din issued a statement dismissing Ibrahim as President of JEM. Arbab and El-Din's statement appointed Arbab as the next head of JEM. Tahir al-Faki, another member of JEM, supported Ibrahim and rejected Arbab and El-Din's coup attempt. Ibrahim accused Arbab and El-Din's coup attempt as backed by the Bashir-led Sudanese government.

In August 2015, Arbab and El-Din defected and founded their own movement called the New Justice and Equality Movement or New JEM. On November 30, 2015, New JEM demanded that the African Union involve the group in peace talks with the Sudanese government; they reneged on this promise on December 10, but rejoined it anyway on December 21. In January 2016, NJEM took part in the peace talks.

In 2019, Arbab chaired a new alliance called the Sudanese Alliance for Change (SAC), composed of New JEM, the Revolutionary Forces Front, the Democratic Justice and Equality Movement, the Reform and Development Movement, and the Kordofan Development Alliance. In an interview with Salaamedia, he accused Gibril Ibrahim of being a roadblock to peace among rebel groups.

=== Post-War in Darfur ===
After the Sudanese revolution in 2019 that ousted Omar al-Bashir, Arbab and his NJEM group were not included in the Juba Peace Agreement talks. In February 2020, Arbab and the Abdallah Banda faction of JEM requested to participate in the JPA. Neither group was a signatory to the agreement.

In June 2022, Arbab took part in peace talks with forces from Musa Hilal's Sudanese Awakening Revolutionary Council and other smaller militias on withdrawing their troops from Libya. NJEM has That October, top members of New JEM defected and rejoined the Sudanese Youth Movement for Change and Justice.

=== Sudanese civil war ===
Upon the outbreak of the Sudanese civil war in 2023, Arbab was an outspoken critic of the Rapid Support Forces' genocide of the Masalit in Geneina. In July 2023, after his brother's murder by the RSF in Geneina, he called the RSF's actions a genocide. He visited refugee camps for Masalit in Chad shortly after the massacre, and urged international organizations to deploy more resources to the influx of refugees. In 2024, Arbab criticized the Addis Ababa Agreement between the RSF and Tagadum.

On March 22, 2025, Arbab announced his allegiance to the Sudanese Armed Forces to fight against the RSF. His group, New JEM, did not release a statement on joining the SAF. However, his group did privately make plans to integrate into the SAF. He said that he was initially planning on laying down arms and joining the SAF after Eid al-Fitr in 2023, but the outbreak of war on April 15, 2023, prevented that. According to Arbab, fighters from New JEM fought the RSF at Kreinik, Jebel Moon, Misterei, Geneina, and elsewhere. Eritrea has reportedly trained New JEM's fighters since 2025.
