= Al-Tijani Karshoum =

Sudanese tribal leader

Governor of West Darfur
- De Facto, Disputed (Note: Disputed with Bahr al-Din Adam Karama since 28 July 2024)
- Assumed office 31 June 2023 (Note: Acting from 14 June 2023 to 31 June 2023)
- Preceded by: Khamis Abakar

Deputy governor of West Darfur
- In office July 2022 – 31 June 2023
- Governor: Khamis Abakar

Personal details
- Born: Al-Tijani Al-Tahir Karshoum
- Occupation: Tribal leader, politician

Al-Tijani Al-Tahir Karshoum is a Sudanese tribal leader. As of 31 June 2023 he is the de facto governor of West Darfur. He previously served as deputy governor of the state since July 2022.

== Career ==
Karshoum is a member of the Mahamid tribe and is a Rizeigat Arab like Hemedti. His community is based in Al-Jabal, Geneina. The United Nations panel of experts on Sudan described Karshoum as a member of the Gathering of Sudan Liberation Forces, which had signed the 2020 Juba Peace Agreement. In July 2022 Karshoum was named deputy governor of West Darfur, under governor Khamis Abakar. During this period he also served as head of the state's security committee.

In the period May-June 2023 several witnesses stated they saw Karshoum during the Battle of Geneina with Arab tribal militiamen and Rapid Support Forces (RSF) forces and that he was instructing and rallying the forces. After the assassination of Abakar on 14 June, Karshoum first declined to become acting governor. After local leaders convinced him to become acting governor, with support of both the Sudanese Armed Forces and the RSF, he assumed the position on 31 June 2023. In the week after Abakar's death Karshoum together with RSF commander Abdul Rahman Jumma established a committee to gather and bury the bodies left after the battle.

In December 2023 the Federal Minister of Government dismissed Karshoum. Several hundred people protested in Geneina against the decision. In January 2024 Karshoum stated that schools in Geneina would be open again after months of closure. On 28 July 2024 the Transitional Sovereignty Council under Abdel Fattah al-Burhan, appointed Bahr al-Din Adam Karama as governor to replace Karshoum. Karama remained in Port Sudan however as the state of West Darfur was under control by the RSF.

On 16 December 2024 Karshoum was sanctioned by the European Union under Council Implementing Regulation (EU) 2024/3156, together with: Salah Abdallah Mohamed Salah, Mohamed Ali Ahmed Subir and Osman Mohamed Hamid Mohamed. They were added to an existing list of six individuals. On 5 March 2025 Karshoum was also subjected to sanctions by Canada under the Special Economic Measures Act. He was also sanctioned by Australia on 5 November 2026.

In April 2025 a counterterrorism court in Port Sudan started a trial in absentia against Karshoum and 15 others, charging them with the assassination of Khamis Abakar.

On 19 October 2025 two guards of Karshoum were killed and he himself was injured in a possible drone strike on the civil government headquarters of West Darfur.
