= Ardamata massacre =

2023 mass murder in Sudan

- Part of War crimes during the Sudanese civil war (2023–present), Masalit massacres (2023–present) and the Battle of Geneina
- West Darfur highlighted in Sudan
- Location: 13°7′29.55″N 22°9′42.56″E; Ardamata, Geneina, West Darfur, Sudan
- Date: 8 November 2023
- Target: Masalit people, Tama people, Erenga people
- Attack type: Ethnic cleansing
- Deaths: Between 800 and 2,000
- Injuries: 3,000
- Victims: 20,000 refugees
- Perpetrators: Janjaweed and Rapid Support Forces

On 8 November 2023, the Rapid Support Forces (RSF) and Janjaweed massacred between 800 and 2,000 in Ardamata, Geneina, West Darfur, Sudan – although estimates vary. The attack came after the Sudanese Armed Forces's 15th Infantry Division camp retreated to Chad between during 6-8 November. About 20,000 fled to Chad following the violence. Reports indicated ethnic targeting, mostly the Masalit community, but also members of other non-Arab groups, notably Tama and Erenga people.
