= Third Front =

Third Front may refer to:

- Third Front (China), development campaign to relocate national defense facilities and industry
- Third Front (India), a political alliance
- Tamazuj, also known as The Third Front, a rebel group in Sudan
