= Mass graves in Sudan =

Mass graves in Sudan are numerous documented and suspected mass burial sites identified in parts of Sudan, particularly in Darfur and South Kordofan. Investigations by the United Nations and humanitarian research organizations have used eyewitness accounts, satellite imagery, and other evidence to identify or corroborate suspected mass grave sites. Reports of mass graves have continued during the Sudanese civil war (2023–present), which began in April 2023 between the Sudanese Armed Forces and the Rapid Support Forces (RSF).

== Background ==
South Kordofan State has been the scene of intermittent fighting since South Sudan's independence in 2011. Tensions between the Sudanese Army (SAF) and the Sudan People's Liberation Movement-North (SPLM-N) have escalated due to territorial, ethnic, and resource control disputes. The Kadugli region has experienced mass displacement, bombing, and a critical humanitarian situation.

The Darfur Genocide is one of at least eight genocides currently taking place in the world, and although it is one of the most violent and brutal, it is also one of the least discussed. Being a journalist in Sudan is extremely dangerous, as multiple sources indicate that Rapid Support Forces (RSF) officers frequently detain and search women working for media outlets.

== El Fasher ==
According to Nathaniel Raymond, executive director of the Humanitarian Research Lab at Yale University, the Rapid Support Forces (RSF) are allegedly digging mass graves in El Fasher, Darfur. RS Forces have also supposedly started collecting bodies all over the city. Rapid Support Forces took control of el-Fasher on October 26, 2025, following the withdrawal of the Sudanese Army (SAF).

More than 70,000 individuals have left the city since the take over, an UN report claims, while human rights organizations and witnesses have alleged instances of "summary executions", sexual assault, and civilian slaughter.

A report from the Yale laboratory dated October 28 detected “evidence of mass murder” through satellite imagery, including “pools of blood visible from space”.

According to Jacqueline Wilma Parlevliet, a senior UNHCR official in Sudan, "the current insecurity continues to block access, preventing the delivery of life-saving assistance to those trapped in the city without food, water, and medical care."

== Reports ==
There is no official report of the victim count, nor of any exact locations, but organizations such as Yale School of Public Health have reported those mass graves and included proof.

Limited access to the area and the ongoing conflict make independent verification of the allegations difficult, making it much less well known than if it had happened elsewhere.
