= Abdul Rahman Jumma =

Sudanese soldier

Major General Abdul Rahman Jumma
- عبدالرحمن جمعة

Personal details
- Born: Abdul Rahman Jumma Barakallah Ahmad; 1 January 1969 (age 57) Ed Daein, East Darfur, Republic of Sudan
- Known for: Killing of Khamis Abakar

Military service
- Allegiance: Rapid Support Forces
- Rank: Major General
- Commands: RSF in East Darfur
- Battles/wars: War in Darfur; Sudanese civil war (2023–present); Battle of Geneina

Abdul Rahman Jumma (Arabic: عبدالرحمن جمعة, romanized: ʻAbd-al-Raḥmān Jumʻah, born 1 January 1969) is a Sudanese military officer and senior commander of the paramilitary Rapid Support Forces (RSF). He serves as the RSF commander in East Darfur, Sudan, and faced accusations of grave violations, including war crimes and genocide, in the Darfur region during the War in Darfur and the Battle of Geneina, including the assassination of Khamis Abakar, during the ongoing civil war in Sudan.

The Darfur Bar Association called for international prosecution and UN intervention in June 2023. Jumma's actions within the RSF sparked controversy due to their involvement in conflicts leading to unrest and displacement. In August 2023, the SAF's War Crimes Committee, led by Sudan's Transitional Sovereignty Council, listed Jumma among wanted individuals, emphasising crimes against humanity, war crimes, and genocide allegations.

In May 2024, the United States imposed sanctions on Jumma.

== Biography ==
Abdel Rahman Jumma Barak Allah Ahmad was born on 1 January 1969 (Note: Many Sudanese citizens born before 2000 might not have birth certificates, especially those from rural areas where such documents were unavailable at the time. To address this, individuals can get a confirmation from the Birth Registry stating that their birth is not recorded. They can then present this confirmation to the health commission to receive a substitute health document, which will indicate their age but not their place of birth. Typically, this document lists the date of birth as January 1st, with the estimated birth year.) in Ed Daein, East Darfur. He is a Major General of Rapid Support Forces (RSF), involved in the Battle of Geneina as the Commander of the Rapid Support Forces, West Darfur Sector.

Jumma was the RSF Commander in West Darfur and appeared in videos related to the arrest of the West Darfur governor, Khamis Abakar, before his killing, sparking accusations from the Sudanese army. General Jumma, as part of the RSF, has been involved in conflicts in the Darfur region, leading to significant unrest and displacement. Jumma's role within the RSF has attracted attention due to its controversial actions and their impact on the region.

In June 2023, the Darfur Bar Association called for human rights organisations to launch a campaign to criminally prosecute Abdel Rahman Jumma and Al-Tijani Al-Taher Karshoum, Deputy Governor of West Darfur, alleging grave violations against civilians, including war crimes and genocide. They are seeking intervention from the United Nations to halt these abuses. Jumma is also accused of preventing citizens from leaving El Geneina, and the West Darfur Revolutionaries Bloc condemns his statements about peaceful coexistence, pointing to his involvement in systematic violence and displacement against civilians. They argue that the conflict is not tribal but a systematic genocide perpetrated by militias and Rapid Support forces. The Association is pushing for international criminal cases, classifying the events in West Darfur as crimes against humanity, highlighting the need for justice and accountability.

In August 2023, the War Crimes, Violations, and Practices Committee of the RSF, established by the Chairman of the Transitional Sovereignty Council in Sudan, released a list of names of individuals deemed wanted for justice. Notable figures on this list include the RSF Commander Hemedti, his deputy Abdel-Rahim Dagalo, Jumma, and Al-Tijani Al-Taher Karshoum. This list comprises 46 individuals, including some tribal leaders. The committee, led by the Public Prosecutor, called for the surrender of these wanted persons. The committee's mandate is to investigate allegations of crimes against humanity, war crimes, and genocide attributed to the RSF, and it includes representatives from various government agencies and bodies.
