= Idriss Hassan =

Sudanese military officer

Idriss Hassan Ibrahim is a Sudanese brigadier general and part of the Rapid Support Forces (RSF). He has served as commander of the RSF in West Darfur.

== Early life ==
Hassan is a member of the Rizeigat tribe. Under the presidency of Omar al-Bashir Hassan was involved in putting down a rebellion by non-Arabs in Darfur during the first decade of the 2000s. In May 2021 he served as brigadier general and commander of the RSF in Geneina. In this capacity he accused parties not signatory in the Sudanese peace process of violence in Geneina. In 2023 the Battle of Geneina took place. Several witnesses stated they saw Hassan in May in RSF uniform supervising forces during the battle.

In December 2023, as RSF commander of West Darfur, Hassan held talks with representatives of the Justice and Equality Movement on the situation in West Darfur.

In September 2025, Hassan announced plans to attack the border town of Al-Tina in North Darfur.
