= Hamid al-Tijani Hanoun =

Sudanese politician

- حامد التجاني هنون

Governor of South Darfur
- In office 2022 – November 22, 2023 (per Sudanese Armed Forces)
- Preceded by: Musa Mahdi Ishaq
- Succeeded by: Bashir Mursal (de jure, per SAF); Ahmed Barakatallah (per RSF)

Personal details
- Born: Mohammed Hamid al-Tijani Hanoun

Mohammed Hamid al-Tijani Hanoun is a Sudanese politician who served as acting governor of South Darfur from 2022. In late 2023, Hanoun allied himself with the Rapid Support Forces as the group captured the South Darfur capital of Nyala, and was subsequently dismissed as governor in November 2023 by the Sudanese army. Since June 2024 Hanoun has been de jure replaced by Bashir Mursal.

== Biography ==
Hanoun's political career began in July 2020, when he was appointed Secretary-general of the South Darfur government and also a representative of the South Darfur governor. The governor of the state, appointed in July 2020 by the Transitional Sovereignty Council after the Sudanese revolution, was Musa Mahdi Ishaq. Hanoun was also referred to as "acting governor" of South Darfur in December 2020. During 2021 clashes between Fulani and Rizeigat civilians in Gireida, Hanoun announced that the Rapid Support Forces paramilitary would be deployed to maintain order in the area.

News organizations in Sudan began referring to Hanoun as governor, or wali, of South Darfur around early 2022. There was no government statement declaring Hanoun as governor, nor was there one dismissing Mahdi as governor. A March 2022 article by Darfur24 showed a photo of Hanoun sitting at the governor's desk in Nyala, the photo being dated December 2021. As de facto governor, Hanoun visited Bilel in December 2022, which was the site of tribal clashes between Daju and Rizeigat tribes.

On April 12, 2023, three days before the start of the full-scale Sudanese civil war, Ahmed Suleiman, a commander in the RSF, accused Hanoun of being responsible for an unstable security situation in Nyala and South Darfur. Suleiman accused Hanoun of being stingy and not cooperating with the RSF.

=== Sudanese civil war ===
Hanoun was relatively silent during the war in Sudan that began in April 2023 despite Nyala, the capital of South Darfur, being the site of a months-long battle between the Sudanese Army and Rapid Support Forces. A journalist from Nyala said on April 18 that Hanoun formed a committee to take the bodies of young fighters off the streets. During the Geneina massacre, Hanoun offered to mediate between Masalit self-defense groups and the RSF on May 2. In September, Hanoun traveled to El Fasher to suggest that North Darfur governor Nimir Mohammed Abdelrahman could replicate peace talks in Nyala.

In November 2023, Sudanese Army commander Abdel Fattah al-Burhan dismissed Hanoun as governor of South Darfur. His replacement on paper, Bashir Mursal, was not named until June 2024. On December 6, 2023, two months after the fall of Nyala to the RSF, the Rapid Support Forces published statements claiming Hanoun praised the RSF for "maintaining peace and stability."

In April 2024, despite Musa Mahdi being the de jure governor despite fleeing Nyala at the start of the war, RSF general Ahmed Barakatallah seized the duties of the governor.
