= Shukri, Sudan =

Village in West Darfur, Sudan

Shukri, Sudan شيكرى
- Village
- Country: Sudan
- State: West Darfur
- City: Geneina
- Control: Rapid Support Forces
- Time zone: Central Africa Time, GMT + 3

Shukri is a village in West Darfur, Sudan. It is located on the road between Geneina and Adré, across the border in Chad, 10 kilometres (6.2 mi) from the border.

== History ==
Shukri has been heavily impacted by the Sudanese civil war. As result of the Battle of Geneina, many refugees have left Shukri for Chad.
