= Tendelti, West Darfur =

Village in Sudan

Tendelti تندلتي
- Location in Sudan
- Coordinates: 13°40′18.44″N 22°7′59.02″E
- Country: Sudan
- State: West Darfur
- City: Geneina
- Elevation: 827 m (2,713 ft)
- Time zone: Central Africa Time, GMT + 3

Tendelti (Arabic: تندلتي), or Tandalti or Tandaltī, is a village located 42 kilometres (26 mi) northwest of Geneina, Sudan.

== History ==
Massacres have been reported in the village during the Battle of Geneina.

== Demographics ==
The village is home to mainly ethnic Massalit residents.
