= Battle of Geneina =

Major battles and massacres of the Darfur campaign of the Sudanese civil war

- Part of the Sudanese civil war (2023–present) and Darfur campaign
- The market of Geneina after being torched in late April.
Date	Battles: 15 April 2023 – 14 June 2023 (1 month and 30 days); Massacre: 14 June 2023 – 22 June 2023 (8 days)
Location	Geneina (and surroundings), West Darfur, Sudan 13°27′N 22°27′E
Result	RSF victory

Belligerents
Masalit self-defense groups Sudanese Alliance; West Darfur Police: Sudanese government; Sudanese Armed Forces; Darfur Joint Protection Force	Rapid Support Forces; Janjaweed and Rizeigat Arab fighters Tamazuj; Chadian mercenaries Central African mercenaries

Commanders and leaders
Khamis Abakar (executed) (Governor of West Darfur and founder of Sudanese Alliance); Abdel-Baqi al-Hassan Mohammed † (Deputy Commander of West Darfur Police); Sultan Saad Bahr el Din (Sultan of Masalit)	Abdel Rahman Jumma (Leader of the RSF in West Darfur); Massar Abdelrahman Assil (Emir of Rizeigat Arabs); Al-Tijani Al-Tahir Karshoum (Deputy Governor of West Darfur); Musa Angir (Leader of Tamazuj in El Geneina); Idriss Hassan (Former leader of RSF in West Darfur); Hafiz Hassan (Emir in Native Administration)

Units involved
15th Infantry Division	Unknown

Strength
2,000	16,000

Casualties and losses
- 5,000+ civilians killed (between 24 April and 24 June); Up to 15,000 people killed (UN report); 370,000+ refugees
- Location within Sudan

The Geneina massacre, also the Battle of Geneina, was a series of major battles for control of Geneina, the capital of West Darfur in Sudan, between the paramilitary Rapid Support Forces (RSF) and allied militias against Masalit self-defense militias. The battles primarily lasted between April 24 and June 14, 2023, with major attacks and massacres by the RSF and allied militias on Masalit civilians in the city. After the killing of West Darfur governor Khamis Abakar on June 14, thousands of Masalit civilians were slaughtered in the city between June 14 and June 22 by the RSF and allied militias.

Initial clashes broke out on April 15 between the RSF and Sudanese Armed Forces (SAF) but dissipated by April 20. Fighting had devolved along tribal lines following attacks on Masalit neighborhoods by the RSF and allied militias, with Masalit civilians taking up arms and forming self-defense militias alongside the Sudanese Alliance with some SAF backing against Arab and non-Masalit Janjaweed militias backed by the RSF. (Note: These militias primarily consisted of Janjaweed, consisting of Rizeigat Arabs, but also included non-Arab fighters in Tamazuj and Chadian and Central African mercenaries.)

Janjaweed and RSF fighters overran Masalit resistance in April, with the militias slaughtering and torching Masalit neighborhoods and IDP camps. Bodies of Masalit civilians were piled up in the streets from April to June during the genocidal campaign, and thousands fled to the Sudanese army garrison at Ardamata and towards the Chadian border. The killings of civilians ramped up in mid-June following the killing of West Darfur governor Khamis Abakar (an ethnic Masalit). The RSF and Janjaweed captured the entirety of Geneina by June 22, eliminating all pockets of resistance in neighborhoods they had captured on June 14.

Renewed clashes broke out in Ardamata and Geneina in early November 2023, as RSF and Janjaweed militias stormed the Sudanese Army garrison where thousands of civilians sought refuge from the massacres earlier that year. Over 1,000 civilians and soldiers were massacred following the capture of the garrison.

== Background ==
=== War in Darfur ===
In 2003, war broke out in western Sudan's Darfur region between the government-sponsored, predominantly Arab Janjaweed militia aided by the Sudanese Armed Forces against the predominantly non-Arab Sudan Liberation Movement and Justice and Equality Movement, after SLM and JEM launched attacks against the Sudanese government and accusing them of genocide.

On 25 March 2003, the rebels seized the garrison town of Tine along the Chadian border, seizing large quantities of supplies and arms. The rebellion began partially due to feelings of marginalization among Zaghawa, Fur, and Masalit civilians in Darfur following Arabization campaigns carried out by President Omar al-Bashir. In response, Bashir mobilized Arab civilians into militias called Janjaweed who conducted a genocide of non-Arab civilians through scorched earth campaigns. In 2013, the formation of the Rapid Support Forces (RSF) led by Hemedti, a Rizeigat Arab, began conducting operations against the rebel groups. The RSF was known for its brutality against civilian areas sympathetic to the rebels.

El Geneina, as the capital of West Darfur, saw an extensive amount of violence, due to its location as the sultanate of the Masalit people. The city had a population of 250,000 in 2008.

In 2020, the war came to an end after several rebel groups signed a peace treaty with the Sudanese government following the Sudanese Revolution and the ousting of Omar al-Bashir.

=== Attacks on Geneina (2019–2023) ===
Despite the Juba Peace Agreement ending the War in Darfur and the UNAMID peacekeeping mission, Geneina and surrounding areas were attacked by the RSF and Janjaweed between 2019 and 15 April 2023. The first attack was on December 31, 2019, at the Krinding IDP camp, killing 101 people. The camp was attacked again in January and April 2021, several months after UNAMID withdrew, killing 150 and 144 people respectively. After the January 2021 attack, Masalit civilians gained weapons and started forming self-defense militias, leading to sit-in protests on the roads leading to Geneina by Arab civilians.

These attacks on IDP camps and Masalit-dominated areas in and around Geneina continued into 2022, with a massacre in Kreinik killing over 200 people. The SAF and international monitors rarely intervened in these attacks, and the RSF categorically denied involvement. In 2022, both Masalit and Arab militias, including the Sudanese Alliance and RSF, began a massive recruitment campaign along tribal lines in all of Darfur.

=== Demographics of Geneina ===
Neighborhoods in Geneina were often mixed between majority-Masalit, majority-Arab, mixed Arab and Masalit, and mixed Arab and non-Arab groups such as Tama, Bargo, and Zaghawa. Many non-Arab and non-Masalit groups immigrated to the city as refugees within the past twenty years as refugees in the War in Darfur. The al-Jamarik and al-Madariss neighborhoods were predominantly Masalit and the al-Tadhamun neighborhood was home to the Masalit sultanate and other prominent Masalit figures. The al-Naseem and Um Duwein neighborhoods were predominantly Arab.

The largest neighborhood in Geneina, al-Jabal, was mixed with blocks 1 to 3 being Arab and blocks 4 to 7 were Masalit. al-Kifah, al-Shati, al-Imtidad, and al-Salam neighborhoods were mixed between Arabs and non-Arabs, with the latter three being home to wealthier traders. There is no map defining exact borders of neighborhoods.

== Prelude ==
=== West Darfur ===
Geneina was considered strategic due to its location as the capital of West Darfur and the center of the Dar Masalit sultanate. The city housed 540,000 civilians pre-war. (Note: The population as of September 2023 is estimated at around 160,000, after the confirmed deaths and fleeing of former Geneina civilians. Most of the population now consists of unemployed adults as the city continues to be occupied by the Rapid Support Forces.) In late March and early April 2023, clashes between Arabs and non-Arabs in Geneina, Foro Baranga, and Tendelti prompted West Darfur governor and Sudanese Alliance founder and commander Khamis Abakar to declare a state of emergency in the region and a nighttime curfew on April 10. The clashes in Foro Baranga were between the Tama and Arabs, and left 24 people dead and 24,000 displaced.

=== Khartoum ===
Tensions between Abdelfattah al-Burhan, the military leader of Sudan who took power in the 2021 Sudanese coup d'état and Hemedti intensified in early 2023 over Hemedti's resistance to integrating the RSF into the Sudanese Armed Forces and Burhan's resistance to transitioning into civilian rule. These tensions erupted into war on April 15, when RSF fighters stormed Khartoum International Airport and other Sudanese Army bases across the country. The SAF was able to eliminate rebellions at RSF bases in the eastern and southern parts of the country, namely Kassala, Sennar, and Blue Nile State, while the RSF recruited Janjaweed to storm and isolate Sudanese forces in Darfur and Kordofan. Much of Khartoum and surrounding cities of Omdurman and Khartoum Bahri became a warzone.

== Battle ==
=== Initial clashes (15–17 April) ===
The battle in Geneina broke out on 15 April 2023, and took place in the western outskirts of the city. The initial clashes lasted for an hour and a half, according to a Masalit tribal leader, and ended at noon. Civilians began sheltering in their homes, and the Masalit leader stated the situation in the city was "turbulent and unstable". Clashes continued into the next day, but little is known about them. The Rapid Support Forces claimed late in the night of 16 April that they had captured the Geneina Airport, but this was impossible to verify at the time. A nationwide ceasefire, originating in Khartoum, also failed to hold up in Geneina on 16 April.

By 17 April, Geneina's main hospital had closed due to the fighting. At the time, the death toll and exact location of fighting in Geneina were impossible to verify due to fog of war. While some sources stated fighting broke out between the SAF and RSF, others claimed clashes were actually between Arabs and the non-Arab Masalit. Ahmed Gouja, a journalist in Nyala, corroborated the claims of the Arab-Masalit clashes, and that civilians had stolen weapons from the police station to protect themselves and their neighborhoods. In the first days of clashes, Sudanese forces also opened up their armories and distributed 400 weapons to Masalit self-defense groups and the Sudanese Alliance. OCHA reported that UN offices were being looted in the city, and markets, homes, and offices of other humanitarian organizations were being torched. On 23 April, SAF soldiers attempted to recapture parts of the city from the RSF, but were pushed back into the army headquarters.

On April 22, civilians in Geneina reported hearing rumors of RSF and Janjaweed leaders mobilizing in Shukri, a village on the road between Adré and Geneina. These mobilizations moved to Geneina and surrounding neighborhoods until the 24th, when Janjaweed and RSF fighters began setting up positions around Geneina. Around this same time on April 23, community elders and SAF officers convened to seek an end to the conflict. In a statement intended to be released on April 24, the attendees concluded that the SAF and RSF should refrain from fighting in Geneina, and that reserve police forces would be deployed to the market in the city that had been closed since April 15.

=== Clashes turn to massacres (April 24 – May 2) ===
From 24 to 25 April, clashes intensified starting in the al-Jamarik neighborhood. In the al-Jabal neighborhood, Arab militiamen attacked the headquarters of the joint Sudanese-Chadian forces and stole about eleven armored vehicles. Arab militiamen also attacked municipal and state organizations, including the town's police headquarters, market, and bank. The RSF then attacked the majority-Masalit neighborhoods and IDP camps of al-Madariss, al-Mansoura, and al-Tadhamun, along with the Central Market and aforementioned al-Jabal and al-Jamarik neighborhoods. These incursions were led by the RSF's commander in West Darfur Abdel Rahman Jumma. RSF fighters deliberately targeted areas that civilians gathered at, including government offices and Zahra girl's boarding school. In targeting neighborhoods, the militias and RSF went door to door in every building, and torched larger buildings such as schools. Masalit men of all ages were targeted by the militias, and women were raped and hunted.

As the RSF and Janjaweed attacked Masalit-majority neighborhoods, thousands of Masalit civilians headed towards former UNAMID bases, police stations, and SAF outposts searching for weapons to defend themselves. Many police who were Masalit themselves opened the armories further to civilians, leading to some resistance at the SAF bases that was overrun as the bases were stormed and looted by Masalit civilians. One resident of al-Jamarik stated "From that day forward, everyone had a gun." In a massacre at the Labor Office in a Masalit-majority neighborhood, at least thirty-one civilians gathered there were killed.

The fighting on 25 April began when Sudanese Alliance fighters attacked RSF bases in El Geneina. Volker Perthes, the UN representative to Sudan, released a statement that day claiming that tribal leaders in El-Geneina restarted mobilization campaigns. Perthes also stated militias from Central Darfur and North Darfur were joining fighting in El-Geneina. The Darfur Bar Association stated that 25 people were killed on 25 April alone, and thousands of refugees had fled to Chad. The UN's OHCHR claimed over 96 people were killed. The Deputy Police Director of West Darfur, Brig. Gen. Abdel-Baqi al-Hassan Mohamed, was killed in the fighting as well. There was no power and hardly any telecommunication in Geneina after 24 April.

Residents of El-Geneina claimed they saw "pick-up trucks full of dead people". One resident, speaking to the BBC, claimed RSF soldiers burnt down all refugee camps in and around the city, and that fighters were attacking houses with rockets. Community leaders in the city also stated that gunmen attacked displaced refugees in the center of the city, including the Abu Zar refugee camp. Médecins Sans Frontières released a statement claiming that the El Geneina Teaching Hospital was looted by militants on 28 April, and the organization deplored the looting. Many hospitals closed due to being looted, while ambulances and paramedics were frequently attacked. The few hospitals that remained open in late April and early May reported a lack of blood for transfusions and concomitant equipment, intravenous fluids and general medical supplies. Yousra Elbagir, in an interview, stated that UN offices evacuated foreign nationals in the city but left behind Sudanese nationals. On 27 April, RSF militants launched a large attack on Masalit positions in the city. Around 6 am, heavy fighting broke out in the al-Majlis neighborhood, and quickly spread across the municipal headquarters of the city, according to the Dar Masalit Union. These clashes continued into 28 April, and fighting was fierce in all neighborhoods of Geneina. By 1 May, the death toll in El Geneina had risen to over 180 civilians killed, with one doctor estimating over 191 killed. The UN reported that by 10 May, over 450 people had died in the fighting, and between 7,500 and 12,000 sought refuge in the SAF military base in Ardamata.

Clashes had paused by 2 May, after intervention by tribal administration leaders and South Darfur governor Hamid al-Tijani Hanoun paused fighting between the RSF and SAF in the city. The truce did not account for tribal divisions, and was consequently shaky. Afterward, the only hospital working in the city was Kreinik Hospital, as the El Geneina Teaching Hospital was decrepit and the city's Ministry of Health was torched. Almost every market, with the exception of a few smaller ones in the north of the city, were either ransacked or abandoned, causing hyperinflation on the cost of goods. Most residents sought refuge in the al-Salam neighborhood, which had not been heavily affected in the fighting.

=== Third round of attacks (May 12–15) ===
Fighting broke out a third time on 12 May, after Janjaweed and aligned militias attacked civilian militias near Zalat Street. The Sudanese Doctors' Syndicate stated that the death toll of the attacks was 280 killed and over 160 wounded, with that number due to rise as fighting continues. On 14 May, the neighborhoods of al-Buhaira, al-Thawra, al-Tadhamun, al-Majlis, and al-Madariss were attacked. In an attempt to alleviate the fighting, West Darfur governor Minni Minnawi announced the creation of a "Joint Darfur Force" composed of the rebel movements that signed the 2020 Juba Peace Agreement. The Sudanese Women of Change organization, based in Darfur, called the situation in El Geneina a "Rwandan genocide scenario". Around this time, there were several IDP camps that had been entirely torched and destroyed. Local hospitals and activists reported dozens of injuries and bodies coming in every day, many being gunshot wounds to young men by RSF and allied attacks on their camps.

By 16 May, residents in El Geneina stated that the internet was only available during the day and that power outages, food shortages, and water shortages were continuous. Civilians who took up arms stated that the fighting was extremely intense, and many neighborhoods launched civilian patrols that worked 24-hours a day to combat the RSF attacks. In the fighting, the city's main imam, Muhammad Abdel Aziz Omar, was killed.

They're [RSF] just shooting everywhere. If you go outside, you'll be killed. You can't move, even 200 or 300 metres."

— Mohammed Ibrahim, civilian patrol,

During the renewed outbreak of fighting, there were times when there were no functioning hospitals in Geneina. The West Darfur Doctor's Union stated that 280 people were killed and over 300 injured between 12 and 15 May. Following the fighting, satellite imagery showed several schools, businesses, and neighborhoods burnt out due to the clashes. The Sudanese Doctors Union had reported around 200 dead with hundreds injured by May 17, with civilians by then stating that conditions on anything in the city had worsened in the past few days. Around this time, there was no power and little food and water. By 21 May, all displacement and refugee camps in Geneina were burned down. Several residents interviewed by Reuters stated that RSF and Arab militiamen would occupy homes, and recalled instances were seven members of a family were killed in their house, and twelve injured people and a doctor were gunned down in a makeshift hospital. After 21 May, communications blacked out in Geneina and much of Darfur region. While the city was quiet for the most part, RSF and allied militiamen fully captured all of al-Jamarik neighborhood between May 21 and 23. Surviving Masalit defenders and Sudanese Alliance fighters withdrew to six other neighborhoods along the main A5 road, and used the General Secretariat as their headquarters.

=== Siege of El Geneina (24 May–22 June 2023) ===
==== Fleeing and entering El Geneina ====
On 24 May, an SLM-MM (Note: The Sudan Liberation Army wing loyal to Minni Minnawi.) source in the Joint Darfur Force announced that a JDF convoy headed to Geneina, backed by the Sudanese Armed Forces, was ambushed by RSF troops and aligned Arab militias. Four JDF troops were killed, seventeen were injured, and three were captured, although the convoy was able to make it into Geneina. In late May, attacks took place along the outskirts of Geneina, with RSF-aligned militias attacking the towns of Misterei and Kulbus. Most refugees from Geneina and its surroundings, which by late May numbered 370,000 people, fled to the city of Adré, in eastern Chad. Chadian authorities also set up refugee camps in Abdi, just across the border from the Sudanese town of Beida. The Abdi camp held 25,000 refugees in the first weeks of creation. Many civilians were unable to go across the border, due to RSF control of the road linking Chad and El Geneina.

RSF checkpoints were numerous along the A5 road connecting Adre to Geneina. Masalit and other non-Arab groups were targeted, with RSF and Janjaweed fighters accusing them of having attacked Arabs in the city. These fighters often executed and beat up refugees fleeing to Chad, and the few Masalit that were let through were called "slaves" and ordered never to return to Darfur. When survivors entered Adre, the refugee camps were overpopulated and there was not enough food and medical equipment to go around. Many refugees died in Chad.

“The [RSF] asked us if El Geneina is an Arab place or is it for the Masalit ... if you answered ‘Masalit’ you would be killed directly. Every checkpoint could be your last.”

— Juma Dawood, refugee,

==== Medical shortage in the city ====
By 4 June, all hospitals in the city were closed due to the fighting. Communications were still blacked out, although the Internet worked briefly in the city on 1 June. Médecins Sans Frontières stated that by June, it was impossible to collect bodies of dead civilians and soldiers, and that many bodies were either left in the streets or piled up in one place. The only two functioning markets left in the city were the El Zariba and El Ardaiba markets. Hassan Zakariya, the head of one of two working field hospitals in Geneina, stated 880 people had been killed between April 24 and June 9.

On 5 June, Abdelkaleg Arbab, a lawyer working for the Darfur Bar Association, was killed along with eight members of his family during an attack on his house in the El Shati neighborhood, and another lawyer named Mohamed Ahmed Kodi was killed in an attack. The Darfur Bar Association stated that Arbab and Kodi were killed for their work in prosecuting war crimes against internally displaced refugees from the War in Darfur. Several other prominent lawyers and human rights defenders were killed that same day in El Geneina.

==== Targeting of journalists and activists ====
RSF forces attacked southern and eastern El Geneina on 7 June, after gathering forces from other cities in West Darfur. The clashes lasted until 9 June. Two survivors of an attack by RSF and allied militias on al-Gandoul center, where 200 families were sheltering, stated that 30 RSF militants entered the complex and began shooting indiscriminately. These shootings were directed by Tamazuj commander Musa Angir, who had been spotted commanding other attacks on civilians since April 24.

On 6 June, West Darfur deputy governor El Bukhari Abdullah stated 850 people were killed and over 2,000 injured since fighting broke out in the city on 15 April. This number increased to 1,100 total people killed, according to local doctors in the city. One of the most prominent journalists in the city, Enaam El Nour, was abducted by unknown perpetrators in early June. By mid-June, El Geneina was under a near-complete siege by the RSF and allied Arab militias. Many Masalit civilians remaining in the city attempted to flee west towards the Chadian border or north to the SAF base in Ardamata.

=== Killing of Khamis Abakar and the June massacres ===
Killing of Khamis Abakar
- Part of the 2023 Sudan conflict
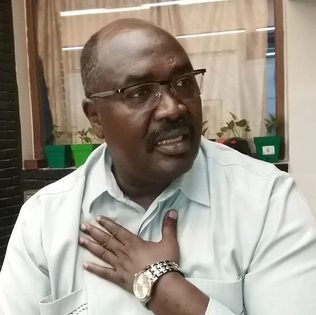
- Khamis Abakar in 2021
- Location: Geneina, Sudan
- Date: 14 June 2023
- Target: Khamis Abakar (Governor of West Darfur)
- Attack type: assassination
- Perpetrator: Abdel Rahman Jumma (RSF)

On 14 June, an RSF shelling of the al-Jamarik neighborhood killed seventeen civilians, including relatives of the Dar Masalit sultan. One of the relatives killed was Dar Masalit emir Tariq Abdelrahman Bahlredin. 37 others were wounded in the attack. West Darfur governor Khamis Abakar denounced the situation as a genocide on 13 June and stated the Sudanese Army was not leaving the army base to help civilians. In response, the RSF called the battle of El Geneina a "tribal conflict". On 15 June, Abakar was tortured and executed by RSF militants led by Abdel Rahman Jumma for his statement two days prior. The RSF blamed Sudanese forces for Abakar's killing, despite video evidence showing RSF soldiers assaulting Abakar and celebrating with his body. Masalit activists stated Abakar was killed after he refused to retract his statements about genocide in El Geneina. The head of the New JEM, Mansour Arbab, accused Jumma of the killing of Abakar, along with the Joint Darfur Force. Minni Minnawi, leader of the JDF, deplored the killing but did not accuse the RSF. Later, the UN High Commissioner for Human Rights deplored the killing.

That same day, many neighborhoods held by remaining Masalit self-defense groups and Sudanese Alliance fighters fell to the RSF and allied militias after a massive attack by the militias. Thousands of civilians fled toward Chad and Ardamata, forming large convoys. On the morning of June 15, RSF and allied militias attacked the convoy and slaughtered hundreds of fleeing civilians, forcing some to attempt to swim across the Kaja River towards Krinding to dodge the bullets. At the same time, RSF and allied militias began going house to house in formerly Masalit-controlled neighborhoods, killing anybody in them. Civilians were shot at as they fled the RSF in the streets. At least 547 people were killed between June 14 and 15 alone, and 1,400 people were injured. Snipers prevented people from leaving their houses. One survivor stated that Janjaweed fighters lined him and several men against a wall and asked them which ethnic group they were. Those who said Masalit were shot.

=== RSF capture and end of the massacre ===
On 22 June, the Darfur Bar Association reported that El Geneina had "fallen to the RSF", citing reports from Sudanese refugees on the Chadian border. The association claimed that despite a small garrison of Sudanese Army forces holed up in the city, the RSF, led by Jumma, were in control of the region and its surroundings. The last remnants of the SAF garrison, consisting of the 15th Division, fled Geneina on 4 November. They left hundreds of troops and large amounts of weapons behind; their escape marked the final victory of the RSF in Geneina. The remaining anti-RSF forces in and around Geneina subsequently disintegrated, either also fleeing or being captured.

== Genocide allegations ==
=== Allegations of genocide during the El Geneina massacre ===
On 13 July 2023, a UN investigation discovered a mass grave of 87 individuals, all Masalit civilians, near Geneina. The civilians were killed by the Rapid Support Forces between 13 and 21 June. Many of the dead were from al-Madariss and al-Jamarik neighborhoods. Volker Türk, the UN High Commissioner for Human Rights, deplored the killings and stated that the UN was not allowed access to the site until July.

During an attack on 19 June 2023, emir Badawi Masri Balhredin, cousin of the Dar Masalit sultan, was killed by the RSF. Several other prominent people were killed in attacks on 19 and 20 June, including Sadig Haroun, the Commissioner of Humanitarian Aid in the city, and several mayors and imams. The Darfur Bar Association reported the next day that the refugee camps of Kreinik and Sirba were under siege by the RSF. All makeshift shelters and refugee camps had been burned down by 20 June. Numerous villages, neighborhoods, and cultural sites in and around Geneina were destroyed, including the city's Grand Market and the palace of the Masalit Sultanate.

On 22 June, the Dar Masalit Sultanate also released a statement claiming more than 5,000 civilians had been killed between 24 April and 24 June, the majority of whom were non-Arabs. The Sultanate called the situation a "genocide", and footage emerged of corpses being used as barricades, and the bodies of men, women, and children strewn across the streets. Refugees from West Darfur speaking to Al Jazeera in late June corroborated these claims, adding that similar situations unfolded in the West Darfur towns of Misteri, Konga Haraza, and Tendelti between April and June. The RSF also attacked civilians in June on the road between Geneina and the Sudanese-Chadian border. Many of these killings were at RSF checkpoints, where a pregnant woman was killed by militiamen for not having enough money for passage. A Geneina refugee stated that "the road along El Geneina and Adré has a lot of bodies, nobody can count them". Another source claimed over 350 people were killed on the road alone.

While Masalit people were often the target of Arab militiamen, refugees claimed the militiamen shot at anyone black. Prominent civil society members, including lawyers, humanitarian officials, and more, were targeted by militias and the RSF after and during the fall of the city. The Darfur Bar Association called the ethnic cleansing "a full-scale genocide". The United Nations released a statement on 24 June deploring "wanton killings", but did not mention perpetrators. An officer at the UNHCR office in Adre stated that the RSF intentionally killed men and boys to "[eliminate] future fighters as well as the line of ancestry of a specific ethnic group."

==== Destruction and looting of property ====
Thousands of homes, primarily of Masalit residents, were looted and burned during and after the massacre. The entirety of the Abu Zor refugee camp was destroyed by June 21, with not a single building left standing. The destruction of homes first occurred on a mass scale in al-Jabal neighborhood in late April and early May, but expanded to al-Jamarik, al-Madariss, al-Tadhamun, and al-Majlis by mid-May. At its peak, the mass burning of homes occurred in the aforementioned neighborhoods, al-Thawra, Dunkey 13, and across the river in Krinding IDP camp. Janjaweed and Arab militiamen also looted shops of Masalit owners in the city's Central Market, although occasionally targeted wealthy Arab shops as well.

==== Mass graves ====
The RSF and allied militias prevented civilians from burying the dead. The first burials began on April 24 in the cemeteries at al-Ghabat, al-Shati, and al-Zariba. At least sixty-five bodies were laid in a mass grave in al-Ghabat between April 25 and 26. Tareq Bahreldin, the brother of the Masalit sultan, was killed by the RSF or allied militias after Bahreldin refused to leave the neighborhood he was defending. His body lied in the street for weeks until the fighting ended, at which point the RSF forced Bahreldin to be buried in a mass grave.

On 12 August, a representative of the Masalit tribe, El Farsha Saleh Arbab Suleiman, gave a press conference in Port Sudan in which he accused the RSF of seeking to conceal evidence of crimes committed in Geneina by burying bodies in hidden locations and forcing the Sudanese Red Crescent Society (SRCS) to hand over bodies. The Coordination of Resistance Committees confirmed the reports of the mass graves and said that, as of 16 August, several bodies were still on the roofs of houses or inside buildings. More than 1,000 bodies were found in 30 more mass graves on August 15. In an interview with AllAfrica, Masalit civilians in Adré recounted their experiences in the city, including the killing of a large group of displaced Masalit civilians within the city. Masalit Sultan Saad Bahar el-Deen stated around 10,000 people from his community were killed by the RSF. In CNN interviews on August 16, which included photos collected while the massacres were occurring, the last count of killed civilians was 884, and after June 9, it became uncountable, and that the town was a "ghost town". Civilians also stated that young Masalit children were massacred by the RSF. The RSF and Janjaweed also captured and tortured prominent activists or leaders that had been targeted from a viral WhatsApp message circulating among Arabs. One activist stated that he had been tied up and thrown into the Kajja river, and only untied when an Arab woman saved him.

The RSF and allied militias began taking phones from civilians in the process of burying or dumping the bodies from the massacre. The RSF forced the bodies to be loaded onto trucks and dumped in Al Torab Al Ahmar, an area on the outskirts of the city. 87 people were buried in Al Torab Al Ahmar. The bodies were also dumped in trenches on the outskirts of the city. Some residents, almost all women, came back to El Geneina to bury their relatives in al-Ghabat cemetery. These burials took place in late June, and the bodies were dumped in mass graves weeks after they had been killed.

Photos from the massacre showed several bodies in a pile in an abandoned and destroyed road in Geneina. A civilian stated that "bodies littered the street from Geneina Teaching Hospital to the southern parts of the city." Civilians who fled Geneina in July stated many bodies had been dumped in ponds in the area of Maragibir, a town west of Geneina. They stated that some of these bodies appeared to have been dead for months and that two groups of tribes had been killed or "practically exterminated" by the RSF, those being the Masalit people and the Burgo tribes. Others added that the RSF would use volunteers and civilians to take these bodies down, especially in the northern suburbs of the city. Thirteen more mass graves were discovered on September 14 in Geneina.

=== Perpetrators ===
==== Abdelrahman Jumma Barakallah ====
Several prominent RSF and Arab commanders spearheaded the genocidal campaign in Geneina. The RSF commander in the city was Abdel Rahman Jumma, who directed the attacks and assaults by RSF and Janjaweed on Masalit-controlled neighborhoods since the start of the battles. Jumma had ordered the bombardment of various areas of the city, including al-Madariss neighborhood and Al Hojaj IDP camp, both of which were eventually destroyed. A survivor of the massacres who fought in self-defense groups stated that Jumma did not personally engage in any of the attacks, but oversaw many of them. Jumma also ordered the killing of Abakar on June 14 with videos showing Abakar being dragged into Jumma's office. The United States sanctioned Jumma for his role in the massacres at Geneina and the killing of Abakar in September 2023.

==== Idriss Hassan ====
Former RSF commander of West Darfur Idriss Hassan also participated and led the assault of Masalit neighborhoods in Geneina. Several witnesses speaking to Reuters stated that Hassan commanded RSF and Janjaweed militants in their assault on the al-Jabal neighborhood. Like Jumma, Hassan only supervised the troops and did not engage in any fighting himself.

==== Al Tijani al-Tahir Karshoum ====
Karshoum was appointed deputy governor of El Geneina under Abakar in 2022, and was seen mobilizing Janjaweed in the days leading up to April 24, 2023. Karshoum was also spotted leading Janjaweed assaults on al-Madariss and Abu Zor IDP camp, along with being seen alongside Hassan in al-Jamarik. In al-Madariss, Karshoum ordered Janjaweed fighters to fire upon the governor's office located in the neighborhood. He was also present blocking a convoy of Masalit refugees fleeing the city on June 15. He also worked alongside Jumma in planning and committing the murder of Abakar on June 14. Abakar and Karshoum were in bad standing with each other due to Karshoum's pre-war dismissal of the West Darfur director of the Ministry of Finance, who supported Abakar. Karshoum was appointed as de facto governor of West Darfur in July. In July 2023, Karshoum led the assault and massacre of Sirba. By September, Karshoum was attempting to entice refugees to return to Geneina.

==== Musa Angir ====
Angir served as the commander of an Arab-dominated militia in Tamazuj, and conducted several attacks on civilians and civilian sites during the massacres at El Geneina. Like Jumma and Hassan, Angir led Tamazuj militants through al-Madariss neighborhood and ordered assaults on other neighborhoods of Geneina although did not participate in attacks himself. During the attack on the al-Gandoul shelter, Angir pointed at the building and stated, "I don't want any shelter center," immediately preceding the assault.

==== Massar Abdelrahman Assil ====
Assil serves as the leader of the Native Administration of West Darfur and as emir of Rizeigat tribes. Assil was responsible for mobilizing Janjaweed and Rizeigat militias in the leadup to the massacre on Geneina and distributed weapons to the fighters in mid and late April. Assil denied being responsible in the massacres of Masalit, and told Reuters and The Guardian that the Masalit had started the conflict and claimed that thousands of Arabs were killed in the massacres instead.

==== Hafiz Hassan ====
Hafiz Hassan serves as the representative of the Misseriya to the Native Administration, and coordinated the distribution of weapons to RSF and Janjaweed militants. Hassan also prevented the burial of bodies of Masalit civilians in Gharbat cemetery.

== Aftermath ==
El Geneina was the first state capital to fall to the RSF and allied militias since the war in Sudan began on April 15. The RSF and allied militias had besieged other cities throughout Darfur since the start of the war, including the South Darfur capital of Nyala, the Central Darfur capital of Zalingei, and the North Darfur capital of El Fasher. Nyala and Zalingei were held by the 16th Infantry Division and the 21st Infantry Division respectively, which were headquartered in the cities. On October 26, the RSF stormed the SAF garrison in Nyala and massacred the soldiers, seizing control of the city. Five days later on October 31, Zalingei fell. The fall of Nyala served as the tipping point to the fall of cities across Darfur to the RSF.

=== Ardamata massacre ===
The SAF's 15th Infantry Division had remained headquartered in Ardamata throughout the Geneina massacre and did little to relieve the atrocities or fight back against the RSF during its pillaging of the city. Many Masalit men and families fled to Ardamata and by November, thousands of refugees were living at the garrison. SAF soldiers remaining in the garrison, fearing an impending attack as one of the last area with Sudanese soldiers for hundreds of miles, began negotiating for their surrender with local elders.

The RSF and allied militias attacked Ardamata on November 2, breaching the refugee camp the next day and killing thousands of Masalit men. SAF soldiers fought back briefly, with shelling killing some civilians. When the RSF and militias broke into the SAF headquarters, the soldiers fled to Chad and left refugees to be killed. At least 1,335 mostly-Masalit refugees were killed, and 2,000 were injured. Among the killed and injured were also ethnic Tama and Erenga.

The RSF began bringing in Arabs from across the state and other parts of Sudan to repopulate El Geneina following the massacre. Some Arabs came from Chad, Niger, and other countries in the Sahel.

== See also ==
- April 2021 Geneina attacks
- List of massacres in Sudan
- Dar Erenga
- Abu Suruj
- El Fasher massacre
- Gezira State canal killings (2024–2025)
