= Native administration =

Sudanese governmental form

Native administration is the formal institution of traditional systems of governance used in Sudan. This form of administration is primarily used in rural areas, especially among nomadic or semi-nomadic people. Through this system, various formal powers are given to traditional leaders, complementing existing informal influence among their communities, and sometimes relatively large economic power.

The formal native administration system was adapted from pre-existing practices by the British administrators of Anglo-Egyptian Sudan. This was part of a policy of indirect rule, which was considered cheaper and more effective than direct administrative control. The system was maintained following independence, although it has become weaker over time as various governments brought previously tribal responsibilities into central government control.

The system has faced criticism since the colonial period, being seen as a tool of divide and rule then, and as an impediment to national unity since. However, its usefulness in providing effective administration in rural areas, as well as its link to political popularity, has led it to be co-opted in varying forms by successive Sudanese administrations. Systems based on native administration have in some cases been established in urban areas, to manage the influx of internally displaced people.

== System ==
There are three tiers of governance, with paramount chiefs presiding over omdas, who preside over sheiks. Paramount chiefs can be referred to by a number of titles, including nazir, sultan, melik, and shartai. In some cases, other layers of government can exist between nazir and omda. Some areas may have different names for each position.

Native administration, also known as "traditional leadership", is a clientilist system, with leading families controlling land and resources. Many chiefs also held religious power. Some leaders in the east and north were representatives of the Khatmiyya movement, and many in the west were part of the Ansar movement (associated with descendents of the dynasty that ruled the Mahdist State). Some native leaders became clients of others, creating a hierarchical system led by a paramount chief. All paramount chiefs were theoretically equal, although the power and wealth of their chiefdoms varied.

Native administration is an important element of governing nomadic populations. A nomadic lifestyle is common in rural Sudan, and many live somewhere on a continuous spectrum between nomadic and settled. The links to nomadic communities and the understanding of the land and natural resources means they play important roles in resource allocation, settling disputes, and handling relations with neighbouring groups. Native administration also plays a key role in providing communication channels between nomadic communities and outside bodies, such as aid organisations.

A system similar to native administration emerged in the Omdurman neighbourhood of Al-Hilla Al-Gadeeda. Originally a squatter settlement populations by internally displaced people (IDP), the area was revitalised starting in 1997 under the leadership of Abdulla Kafi. Squatters from different tribes organically organised into small groups with their own leaders, who became seen as similar to sheiks, with Kafi being the paramount chief. An omda is appointed by Kafi for groups of roughly 200 people. These omdas form a council, and sit on an informal native court. This system works with the recognition of the central government, with the formal Sudanese administration having little presence in the area. This system was replicated in other IDP camps.

Native administration has come under criticism since its use by the British. The empowering of tribal leaders was viewed as a divide and rule tactic to dull nationalist identity and sentiment. The tribal identity that is reinforced by native administration has been associated with civil conflict in the country. Today, the system is seen as providing limited recognition of women's rights. Criticism has sometimes led to native administration being successively weakened and at one point abolished. However, it has survived and, in some cases, has been partially revived, due to its utility as an administrative tool and as a means of imposing central government authority.

== History ==
=== Early basis and British rule ===
Native administration stretches at least back to the Funj Sultanate, and was continued during Ottoman-Egyptian rule. The system was ended by the Mahdist State in 1885, under which Tribal leaders became ordinary citizens. The system was restored under Anglo-Egyptian Sudan, becoming a facet of British indirect rule. Following the conquest of Darfur from Ali Dinar in 1916, the British maintained the area's existing administrative structure.

Early British administrators faced the challenge of building a new administrative structure following the collapse of Mahdist administration. The initial administration was very direct, with district commissioners reporting to provincial governors, who in turn reported to the central administration. Political unrest following the First World War led to the Milner Commission, which recommended administering through local institutions "as far as possible". British policy shifted to reflect on this, establishing tribal chiefs under the district commissioners. Influential British administrators such as Lord Lugard, Lord Hailey, and Sir Donald Cameron were proponents of indirect rule through native administration, which was seen as effective and cheap. Inspiration was sought from other areas, such as Northern Nigeria and the Raj of Sarawak. The system was opposed by some Sudanese, who viewed the system as establishing local puppet institutions that might forestall national political movements.

The native administration system was established throughout Sudan, although it was stronger in rural areas than urban areas. The administrative functions of native leaders came with formal executive and judicial powers, and some control over local resources. Statutory powers varied by tribe. A system of native courts accompanied this, allowing minor judicial cases to be handled through customary law. The court system was developed over time, before being finalised in the Native Courts Ordinance of 1932. In 1937, Local Government Ordinances were put in place, which encouraged the delegation of powers from governors to local representative governments. Tribal chiefs were often part of municipal and town councils, and such councils gained increasing formal power, albeit under the continuing supervision of a smaller number of district commissioners.

A new survey by the British government took place in 1948, and in 1949 advised the British government to further reform local government in Sudan broadly along the lines of local government in Britain, enhancing local autonomy and reducing or eliminating district commissioners. The existence of tribal chiefs complicated this potential system, and so it was advised that tribal authority be split from local authorities. A new system was put in place through the Local Government Act of 1951, under which the separate native administration fell under the authority of local government councils. In some cases these newly formed councils had effective control, while in others powerful native leaders maintained de facto control.

=== Independent Sudan ===
The monetisation of the rural economy saw many native leaders, especially in the centre and north, become large landowners. Tribal chiefs gained national political power following the Second World War, as politicians worked with chiefs to gain the support of their followers. The Democratic Unionist Party became associated with representatives of the Kahtmiyya movement, while the National Umma Party became associated with the Ansar movement. Parties without tribal support, such as the Sudanese Communist Party and the Muslim Brotherhood, were unable to gain a foothold in rural areas. The Communist Party worked with the People's Democratic Party (a temporary offshoot of the Unionist Party linked to the Khatmiyya movement) from 1964 to 1967 in part to gain rural support.

Many more educated urbanites or leftist politicians viewed the combination of executive, judicial, and economic power in a single person as undemocratic. While the native administration system was thus not popular among the urban elite, the reliance of national political parties on tribal leaders for political support meant that many post-independence governments did not attempt to dismantle it. The October 1964 Revolution, which saw a civilian government replace the Abboud military regime, attempted to eliminate native administration. The government passed a resolution on the matter, however elections followed shortly after and the new government did not implement the policy. Interference from the central government nonetheless continued, especially in the native court system, diminishing the effectiveness of tribal leaders and separating roles which had previously been consolidated under tribal leaders.

The establishment of the Democratic Republic of the Sudan under Jaafar Nimeiry following a military coup led to the dismantling of all political parties. In January 1971, the native administration system was formally abolished, and tribal chiefs and their relatives were excluded from participating in local government.

In the northern areas of the country, all that remained of native administration in the new local government system was the position of village sheikh. This position became that of an employee of the Ministry of Local Government responsible for local tax collection, and was selected by the bureaucracy instead of through traditional means. The People's Local Government Act of 1981 linked the new local government system to a new system of regional governments.

To some extent the native administration system was maintained in border regions and the restive Southern Sudan Autonomous Region, to maintain security. In the south, the new link between tribal chiefs and the central government weakened native authority, removing its effective influence over an often-rebellious population.

The elimination of native administration created a power vacuum in many rural areas. Former tribal leaders often retained informal influence, and some, such as the nazir of the Shukriyia tribe, encouraged the non-collection of taxes. Tax revenue declined by around 20%, reaching as high as 50% in some areas, despite increases in land value and the domestic animal population. The new local governments required central government subsidies to maintain their budgets, increasing central government influence and reducing local autonomy. Tensions also rose as some formerly subsidiary chiefs sought to take advantage of the situation and eliminate the influence of former nazirs.

In the Darfur, Eastern, and Kordofan regions, high levels of nomadism (together they contained around 60% of all of Sudan's nomadic people) enabled tribal authority to persist past its formal abolishment. Such leadership structures were important during the 1983-1985 Sudan famine. This led governments of the three regions to re-establish the system under the name "self administration". The Kordofan region officially designating nomadic leaders as administrative assistants (Muawin Zduri), and allowing village sheikhs to elect a mayor (omda) by at least 1986. In Darfur, new administrative structures were established in April 1985 replacing the previous system. This new system included "self administration" representatives at each level. The Eastern region looked to re-establish the entire native administration system through a 1984 law. Political issues meant nazirs were not reinstated, although omdas and sheikhs were. (Similar efforts did not arise in the more urban Central and Northern regions.)

The Transitional Military Council established after the 1985 Sudanese coup d'état saw the abolishment of People's Local Government Councils. Military governors in various regions thus sought to reassert authority through native administration, although such efforts were disconnected local initiatives.

The 1986 Sudanese parliamentary election saw tribal chiefs wield significant influence in turning out voters for political parties. The resulting coalition government of the Democratic Unionist Party and the Umma Party declared that it sought the reestablishment of the native administration system. This was to take place not only in border areas, but also in smaller towns and even areas previously not under a native administration system. To link it to democratic principles, the system called for the election of tribal chiefs rather than their appointment, and said chiefs would have clear official responsibilities and serve as employees of the state. During this period, many tribal leaders were elected to the National Assembly of Sudan.

The involvement of the National Islamic Front in the 1989 Sudanese coup d'état led to attempts to reform native administration along what was seen as more Islamic lines. Native administration was seen as too important for control and influence in rural areas to abolish, so in 1992, the Ministry of Social planning, led by Ali Osman Taha, brought forward a policy under which paramount chiefs were renamed "Amirs" and trained to spread Islamic theology. Native leaders retained judicial powers, but lost tax powers.

Famines and civil war led to an increasing number of internally displaced people (IDP) settling in the urban capital. In 1995, a new policy saw a modified native administration system implemented in state of Khartoum, which contained the capital, mainly to manage immigrants from areas such as Darfur and Kordofan. This "native system" lacked the territorial jurisdiction of native administration. The new name was intended to differentiate it from the native administration system, while keeping it similar enough for new migrants to understand. All leaders within the system were members of the ruling party, and expected to generate turnout for regime political rallies. A similar system was also put in place for informal neighbourhoods, especially the IDP camps that emerged around the capital's outskirts.

The War in Darfur which began in 2003 weakened native administration in the area. Many traditional leaders became displaced, and newer leaders lacked familiarity with the area and people. Returning traditional leaders created conflict with newer leaders. This diminishment of native authority was raised by tribal leaders as a reason for an increase in lawlessness. The traditional practice of providing 10% of harvests to native leaders in the area has stopped. The rise of different sorts of conflict resolution has also taken a traditional aspect of power away from native leaders in the region, as has the rise of youth organisation who view the native administration system as dated.

The association of native leaders with the central government led to tensions following the 2018–2019 Sudanese Revolution. New groups, such as those representing women and the civil resistance, provided alternative sources of political credibility. Some sheiks in IDP camps viewed as corrupt were replaced by their population to try and reduce tensions.
