= Tamazuj =

Rebel group in Western Sudan

The Third Front
- Logo of The Third Front
- Leader: Mohamed Ali Kurashi
- Dates active: 2020–present
- Active regions: Sudan (Border regions around Chad, Central African Republic, and South Sudan)
- Wars: Sudanese civil war (2023–present)
- Website: Youtube and Twitter

The Third Front (Arabic: الجبهة الثالثة, romanized: al-Jabhah al-Thālithah), known as Tamazuj (تمازج), is a claimed rebel group based in the Darfur and Kordofan regions of Sudan.

== Etymology ==
The name Tamazuj came from the Juba peace agreement, in which the Darfur was divided to six different groups. One of the groups was named Tamazuj (تمازج) corresponding to the border regions of Darfur and South Kordofan.

== History ==
Apparently formed during the leadup to the Juba Peace Agreement for the purpose of signing the agreement as a rebel group, the Third Front/Tamazuj was widely accused of being inserted into the process by the government of Sudan as a false rebel group. It claimed to be a former part of the SPLM-N rebel group, but this was denied by both major factions of that group. A UN investigation found that the Third Front / Tamazuj was possibly led by Arab militiamen who had served under Riek Machar in both the Second Sudanese Civil War (as part of the SPLA) and the South Sudanese Civil War (as part of the SPLA-IO), having spent the time between those two wars as part of the Popular Defence Forces (PDF), a paramilitary group under the government of Sudan. They were said to have been allowed to join the peace process at Machar's urging.

Tamazuj was one of the signatories to the Juba Peace Agreement signed in October 2020, after which it grew quickly in strength and power, recruiting new fighters from Darfur and opening offices across Sudan. In 2021, they won two seats in the legislative council, including the head of a parliamentary committee and a commission.

On August 17, 2023, Tamazuj declared its formal alliance with the Rapid Support Forces (RSF) in the ongoing conflict against the Sudanese Armed Forces. On March 12, 2023, Tamazuj stormed a police station in Khartoum, believing the security forces there assaulted one of their leaders. According to the group, a group of police officers had severely beaten a Tamazuj general Hussein Jaqud Wadi and broken his leg in an apparent dispute over the seizure of one the groups vehicles. In retaliation, the group stormed the station and freed the arrested general and his bodyguards.

Tamazuj is reportedly present in border areas with Chad, Central African Republic and Sudan. 4 of June, 2024 United Nations accused Tamazuj of recruiting children and using them as child soldiers. UN also supported the release of 122 children which were recruited by Tamazuj.

On 28 August 2025, Ali Kurashi announced that his forced had "changed equation" and that they would join the SAF to fight against the RSF. Kurashi accused the RSF of forming a government based on tribal frameworks, instead of through institutions and organizations.
