= Konga Haraza =

Village in Sudan

Konga Haraza كونقا حرازة
- Location in Sudan
- Coordinates: 12.92940°N 21.90214°E
- Country: Sudan
- State: West Darfur
- City: Geneina
- Time zone: Central Africa Time, GMT + 3

Konga Haraza (Arabic: كونقا حرازة) is a village located 100 kilometres (62 mi) southwest of Geneina, West Darfur, Sudan, near the Chad–Sudan border.

Since the 1950s, Kango Haraza has been one of the gathering points for cattle grazers from northern and southern Darfur and Chad, particularly from January to July.

In March 2009, a Sudanese aid worker was shot and killed in Kango Haraza. As of September 2019, it hosted an internally displaced persons camp, according to the United Nations High Commissioner for Refugees. Following the breakout of the war in Sudan in April 2023, thousands of people fled Kango Haraza and crossed into Chad.

The village gained prominence due to the conflict in the Darfur region, where violence and displacement forced many residents to flee.

Massacres have been reported in the village during the Battle of Geneina. As of May 2023, there are numerous reports discussing the flight of refugees from Konga Haraza due to fighting and violence in the region. The conflict in Darfur led to a humanitarian crisis, with many fleeing their homes in search of safety and stability in neighbouring areas. Reports indicate that Konga Haraza witnessed attacks by Rapid Support Forces and Arab militias, contributing to the displacement of its residents and the influx of refugees into other regions.
