= Awlad Rashid =

Tribal clan in Sudan

The Awlad Rashid tribe (Arabic: أولاد راشد) is an Arab clan, a part of the Rizeigat tribe, located in South Western Sudan in the Darfur region, particularly around the Marra mountain range and the surrounding plains. As a southern tribe in the Darfur region, they typically herded and raised cattle instead of camels as many northern tribes. They are involved with the other clans of the Rezegiat tribe in conflicts in the Darfur region and are associated with the Rapid Support Forces, and Janjaweed before them.

== Conflicts ==
On November 9, 2022, clashes erupted between the Misseriya and Awlad Rashid clans of the Rezeigat tribe near Juguma in Central Darfur’s Bendasi locality after the theft of a motorcycle and murder of its owner in the town of Jaqma. An estimated 15,000 people fled Juguma to Tuktuka and at least 48 people were reportedly killed and 17 injured. In retaliation to the mediators sent to the area to calm the situation on November 12, 2022 gunmen attacked resulting in the death of 24. A day after in an attempt to avoid escalation the Mayor of Central Darfur State declared a state of emergency for one month and imposed a curfew from 18:00 to 06:00.
