= Khamis Abakar =

Former Governor of West Darfur killed by the RSF (1964-2023)

Khamis Abdallah Abakar
- خميس عبد الله أبكر
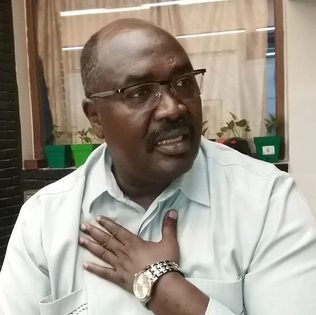
- Abakar in 2021

Governor of West Darfur
- In office 13 June 2021 – 14 June 2023
- President: Abdel Fattah al-Burhan
- Preceded by: Mohammed Abdalla Aldoma
- Succeeded by: Abdel Rahman Jumma (de facto)

Personal details
- Born: 30 March 1964 West Darfur, Sudan
- Died: 14 June 2023 (aged 59) El Geneina, West Darfur, Sudan
- Cause of death: Execution
- Party: Sudanese Alliance and Sudan Liberation Movement/Army
- Occupation: Politician, military officer
- Perpetrators: Abdel Rahman Jumma (RSF)

Military service
- Allegiance: Sudan Liberation Movement/Army (2003–2020); Sudanese Armed Forces (2020–2023)
- Years of service: 1996—2023
- Rank: General
- Battles/wars: War in Darfur; 2023 Sudan conflict †

Khamis Abdallah Abakar (Arabic: خميس عبد الله أبكر; 30 March 1964 – 14 June 2023) was a Sudanese politician, marginalized groups rights activist and former army commander who served as the Governor of West Darfur from 2021 until he was kidnapped and executed by the Rapid Support Forces paramilitary group in 2023 during the Geneina Massacre.

Prior to being governor, Abakar headed a faction of the Sudanese Liberation Movement, which fought the Sudanese military and Janjaweed (later the Rapid Support Forces) during the War in Darfur. In 2020, Abakar's faction of the SLM signed the Juba Peace Agreement, and Abakar was appointed Governor of West Darfur a year later.

== Early life and War in Darfur ==
Abakar took part in the war in Darfur in 2003, rising to the position of vice-president of the Sudan Liberation Army (SLA), along with being the leader of Masalit soldiers in the group. In 2006, Khamis Abakar was cited by Human Rights Watch during his time as a commander in the Sudan Liberation Army for forcibly conscripting Masalit refugee teenagers from Chadian refugee camps. Sometime in 2006, a faction of the SLA led by Abakar split off from the SLA during peace talks in Asmara. This sect of the SLA allied with other rebel groups that same year to create the short-lived Allied Revolutionary Forces of Western Sudan.

In 2011, Abakar's faction of the SLA rejoined Abdulwahid al-Nur's faction of the SLA.

== Governor of West Darfur ==
Following the Sudanese Revolution in 2020, almost all rebel groups signed the Juba Peace Agreement, including the Sudan Liberation Movement, which Abakar was still a part of. In an attempt to cement the peace, interim prime minister Abdalla Hamdok appointed several former militia leaders to governor positions in Darfur. On 13 June 2021, Abakar was appointed governor of West Darfur, replacing Mohammed Abdalla Aldoma. In July 2021, just a month into Abakar's term, Hemedti, the commander of the Rapid Support Forces, encouraged Abakar to use former SLA soldiers to break up ethnic clashes in the West Darfur capital of Geneina that broke out in April that year. Abakar also attempted to alleviate tribal clashes in the remote Jebel Marra in November 2021. Throughout Abakar's governance, several more deadly tribal clashes broke out between 2022 and 2023.

== Death ==
When the 2023 Sudan conflict broke out, Abakar sided with the Sudanese Armed Forces (SAF). The Rapid Support Forces launched attacks on Masalit civilians during their siege on the city of Geneina, including members of Abakar's family. Abakar narrowly escaped an assassination attempt when unidentified armed individuals opened fire on his vehicle on 28 April. Confidential informants with knowledge of the incident informed Al Jazeera that the alleged assailants were reportedly associated with the RSF.

On 14 June, an RSF shelling of the El Jamarik neighborhood killed seventeen civilians, including relatives of the Dar Masalit sultan. One of the relatives killed was Dar Masalit Emir Tariq Abdelrahman Bahlredin. 37 others were wounded in the attack. Khamis Abakar denounced the situation as a genocide on 13 June, and stated the Sudanese Army was not leaving the army base to help civilians. In response, the RSF called the battle of El Geneina a "tribal conflict".

On 14 June, Abakar was kidnapped, tortured and executed by alleged RSF militants, led by Abdel Rahman Jumma. The RSF blamed Sudanese forces for Abakar's killing, despite video evidence showing RSF soldiers assaulting Abakar. Masalit activists claimed Abakar was killed after he refused to refute his statements about genocide in El Geneina. The head of the JEM, Mansour Arbab, accused Jumma of the killing of Abakar, along with the Joint Darfur Force. Minni Minnawi, leader of the JDF, deplored the killing but did not accuse the RSF. Later, the UN High Commissioner for Human Rights deplored the killing.

On 20 April 2025, a trial in absentia was started by the government of Sudan against Hemedti and his brother Abdul Rahim Dagalo for the killing of Abakar.
