= Misterei =

Village in West Darfur, Sudan

Misterei مستري
- Location in Sudan
- Coordinates: 13°7′29.55″N 22°9′42.56″E
- Country: Sudan
- State: West Darfur
- City: Geneina
- Time zone: Central Africa Time, GMT + 3

Misterei (Arabic: مستري) is a village located south of Geneina, Sudan.

== History ==
On 25 and 26 July 2020, a massacre occurred involving around 500 gunmen who attacked Misterei killing more than 60 people.

Massacres have been reported in the village during the 2023 Sudan conflict with the village being used during the Battle of Geneina for massacres and for the battle overall.

== Demographics ==
The village is home to mainly ethnic Masalit residents.
