= Sudanese National Alliance =

Political party in Sudan

Sudanese National Alliance (SNA) is a Sudanese political party. Formed in 1994 as a democratic, secular, non-regional party, the SNA was one of the four original members of the National Democratic Alliance, the coalition of Northern groups and the Sudan People's Liberation Movement in opposition to the al-Bashir government in Khartoum. From the beginning, former general Abdel Aziz Khalid was the visible leader of the SNA, although Amir Babakr was the SNA chairman. During the 1990s, the Sudan Alliance Forces, the armed wing of the SNA, conducted a number of low-level military attacks against Sudanese forces inside the country. The Sudan Alliance Forces merged with the Sudan People's Liberation Army in 2002. Subsequently, the SNA joined the political process in Khartoum. Khalid ran as the SNA candidate for president in the April 2010 election and received 0.34 percent of the vote.
