= Juba Peace Agreement =

2020 agreement between Sudan and rebel groups

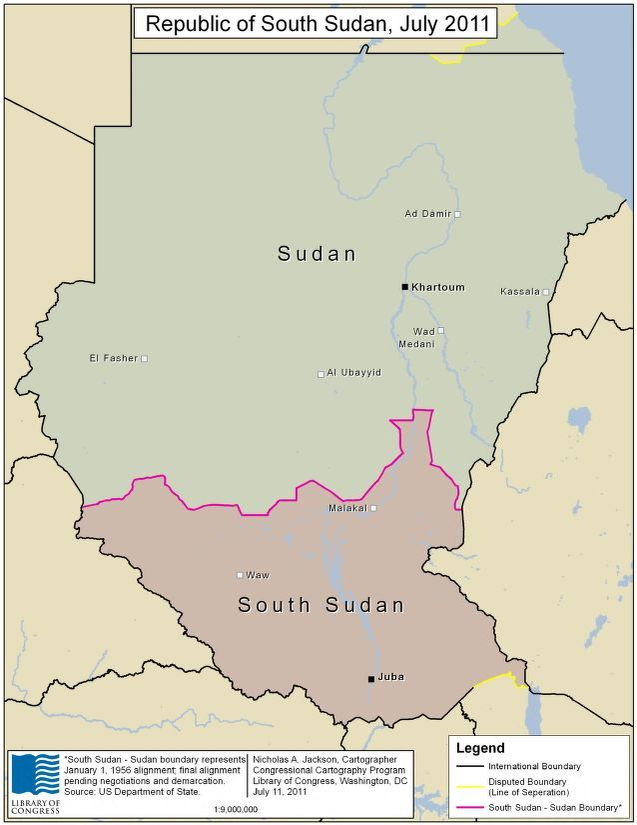
Map of Sudan and South Sudan

Signed on October 3, 2020, the Juba Peace Agreement (also called the Juba Agreement) is a landmark concord between Sudan's transitional government and a handful of the country's rebel groups. Since Sudan gained its independence in 1956, the nation has been plagued by various civil wars and internal conflicts, namely the War in Darfur (2003–2020). Nearly 400,000 people died in the crisis and over 2.5 million were displaced due to the fighting between rebel groups within the region, which prompted the implementation of peace-building legislation after nearly two decades of conflict. The Juba Peace Agreement served to amend the 2019 Constitutional Charter in Sudan, which is the most recent in a long line of unsuccessful legislations put in place to equalize the power dynamic between civil government and military/armed force rule.

== Agreement Protocols ==
=== Power Sharing ===
The primary protocol outlined in the Juba Peace Agreement directly relates to the practice of federalism in Sudan and South Sudan. The general principles of the agreement range from establishing Sudan is a sovereign state for its people to denouncing violence as a political practice. This section also places a heavy emphasis on the ethnic diversity of Sudan, and stating that power-sharing among these groups is necessary for democratic governance.

As for the more specific protocols outlined, this section of the agreement claimed the entire document's supremacy over the 2019 charter, agreed to restore a regional-federal system of governance, established a provision of proportional representation for Darfur, and more. Also for Darfur, the agreement promised 28 different plans for the region's well being.

=== Wealth Sharing ===
Much like the first protocol, this one has many general principles such as recognizing that fair allocation of resources/revenue/resources is for the betterment of Sudan. That statement itself is the first principle, which encapsulates the many similar points spelled out in the beginning part of this section. The same overarching themes find their way into the more detailed aspects of this section. For example, the establishment of a National Revenue Fund, Darfur Reconstruction and Development Commission, and other development projects are all loaded with promises of wealth sharing. This area of the document also makes sure to explicitly mention what exclusive revenue sources the Darfur Region and its states have (i.e. taxes on property/land, tourism, domestic loans). All in all, there are 29 unique principles that are in this section relating to the fair economic outlook of Sudan.

=== Justice, Accountability, and Reconciliation ===
The third protocol of the Juba Peace Agreement seeks to address the plethora of human rights violations that had occurred in the region for years. This portion's general principles largely surrounding the respecting, upholding, and adopting of justice measures to combat war crimes and genocide. Many of these focuses are to help victims of violence in Sudan to have justice on a legal and democratic level. A big change made in these sections is that unless a violation of law requires the ICC, the National Judiciary's (newly-added in the latter part of this section) Special Court for Darfur, Truth and Reconciliation Committees, and Sudanese Courts have the power to exercise authority. Chapter 3 of the Juba Peace Protocols also has a section on memorialization of victims in Darfur to promote symbolic peace.

=== Compensation and Reparations ===
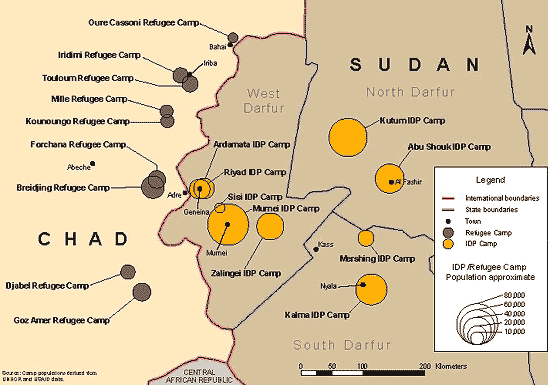
Map of refugee camps in Darfur as a result of the war

Chapter 4 of the Juba Peace Agreement focuses on the justice financially and institutionally for those who were victims of the conflict in Darfur. This chapter says that said justice can be in the form of compensation, restitution, rehabilitation, commemoration, and/or satisfaction. It also establishes that the term "victims of the conflict in Darfur" relates to the following:

1. Survivors of rape, victims of physical, mental, and psychological injuries or those who lost their property or whose basic rights were violated
2. Parentless children
3. Unaccompanied children
4. Separated children
5. Immediate family or dependents of persons who suffered harm as defined in the first bullet
6. Non-combatants who suffered harm while intervening to assist persons in distress or to prevent victimization

Furthermore, this chapter of the peace agreement also explains the rights of those seeking compensation/reparations and the establishment of a fund for the aforementioned causes.

=== Internally Displaced Persons and Refugees ===
To start of Chapter 5 of the agreement's protocols, there are clear definitions of the terms internally displaced persons (IDPs), refugees, displaced persons, and residents on lands of others (people illegally living on others' lands after Darfur began. These definitions set the table for a handful of protocols to ensure all parties involved in Darfur are bound to international law relating to displaced persons and refugees. In addition, the document states that IDPs and refugees have the right of return, citizenship, identity, participation, ownership, and housing. This section also lays out the logistics of compensation for property and housing as well as creating suitable conditions for return.

On a more global level, Chapter 5 guarantees that IDPs and refugees were to receive urgent humanitarian aid and a comprehensive strategy on resettlement. Additionally, it paved the way for the creation of an IDP and Refugees Commission (IDPRC) and elaborates on the planning for it.

=== Development of the Nomads and Herdeers Sector in the Darfur Region ===
This chapter of the protocols directly highlighted the issues that brought about the War in Darfur—mainly the environmental aspect. The war itself is wildly complex, and one of the many reasons for its inception was the differing styles of agriculture practiced among the more rural tribal groups of the region. The dispute between nomadic and sedentary farmers over land was used as an opportunity by the Sudanese government to manufacture conflict between the Arab nomads and African pastoralists. But in the aftermath of the violence, this section outlined a path to equality between nomads and herders.

In particular, Chapter 6 hones in on the prevention of future tribal friction by assuring resources are protected and invested in. Considering environmental detriment exacerbated the fight for resources, this plan was installed in the Juba Agreement to ensure a more equitable future for both resources and the groups using them. Most of this section lays out the foundation of promoting peace between the various ethnic groups through creating agencies for agricultural cooperation.

=== Land and Hawakeer ===
A Hawakeer is an exclusively Sudanese term for means traditional or tribal land ownership rights deemed in effect by the people living in a particular area. This is the point of emphasis in Chapter 7 of the Juba Peace protocols. Recognizing the traditional ownership of these tribal lands and the historic rights of related lands are the main focusses of this portion—specifically regarding livestock routes and water access. The primary way the agreement decides to solve tension about land rights is with official demarcating of Darfur's borders and the creation of the Darfur Lands and Hawakeer Commission (DLHC). The rest of this chapter spells out the responsibilities and powers of the DLHC as well as its funding.

=== Permanent Ceasefire and Final Security Agreement ===
Both the longest and most detailed portion of the protocols, Chapter 8 meticulously details the plans for achieving immediate peace that can provide the stability needed to implement the prior sections. A preamble with five overarching statements begins the section before definitions are provided for a myriad of terms used throughout. From there, Chapter 8 states the purpose of the agreement, the parties involved, the guiding principles of the agreement, and a prelude to the phases of Final Security Agreements. The first of those agreements is the cessation of hostilities, followed by a permanent ceasefire (which is thoroughly described in the agreement). After that, both permissible and prohibited acts are listed for all parties involved, before the ceasefire preparations are explained. Majority of the remaining components of the section are centered around the code of conduct during the ceasefire and the guardrails put in place at the time of the ceasefire and beyond. Along the multifaceted guidelines of Disarmament, Demobilization, and Reintegration (DDR), all the signing parties are given a well thought out path towards stability. Lastly, after even more information regarding implementations of various programs/methods/organizations, the final chapter of the Juba Agreement concludes with rules for the mediators of the document and final provisions.

== Signing Parties ==
=== The Transitional Government of Sudan ===
Following a 2019 coup d'etat and subsequent removal of former President Omar al-Bashir, Sudan implemented a transitional government to shift towards a democratic system. Though this government hasn't come without turmoil of its own, it did oust the president who intensified the conflict in Darfur and is seen as one of the leading culprits of the bloodshed. Upon being thrust into leadership, the transitional government led by Abdalla Hamdok and Abdel Fattah al-Burhan led the new state's efforts to find common ground with the rebel groups of Darfur

=== The Armed Struggle Movements – Darfur Path ===
==== Sudan Liberation Movement / Army ====
The SLM is a primarily South-Sudanese was formed at 1989 as a direct result of Hassan al-Turabi's National Islamic Front gaining power of Sudan following the overthrowing of Ahmed al-Mirghani. The NIF implemented unequal policies against non-Arab regarding land and power sharing (therefore setting the table for Darfur years in advance). Therefore, the SLM has pushed for their rights/representation far before any violence was inflicted upon non-Arabs. Though, after that violence occurred, it became just another reason the SLM joined in on the Juba agreement—which gave each of its factions three seats on the sovereignty council, a total of five ministers in the transitional cabinet and a quarter of seats in the transitional legislature.

==== Sudan Liberation Movement - Transitional Council (SLM-TC) ====
Spearheaded by al-Hadi Idris Yahya, this faction of the SLM broke away from its parent group because of its unwillingness to negotiate with former president Omar al-Bashir. Once the transitional government was implemented after al-Bashir's removal, the group signed onto the peace agreement.

==== Justice and Equality Movement (JEM) ====
After the Black Book, a manuscript that detailed the marginalization of non-Arabs in Sudan, was published in 2000, the JEM was founded with a strong focus on restoring democracy and diplomacy to the state. Given the two's similar viewpoints, the JEM and SLM's primary factions allied around 2010 and served as some of the leading forces in the forced removal of president Al-Bashir. The JEM and the SLM also received the same representation across the transitional government when they signed onto the Juba agreement.

==== Sudan People's Liberation Movement - North ====
The SPLM-N was established by various factions of the SPLM/A that remained in Sudan following the South Sudan gaining independence in 2011. The group then split into a pair of factions, named SPLM-N (Agar) and SPLM-N (al-Hilu), after being unable to see eye-to-eye on secularization in 2017. That, coupled with fighting in the Blue Nile, saw a falling out between the SPLM-N's two primary ideological groups. However, both the Agar and al-Hilu signed onto the Juba Agreement in 2020.

==== Sudan Liberation Forces Alliance (SLFA) ====
This party is a byproduct of the various factions and splinter groups of the main groups involved in the war in Darfur. The SLFA includes three rebel groups: the SLM-Unity faction, the Liberation and Justice Movement (LJM), and a portion of the JEM. Each of these different parties consists of multiple tribes and rebel groups within.

=== Witnesses ===
- Egypt
- Qatar
- The African Union
- The United Nations
- The European Union
- Ambassador Khalid Abdulrahim of the Arab League

=== Guarantors ===
- General Salva Kiir - President of the Republic of South Sudan
- Marshal Idriss Déby Itno - President of the Republic of Chad
- United Arab Emirates

== Finalization ==
=== Final Signature ===
On Saturday 3 October 2020, Juba, the capital of South Sudan, witnessed the signing of the final stage of peace agreement between the Sudanese government and a number of armed movements, to resolve decades of conflicts in Darfur, South Kordofan and Southern Blue Nile that led to the displacement of millions and the deaths of hundreds of thousands, with the participation of many sponsors, most notably the UAE.

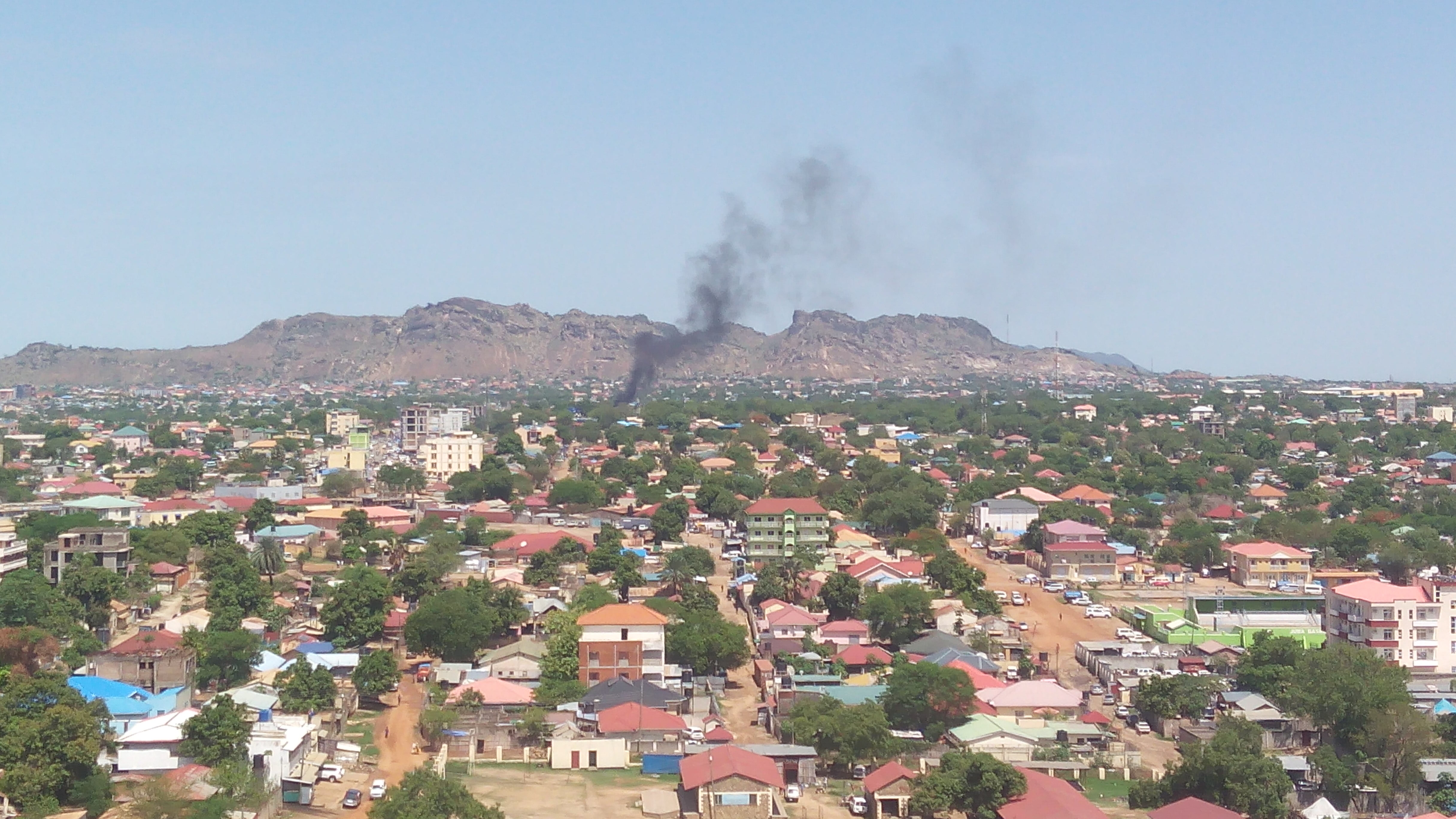
City of Juba, South Sudan

The signing ceremony at Freedom Square in Juba was attended by the presidents of Chad, Djibouti and Somalia, along with the prime ministers of Egypt and Ethiopia, the Emirati Minister of Energy, the US Special Envoy for Sudan and South Sudan and representatives of a number of Western countries. Among the armed groups that signed the Juba Agreement, the Sudan Liberation Army Movement, The Arko Minawi wing, the Justice and Equality Movement, and the popular movement, Malik Aqar's wing, along with other factions.

=== Global Reactions ===
In the days and months after the signing of the Juba Peace agreement, various global powers announced their support for the transitional government of Sudan in its efforts to democratize. Namely, the United Nations, who had a key role in overseeing the agreement. In a statement released on October 9, 2020, the UN Security Council congratulated Sudan on the concord, while also praising the various parties involved (specifically South Sudan). Furthermore, the Security Council also introduced the United Nations Integrated Transition Assistance Mission in Sudan (UNITAMS) and the African Union-United Nations Mission in Darfur (UNAMID). However, UNITAMS was terminated by Sudan in November 2023 and the UN agreed to do so. This decision was made due to a lack of progress implementing certain aspects of the agreement, which has become a common trend in the immediate years following the finalization in Juba.

As for the United States, it joined the UN in commending the Juba Agreement's signatories in October 2021—one year after its signings. This statement from the U.S. was a joint release alongside the United Kingdom and Norway, which focussed on applauding the progress made in the time after the signing but urging for less delays in implementing the entire accord.

Coincidentally enough, Amnesty International, one of the global human rights leaders, hinted at these issues possibly arising when it released its statement prior to the official signing of the JPA. The organization's article mentioned the need for the agreement to be a practice and not just a document, which has proven to be an issue in the time since its signing.

== Bibliography ==
- "Reports of the Secretary-General on the Sudan and South Sudan". United Nations Security Council. 5 August 2022.
- Al-Ali, Zaid (2021). The Juba Agreement for Peace in Sudan: Summary and Analysis (PDF). International Institute for Democracy and Electoral Assistance (International IDEA). ISBN 978-91-7671-387-7.
- "U.S. Relations With South Sudan". United States Department of State. ProQuest 2731215936.
- Assal, Munzoul A. M. (September 2022). "Forging the Juba Peace Agreement: The Role of National, Regional, and International Actors". African Conflict and Peacebuilding Review. 12 (2): 5–22. doi:10.2979/africonfpeacrevi.12.2.02. S2CID 253081704. Project MUSE 868103 ProQuest 2725360838.
- Dahir, Abdi Latif (31 August 2020). "Sudan Signs Peace Deal With Rebel Alliance". The New York Times.
- Gissel, Line Engbo (3 April 2017). "Legitimising the Juba peace Agreement on Accountability and Reconciliation: the International Criminal Court as a third-party actor?" (PDF). Journal of Eastern African Studies. 11 (2): 367–387. doi:10.1080/17531055.2017.1303249. S2CID 151410347.
- "Juba to host meeting of Sudan's armed groups to discuss ways to stop war". Sudan Tribune. 18 October 2023. Archived from the original on June 11, 2024.
- Ndiloseh, Melvis (September 2022). "The 2020 Juba Peace Agreement: A Critical Analysis of the Building Blocks for Democratic Elections in Sudan". African Conflict and Peacebuilding Review. 12 (2): 195–215. doi:10.2979/africonfpeacrevi.12.2.11. S2CID 253081833. Project MUSE 868112 ProQuest 2725359407.
- "Despite Implementation of Peace Agreement, Insecurity Persists in Darfur, Sudan Sanctions Committee Chair Tells Security Council". APO Group-Africa Newsroom (Press release). United Nations-Security Council. 14 September 2021.
- "Secretary-General's remarks at the High-Level Side Event on Sudan". APO Group-Africa Newsroom (Press release). United Nations-Office of the Spokesperson for the Secretary-General. 30 September 2021.
- "Security Council Press Statement on the Juba Peace Agreement (Sudan)" (Press release). United Nations. 9 October 2020.
- "Sudan: Peace agreement must deliver on people's quest for dignity and justice" (Press release). Amnesty International. 31 August 2020.
- "Sudan's government, rebel groups sign landmark deal". Al Jazeera. 3 October 2020.
- "Troika Statement on the Anniversary of the Juba Peace Agreement" (Press release). United States Department of State. 3 October 2021.
