= Masalit people =

Ethnic group in western Sudan and eastern Chad

Masalit
- Flag used by some Masalit nationalists

Total population
- 979,000

Regions with significant populations
- Wadai Region (Chad) and West Darfur (Sudan)
- Chad: 682,000 (2024)
- Sudan: 297,000 (2022)

Languages
- Masalit, Chadian Arabic, Sudanese Arabic

Religion
- Sunni Islam

Related ethnic groups
- Maba, Fur, Zaghawa, Nilo-Saharans

The Masalit (Masalit: masala/masara; Arabic: مساليت) are an ethnic group inhabiting western Sudan and eastern Chad. They speak the Masalit language.

== Overview ==
The Masalit people are generally located in the West Darfur region

Linguistic map of the non-Arab peoples of Darfur, showing the extent of the Masalit language in Sudan.

The Masalit primarily live in Geneina, the capital of West Darfur, though a few thousand also live in Al Qadarif State in eastern Sudan, and in South Darfur. According to Ethnologue, there were 462,000 total Masalit speakers as of 2011, of whom 350,000 resided in Sudan.

Masalit tradition traces their origins to Tunisia. After migrating through Chad, they eventually settled in present-day Sudan.

Before 1874, the Masalit were divided between multiple polities in the region such as the Wadai Sultanate and the Sultanate of Darfur. However, after the conquest of the Sultanate of Darfur by the Ottomans and Egyptians in 1874, the Masalit were unified into a Sultanate by Hajjam Hasab Allah. However, Hajjam's rule was seen by the Masalit population as oppressive. Thus, he was ousted in 1883 by Ismail Abdel Nebi, who took control of the Sultanate. In 1895 the Masalit Sultanate was invaded by the Mahdist State; the Sultan escaped capture by putting himself under the protection of the sultan of Wadai. The fall of the Mahdist state in 1898 did not bring peace to western Darfur. 'Ali Dinar's accession to the throne of a restored Darfur Sultanate, and his claims of sovereignty over all small frontier states, ushered in a new period of conflict. In 1903 'Ali Dinar attacked and defeated the Masalit, and captured and executed their sultan. Subsequently the Sultan's brother, Taj al-Din Isma'il, rallied the Masalit forces and drove out the Darfuri army. The peace treaty of 1908 left 'Ali Dinar in de jure control of the Masalit, but in reality it placed Taj al-Din at the head of a small but proud Masalit state under the vassalage of the Sultanate of Darfur.

Masalit tribes were among the rebel groups that fought against the Sudanese central government and the pro-government Janjaweed militia during the War in Darfur that started in 2003. Reprisals and ethnic cleansing led to an estimated 170,000 deaths over two years, and intermittent violence persisted afterwards. As part of the 2023 civil war in Sudan, the Rapid Support Forces (RSF) (a successor to the Janjaweed) launched a new campaign of ethnic cleansing in Darfur. In June 2023, Khamis Abakar, a Masalit and the governor of West Darfur, accused the RSF of genocide; he was later killed.

== Language ==
The Masalit speak the Masalit language, which belongs to the Maban language group of the Nilo-Saharan language family.

Masalit is divided into several dialects, with the variety spoken in South Darfur differing from that of West Darfur. The northern Masalit dialect is spoken to the east and north of Geneina.

The Masalit language is most closely related to the Marfa, Maba and Karanga languages. It shares 45% of its vocabulary with Marfa, 42% with Maba, and 36% with Karanga.

Most Masalit are bilingual in Arabic, except in the central area, where the Nilo-Saharan vernacular is primarily spoken.

Masalit is written using the Latin script.

== Culture ==
The Masalit are also known as the Kana Masaraka/Masaraka, Mesalit, and Massalit. They are primarily subsistence agriculturalists, cultivating peanuts and millet. Further south in their territory, they grow various other crops, including sorghum. The typical Masalit dwelling is conical in shape, and constructed of wood and thatch.

The Masalit are Muslim and their religious practices incorporate traditional beliefs and customs. Islam first appeared in the area around the 17th century with the arrival of wandering Muslim mystics.

== Genetics ==
Maternally, the Masalit entirely belong to African-based derivatives of the macrohaplogroup L according to Hassan (2010). Of these mtDNA clades, the L0a1 (14.6%) and L1c (12.2%) lineages are most frequent.

According to Hassan et al. (2008), around 71.9% of Masalit are carriers of the E1b1b paternal haplogroup. Of these, 73.9% bear the V32 subclade. Approximately 6.3% also belong to the haplogroup J1. This points to significant patrilineal gene flow from neighbouring Afro-Asiatic-speaking populations. The remaining Masalit are primarily carriers of the A3b2 lineage (18.8%), which is instead common among Nilotes.

This altogether suggests that the genetic introgression into the Masalit's ancestral population was asymmetrical, occurring primarily through Afro-Asiatic-speaking males rather than females.

== Notable Masalit people ==
- Usumain Baraka (born 1994), activist
- Khamis Abakar (1964-2023), former governor of West Darfur

== See also ==
- Battle of Geneina
- War in Darfur
- Masalit genocide
- Dar Erenga
- Abu Suruj
