= Geneina =

City in West Darfur, Sudan

Geneina الجنينة
- City
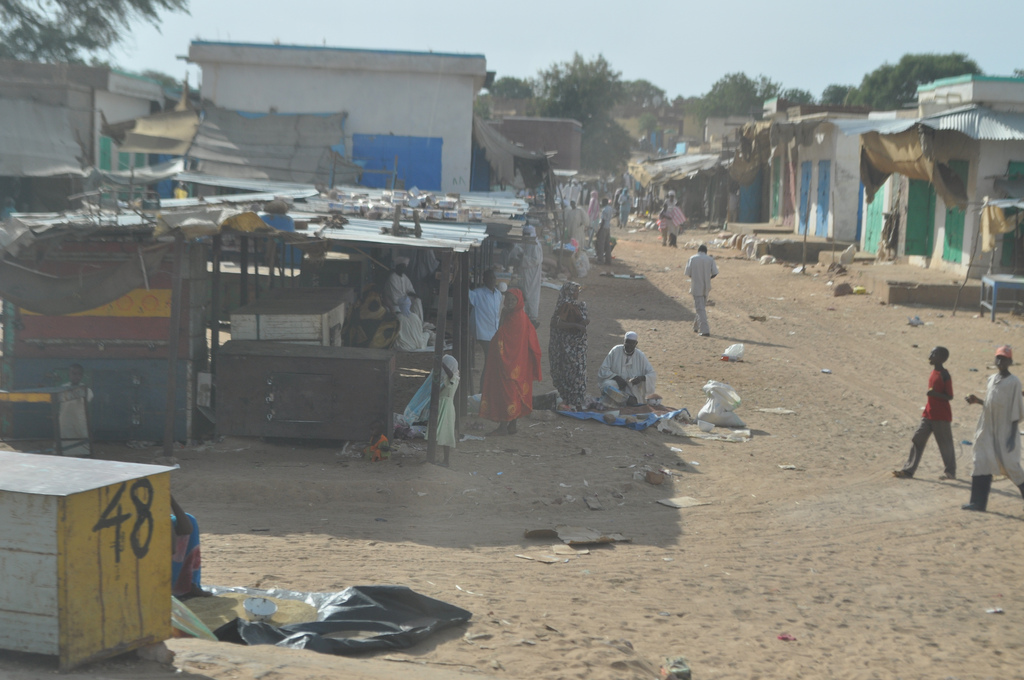
- El Geneina in 2009

- Location in Sudan
- Coordinates: 13°26′02″N 22°26′05″E
- Country: Sudan
- State: West Darfur
- Control: Rapid Support Forces
- Elevation: 807 m (2,646 ft)

Population (2024)
  - Total: 540,000
- (Human Rights Watch)
- Time zone: UTC+02:00 (CAT)

Geneina (sometimes Al-Junaynah or El Geneina; Arabic: الجنينة, lit. 'the little garden') is a city in West Darfur, part of the dar Masalit region, in Sudan. It joined British Sudan at the end of 1919 through the Gilani Agreement, signed between the Masalit Sultanate and the United Kingdom, according to which it became a territory.

Geneina is now the capital of the Sudanese state of West Darfur. As of 2022, it had a population of 538,390 pre-war being one of the most populated cities within the country. According to the UNICEF nearly the entire population are IDPs and a large part are still young children.

During the 2023 Sudan conflict, the Battle of Geneina was fought. This event included the deadly Geneina massacre, in which, as of 19 August 2023, thousands of civilians were killed, mainly Masalits and other non-Arab tribes. The RSF took control of the city by 22 June.

== History ==
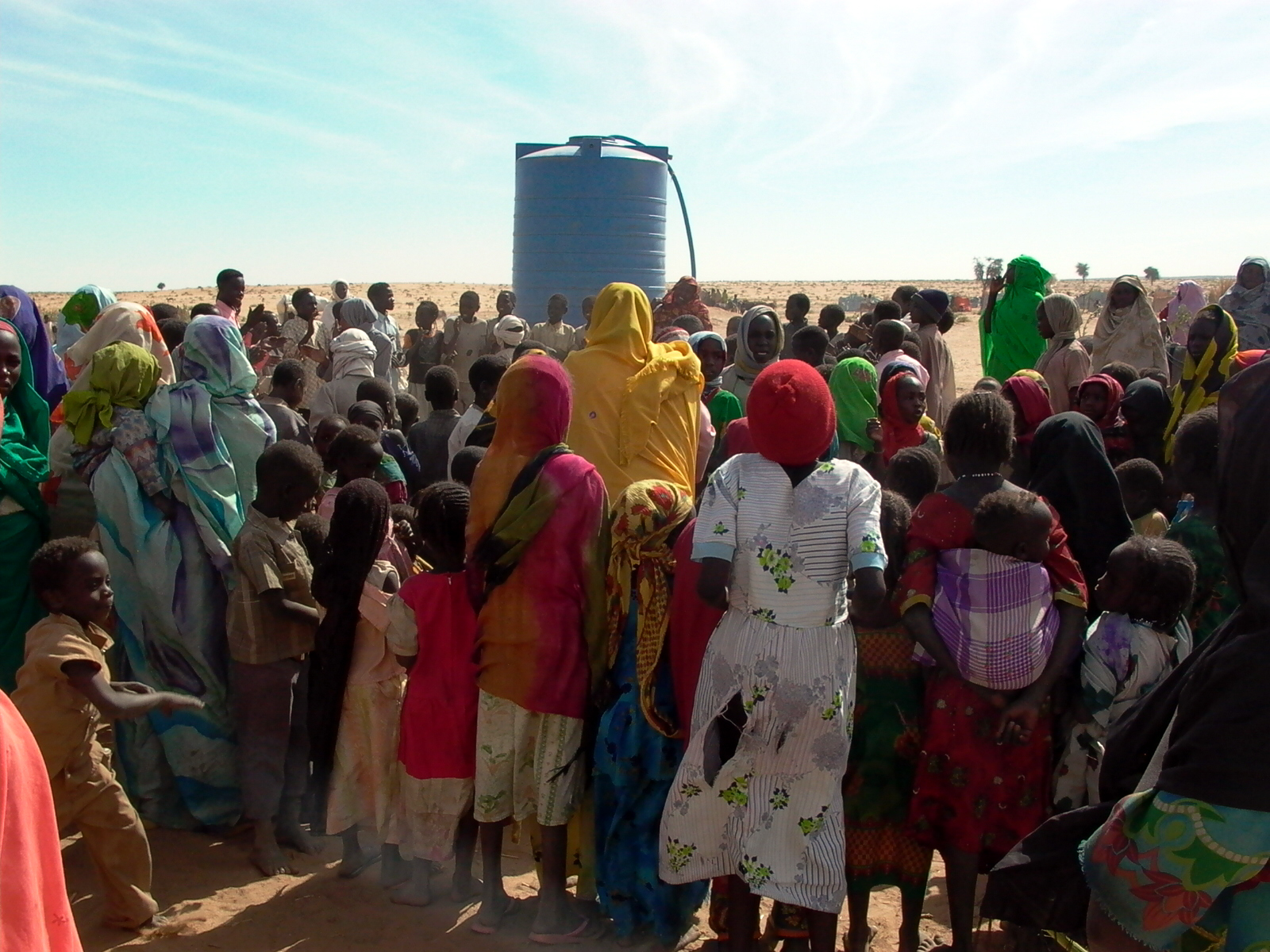
Displaced persons with water tank in Geneina in 2007

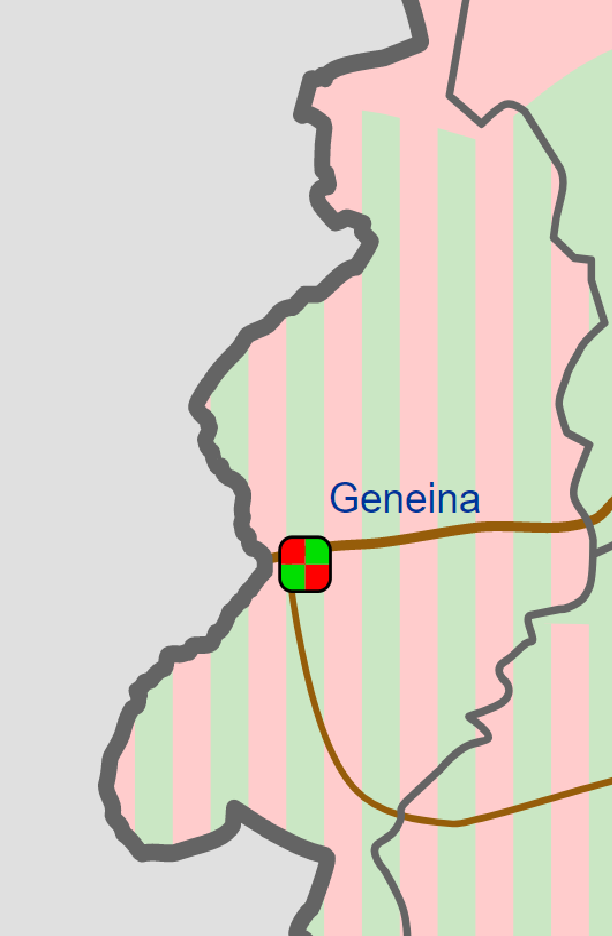
Situation in Geneina in late April 2023

The city has the biggest group of Masalit people in Sudan and Darfur. This group was heavily targeted during the War in Darfur but had remained in a state of peace for several years. During the War in Darfur, genocide against the Masalit people caught the attention of the UN, sparking controversy between the organization and Sudan.

In early 2023, tensions rose between the Sudanese Armed Forces, led by the 2021 coup leader Abdel Fattah al-Burhan, and the paramilitary Rapid Support Forces led by Hemedti, remnants of Omar al-Bashir's Janjaweed that committed ethnic cleansing against non-Arab tribes in Darfur. These tensions came to a head on 15 April 2023, when RSF forces attacked Sudanese forces in Khartoum, Merowe, and several cities across Darfur, including Nyala, El Fasher, and Geneina.

Geneina was considered strategic due to its important location in Darfur, it remained a large location for West Darfur and Chadian civilians who had almost no access to food or education due to the deserted regions.

In Geneina, West Darfur governor Khamis Abakar declared a state of emergency on 10 April due to the killing of three people by the Sudanese Alliance, a militia led by the governor. Clashes between Arabs and non-Arabs also broke out in Foro-Baranga, on the border with Chad, on 13 April, leaving 24 people dead.

The city came under siege by RSF and aligned militias by early June, and ended with the RSF gaining control El Geneina by the 22 of June. Up to 15,000 people were killed in Geneina in the Masalit massacres.

=== History of the name "Geneina" ===
The word “Geneina” in Arabic means garden, and it is a diminutive of the word paradise, with the resulting meaning of garden or orchard. The city of El Geneina was given this name on account of its green nature, as the city is full of gardens, orchards, and green fields. The name also goes back to Sultan Bahr al-Din, Sultan of Masalit, who was the first to rule the city. It is called “Al-Geneina Enduka”, which is the nickname of Sultan Muhammad Bahr al-Din Enduka. The Masalit word Enduka implies extreme generosity.

== Geography ==
=== Climate ===
Geneina has a hot semi-arid climate (Köppen BSh) with two distinct seasons: a short, warm and humid wet season from mid-June to late September, which causes lakes and ponds to form at some points of the year, and a long, hot, desiccating dry season covering the remaining nine months of the year.

Climate data for Geneina (1991–2020 normals, extremes 1961–2020)
Month	Jan	Feb	Mar	Apr	May	Jun	Jul	Aug	Sep	Oct	Nov	Dec	Year
Record high °C (°F)	39.8 (103.6)	41.5 (106.7)	41.8 (107.2)	45 (113)	43 (109)	42.3 (108.1)	42.5 (108.5)	40 (104)	39.6 (103.3)	40.7 (105.3)	38.5 (101.3)	42.5 (108.5)	45 (113)
Mean daily maximum °C (°F)	30.5 (86.9)	33.3 (91.9)	36.4 (97.5)	38.7 (101.7)	38.6 (101.5)	37.0 (98.6)	32.9 (91.2)	30.9 (87.6)	33.6 (92.5)	35.2 (95.4)	33.6 (92.5)	31.2 (88.2)	34.3 (93.7)
Daily mean °C (°F)	21.4 (70.5)	24.1 (75.4)	27.3 (81.1)	29.8 (85.6)	30.6 (87.1)	30.0 (86.0)	27.1 (80.8)	25.6 (78.1)	26.9 (80.4)	27.2 (81.0)	24.9 (76.8)	22.2 (72.0)	26.4 (79.5)
Mean daily minimum °C (°F)	12.3 (54.1)	14.8 (58.6)	18.2 (64.8)	20.9 (69.6)	22.7 (72.9)	23.0 (73.4)	21.3 (70.3)	20.4 (68.7)	20.3 (68.5)	19.2 (66.6)	16.3 (61.3)	13.2 (55.8)	18.6 (65.5)
Record low °C (°F)	3 (37)	3.4 (38.1)	10 (50)	11 (52)	14 (57)	15.5 (59.9)	15 (59)	13.2 (55.8)	13.4 (56.1)	9.5 (49.1)	7.6 (45.7)	5 (41)	3 (37)
Average precipitation mm (inches)	0.0 (0.0)	0.0 (0.0)	0.0 (0.0)	3.2 (0.13)	17.2 (0.68)	33.5 (1.32)	174.2 (6.86)	212.5 (8.37)	65.3 (2.57)	11.0 (0.43)	0.1 (0.00)	0.0 (0.0)	517.1 (20.36)
Average precipitation days (≥ 1.0 mm)	0.0	0.0	0.0	0.5	1.9	3.6	12.2	14.4	6.2	1.3	0.0	0.0	40.2
Average relative humidity (%)	17	14	12	15	24	38	61	68	54	31	19	18	31
Mean monthly sunshine hours	297.6	266.0	275.9	267.0	263.5	243.0	213.9	201.5	228.0	272.8	300.0	306.9	3,136.1
Source: NOAA

== Economy ==
The city is characterized by the presence of many economic sources, and its economy depends on the sectors: agriculture, pastoralism, trade, and services.

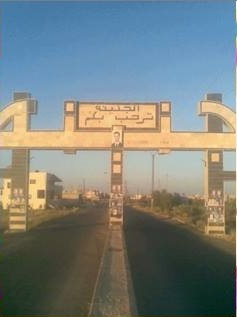
A sign at the entrance of Geneina in Arabic saying "Geneina welcomes you!"

Agriculture constitutes the sector on which the economy relies the most for soil fertility and the abundance of rain and groundwater. The spread of hashab tree forests around the city has made it an important source for the production of gum arabic. In addition to this, crops such as cotton, tobacco, sorghum, sesame, millet, watermelon, hibiscus, okra and some fruits are grown, such as mango, guava, papaya and orange.

Grazing and livestock raising come in second place as economic resources in the El Geneina area, including cows, goats, and camels.

Trade, including local retail trade and export trade, constitutes a source of wealth and production in the city, in addition to the various services sector.

== Demographics ==
Historical population
Year	Pop.	±%
1973	35,424	—
1983	55,996	+58.1%
1993	92,831	+65.8%
2010	169,259	+82.3%
2022	538,390	+218.1%
2023	168,946	−68.6%

Like many regions of Sudan, a number of different tribes live in the city of El Geneina, which, by virtue of their coexistence and intermarriage, share many common customs, traditions, and popular heritage. Among these tribes are: the Mahamid, the Hausa, the Zaghawa, the Tama, the Fur, the Misseriya, the Erenga, and the Baygo, in addition to the tribes coming from central and northern Sudan, including the Ja'alin tribe. The Masalit ethnic group is considered the most important and prominent tribe inhabiting the El Geneina region, which it administers according to the native administration system in Sudan and the Hawakir system prevailing in the region.

=== Education ===
In addition to primary and secondary schools at their various levels and courses, there is a university in the city, the University of El Geneina, which has a number of colleges, including the College of Medicine of Geneina. Most of the population is not fully educated and nearly 45% is unemployed as of October 2023.

== Transportation ==
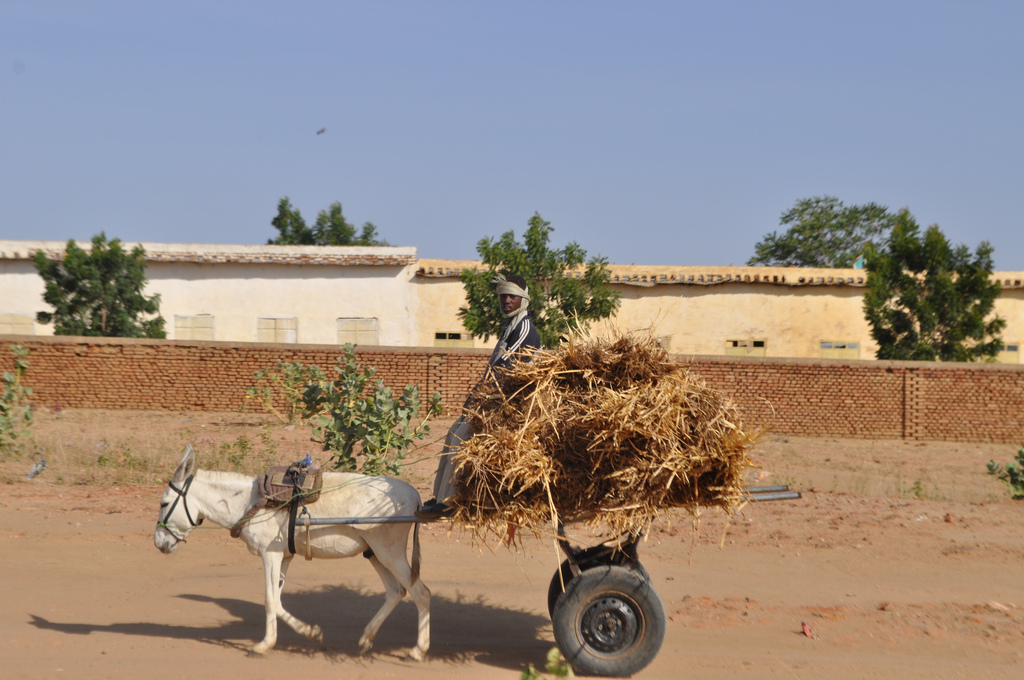
A resident uses an animals transportation across the city.

Most of the city's roads are unpaved, but the city has a highway which leads to Nyala. (Note: The highway was most likely destroyed due to the battle.) The locality is served by the Geneina Airport (IATA: EGN, ICAO: HSGN) and the El Shaheed Sibeira Airport (ICAO: HSSG), which hosts the Sudanese Armed Forces, and is used for flights across the country of Sudan. Since the start of the conflict, the airport has been closed and most likely destroyed due to large amounts of shelling and continued fighting. The closest airports to it are Zalingei Airport, which is 110 kilometers (68.3 miles) away, and El Fasher Airport and Adre Airport in Chad.
