= Ethnic conflict in West Darfur (2019-2023) =

Date	December 20, 2019 - April 15, 2023
Location	West Darfur, Sudan
Result	Subsumed by Sudanese civil war (2023-present)

Belligerents
Masalit people: Sudanese Alliance (from 2021); Gimir people	Janjaweed: Rizeigat Arab militiamen; Abbala Arab militiamen; Rapid Support Forces; Chadian militiamen

Commanders and leaders
Khamis Abakar	Hemedti

Casualties and losses
- 1,089+ mostly Masalit and Gimir civilians killed 200,000+ displaced

Between the end of the Sudanese revolution in 2019 and the start of the Sudanese civil war in April 2023, Janjaweed militiamen and the Rapid Support Forces attacked predominantly-Masalit communities in West Darfur, killing thousands of people. The conflict was largely in waves of Janjaweed-led attacks against Masalit communities at IDP camps in the West Darfur capital of Geneina, although other massacres took place at Misterei, Beida, and Kulbus.

== Background ==
West Darfur is home to two main ethnic groups that can best be divided into Arabs and non-Arabs. The largest non-Arab group is the Masalit who consider the area Dar Masalit (Land of the Masalit), with their sultan living in the state's capital of El Geneina. Other non-Arab groups include the Tama, Bargo, and Zaghawa. All of these groups live in both Sudan and across the border in Chad. The Arabs refer mainly to various nomadic groups in Darfur, with the largest in West Darfur being the Rizeigat tribe, part of the larger Baggara confederation.

Non-Arab communities have historically been sedentary farmers, while the Arabs have been nomadic. Some communal clashes occurred, but for the most part Arabs and non-Arabs coexisted peacefully in the region. The 1980s was the end of this peaceful period, as government neglect, an influx of arms from Chad's civil war, and the worst drought in decades brought many Arabs to non-Arab communities to compete over dwindling resources. Violent clashes broke out between Arab herders and non-Arab farmers when Arab herders would let their cows graze on non-Arab farms.

=== War in Darfur ===
In 2003, war broke out in western Sudan's Darfur region between the government-sponsored, predominantly Arab Janjaweed militia aided by the Sudanese Armed Forces against the predominantly non-Arab Sudan Liberation Movement and Justice and Equality Movement, after SLM and JEM launched attacks against the Sudanese government and accusing them of genocide.

On 25 March 2003, the rebels seized the garrison town of Tine along the Chadian border, seizing large quantities of supplies and arms. The rebellion began partially due to feelings of marginalization among Zaghawa, Fur, and Masalit civilians in Darfur following Arabization campaigns carried out by President Omar al-Bashir. In response, Bashir mobilized Arab civilians into militias called Janjaweed who conducted a genocide of non-Arab civilians through scorched earth campaigns. In 2013, the formation of the Rapid Support Forces (RSF) led by Hemedti, a Rizeigat Arab, began conducting operations against the rebel groups. The RSF was known for its brutality against civilian areas sympathetic to the rebels.

El Geneina, as the capital of West Darfur, saw an extensive amount of violence, due to its location as the sultanate of the Masalit people. The city had a population of 250,000 in 2008.

=== Sudanese revolution and Juba Agreement ===
In late 2018, protests against Omar al-Bashir broke out in major cities like El Obeid and Khartoum, spiraling into a revolution that culminated in the overthrow of al-Bashir in April 2019, and the establishment of the Transitional Sovereignty Council (TSC) led by army commander-in-chief Abdel Fattah al-Burhan and RSF commander Hemedti. After further protests and international pressure following the Khartoum massacre, the TSC instated a civilian government under Abdalla Hamdok.

Under Hamdok, the Sudanese government signed the Juba Peace Agreement with a multitude of rebel groups across the country. All rebel groups except for Abdelaziz al-Hilu's SPLM-N faction in South Kordofan and Abdul Wahid al-Nur's SLM signed the agreement, ending de jure the War on Darfur. The Juba Agreement also led to the withdrawal of United Nations–African Union Mission in Darfur (UNAMID), which was a major preventer of communal and militia-sponsored violence in West Darfur through its peacekeeping contingent in Geneina. UNAMID withdrew from West Darfur in 2020.

== UNAMID era ==
=== Krinding and pre-TSC attacks ===
Throughout 2019, attacks by Janjaweed against civilians continued sporadically despite the ongoing Sudanese revolution. In March 2019, Janjaweed fighters shot and killed six civilians in Ardamata, a neighborhood west of the airport at El Geneina, leading to condemnation from various Sudanese political parties. In November 2019, herdsmen killed one and injured three farmers in Kendebe, near Sirba. However, violence on a broader scale did not occur until December 2019, after the revolution had succeeded and the Transitional Sovereignty Council was in power. One of the main factors of the resurgence in ethnic conflict in West Darfur in late 2019 was the decision by UNAMID to move their base from Geneina to Zalingei after the revolution as part of the drawdown.

The conflict renewed en masse on December 29, 2019, when a Rizeigat Arab man named Hamid Bishara Abu Bakr was shot and killed by a Masalit man in the Krinding IDP camp east of Geneina. The following day, Rizeigat tribesmen joined by Rapid Support Forces militiamen and about 15 Sudanese policemen raided the Krinding camp, burning it down and going home-to-home and killing people. The attacks continued into December 31, and by early 2020 the death toll was reported to be about 72 people killed and 109 injured. A further 48,000 people fled elsewhere in Sudan or across the border to Chad.

The Sudanese government conducted an investigation into the massacre led by attorney general Tag el-Sir el-Hibir, which concluded in March.

=== Misterei sit-in massacre ===
UNAMID reported that there was an 87% increase in attacks from 2019, with 28 attacks and 126 deaths between July and December 2020. Between March and May 2020, there were only 13 clashes and 93 fatalities. On July 17, protesters in the town of Misterei calling for the Sudanese government to sack individuals within the administration affiliated with deposed president Omar al-Bashir and the massacres from the war in Darfur, following similar protests that broke out on July 6 in Fata Borno, North Darfur. The RSF in Fata Borno attacked the protesters, killing nine and injuring 17. The Misterei protesters were attacked on July 18, leaving 17 civilians injured, and called on the West Darfur state government for support, but none came.

On July 25, 2020, the Darfur Network For Human Rights said that around 3,000 Arab militiamen coalesced on Misterei from all directions, sparking clashes between Masalit Sudanese Alliance militiamen and the Janjaweed that left 60 people dead and over 50 wounded. The United Nations in September said that at least 75 civilians were killed in the Misterei massacre. Men wearing RSF uniforms were among the perpetrators, and some perpetrators reportedly came from Chad. Almost all of the victims were Masalit, and the injured were taken to hospitals in El Geneina. Thirty villages were affected across all attacks in summer 2020, and 1,500 homes were destroyed. 7,000 people were displaced from Misterei after the attack, and 13,000 people were displaced from El Geneina.

Another three people were killed in West Darfur between June and September 2020 according to the U.N., but the circumstances, date, and location were not mentioned. UNAMID's mandate ended in December 2020, despite calls from experts and human rights organizations saying that UNAMID's departure would cause a security vacuum. While other outbreaks of violence had been reported in South Darfur, North Darfur, and Central Darfur, over half of all reported incidents in 2020 were located in West Darfur.

== Post-UNAMID ==
=== Krinding and El Geneina massacres ===
On January 16, 2021, another bout of violence struck the Krinding IDP camp. Like in the 2019 massacre at the camp, the 2021 massacre was precipitated by the killing of an Arab man by Masalit youth. In this case, the killer was arrested, although this did not stop hordes of Janjaweed militiamen, Rapid Support Forces fighters, Chadian militiamen, and armed Arab civilians from descending upon the camp and slaughtering hundreds of civilians and burning their homes. Satellite imagery showed much of Krinding aflame; a day later, West Darfur governor Mohammed Abdalla Aldoma said almost a third of the camp had been burnt down. The United Nations stated that Masalit men had taken up arms to defend Krinding, and that many of the attackers were Mahameed Arabs. The death toll, according to Amnesty International, was 163 killed and 217 wounded. The United States State Department said that 300 were injured and over 149,000 people were displaced.

The Sudanese government and West Darfur state government began to take a much more proactive role after the second Krinding massacre. The Sudanese Armed Forces began deploying troops to the area, while governor Aldoma instated a curfew and allowed the SAF to use lethal force when necessary. Top Sudanese officials visited Geneina and Krinding and condemned the carnage; Rapid Support Forces commander Hemedti denied RSF involvement. Protests broke out after the second Krinding massacre by Arabs, who blockaded the city and prevented humanitarian aid and flights from entering. The sit-in ended on February 7, 2021.

Another round of massacres broke out on April 4, this time in Masalit neighborhoods of the city of El Geneina, where Janjaweed and Arab civilians began slaughtering civilians in Abu Zar IDP camp. In the densely populated neighborhood of al-Jabel, Masalit militiamen fought Arabs in the streets. The massacre took place over three days between April 4 and 7, and left 144 people killed and 233 injured. As with previous massacres, the perpetrators included men in RSF uniform. Human Rights Watch noted that while there was no evidence that RSF leadership issued direct orders for their fighters to participate in the massacre, they also did not issue orders to not participate. Much of the IDP camps were burnt down as a result of the massacre.

After the Geneina massacre, the Sudanese government committed to the formation of a joint protection force for Darfur to fill in the role that UNAMID held. This force was intended to have 12,000 soldiers, and after the massacre it was bumped to 20,000. ACLED reported attacks in Murnei, Azirni, Abu Naima, and Mazrub west of Geneina and near Kreinik after the Geneina attacks in April.

Other intercommunal clashes took place in summer 2021, with five people being killed in clashes between the Tama and Gimr tribes in the villages of Kafani and Tangaki on July 3 and 4. Cross-border raiding between nomadic groups along the Chadian-Sudanese border also took place but details are scant.

== Post-coup ==
Mohammed Abdalla Aldoma was removed as governor and Sudanese Alliance founder Khamis Abakar replaced him in June 2021. In October 2021, Sudanese army commander in chief Abdel Fattah al-Burhan and Rapid Support Forces leader Hemedti overthrew the civilian half of the Transitional Sovereignty Council in a coup. Their struggle for power between October 2021 and April 2023 eventually led to a RSF-led coup attempt that would start the Sudanese civil war. Between October 1 and December 31, 2021, 156 casualties were reported in West Darfur in the areas of Al Kereinik, Azerni, Dar Marra, El Geneina, Gosmino, Hashaba, Jebel Moon, Khazan-kujuk, Kondobei, Kuru Kuru, Kushkush, Misterei, Murnei, Sileia, Sirba, and Tanjikei, according to ACLED.

=== Kreinik massacres ===
Kreinik, an IDP camp west of Geneina, experienced its first massacre post-revolution on December 4, 2021. The massacre was triggered by a dispute between Arab and Masalit, and the Sudanese army deployed reinforcements to the town to prevent conflict. As the government was deploying reinforcements, Arab Janjaweed militiamen and RSF fighters entered Kreinik and began massacreing Masalit civilians. Two IDP camps near Kreinik, Um Duwein and Abuja, were almost entirely razed by the RSF and Janjaweed and much of the camps were set on fire. At least 65 people were killed in the Kreinik massacre, and another 70 injured. Another 15,500 people were displaced. The United Nations also mentioned that many rapes were reported during and after the massacre, and 20 children remain missing.

Fighting between Arabs and Masalit left 11 people dead and eight injured in Adikong on January 20 and 21, 2022. Renewed fighting began in Adikong on April 5 between the same groups after a botched cattle rustling incident, leaving five people dead and two injured. The U.N. reported that all residents of Adikong fled to the Chadian border after the clashes.

The second massacre at Kreinik began on April 22, 2022, with Arab forces attacking the town but being repulsed by Sudanese Alliance militiamen. Two days later, a much larger group of Janjaweed and RSF fighters entered Kreinik, overpowering the Sudanese Alliance and conducting a brutal massacre against civilians in Kreinik town and the nearby villages and IDP camps of Um Duwein, Abuja, Salami, and Shukri. Satellite imagery showed 36 villages across Kreinik locality destroyed by the Janjaweed-RSF militiamen. Human Rights Watch confirmed the deaths of 161 people, while the U.N. reported 210 people killed in Kreinik, 100 injured, and 11 people killed in clashes that had spread to Geneina.

The massacres at Kreinik over a four-month period paralyzed the area, and contributed to Kreinik being the town with the highest rates of food insecurity in June 2022.

==== Misseriya-Arab conflict ====
On December 8, two days after the end of the Kreinik massacre, intercommunal fighting between Arab militias and Misseriya militias in Jebel Moon left 21 people dead. A second round of fighting between March 5 and 15, 2022 left 35 civilians dead in the Jebel Moon area, as well as two Sudanese soldiers. The U.N. reported that some of the individuals who fought at Jebel Moon were part of groups that signed the Juba Peace Agreement, although these groups were not named. Both of these battles appear to be the first conflict between Misseriya Arabs and Arabs (possibly Rizeigat) in West Darfur since 2019.

=== Kulbus massacre ===
Between June 6 and 11, 2022, massive clashes broke out between Gimir militiamen and the Awlad Zaid subclan of the Rizeigat in Kulbus District, an area of West Darfur that had not seen any violence after the revolution. These clashes killed at least 165 civilians and displaced over 50,000 people. Over two dozen Gimir villages were burned down by an army of Rizeigat and Abbala Arab militiamen. The Kulbus massacre was the first major Arab mobilization in response to a non-Masalit community. Sudanese soldiers and RSF militiamen were deployed in late June to quell the violence, although residents of Kulbus attest that RSF fighters were alongside the perpetrators. Brief clashes broke out again in Kulbus between July 21 and 22, killing even more people.

In early August 2022, clashes broke out along the Bir Saliba, near Sirba along the Sudanese-Chadian border, leaving 27 people killed and 36 injured. 18 of the dead and 14 of the injured were Sudanese. Hemedti met with Chadian president Mahamat Déby after the clashes, and Abdel Fattah al-Burhan chaired a West Darfur state meeting to seek peace.

== Sudanese civil war ==
Few clashes took place between Arabs and Masalit between September 2022 and April 2023, although tensions were high between the two communities according to Human Rights Watch. In late March, clashes broke out between Arabs and Masalit in Foro Baranga, leading to Arab/RSF control over the town and for Governor Abakar to implement a month-long state of emergency. Throughout the first few months of 2023, both the Sudanese Armed Forces and the Rapid Support Forces launched recruitment drives across the country, including in West Darfur.

After the failed RSF coup attempt on April 15, 2023, and the subsequent battle of Khartoum, Masalit militiamen began mobilizing in Geneina and Arabs in the village of Shukri, near Kreinik. Brief clashes broke out between Arabs and Masalit in Geneina, but the massacre by Arabs did not begin until April 20. Masalit militiamen battled Arabs for two months between April and May, until they were overran in June. After the assassination of Khamis Abakar on June 14, RSF fighters and Janjaweed killed over 15,000 Masalit and non-Arab civilians in Geneina.

== Actors ==
=== Masalit ===
Masalit self-defense groups began forming in earnest after the first Krinding massacre, according to Human Rights Watch, although they had existed for years and futilely fought Janjaweed at the Misterei massacre. After the second Krinding massacre, guns began spreading throughout the Masalit community as self-defense groups formed in each neighborhood of Geneina. After the April 2021 El Geneina massacre, HRW noted that openly separatist Masalit propaganda began spreading on social media. This propaganda facilitated the arrival of Khamis Abakar's Sudanese Alliance militia, predominantly composed of Masalit. The Sudanese Alliance began recruiting heavily until the start of the battle of Geneina in 2023. Around this same time, rhetoric by Arabs towards Masalit and other non-Arab groups began taking on a racialized tone, with attacks often targeting non-Arabs for their darker complexion.

=== Arabs and Rapid Support Forces ===
Janjaweed militiamen and men in uniforms of the Rapid Support Forces were present at all major massacres. At some massacres, such as the second massacre at Krinding and Geneina, Chadian militiamen were present as well as a more open display of RSF trucks, weaponry, and more. In the first massacre at Krinding, just over a dozen Sudanese policemen participated in the killings. Human Rights Watch said in 2023 that while they couldn't confirm that RSF leadership directed or approved any RSF involvement in the massacres, they couldn't find any proof the RSF directed their members not to intervene. In the massacres at Kreinik, the RSF were deployed "ostensibly to provide support", but conducted the massacre alongside the perpetrators anyway.

Publicly, the RSF supported peace agreements between communities, like one in Kulbus and one in South Darfur mediated by Hemedti in June and July 2022. The Kulbus agreement followed similar agreements made in Geneina, Jebel Moon, Sirba, and Kreinik.

=== Sudanese government ===
The Sudanese Armed Forces, since coming to the forefront of the conflict in 2020, largely did not intervene in any of the massacres despite several taking place right next to Sudanese Army bases or Central Reserve Police bases in Geneina and elsewhere. At one point during the massacre at Kreinik, Sudanese forces fired warning shots to prevent civilians from sheltering at the army's base. However, in late 2022, brief clashes broke out between the RSF and SAF in El Geneina. Top government officials occasionally visited the scenes of the massacres, particularly after the first Kreinik and second Krinding massacres, but were mostly ineffective at providing any stability to the region.
