= Bir Saliba (Soudan) =

Bir Saliba بئر سليبة
- Interactive map of Bir Saliba
- Country: Sudan
- State: West Darfur

Bir Saliba (also spelled Bir Sleiba or Bir Seleiba) is a locality and administrative unit located in the West Darfur state of western Sudan. Situated within the traditional territory of the Erenga people (Dar Erenga), the area holds strategic importance due to its road network connecting northern West Darfur to the state capital, El Geneina, as well as to the Chad-Sudan border.

== Geography and Demographics ==
Bir Saliba is situated in northern West Darfur, at the heart of the Dar Erenga geographical domain. The region is characterized by seasonal wadi basins, agricultural lands, and pastoral routes. The local population is primarily composed of members of the Erenga ethnic group, along with other neighboring communities, whose main livelihoods rely on subsistence agriculture, livestock raising, and local trade.

== History ==
Historically, Bir Saliba and the Dar Erenga region were administered under the local traditional administration system, led by traditional chiefs such as firshas and maliks. During the 19th and 20th centuries, these local leaders played a crucial role in maintaining social cohesion and managing land under successive administrations.

=== Sudanese conflict (2023–2026) ===
During the Sudanese conflict, Bir Saliba became a major strategic location within the theater of military operations in West Darfur. Due to its position along supply routes leading to El Geneina, control over the area has been the subject of fierce fighting.

In August 2026, intense clashes in and around Bir Saliba displaced nearly 6,000 civilians in a single day, according to reports from the International Organization for Migration (IOM).

On October 6, 2026, the Joint Force of Armed Movements—an alliance allied with the Sudanese Armed Forces (SAF)—announced that it had taken full control of the Bir Saliba area following violent clashes with the Rapid Support Forces (RSF) on the Bir Saliba and Abu Suruj fronts.

== See also ==
- Erenga people
- West Darfur
- El Geneina
- Sirba, West Darfur
- Abu Suruj
- Dar Erenga
