= Saraf Jidad =

Saraf Jidad سرف جداد
- Locality / Administrative unit
- Interactive map of Saraf Jidad
- Coordinates: 13.9167°N 22.8333°E
- Country: Sudan
- State: West Darfur
- District: Sirba

Population (prior to 2008)
  - Total: ~15,000

Saraf Jidad (سرف جداد) is a locality and administrative sub-unit situated within Sirba in West Darfur, Sudan.

== Geography and demographics ==
- Territorial affiliation: Saraf Jidad is an administrative unit entirely located within the Sirba zone. It forms an integral part of the historical region of Dar Erenga (دار أرنقا).
- Demographics: Prior to the major military offensives in 2008, the population of Saraf Jidad and its surrounding areas was estimated at approximately 15,000 inhabitants. The local economy relies primarily on agriculture and livestock farming.

== History and conflict (2007–2008) ==
Saraf Jidad and the surrounding Sirba corridor were the focus of several international human rights investigations, including reports by the United Nations Human Rights Council (A/HRC/9/41), Human Rights Watch, and ReliefWeb.

- January 2008 events: During armed incursions in the Sirba area, the police station in Saraf Jidad was attacked by forces belonging to the Justice and Equality Movement (JEM). UN investigations subsequently confirmed that rebel forces had not established permanent bases among the civilian population.
- February 2008 joint offensives: In response, the Sudanese Armed Forces (SAF), supported by allied militias, launched a major military operation targeting the Sirba corridor, including Saraf Jidad, Silea, and Abu Suruj.
- Impact on civilians: The repeated military attacks resulted in significant destruction of civilian infrastructure and forced the displacement of thousands of residents.

== IDP camp and land rights disputes ==
- Formation of the IDP camp: Following the widespread violence in the Sirba sector, an Internally Displaced Persons (IDP) camp was established at Saraf Jidad to shelter displaced populations.
- Contestation of "re-planning": Residents and community leaders in the Saraf Jidad camp strongly opposed urban restructuring and land re-planning initiatives proposed by local government authorities.
- Reasons for rejection: Community leaders perceived the administrative re-planning as an attempt to alter local demographics and dispossess indigenous inhabitants of their traditional land rights.

== See also ==
- Sultanate of Darfur
- War in Darfur
