= 2023 Foro Baranga clashes =

Ongoing battle in the 2023 Sudan conflict

- Part of aftermath of the War in Darfur
Date	April 10–14, 2023
Location	Foro Baranga, West Darfur, Sudan
Result	Unclear: Several neighborhoods torched; 2023 Sudan conflict breaks out on April 15, and the RSF capture the town by April 23

Belligerents
Masalit militiamen	Arab militiamen

Casualties and losses
- 25+ civilians killed 20,000 refugees

On April 10, 2023, clashes broke out between Masalit and Arab civilians in Foro Baranga, West Darfur, Sudan, killing at least 25 people. Four days later the clashes ceased but a wider national conflict broke out.

== Prelude ==
Throughout the War in Darfur, Foro-Baranga was a haven for refugees escaping violence in West Darfur and Central Darfur, owing to its location next to Chad. In 2021, during the 2021 Darfur clashes, many refugees from Kreinik and Jebel Moon sought refuge in the city. However, the new influx of refugees also exacerbated ethnic tensions between the non-Arab Masalit people and Arab tribes in the city. These tensions had broken out into violence before, with protests breaking out in 2021 after the shooting of a kiosk owner.

== Clashes ==
Tensions rose between April 7 and April 10 in the city following sporadic killings of three people from both tribes. In an attempt to quell violence, West Darfur authorities sent extra security forces to the city, although this had little effect. Fighting broke out on April 10, quickly spreading to nine neighborhoods. Fifty homes were burned in the initial violence, and around 20,000 were forced to flee to Chad and the nearby village of Jimmeza. The main neighborhoods affected were the El Shati and El Salaam neighborhoods.

On April 11, Khamis Abakar, the governor of West Darfur, enacted a two-week curfew in the region in an attempt to stop the violence. By April 13, Mohammed Hussein Timane, the leader of the Foro Baranga community council, stated that 24 civilians had been killed in the violence. Reprisal attacks had also spread to the town of Birkat Seira in North Darfur.

By April 15, El Salam and El Shati neighborhoods were burned to the ground, along with the neighborhoods of El Tadamon and El Medina el-Munawara.The neighborhoods were primarily inhabited by non-Arab refugees. Residents of Foro Baranga stated the attackers used 300 motorcycles and several camels to attack the city. At least 25 people were killed, with the death toll likely to be higher due to several parts of the city being inaccessible to humanitarian aid and medical services. Several people were kidnapped as well.

Sudanese transitional leader Abdel Fattah al-Burhan, vice-leader Hemedti, Darfur governor Minni Minnawi, and deputy governor Mohamed Eisa Aliyu convened on April 14 to discuss the clashes, and agreed to send Sudanese Army forces and Rapid Support Forces militiamen stationed in Central Darfur to quell the clashes. Little is known about the effect of this, as the 2023 Sudan conflict began the next day.

== Aftermath ==
By April 23, Rapid Support Forces militiamen controlled Foro Baranga.
