= Miisiirii language =

Language of western Sudan

Miisiirii
- Tamok
- Native to: Sudan, Chad
- Region: South Darfur, West Darfur, Wadi Fira
- Ethnicity: Tama
- Language family: Nilo-Saharan?: Eastern Sudanic; Northern Eastern; Taman; Miisiirii

Language codes
- ISO 639-3: (counted as Tama [tma])
- Glottolog: miis1236

Linguistic map of the non-Arab peoples of Darfur, showing the extent of the Taman languages in Sudan.

Miisiirii (also called Mileri or Jabal) is a language of western Sudan and Chad, spoken by the Mileri community of Jebel Mun (Jebel Moon) in Darfur who claim a dubious Messiria Arab descent, they also have a few speakers scattered in Chad.

Milerinkiya belongs to the Taman language family. It is often considered a dialect of Tama, though it is not particularly close.
