= Sungor =

Sungor may refer to:

- the Sungor people
- the Sungor language
