= Mararit =

Mararit may refer to:

- the Mararit people
- the Mararit language
