= Dar Erenga =

Dar Erenga دار أرنقا
- Interactive map of Dar Erenga
- Coordinates: 13°42′21″N 22°27′21″E
- Country: Sudan
- State: West Darfur
- Localities: Sirba, Kulbus

Government
  - Traditional Administration: Malik (Omda / Nazir)

Dar Erenga (دار أرنقا) is a historical and geographical region in West Darfur State, Sudan. Its territory is distributed between Sirba Locality and Kulbus Locality. Situated along the border between Chad and Sudan, it serves as the traditional homeland of the Erenga people.

== Geography ==
According to the 2008 Sudan Population and Housing Census, the administrative district corresponding to the region (Sirba District) recorded a population of 87,293. Geographically, Dar Erenga is located in western Sudan within West Darfur State; it is situated north of Dar Masalit, south of Dar Qimr, and southwest of Dar Jebel, and is bordered by the Republic of Chad to the west. Important urban and administrative centers include Kulbus and Sirba, West Darfur, which form an integral part of the region's geographical context.

The local population relies primarily on seasonal water sources and valleys, most notably Wadi Kaja in the east and Wadi Asunga in the west. Additional mapping and geographical delimitation of the Masalit Sultanate around 1900 are detailed in regional cartographic sources.

== Ethnic Composition ==
Historically and socially, Dar Erenga consists of a tribal confederation bringing together closely related ethnic sub-groups. These include the Awra (Oro), Asungor (Assangori), Mararit, Girga, Dula, and Shali (Erenga-Shali). Historically, the area situated on the eastern bank of Wadi Kaja was known as "Dar Shali" prior to its full integration into the broader geography of Dar Erenga. Additional administrative context regarding local governance is found in related historical analyses.

== History ==
In the late 19th century, during the reign of Sultan Abukr Ismail (c. 1889–1905), Dar Erenga was administratively incorporated into the sphere of the Masalit Sultanate. As documented in historical studies concerning local state formation in western Sudan, this period reflected regional administrative dynamics and local power structures. Additional context on regional livelihoods and social dynamics under stress is detailed in regional surveys.

The international boundaries defining the region were recognized internationally through the Anglo-French Boundary Conventions of 1919 and 1921. In 1953, under the Anglo-Egyptian agreement concerning self-government for Sudan, the region was officially designated as part of the Northern Dar Masalit electoral constituency.

During the Darfur conflict in the mid-2000s, villages inhabited by the Erenga population in the region, particularly around Sirba, were targeted in documented armed militia attacks, as recorded in human rights alerts issued by Amnesty International in January 2007 (UA 13/07, AFR 54/003/2007). During the Darfur conflict, villages in the region, particularly around Sirba and Suleia, faced attacks that resulted in civilian casualties, with Erenga tribal leaders recording numerous deaths, while United Nations and humanitarian assessment missions visited the area to evaluate the aftermath.

== Administrative units ==
- Administrative unit of Kandebi
- Administrative unit of Abu Suruj
- Administrative unit of Seraf Jidad
- Administrative unit of Bir Saliba

== See also ==
- Erenga people
- West Darfur
- Abu Suruj
- Sirba, West Darfur
- Bir Saliba (Soudan)
