= Mararit language =

Language of Chad and Sudan

Mararit
- Ebiri
- Native to: Chad, Sudan
- Region: Wadi Fira, Ouaddai
- Ethnicity: Mararit
- Native speakers: 93,000 (2023)
- Language family: Nilo-Saharan?: Eastern Sudanic; Northern Eastern; Taman; Mararit
- Dialects: Ibiri; Abu Charib

Language codes
- ISO 639-3: mgb
- Glottolog: mara1396
- Linguasphere: 05-PEA-aa

The Mararit language is a Taman language of the Eastern Sudanic branch spoken in eastern Chad and western Sudan. There are two dialects, Ibiri and Abou Charib, which Blench (2006) counts as distinct languages. The majority speak the Abou Charib dialect. Mararit is reportedly not mutually intelligible with Tama and Sungor despite being part of the same Taman language group.

Mararit people live in Argid Mararit, Abid Mararit, Wadah area, Donkey Kuma, Sani Kiro, in North Darfur State; in Silala area in South Darfur State and in Gienena province in West Darfur State. The Talgai, Mirakawi, Wilkawi, and Tirgawi are tribes of the Mararit people.

== Dialects ==
There are three dialects according to Rilly (2010:175):

- Mararit proper (autonyms: Ibiri, Abiri, Abiyi, Ebiri), spoken in Am Dam District, Chad. A minority is scattered in Sudan. Neighboring languages are Tama, spoken to the north, and Sungor, spoken to the south.
- Abu Sharib, spoken near Biltine, to the west of Mararit proper. It is intelligible with Mararit proper.
- Darnut, reported by Edgar (1991)
