= Qimr =

Qimr may refer to:

- Kimr people, an ethnic group in Sudan and Chad
- QIMR Berghofer, an Australian medical research institute
