= Erenga people =

Ethnic group of Sudan

Erenga
Barank

Regions with significant populations
- Sudan

Languages
- Sungor, Arabic

Religion
- Islam

Related ethnic groups
- Masalit, Mararit, Misseriya Jebel

The Erenga are an ethnic group of Sudan. They mainly reside in Kulbus province of West Darfur, where they number about 30% of the total population. The members of this group speak Sungor, a Nilo-Saharan language. Their population was estimated to be around 35,000 according to a 1996 source.

== Culture and Lifestyle ==
The Erenga are mainly pastoralists who raise goats, cattle, and camels. They also engage in subsistence agriculture. Most Erenga are Muslim.

The Erenga have a clan system where the Shali, Awra, and Girga clans are some of the most influential groups.

== History ==
During the Turco-Egyptian rule in western Sudan that followed the conquest of Darfur in 1874, the region experienced drastic shifts in the balance of power. Due to the harsh taxation and military pressure of the regime, the rulers and chiefs of the western frontier—including the leaders of the Erenga, Masalit, Zaghawa, Tama, and Jabal—were compelled to submit and accommodate Turkish camps established for collecting taxes. The region's history is closely tied to the uprising of Muhammad Zayn Abu Jumayza against the Mahdist State in late 1888, where mobilizations and movements in the surrounding areas formed a broad resistance front against Mahdist policies in Darfur, leveraging the natural and social stronghold of Dar Erenga.

The Erenga people have played a pivotal role in the political and social events of West Darfur. Notably, during the late 19th century and the resistance against the central Mahdist state policies in Darfur in 1888, the Dar Erenga region served as a vital geographical stronghold. The region's history has long been shaped by conflicts; scholars note that historical upheavals and humanitarian crises mirror the devastating wars and famines that tore through Darfur between 1888 and 1892 under Khalifa Abdullahi.

== See also ==
- Ardamata massacre, which included Erenga victims
- Dar Erenga
- Sirba
- Abu Suruj
