= 1919 revolution =

1919 Revolution can refer to:

- The Egyptian Revolution of 1919
- The German Revolution of 1918–1919 that began in November 1918
- The Bavarian Soviet Republic
- The Hungarian Soviet Republic
- The Greater Poland Uprising (1918–1919)
- The establishment of civilian government following the Finnish Civil War

== See also ==
- Revolutions of 1917–23
- Aftermath of World War I
- Occupation of İzmir
- List of sovereign states in 1919
- Category:Early Soviet republics
- Category:Conflicts in 1919
