= SJG =

SJG or sjg may refer to:

- Steve Jackson Games, an American game company
- Sungor language, Chad and Sudan; by ISO 639-3 code
