= List of sovereign states in the 1910s =

Map of the World in 1919

This is a list of sovereign states in the 1910s, giving an overview of states around the world during the period between 1 January 1910 and 31 December 1919. It contains entries, arranged alphabetically, with information on the status and recognition of their sovereignty. It includes 94 widely recognized sovereign states, and entities which were de facto sovereign but which were not widely recognized by other states.

== Sovereign states ==
Name and capital city	Information on status and recognition of sovereignty
=== A ===
→ Afghanistan – Emirate of Afghanistan; Capital: Kabul	De facto independent state that was a de jure British protectorate (to 8 August 1919). Widely recognized independent state (from 8 August 1919).
→ Albania (from 28 November 1912); Capital: Durrës: Independent Albania (from 12 November 1912 to 21 February 1914) Capital: Vlorë; Principality of Albania (from 21 February 1914)	Limited sovereignty for occupatio bellica by the Balkan League states. Recognized independent state from 29 July 1913. De facto Italian protectorate from 23 June 1917.
Andorra – Principality of Andorra; Capital: Andorra La Vella	Widely recognized independent state.
Angoche – Angoche Sultanate (to 1910); Capital: Angoche	Widely recognized independent state to 1910. Annexed by Portugal and integrated into Portuguese East Africa in 1910.
Argentina – Argentine Republic; Capital: Buenos Aires	Widely recognized independent state
Armenia – Republic of Armenia (from May 28, 1918); Capital: Yerevan	Widely recognized independent state from May 28, 1918.
Asir – Idrisid Emirate of Asir (from 1916); Capital: Sabya	De facto independent state until 1916. Widely recognized independent state from 1916.
Aussa – Sultanate of Aussa; Capital: Aussa	Widely recognized independent state.
Austria (from 12 November 1918); Capital: Vienna: Republic of German-Austria (from 12 November 1918 to 10 September 1919); Republic of Austria (from 10 September 1919)	Widely recognized independent state.
Austria-Hungary – Austro-Hungarian Monarchy (to 31 October 1918); Capital: Vienna and Budapest	Widely recognized independent state. Austria-Hungary had one concession: (Austria-Hungary) Tientsin (to 14 August 1917)
→ Azerbaijan – Azerbaijan Democratic Republic (from 28 May 1918); Capital: Ganja (to September, 1918), Baku (from September, 1918)	Widely recognized independent state.
=== B ===
Belgium – Kingdom of Belgium; Capital: Brussels	Widely recognized independent state. Belgium had one colony and one concession: Belgian Congo (Colony); (Belgium) Ruanda-Urundi (League of Nations Mandate from 6 May 1916); (Belgium) Tientsin (Concession)
Bhutan – Kingdom of Bhutan (to January 8, 1910); Capital: Thimphu	Widely recognized independent state.
Bolivia – Republic of Bolivia; Capital: Sucre	Widely recognized independent state.
Brazil – Republic of the United States of Brazil; Capital: Rio de Janeiro	Widely recognized independent state.
(Tsardom of Bulgaria (1908–1946)) Bulgaria – Tsardom of Bulgaria; Capital: Sofia	Widely recognized independent state.
=== C ===
→ Chile – Republic of Chile; Capital: Santiago	Widely recognized independent state.
→ → → China; Capital: Peking: Great Qing (to February 12, 1912); Republic of China (from January 1, 1912 to December 12, 1915); Empire of China (from December 12, 1915 to June 6, 1916); Republic of China (from June 6, 1916)	Widely recognized independent state to December 12, 1915, and from June 6, 1916.
Colombia – Republic of Colombia; Capital: Bogotá	Widely-recognized independent state.
Costa Rica– Republic of Costa Rica; Capital: San José	Widely recognized independent state.
Cuba – Republic of Cuba; Capital: Havana	Widely recognized independent state.
Czechoslovakia – Czechoslovak Republic (from October 28, 1918); Capital: Prague	Widely recognized independent state.
=== D ===
Dar al Kuti – Sultanate of Dar Al Kuti (to 1911); Capital: N'Délé	Widely recognized independent state.
Dar Gimr / Dar Kimr
Dar Masalit – Sultanate of Dar Masalit; Capital: El Geneina	Widely recognized independent state.
Dar Sila – Dar Sila Daju (to 1916)
Dar Tama
(Sultanate of Darfur) Darfur – Sultanate of Darfur (to 1916); Capital: El Fasher	Widely recognized independent state.
Denmark – Kingdom of Denmark; Capital: Copenhagen	Widely recognized independent state. Denmark had three colonies and one dependency: Danish West Indies (Colony to March 31, 1917); Faroe Islands (Colony); (Denmark) Greenland (Colony); (Denmark) Iceland (Dependency to December 1, 1918, associated state thereafter)
Dominican Republic – Second Dominican Republic; Capital: Santo Domingo	Widely recognized independent state. Under United States military occupation from May 5, 1916.
=== E ===
Ecuador – Republic of Ecuador; Capital: Quito	Widely recognized independent state.
→ El Salvador – Republic of El Salvador; Capital: San Salvador	Widely recognized independent state.
Estonia – Republic of Estonia (from February 24, 1918); Capital: Tallinn	Widely recognized independent state.
→ Ethiopia – Ethiopian Empire; Capital: Addis Ababa	Widely recognized independent state.
=== F ===
→ & Finland (from December 6, 1917); Capital: Helsinki: Kingdom of Finland (from December 6, 1917 to July 17, 1919); Republic of Finland (from July 17, 1919); Finnish Socialist Workers' Republic (from January 29 to May 5, 1918)	Widely recognized independent state.
France – French Republic; Capital: Paris	Widely recognized independent state. The following are colonies, concessions and protectorates of France: French Algeria (de jure Department of Metropolitan France, de facto Colony); (France) Territory of Cameroun (League of Nations Mandate, from 20 July 1916 (de facto)); French Comoros (Protectorate to 23 February 1914); French Congo (Colony to 15 January 1910); French Equatorial Africa (Federation of colonies from 15 January 1910); French Guiana (Colony); French India (Colony); French Indochina (Federation of colonies); French Madagascar (Colony, includes Comoros from 23 February 1914); French Morocco (Protectorate from 30 March 1912); French Oceania (Protectorate); French Somaliland (Colony); French Tunisia (Protectorate); French West Africa (Federation of colonies); Guadeloupe (Colony); Hankou (Concession); Martinique (Colony); Mayotte (Colony until 1912); New Caledonia (Colony); Réunion (Colony); Saint Pierre and Miquelon (Colony); Shanghai (Concession); Tientsin (Concession); Ubangi-Shari (Colony to 15 January 1910; from 12 April 1916)
=== G ===
Georgia – Democratic Republic of Georgia (from May 26, 1918); Capital: Tiflis	Widely recognized independent state. Immediately recognized by Germany and the Ottoman Empire.
Gowa – Sultanate of Gowa (to 1911); Capital: Jongaya	Widely recognized independent state until 1911. Annexed by the Dutch East Indies.
→ Germany; Capital: Berlin: Second German Empire (to November 9, 1918); Weimar Republic (from November 9, 1918)	Widely recognized independent state. The following are colonies, concessions and protectorates of Germany: German East Africa (colony to November 25, 1918); (German Empire) German Kiautschou (concession to November 7, 1914); German New Guinea (protectorate to June 28, 1919); (German Empire) German Samoa (protectorate); (German South West Africa) German South-West Africa (colony to June 28, 1919); (German Empire) Hankou (concession to August 1917); (German Empire) Kamerun (colony to July 20, 1916); (German Empire) Tientsin (concession to August 1917); (German Empire) Togoland (protectorate to August 26, 1914)
Greece – Kingdom of Greece; Capital: Athens	Widely recognized independent state.
Guatemala – Republic of Guatemala; Capital: Guatemala City	Widely recognized independent state.
=== H ===
Ha'il – Emirate of Jabal Shammar; Capital: Ha'il	Widely recognized independent state.
Haiti – Republic of Haiti; Capital: Port-au-Prince	Widely recognized independent state. Under United States military occupation from July 28, 1915.
→ Hejaz – Hashemite Kingdom of Hejaz (from June 10, 1916); Capital: Mecca	Widely recognized independent state.
Honduras – Republic of Honduras; Capital: Tegucicalpa	Widely recognized independent state.
→ → → Hungary (from November 16, 1918); Capital: Budapest: Hungarian People's Republic (from November 16, 1918 to March 21, 1919); Hungarian Soviet Republic (from March 21 to August 1, 1919); Hungarian People's Republic (from August 1 to 8, 1919); Hungarian Republic (from August 8, 1919)	Unrecognized state from August 1 to 8, 1919. Widely-recognized state from September 10, 1919.
=== I ===
Italy – Kingdom of Italy; Capital: Rome	Widely recognized independent state. Italy had four colonies and three concessions: (Kingdom of Italy) Amoy (Concession); Italian Cyrenaica (Colony, from November 5, 1911); (Kingdom of Italy) Italian Eritrea (Colony); (Kingdom of Italy) Italian Somaliland (Colony); Italian Tripolitania (Colony, from November 5, 1911); (Kingdom of Italy) Shanghai (Concession); (Kingdom of Italy) Tientsin (Concession)
=== J ===
Japan – Empire of Japan; Capital: Tokyo City	Widely recognized independent state. Japan had sovereignty over the following protectorates, dependencies and concessions: (Empire of Japan) Chongqing (Concession); (Empire of Japan) Hangzhou (Concession); (Empire of Japan) Hankou (Concession); (Korean Empire) Joseon (Protectorate to August 29, 1910); (Empire of Japan) Chōsen (Dependency from August 29, 1910); (Empire of Japan) Karafuto (Dependency); (Empire of Japan) Kwantung (Concession); (Empire of Japan) Shashi (Concession); (Empire of Japan) Suzhou (Concession); (Empire of Japan) Taiwan (Dependency); (Empire of Japan) Tientsin (Concession); Japan administered one League of Nations mandate: South Seas Mandate (LON mandate from June 28, 1919)
=== K ===
Kasanje – Jaga Kingdom (to 1910); Capital: Not specified	Widely recognized independent state until 1910. Annexed by Portugal and incorporated into Portuguese Angola in 1910.
=== L ===
& Latvia (disputed between two governments) (from November 18, 1918) Capital: Riga, Dvinsk, and Rezhitsa: Republic of Latvia (from November 18, 1918) Capital: Riga; Latvian Socialist Soviet Republic (from December 17, 1918)	Widely recognized independent state.
Liberia – Republic of Liberia; Capital: Monrovia	Widely recognized independent state.
Liechtenstein – Principality of Liechtenstein; Capital: Vaduz	Widely recognized independent state.
→ & Lithuania (from February 16, 1918); Capital: Vilnius: Kingdom of Lithuania (from March 23 to November 2, 1918); Lithuanian Soviet Socialist Republic (from December 16, 1918, to February 27, 1919); Republic of Lithuania (from February 16, 1918)	Widely recognized independent state.
Luxembourg – Grand Duchy of Luxembourg (to August 1914, from November 11, 1918); Capital: Luxembourg City	Widely recognized independent state. Limited sovereignty for occupation.
=== M ===
Mbundaland – Mbunda Kingdom (to 1917); Capital: Lumbala N'guimbo	Widely recognized independent state.
→ Mexico – United Mexican States; Capital: Mexico City	Widely recognized independent state. Mexico had one territory: (Mexico) → (Mexico) Isla de la Pasión (Uninhabited territory)
Monaco – Principality of Monaco; Capital: Monaco	Widely recognized independent state.
→ Montenegro (to November 28, 1918); Capital: Cetinje: Principality of Montenegro (to August 28, 1910); Kingdom of Montenegro (from August 28, 1910 to November 28, 1918)	Widely recognized independent state. Limited sovereignty for occupatio bellica to December 1, 1918.
Morocco – Sultanate of Morocco (to March 30, 1912); Capital: Fes	De jure sovereign state under French and Spanish protectorate from March 30, 1912.
Mountain Republic - Mountainous Republic of the Northern Caucasus (from 11 May, 1918 to September 1919); Capital: Temir-Khan-Shura	Widely-recognized short lived state.
=== N ===
Najran – Principality of Najran; Capital: Najran	Widely recognized independent state.
Ndzuwani – Ndzuwani Sultanate (to July 25, 1912); Capital: Domoni	Widely recognized independent state until July 25, 1912. Annexed by France and incorporated into French Madagascar on July 25, 1912.
→ Riyadh / Nejd; Capital: Riyadh: Emirate of Riyadh (to 1913); Emirate of Nejd and Hasa (from 1913)	Widely recognized independent state.
Netherlands – Kingdom of the Netherlands; Capital: Amsterdam	Widely recognized independent state. The Netherlands had sovereignty over three colonies: Curaçao and Dependencies; Dutch East Indies; Surinam
Nicaragua – Republic of Nicaragua; Capital: Managua	Widely recognized independent state. Under United States military occupation from 1912.
Nri – Kingdom of Nri (to 1911); Capital: Igbo-Ukwu	Widely recognized independent state.
Norway – Kingdom of Norway; Capital: Oslo	Widely recognized independent state. Norway had three uninhabited possessions: (Norway) Bouvet Island; (Norway) Peter I Island; (Norway) Sverdrup Islands
=== O ===
Ottoman Empire – Sublime Ottoman State; Capital: Constantinople	Widely recognized independent state. Ottoman Empire had one protectorate: North Caucasian Emirate (from September 1919)
Ouaddai – Sultanate of Ouaddai (to 1912); Capital: Abeche	Widely recognized independent state.
=== P ===
Panama – Republic of Panama; Capital: Panama City	Widely recognized independent state.
Paraguay – Republic of Paraguay; Capital: Asunción	Widely recognized independent state.
Persia – Persian Empire; Capital: Tehran	Widely recognized independent state.
Peru; Capital: Lima: Aristocratic Republic (to May 19, 1919); Peruvian Republic (from May 19, 1919)	Widely recognized independent state.
Poland (from January 14, 1917); Capital: Warsaw: Kingdom of Poland (from January 14, 1917 to November 11, 1918); Republic of Poland (from November 11, 1918)	Client / Puppet state of Germany until November 11, 1918. Widely recognized independent state from November 11, 1918.
→ Portugal; Capital: Lisbon: Kingdom of Portugal (to October 5, 1910); Portuguese Republic (from October 5, 1910)	Widely recognized independent state. The following are colonies, vassal state and possession of Portugal: → Portuguese Cape Verde (Colony); Kongo (Vassal state to 1914); → Portuguese Macau (Colony); → Portuguese East Africa (Colony); → Portuguese Guinea (Colony); → Portuguese India (Colony); → Portuguese Timor (Colony); → Portuguese West Africa (Colony); → Fort of São João Baptista de Ajudá (Possession); → Portuguese São Tomé and Príncipe (Colony)
Powo – Kingdom of Powo (to 1919); Capital: Kanam (now Galang Village, Bomê County)	Widely recognized independent state until 1919.
=== R ===
Romania – Kingdom of Romania; Capital: Bucharest	Widely recognized independent state.
→ → → Russia; Capital: Saint Petersburg: Russian Empire (to March 15, 1917); Russian Provisional Government (from March 15 to September 14, 1917); Russian Republic (from September 14, 1917 to January 18, 1918); Russian Democratic Federal Republic (from January 18, 1918 to January 19, 1918); Russian Socialist Federative Soviet Republic (from January 25, 1918)	Widely recognized independent state. Russia had three protectorates, one concession and one autonomous grand duchy: Bukhara (Protectorate); Khiva (Protectorate); Uryankhay (Protectorate from April 17, 1914); Tientsin (Concession); Finland (Autonomous grand duchy to December 6, 1917)
=== S ===
San Marino – Most Serene Republic of San Marino; Capital: San Marino	Widely recognized independent state.
→ Serbia / Serbs, Croats and Slovenes; Capital: Belgrade: Kingdom of Serbia (to December 1, 1918); Kingdom of Serbs, Croats and Slovenes (from December 1, 1918)	Widely recognized independent state. Limited sovereignty for occupatio bellica to December 1, 1918.
Setul Mambang Segara – Kingdom of Setul Mambang Segara (to 1916); Capital: Kota Mambang Segara	Widely recognized independent state.
→ (Thailand) → Siam – Kingdom of Siam; Capital: Bangkok	Widely recognized independent state.
Spain – Kingdom of Spain; Capital: Madrid	Widely recognized independent state. Spain had three colonies, one protectorate and two possessions: (Spain) Elobey, Annobón and Corisco (Colony); (Spain) Fernando Poo (Colony); (Spain) Río Muni (Colony); Spanish Morocco (Protectorate from November 27, 1912); (Spain) Spanish North Africa (Possession); Spanish Sahara (Possession)
Sulu – Sultanate of Sulu (to 1915); Capital: Jolo	Widely recognized independent state.
Sweden – Kingdom of Sweden; Capital: Stockholm	Widely recognized independent state.
Switzerland – Swiss Confederation; Capital: Bern	Widely recognized independent state.
=== T ===
Transcaucasia – Transcaucasian Democratic Federative Republic (from February 22 to May 28, 1918); Capital: Tiflis	Widely recognized independent state.
=== U ===
United Kingdom – United Kingdom of Great Britain and Ireland; Capital: London	Widely recognized independent state. The United Kingdom consisted of 4 constituent countries: England, Ireland, Scotland and Wales. The UK had sovereignty over the following autonomous dominions: Australia including territories: Territory of New Guinea from 1914); (Australia) Norfolk Island (from 1 July 1914); Papua; Canada; Newfoundland; New Zealand including territories: (New Zealand) Cook Islands; (New Zealand) Niue Island; → South Africa (from May 31, 1910) including one territory: → South West Africa from 9 July 1915); The following are colonies, concessions, territories, dependencies and protectorates of the United Kingdom: (United Kingdom) Aden (Protectorate); Afghanistan (Protectorate under Treaty of Gandamak to August 8, 1919); (United Kingdom) Amoy (Concession); Anglo-Egyptian Sudan (Condominium of the United Kingdom and the Khedivate/Sultanate of Egypt); (United Kingdom) Ascension Island (Possession); Ashanti (Protectorate); Bahama Islands (Crown colony); Bahrain (Protectorate); (United Kingdom) Baker Island (Uninhabited possession); Barbados (Crown colony); (United Kingdom) Barotziland–North-Western Rhodesia (Protectorate to August 17, 1911); (United Kingdom) Basutoland (Crown colony); (United Kingdom) Bechuanaland (Protectorate); → Bermuda (Crown colony); Bhutan (Independent state under Treaty of Punakha from January 8, 1910); British Ceylon (Crown colony); British Cyprus (Protectorate to 1914; Unilaterally annexed military occupation from 1914); British East Africa (Protectorate); → British Guiana (Colony); → British Honduras (Crown colony); British Hong Kong (Crown colony); British Jamaica (Crown colony); British Leeward Islands (Crown colony); British Mauritius (Crown colony); British Somaliland (Crown colony); British Trinidad and Tobago (Crown colony); British Windward Islands (Crown colony); Brunei (Protectorate); Cape Colony (Colony to May 31, 1910); (United Kingdom) Chinde (Concession); Colony of Natal (Colony to May 31, 1910); Egypt (Protectorate from December 18, 1914); Falkland Islands (Crown colony); Federated Malay States (Protectorate); Gambia (Crown colony and protectorate); Gibraltar (Crown colony); Gold Coast (Crown colony); (United Kingdom) Graham Land (Uninhabited possession); Guernsey (Crown dependency); (United Kingdom) Hankou (Concession); (United Kingdom) Heard Island and McDonald Islands (Uninhabited possession); India - Indian Empire (Crown colony); (United Kingdom) Isle of Man (Crown dependency); (United Kingdom) Jarvis Island (Uninhabited possession); Jersey (Crown dependency); (United Kingdom) Jiujiang (Concession); → Kuwait (Protectorate); Maldive Islands (Protectorate); Malta (Crown colony); Nepal (Protectorate); Nigeria (Crown colony and protectorate from January 1, 1914); North Borneo (Protectorate); Northern Nigeria (Protectorate to January 1, 1914); (United Kingdom) North-Eastern Rhodesia (Protectorate to August 17, 1911); (United Kingdom) Northern Rhodesia (Colony from August 17, 1911); Northern Territories of the Gold Coast (Protectorate); → → Nyasaland (Protectorate); Orange River Colony (Colony to May 31, 1910); Qatar (Protectorate from November 3, 1916); (United Kingdom) Redonda (Possession); Rhodesia (Company rule by British South Africa Company); Saint Helena (Crown colony); Sarawak (Protectorate); Seychelles (Crown colony); → Sierra Leone (Crown colony and protectorate); → Sikkim (Independent state under the Treaty of Tumlong); (United Kingdom) South Orkney Islands (Uninhabited possession); (United Kingdom) South Shetland Islands (Uninhabited possession); Southern Nigeria (Protectorate to January 1, 1914); Straits Settlements (Crown colony); (United Kingdom) Suez Canal Zone (Crown colony); (United Kingdom) Swaziland (Protectorate); (United Kingdom) Tanganyika Territory (League of Nations Mandate from 1916); (United Kingdom) Tientsin (Concession); Transvaal Colony (Colony to May 31, 1910); (United Kingdom) Tristan da Cunha (Crown colony); Trucial States (Protectorate); Unfederated Malay States; Johor (Protectorate from 1914); → Kedah (Protectorate); Kelantan (Protectorate); Perlis (Protectorate); Terengganu (Protectorate); (United Kingdom) → Uganda (Protectorate); (United Kingdom) Union Islands (Protectorate until 29 February 1916 to become Colony); (United Kingdom) Victoria Land (Uninhabited possession); Weihai (Concession); Zanzibar (Protectorate); (United Kingdom) Zhenjiang (Concession)
→ United States – United States of America; Capital: Washington, D.C.	Widely recognized independent state. The following are territories of the United States of America: → (United States) Alaska (District to August 24, 1912; Territory from August 24, 1912); → (United States) American Samoa (Territory); Arizona (Territory to February 14, 1912); → (United States) Bajo Nuevo Bank (Uninhabited territory); → (United States) Corn Islands (Territory); → (United States) Guam (Territory); Hawaii (Territory); → (United States) Howland Island (Uninhabited territory); → (United States) Johnston Atoll (Uninhabited territory); → (United States) Kingman Reef (Uninhabited territory); → (United States) Middlebrook Island (Uninhabited territory); → (United States) Midway Atoll (Uninhabited territory); → (United States) Navassa Island (Uninhabited territory); New Mexico (Territory to January 6, 1912); (United States) → (United States) Palmyra Atoll (Territory); → (United States) → Panama Canal Zone (Territory); → (United States) Philippine Islands (Territory); → Puerto Rico (Territory); → (United States) Quita Sueño Bank (Uninhabited territory); → (United States) Roncador Bank (Uninhabited territory); → (United States) Serrana Bank (Uninhabited territory); → (United States) Serranilla Bank (Uninhabited territory); → (United States) Swan Islands (Uninhabited territory); → (United States) U.S. Virgin Islands (Territory from March 31, 1917); → (United States) Veracruz (Occupation from April 21 to November 23, 1914); → (United States) Wake Island (Uninhabited territory)
Upper Asir - Sheikdom of Upper Asir (from August 1916); Capital: Abha	Widely recognized independent state.
Uruguay – Eastern Republic of Uruguay; Capital: Montevideo	Widely recognized independent state.
=== V ===
Venezuela – United States of Venezuela; Capital: Caracas	Widely recognized independent state.
=== W ===
Wadai – Wadai Empire (to 1912); Capital: Abéché	Widely recognized independent state until 1912. Annexed by France and incorporated into French Chad in 1912.
=== Y ===
Yemen – Mutawakkilite Kingdom of Yemen (from October 30, 1918); Capital: Sana`a	Widely recognized independent state.
== States with limited independence, sovereignty or recognition == Excluded from the list above are the following noteworthy entities which either were not fully sovereign or did not claim to be independent:
Alash – Alash Autonomy (from December 13, 1917); Capital: Alash-Qala	Unrecognized state.
Alsace-Lorraine – Alsace-Lorraine Soviet Republic (from November 10 to 22, 1918); Capital: Straßburg	Unrecognized socialist state created during the German Revolution after the World War I.
Altai – Confederated Republic of Altai (from March 1918); Capital: Gorno-Altaysk	Unrecognized state.
Aras – Republic of Aras (from December 1918 to June 1919); Capital: Nakhchivan	Unrecognized state.
Australia – Commonwealth of Australia; Capital: Melbourne	Dominion of the British empire. Australia was a federation of six states and three internal territories. (Note: 6 States: New South Wales, Queensland, South Australia, Tasmania, Victoria, Western Australia. 3 internal territories: Australian Capital Territory (from January 1, 1911), Jervis Bay Territory (from 1915), Northern Territory (from January 1, 1911.) Australia was an autonomous British Dominion but dependent from the United Kingdom and not fully sovereign. Following the Imperial War Conference in 1918 Australia gradually began to show signs associated with independence and recognition, though was still widely considered to belong to the UK. Australia had two external territories: Territory of New Guinea from 1914); (Australia) Norfolk Island (from 1 July 1914); Papua
Baku Commune – 26 Baku Commissars (from April 1918 to July 1918) Capital: Baku	Unrecognized entity.
Banat Republic (from October 31, 1918 to February 20, 1919); Capital: Timișoara	Unrecognized state. Client state of the Hungarian People's Republic to November 1918. Client state of the Kingdom of Serbs, Croats and Slovenes from November 1918.
→ Bavaria; Capital: Munich: People's State of Bavaria (from November 8, 1918 to April 6, 1919); Bavarian Soviet Republic (from April 6 to May 3, 1919)	Unrecognized socialist state created during the German Revolution after the World War I.
→ Belarus; Capital: Minsk: Belarusian People's Republic – (from March 9 to December 1918) Capital: Minsk, Vilna, and Grodno; Socialist Soviet Republic of Byelorussia (from January 1 to February 17, 1919)	Partially-recognized state from 1918 to 1919. Puppet/Buffer State of Soviet Russia from January 1, 1919.
Bottleneck – Free State of Bottleneck (from January 10, 1919); Capital: Lorch	Unoccupied territory within post-World War I Germany.
Bremen – Bremen Soviet Republic (from January 10 to February 4, 1919); Capital: Bremen	Unrecognized socialist state created during the German Revolution after the World War I.
Canada – Dominion of Canada; Capital: Ottawa	Canada was autonomous but dependent of the United Kingdom. Following the Imperial War Conference in 1918 Canada gradually began to show signs associated with independence and recognition, though was not considered fully sovereign or independent.
Central Albania – Republic of Central Albania (from October 16, 1913 to March 7, 1914); Capital: Durrës	Unrecognized state.
Centrocaspian Dictatorship – Centro-Caspian Dictatorship (from August 1 to September 15, 1918); Capital: Baku	Unrecognized state.
Courland and Semigallia – Duchy of Courland and Semigallia (from March 8 to September 22, 1918); Capital: Riga	Client state of Germany.
Crete – Cretan State (de jure to December 1, 1913); Capital: Chania	De jure autonomous state of the Ottoman Empire to December 1, 1913. De facto unilaterally annexed by Greece.
→ Crimea; Capital: Bakhchysarai: Crimean People's Republic (from December 1917 to January 1918); Crimea – Crimean Socialist Soviet Republic (from May to June 1919)	Self-proclaimed autonomy of the Russian Democratic Federative Republic.
Don – Don Republic (from May 18, 1918); Capital: Novocherkassk	Unrecognized state.
Donbas and Kryvbas – Donets-Krivoy Rog Soviet Republic (from February 12 to March 20, 1918); Capital: Kharkiv	Unrecognized, self-declared state.
Hutsul Republic (from January 8 to June 11, 1919); Capital: Yasinia	Unrecognized state.
Icaria – Free State of Icaria (from July 18 to November 1912); Capital: Icaria	Unrecognized state.
Iceland – Iceland (from December 1, 1918); Capital: Reykjavík	Associated state under a personal union with Denmark. Largely dependent from Denmark.
Idel-Ural – Idel-Ural State (from March 1, 1918 to April 1918); Capital: Ufa	Semi-Independent state.
Ireland – Irish Republic (from January 21, 1919); Capital: Dublin	Revolutionary state.
Kars Republic – Provisional National Government of the Southwestern Caucasus (from December 1, 1918 to April 1919); Capital: Kars	Nominally-independent provisional government.
Kokand – Turkestan Autonomy (from November 27, 1917 to February 22, 1918); Capital: Kokand	Unrecognized state.
Komancza – Komancza Republic (from November 4, 1918 to January 24, 1919); Capital: Komańcza	Microstate.
Korea, Provisional Government of – Provisional Government of the Republic of Korea (from April 11, 1919); Capital-in-exile: Shanghai	Partially recognized Korean government-in-exile.
Kuban – Kuban People's Republic (from January 28, 1918); Capital: Yekaterinodar	Unrecognized state.
Lemko Republic – Lemko-Rusyn People's Republic (from December 5, 1918); Capital: Florynka	Unrecognized state from December 5, 1918.
Lithuania-Byelorussia – Lithuanian-Byelorussian Soviet Socialist Republic (from February 17 to July 17, 1919); Capital: Vilnius, Minsk, and Smolensk	Soviet puppet state from February 17 to July 17, 1919.
Commune of the Working People of Estonia (from November 29, 1918 to June 5, 1919); Capital: Narva	Soviet puppet state in temporarily occupied parts of eastern Estonia in 1918-1919.
Moldova – Moldavian Democratic Republic (from December 15, 1917 to December 10, 1918); Capital: Argyrokastron	Unrecognized state.
Mongolia - Great Mongolian State (from December 29, 1911 to June 17, 1915); Capital: Niislel Khuree	Mostly unrecognised state. Autonomous state of China under Russian influence from 1915, under Chinese occupation from 1919.
Muscat and Oman – Sultanate of Muscat and Oman; Capital: Muscat	De jure independent state. De facto a British protectorate.
Newfoundland – Dominion of Newfoundland; Capital: St. John's	Dominion of the British Empire. Newfoundland was autonomous but dependent from the United Kingdom. Following the Imperial War Conference in 1918 New Zealand gradually began to show signs associated with independence and recognition, but was not considered fully sovereign or independent.
New Zealand – Dominion of New Zealand; Capital: Wellington	Dominion of the British Empire. New Zealand was autonomous but dependent from the United Kingdom. Following the Imperial War Conference in 1918 Newfoundland gradually began to show signs associated with independence and recognition, but was not considered fully sovereign or independent. The following are dependent territories of New Zealand: (New Zealand) Cook Islands; (New Zealand) Niue Island
Northern Epirus – Autonomous Republic of Northern Epirus (from February 28 to May 17, 1914); Capital: Argyrokastron	Unrecognized, self-declared independent state. Autonomy under nominal (unimplemented) Albanian sovereignty from May 17, 1914; de facto under Greek administration from October 27, 1914.
North Caucasian Emirate (from September 1919); Capital: Temir-Khan-Shura	Ottoman protectorate, incorporated into Mountain Autonomous Soviet Socialist Republic.
North Ingria – Republic of North Ingria (from January 23, 1919); Capital: Kirjasalo	Unrecognized state.
Oman – Imamate of Oman (from 1913); Capital: Nizwa	Unrecognized state.
Odessa – Odessa Soviet Republic (from January 17 to March 13, 1918); Capital: Odessa	Puppet state of Soviet Russia.
Perloja – Republic of Perloja (from November 1918)	Unrecognized state.
Slovakia: Slovakia – Slovak People's Republic (from December 11 1918 to December 29 1918) Capital: Košice; Slovakia – Slovak Soviet Republic (from June 16 to July 7, 1919) Capital: Prešov	Puppet state of the Hungarian Soviet Republic.
→ South Africa – Union of South Africa (from May 31, 1910); Capital: Pretoria	Dominion of the British empire from May 31, 1910. South Africa was autonomous but dependent from the United Kingdom. Following the Imperial War Conference in 1918 South Africa gradually began to show signs associated with independence and recognition, though was not considered fully independent or sovreign. South Africa has one possession: → South West Africa from 9 July 1915)
Slovenes, Croats and Serbs – State of Slovenes, Croats and Serbs (from October 29 to December 1, 1918); Capital: Zagreb	Unrecognized provisional government.
Syria – Arab Kingdom of Syria (from November 26, 1919); Capital: Damascus	De facto independent state not recognized by any other state.
Tarnobrzeg – Republic of Tarnobrzeg (from November 6, 1918, to spring 1919); Capital: Tarnobrzeg	Unrecognized state.
Tibet (from 1912); Capital: Lhasa	Largely unrecognized de facto independent state. Claimed by the Republic of China.
Tripolitania – Tripolitanian Republic (from November 16, 1918 to July 12, 1919, from November 1919); Capital: ‘Aziziya	Unrecognized state.
Uhtua – Republic of Uhtua (from June 21, 1918); Capital: Uhtua	Unrecognized state.
Ukraine (separated into several governments): Ukrainian People's Republic of Soviets (from December 25, 1917 to March 1918) Capital: Kharkiv; Ukrainian People's Republic (from January 22, 1918) Capital: Kyiv; Ukrainian State (from April 29 to December 14, 1918) Capital: Kyiv; West Ukrainian People's Republic (from November 1, 1918 to January 22, 1919) Capital: Lviv, Ternopil, Stanislaviv, and Zalishchyky
Uryankhay – Uryankhay Republic (from December 1, 1911 to April 17, 1914); Capital: Belotsarsk	Self-declared independent state.
Western Thrace – Independent Government of Western Thrace (from August 31 to October 25, 1913); Capital: Komotini	Unrecognized state.
Würzburg – Würzburg Soviet Republic (from April 7 to 9, 1919); Capital: Würzburg	Unrecognized socialist state created during the German Revolution after World War I.
Zaian Confederation (from 1914); Capital: Khénifra	Unrecognized resistance "counter-state" against French forces in French Morocco.
Zakopane – Republic of Zakopane (from October 13 to November 16, 1918); Capital: Zakopane	Unrecognized state.
