= Mohammed Abdalla Aldoma =

Sudanese lawyer and politician

President of the National Umma Party
- Incumbent
- Assumed office June 6, 2024 (disputed with Fadlallah Burma Nasser and Al-Wathaq al-Barir)
- Preceded by: Fadlallah Burma Nasser

Governor of West Darfur
- In office July 23, 2020 – June 13, 2021
- Preceded by: Abdelkhalig Badawi
- Succeeded by: Khamis Abakar

Personal details
- Party: National Umma Party
- Occupation: Lawyer

Military service
- Allegiance: Sudanese Armed Forces (2023-present)

Mohammed Abdalla Aldoma (Arabic: محمد عبد الله الدوما), also transliterated Mohammed Abdalla Al-Douma, is a Sudanese lawyer and politician who currently serves as the head of the National Umma Party. Aldoma served as Governor of West Darfur from 2020 to 2021, and previously as an opposition leader to dictator Omar al-Bashir.

== Biography ==
Aldoma is a lawyer, and worked in the Darfur Bar Association in 2009. By 2012, he was President of the Darfur Bar Association.

Aldoma was a notable dissident under Omar al-Bashir. He was the deputy chairman of the National Umma Party. In 2011, he was the head of the party for a brief period of time. On July 1, 2012, he was arrested by Bashir's government in Khartoum and tortured. He was arrested again in 2018 and detained at Shala Prison in North Darfur.

=== Governorship ===
Aldoma was appointed Governor of West Darfur on July 23, 2020 among the removal of Bashir-era governors after the Juba Peace Agreement and Sudanese revolution. Aldoma is the first civilian-appointed governor of the state. Under Aldoma's tenure, conflict between Arabs and non-Arabs intensified in the state instigated by the Rapid Support Forces. In an interview with The New Humanitarian, Aldoma said that he had removed Bashir-era local National Congress Party (NCP) officials from power, and said that they were among those stoking tensions that led to the Krinding massacre where over 160 people were killed. Aldoma also called for investigations by the post-revolution Sudanese government into war crimes committed during the War in Darfur.

In the Krinding massacre, Aldoma's residence was attacked by Janjaweed militias backed by the RSF. He was unharmed, and the attempt to break-in failed. Aldoma criticized Prime Minister Abdalla Hamdok and local Sudanese Army forces for their slow reaction to the massacre. In March 2021, he acknowledged that West Darfur's state security apparatus had completely collapsed.

In April 2021, when ethnic clashes fomented into a massacre in El Geneina yet again, Aldoma accused militias coming in from neighboring countries as perpetrators of the violence. After a visit by Sudanese Armed Forces commander Abdel Fattah al-Burhan that was not announced to Aldoma, Aldoma said that there had been a breakdown in communication between West Darfur and the Sudanese government in Khartoum. Aldoma was replaced as governor by Khamis Abakar in June 2021.

=== Post-governorship ===
By January 2023, Aldoma was again the head of the Darfur Bar Association. Early on that year, he accused the Sudanese Army of distributing weapons to tribes and perpetuating tribal conflicts, particularly in South Darfur.

=== National Umma Party ===
By June 2024, Aldoma was the acting president of the NUP. The party had undergone a split after the creation of the RSF-aligned Soumoud alliance, where party head Fadlallah Burma Nasser announced his support for the RSF. Burma was expelled as president officially by the NUP in February 2025, but continued to claim that his faction of the NUP was the correct one. Burma's dismissal from the party effectively split the party between pro-RSF and pro-Sudanese Army factions. By 2026, a third faction had broken from the NUP led by Al-Wathaq al-Barir, the party's secretary general. Al-Barir's faction is anti-war.

In January 2026, Aldoma took part in the formation of the Watan political alliance, alongside the National Current Party, the Federal Gathering Party - General Secretariat Faction, National Unionist Party, and Ba'ath Party among others. The Watan alliance is pro-army.
