= Jebel Moon =

Town in West Darfur, Sudan

Jebel Moon جبل مون
- Location in Sudan
- Coordinates: 14°8′39″N 22°42′32″E
- Country: Sudan
- State: West Darfur
- Time zone: Central Africa Time, GMT + 3
- Geocode: 369723

Jebel Moon (Arabic: جبل مون) or Jebel Mun is a locality in West Darfur, Sudan.

== History ==
In April 2010, the Sudanese government took Jebel Moon from the rebel Justice and Equality Movement, killing 108 rebels and capturing 61 in the process. Jebel Moon had been a key rebel stronghold and its capture made the rebels fracture into small groups.

Following the 2021 Darfur clashes, refugees from Jebel Moon fled and settled in Foro Baranga. This was following fighting between nomads and farmers. Many women and children sought refuge in neighbouring Chad.

On 2 July 2026, the Sudanese Armed Forces (SAF) and allied Darfur militias reportedly recaptured Jebel Moon.

== Geography ==
Jebel Moon is located in a mountainous region. Jebel Moon is rich in precious metals, including uranium, chromium, and gold.

== Demographics ==
Herding and agriculture are the main activities of the Jebel Moon populace. In 2021 the population was approximately 68,500 among which more than 46,600 depended on humanitarian aid. The residents speak the Miisiirii language. The inhabitants of Jebel Moon, including the Misseriya tribe, and other ethnic groups.
