= Taman languages =

Family of African languages

Taman
- Tamaic
- Geographic distribution: Chad, Sudan
- Linguistic classification: Nilo-Saharan?: Eastern Sudanic; Northern Eastern; Taman
- Proto-language: Proto-Taman
- Subdivisions: Mararit; Miisiirii; Tama–Sungor

Language codes
- Glottolog: tama1329

Linguistic map of the non-Arab peoples of Darfur, showing the extent of the Taman languages in Sudan.

The Taman or Tamaic languages form a putative branch of the Eastern Sudanic language family spoken in Chad and Sudan, though Glottolog notes that "no conclusive, methodologically sound basis for assigning Tama to Eastern Sudanic" has been presented.

The languages are:

- Tama
  - Mararit (Ibiri, Abu Charib)
    - Miisiirii
    - Tama–Sungor
      - Sungor
      - Tama (Damut)

Claude Rilly (2010) includes reconstructions for Proto-Taman.

== See also ==
- List of Northern Eastern Sudanic reconstructions (Wiktionary)
