= Darfur Network For Human Rights =

Human rights organization

Darfur Network For Human Rights (DNHR), formerly known as Darfur Network For Monitoring and Documentation (DNMD) is a non-governmental organization involved in protecting and documenting human rights violations in Darfur and across Sudan. The organization is based in Kampala, Uganda.

== History ==
In June 2014, Darfur Network For Monitoring and Documentation (DMND) was formed by a group of local human rights activists in Darfur to address pressing human rights violations in the region.

In December 2020, DNMD registered as a national NGO to expand their reach across Sudan.

== Activities ==
The organization's activities include reporting human rights crimes, compiling evidence and documentation.
