= Sungor people =

Sungor or Asungor is an ethnic group in Chad. They speak Assangori, a Nilo-Saharan language. They numbered at least 60,000 according to a 1996 source.

== Culture ==
The Sungor are mainly pastoralists who raise goats, camels, and cattle. They also engage in subsistence agriculture.

Majority of the Sungor are Muslim.
