= Tama language =

Nilo-Saharan language spoken in Chad and Sudan

Tama
- Tamok
- Native to: Chad, Sudan
- Region: Wadi Fira, West Darfur, South Darfur
- Ethnicity: Tama, Kimr
- Native speakers: 460,000 (2022–2023)
- Language family: Nilo-Saharan?: Eastern Sudanic; Northern Eastern; Taman; Tama–Sungor; Tama
- Dialects: Tama; Orra; Girga; Haura; Murase; Mileere; Madungore

Language codes
- ISO 639-3: tma
- Glottolog: tama1331
- Linguasphere: 05-DAA-aa

Linguistic map of the non-Arab peoples of Darfur, showing the extent of the Taman languages in Sudan.

Tama, or Tamok, is the primary language spoken by the Tama people in Ouaddai, eastern Chad and in Darfur, western Sudan. It is a Taman language which belongs to the Eastern Sudanic branch of the Nilo-Saharan language family. Miisiirii is often considered a dialect, though it is not particularly close.

== Demographics ==
Tama is spoken by 63,000 people in Dar Tama, a well irrigated area near Guéréda that extends from Kebkebiya village to nearby Sudan. There are two nearly identical dialects, one spoken in the northern and central areas, and another one spoken in the south.

== Phonology ==
=== Consonants ===
		Labial	Dental	Alveolar	Retroflex	Palatal	Velar	Glottal
Stop	voiceless		t̪				k	
Stop	voiced	b	d̪			ɟ	g	
Stop	implosive	ɓ	ɗ̪					
Fricative		f		s		ʃ		h
Nasal		m		n		ɲ	ŋ	
Rhotic				r	ɽ			
Lateral				l	ɭ			
Approximant		w				j		

=== Vowels ===
	+ATR			-ATR		
	Front	Central	Back	Front	Central	Back
Close	i		u	ɪ		ʊ
Mid	e		o	ɛ		ɔ
Open		ʌ̈			a	

Vowel length is also distinctive.
