= Mararit people =

Ethnic group from Chad and Sudan

Mararit
Ibilak

Total population
- 93,000

Regions with significant populations
- Sudan and Chad

Languages
- Mararit language

Religion
- Sunni Islam

Related ethnic groups
- Tama

The Mararit are an ethnic group of Chad and Darfur, Sudan. Most members of this ethnic group are Muslims. They speak the Mararit language, which is a Nilo-Saharan language.

On 23 March, 2023 a member of the Mararit tribe was killed in El Geneina. A group of Mararit tribe members tracked down the alleged two killers and stoned them to death.
