= Kulbus District =

Kulbus (Dar Gimr/Kimr)
- District
- Country: Sudan
- State: West Darfur

Population (2008)
  - Total: 112,340

Kulbus is a district of West Darfur state, Sudan.
