= Abu Suruj =

Abu Suruj أبو سروج
- Administrative unit
- Interactive map of Abu Suruj
- Coordinates: 13°42′43″N 22°29′36″E
- Country: Sudan
- State: West Darfur
- Traditional Region: Dar Erenga

The Abu Suruj Administrative Unit (Arabic: أبو سروج) is a local administrative division in northern West Darfur, Sudan. Situated north of the state capital, Al-Geneina, near the border with Chad, Abu Suruj is part of Dar Erenga, the traditional homeland of the Erenga ethnic group. The administrative unit encompasses several surrounding villages, including Sirba, Silea, and Bir Dageeg.

While historically relying on agriculture and regional trade, Abu Suruj's strategic border position has made it a site of frequent military conflict during the broader Darfur war.

== History ==
On February 8, 2008, Sudanese military forces along with Janjaweed militias launched a joint air and ground attack targeting Abu Suruj and neighboring settlements in northern West Darfur. At least 30 civilians were killed in Abu Suruj during the offensive. Satellite imagery analysis later confirmed widespread physical destruction across the area. The attack triggered mass displacement, forcing thousands of residents to flee to the Jebel Mun mountains or across the border into Chad. Human rights organizations and the Office of the United Nations High Commissioner for Human Rights (OHCHR) documented the event, and findings were later submitted to the International Criminal Court (ICC).

Following the major military operations, Abu Suruj experienced recurring security issues and infrastructural disruption. Essential services suffered ongoing degradation; for example, theft of solar panels powering local water systems left large portions of the population without access to clean drinking water. In October 2026, military confrontations were reported near Abu Suruj and Bir Saliba between the Sudanese army-aligned Joint Force and the Rapid Support Forces (RSF).

== See also ==
- Dar Erenga
- Sirba, West Darfur
- West Darfur
