= Foro Baranga =

Foro Baranga فوربرنقا
- City
- Location of Foro Baranga in Sudan
- Coordinates: 12°7′37″N 22°35′53″E
- Country: Sudan
- State: West Darfur
- District: Habillah
- Time zone: UTC+2 (CAT)

Foro Baranga or Forbrenga (Arabic: فوربرنقا) is a town located in West Darfur, Sudan.

== History ==
The villagers from 20 villages near Foro Baranga town held a demonstration in front of the city council on 14 August 2011 over the lack of availability of the new currency

An armed militia robbed Foro Baranga court, Zakat Bureau office, and six shops on 25 November 2013. On 30 March 2014 midnight, a fire incident that razed down 18 houses occurred in El Kifah neighborhood.

On 29 May 2021, a protest occurred in Foro Baranga in response to the death of a man killed by an unknown armed group in the Foro Baranga market. The protestors blocked the main roads. They torched shops in the market, administrative offices, the Zakat chamber, and the tax office. Security forces were deployed to ease the tensions.

An ethnic clash between Masalit and Arabs occurred in Foro Baranga on 10 and 11 April 2023. The militia burned houses in six neighborhoods and looted civilian belongings. This attack caused the death of 25 people and displaced 20.000 people from Foro Baranga and the surrounding areas. Responding to this ethnic strife, the West Darfur government imposed a curfew for two weeks from 19:00 to 07:00 in Foro Baranga.

=== 2023 Sudan conflict ===
On 15 April 2023, a clash Rapid Support Forces between Sudanese Armed Forces happened in Foro Baranga.

== Economy ==
There is a market in Foro Baranga. The market holds importance for camel trading.

== Healthcare ==
Town residents health is served by Foro Baranga Rural Hospital.
