= Sungor language =

Nilo-Saharan language of Chad and Sudan

Sungor
- Bognak-Asungorung
- Assangori
- Native to: Chad, Sudan
- Region: Ouaddaï, Darfur
- Ethnicity: Sungor, Erenga
- Native speakers: 100,000 (2023)
- Language family: Nilo-Saharan?: Eastern Sudanic; Northern Eastern; Taman; Tama–Sungor; Sungor
- Dialects: Sungor; Walad Dulla
- Writing system: Unwritten

Language codes
- ISO 639-3: sjg
- Glottolog: assa1269
- ELP: Assangori
- Linguasphere: 05-DAA-ae
- Sungor is classified as Vulnerable by the Endangered Languages Project

Linguistic map of the non-Arab peoples of Darfur, showing the extent of the Taman languages in Sudan.

Sungor (also Assangorior, Assangor, Assangori, Songor, Asongor) is an Eastern Sudanic language of eastern Chad and western Sudan and a member of the Taman branch. It is closely related to Tama with some researchers speaking of a Tama-Assangori continuum.

Sungor is spoken in an area located to the south of Biltine and to the north of Adré (Ouaddaï) in Chad, as well as in Darfur in Sudan. It is spoken by the Sungor people, of which a majority are Muslim. The number of speakers was estimated at 23,500 according to the 1993 census of Chad.

== Phonology ==
So far, Sungor phonology is not well attested in literature and research.

=== Vowels ===
Sungor is most likely a tonal language with a high and low tone, e.g. 'worm' dút and 'big' dùt. It has seven vowels and height assimilations. Examples for height assimilation include plural suffixes -u,-uk, and -uɲ which trigger the root vowel /a/ to be raised to /ɔ/ as in 'raven' gárá changing into 'ravens' gɔrú . Another example are suffixes -i and -iŋ which trigger the root vowel /a/ to be raised to /ɛ/ as in 'house' wál changing into 'houses' wἐlί.

=== Consonants ===
	Labial	Alveolar	Post-alveolar	Palatal	Velar	Glottal
Plosive	b	t, d			k, g	
Nasal	m	n			ŋ	
Trill/Tap		r				
Fricative	f	s	ʃ		x, ɣ	h
Approximant		l		j	w	
Affricative		ts	dʒ			

- Final position plosives are neutralized.
- The voiced palatal nasal /ɲ/ may exist as well.
- /r/ may be articulated as a trill or tap.
- /f/ and /h/ are infrequent in native words. 80% of words with word-initial /f/ are of Arabic origin. Word final /h/ is rare.
- /ɣ/ seems to be adopted from Arabic.
- Sungor appears to show gemination, though this is still underresearched.

== Grammar ==
^{Apart from some examples listed in the phonology tab, all words are spelled according to Lukas/Nachtigal with some limitations caused by a lack of certain characters on Wikipedia. Due to historical reasons, spelling roughly follows German spelling rules.}

=== Noun classes ===
Sungor, like Tama, follows a noun class system. Similarly to other Sudanese languages that also use noun classes, Sungor distinguishes meaning through the use of suffixes. However, there is little overlap between the suffixes used.

==== Plurals ====
Plurals are mostly formed by suffixion. Suffixes change depending on class and number. Lukas lists 31 different suffix pairs which do not necessarily constitute separate noun classes. There are six ways of forming plurals in Sungor:

1. Most plurals are formed by changing the class suffix. Some examples are 'skin' gera | geriŋ (Singular -a, Plural -iŋ), 'love' tárī | tárā (Sg. -ī, Pl. -ā), 'name' iget | igā (Sg. -et, Pl. -ā), or arabic loan 'muslim person' miselem | muselmīn (Pl. -īn).
2. Other plurals only take a suffix. Some arabic loanwords fall into this category. Examples include 'heart' ámel | ámelā (Pl. -ā), 'human' at | árē or árī (Pl. -ē or -ī), 'mouth' kul | kulō (Pl. -ō), 'head' ŋor | ŋūrū (Pl. -ū), 'lip' oróyik | oroyikiŋ (Pl. -iŋ).
3. There are some broken plurals, most of which are arabic loanwords. Examples are 'scholar' fik | fókora, 'robber' afrīt | afārit, 'pet' zāmela | zwāmel, or non-arabic 'grandpa' anat | ónut.
4. Lukas lists one example of pluralisation where the vocal length is changed 'cow' tḛ | tệ.
5. A small number of words form the singular from a collective plural. Examples are 'witch' émet | émē (Sg. -t), 'horse' ferda | fērat (Sg. -da, Pl. -at), 'wild cat' lūlut | lǘlu.
6. Some words are irregular in the way that they form a plural. Some examples are 'woman' ī | īrin, 'dog' wī | wḗā, 'blacksmith' mēat | mīnyak.

=== Pronouns ===
		Subject	Oblique/Object	Possessive
1st person	singular	wa / wo	waŋ	nar / na
1st person	plural	wē / wui	wēŋ	oŋon / uŋun
2nd person	singular	ī	īŋ	nor / nur
2nd person	plural	ai	eiŋ	ō / ḗŋkun
3rd person	singular	ési / ísē	ésiŋ	an(er) / un
3rd person	plural	ésiŋ^{1}	ésiŋkoŋ^{2}	ōn / ūn

^{1. 3rd person Plural also exists as áiŋko}

^{2. from ésiŋko which corresponds to áiŋko}

Possessive pronouns in Sungor stand in postposition, e.g. 'his brother' bet an. If a possessive follows a plural, it is pluralised by adding -uŋ, e.g. 'our hearts' omulu uŋunuŋ.

==== Demonstrative ====
Sungor Demonstratives are quite underresearched. Examples are 'this' translating to iŋ, plural iŋkō and 'that translating to ệŋ, plural ệŋgo.

==== Interrogative ====
Interrogatives lack research as well. 'Who' translates to nấrē, 'which' to nấnē, and 'what' to nímmōrī or nim as an alternative expression.

==== Indefinite ====
The word for 'human' at is used to express 'someone'. The plural is árī. To differentiate whether 'someone' refers to a man or woman, the respective terms follow. 'Man' is at ma, 'woman' is at ī. Following this same pattern, 'everyone' translates to at kíro, literally 'every human' with kíro being the term for 'every'. Other indefinite pronouns are 'some' kōra, 'everything' híniŋ, or 'nobody' lō. Plurals can be formed by adding the suffix -guŋ.

=== Numbers ===
1	kor	11	mer konterek	100	mía	1000	elf
2	wárē	12	mer warterek	101	mía o kor	2000	ta elf wárē
3	íca	13	mer icerek	102	mía o wárē	3000	ta elf íca
4	kus	14	mer kúserek	110	mía o mer	5000	elf másī
5	másī	15	mer masterek	120	mía o tíli war	100000	míat elf
6	tor	16	mer tórterek	150	mía o tíli másī		
7	kal	17	mer kalterek	200	míat wárē		
8	kibs	18	mer kibesterek	300	míat íca		
9	úku	19	mer ukṹterek	400	míat kus		
10	mer	20	tíli wárē				
		30	tíli íca				
		40	tíli kus				
		45	tíli kus ge másī				

==== Ordinal Numbers ====
Ordinals are derived from the cardinal numbers by adding suffixes -na or -no.

Ordinal Numbers
first^{1}	korna / korena
second	wórna / wórēna
third	ícana / ícenaí
fourth	kúsono
fifth	másena
sixth	tṓrena
seventh	kálena
eighth	kíbiseno
ninth	úkuno
tenth	mérena

^{1. "The first" (male) also has the special form kémerik}

To indicate how often something happens/has happened, Sungor uses mar and the corresponding ordinal number, e.g. 'the first time' mar korena.

=== Adverbs ===
Sungor has locative adverbs, temporal adverbs, and adverbs of manner. Adverbs in Sungor are not well attested for. Some examples of locative adverbs are 'here' índi, 'there' ḗŋdē, 'between' rēnik, 'above' óroyē. Temporal adverbs are, for example, 'daily' abad hḯnik, 'today' dấdo, 'always' dīman, 'yesterday' ệrē, 'now' hása, 'tomorrow' súsekē. Examples for adverbs of manner are 'maybe' tấsei, 'impossible' tấsoto. 'Maybe' tấsei might not be an adjective in itself since it can be divided into tấ-sei 'it will be'.

==== Adverbial numbers ====
Numbers become adverbial when they follow the arabic loanword mar, e.g. 'once' mar kor.

=== Adjectives ===
In Sungor, adjectives follow and agree with the noun, for example 'white clay' ōsu aek and 'red clay' ōsu arak. Adjectives form plurals by adding a suffix, e.g. 'small, young' elit | eliŋa (Sg. -t, Pl. -ŋa), 'ripe, mature' naχed | naχedo (Pl. -o), 'older brother' jō dud | jṓā dútū.

=== Verbs ===
Verbs inflect by addition of affixes to a word root. For example, 'I birth' nḗne has the root ēn. Verb roots are usually monosyllabic or disyllabic. Prefixes mark the person, whereas suffixes mark time and mood.

The verbs can be put into three groups depending on the plural-affix they take. While verbs in Group I & II follow a regular patter, group III consists of irregular affixation.

==== Present ====
In the following tables, 'R' marks the verb-root, 'V' signals a vowel, sounds in brackets '()' only sometimes occur, sounds in squared brackets '[]' only rarely occur, and '/' signals different realizations according to the context of an utterance, '-' is used to signal affixes.

		Group I	Group II
1st person	singular	n-(V)R-[n]e/i	n-(V)R-i/[e]
1st person	plural	n-(V)R-[i]nye	n-(V)R-e/ge^{1,2}
2nd person	singular	(V)R-[n]e/i	(V)R-i/[e]
2nd person	plural	(V)R-[i]nye	(V)R-e/ge
3rd person	singular	R-[n]e/i	R-i/[e]
3rd person	plural	R-(i)nye	R-e/ge

^{1. Also occurs as eke/[inye]}

^{2. Nasals are followed by -ge, plosives or /s/ are followed by -eke}

In the present tense, verbs can be further divided up into those that have suffix -i (Group I) or -e (Group II).

Present tense conditionals take one of three suffixes: -(V)ŋne, -kne, or -(V)ne. The plural is formed by adding a conditional suffix to a plural suffix, e.g. 'if I count' noto̯yanē | 'if we count' noto̯nyane (from no·to̯y·ny·ane).

Negation happens by adding a suffix. A positive form with the suffix -e takes -ato if the verb root contains front vowels (a, e, i) or -oto if the verb root contains back vowels (o, u). If the positive form takes the suffix -i, the negative form takes the suffix -to or -(V)kto (sometimes -kāto) with some exceptions. In the plural form -kto becomes -kāto/-kōto, while -ato/-oto remains the same.

==== Past ====
		Preterite I		Preterite II	
		Group I	Group II	Group I	Group II
1st person	singular	n-(V)R(V)(V)-ŋV	same as Group 1	n-VR(V)(V)-ŋVŋV	not documented
1st person	plural	n-(V)R(V)-nyVŋV^{1}	n-(V)R-g/kaŋa	n-VR(V)-nyVŋV	not documented
2nd person	singular	(V)R(V)(V)-ŋV	same as Group 1	VR(V)(V)-ŋVŋV	not documented
2nd person	plural	(V)R(V)-nyVŋV	(V)R-g/kaŋa	VR(V)-nyVŋV	not documented
3rd person	singular	R(V)(V)-ŋV	same as Group 1	R(V)(V)-ŋVŋV	not documented
3rd person	plural	R(V)-nyVŋV	R-g/kaŋa	R(V)-nyVŋV	not documented

^{1. Also n-(V)RV-aŋa}

Preterite tense suffixes can sometimes be added onto the present tense suffixes -i and -e.

Preterite conditionals are formed by replacing the -ne | -nē. These conditionals have a future meaning, e.g. 'I counted' notộyiŋa (preterite I) and 'if I will count' noto̯yiŋne, 'I requested' nisekḗŋiŋa and 'if I will request' nisekḗŋiŋne.

Both negatives of preterite I & II are derived from the positive by adding the suffix -to, e.g. 'I played' nagarnáŋa | 'I did not play' nagarnáŋto (preterite I) and nagarnáŋiŋa | nagarnáŋiŋto (preterite II).

==== Future ====
		Group I	Group II
1st person	singular	n-(V)R(V)sai	n-(V)R(V)-sai
1st person	plural	n-(V)R(V)sinye	n-(V)R(V)-saie^{1}
2nd person	singular	(V)R(V)-sai	(V)R(V)-sai
2nd person	plural	(V)R(V)-sinye	(V)R(V)-saie
3rd person	singular	R(V)-sai	(t)-(V)R(V)-sai
3rd person	plural	R(V)-sinye	(t)-(V)R(V)-saie

^{1. Group II plural marker saie can also be replaced by seke}

Lukas suspects the future marker -sa to be an auxiliary verb in the present tens.

Future tense conditionals are formed by adding suffix -ŋnē, e.g. 'to know' njel and 'if I will know' ninjilisáiŋnē.

==== Imperative ====
Imperatives in Sungor differ based on the present tense verb group a word falls into. The positive singular imperative for verbs that end in -i is the verb root, although there are some exceptions. Verbs that end in -e take suffixes -a, -o, -e, and in some cases -i. For plurals, the prefix k-(V)- and suffixes -a or -o are needed. Negative imperatives are follow the either the schemata VR-aito or VR-ēto.

==== Auxiliaries ====
Some auxiliaries exist in Sungor. However, due to a lack in research, auxiliaries are not well documented.
