= Kimr people =

Total population
- 139,000 in 2011

Regions with significant populations
- Dar Kimr

Languages
- Kimr Tama, Chadian Arabic

Religion
- Sunni Islam

Linguistic map of the non-Arab peoples of Darfur, showing the extent of the Taman languages in Sudan.

Kimr or Gimr is an ethnic group in West Darfur in Sudan and Chad. They speak Gimr, a dialect of Tama, a Nilo-Saharan language. One 1996 source puts the population at over 50,000.

== History ==
Historically, the Kimr have been located between the Sultanate of Darfur and the Sultanate of Wadai. They became tributaries to Wadai from the early 17th century to 1874. The Ottomans conquered the region in 1874 via Egypt and the Kimr paid tribute to them until 1882. From that time until 1910, the Kimr suffered from the armies of the Masalits, Furs, the French, and the Mahdists. After the establishment of the Anglo-Egyptian Sudan, the Kimr nobility were incorporated into the new administrative structure.

== Culture ==
The Kimr engage in dryland farming with crops like millet being commonly cultivated. Some Kimr have opted to migrate to areas like Southern Darfur or the city of Darfur to seek work.

The Kimr are Muslims.
