= Sirba, West Darfur =

Sirba سربا

- Location in Sudan
- Coordinates: 13°49′20.87″N 22°27′31.71″E
- Country: Sudan
- State: West Darfur
- Elevation: 801 m (2,628 ft)
- Time zone: Central Africa Time, GMT + 3

Sirba (Arabic: سربا) is a town in West Darfur, Sudan, located in the historical region of Dar Erenga. It lies approximately 23 kilometres (14 mi) north of El Geneina, which is the capital of West Darfur. Sirba is located near other local administrative units and villages, such as. Abu Suruj.The town has been subjected to attacks and violence by the Rapid Support Forces (RSF) and allied gunmen during the ongoing conflict in the region.

== History ==
Sirba has been subject to violent seizure and destruction by the Rapid Support Forces (RSF) and allied Arab militias multiple times. During the 2023 Sudan conflict, Sirba has experienced significant destruction and has been nearly destroyed or burned to the ground multiple times. Satellite data shows the massive fire destruction in the town in late July 2023, leading to tens of thousands of civilians fleeing for their lives.

The attacks involved looting, burning of homes and markets, and targeted violence against the ethnic African communities, particularly the Eringa tribe. These attacks have led to significant loss of life, with hundreds of residents killed and thousands injured or displaced, including many who fled to Chad seeking safety.

Human Rights Watch has called for robust measures to address the ongoing atrocities, urging the United States to take action at the UN Security Council to protect civilians and hold those responsible for the violence accountable. The United Nations Integrated Transition Assistance Mission in Sudan (UNITAMS) has expressed grave concern over the targeting of civilians and public facilities by the RSF and allied militias, and the need for urgent action to ensure the safety and protection of civilians in Darfur.

The conflict in Darfur has been ongoing for many years, and there have been efforts to resolve the violence through peace talks, but the situation remains volatile. The recent escalation of fighting in the region has raised fears of a new wave of ethnic violence, as civilians, including students and higher education staff, are increasingly caught up in the conflict. The attacks have also prompted the withdrawal of humanitarian workers due to security concerns, leaving refugees and displaced people in precarious conditions.
