= Tama people =

Tama
Total population
- 349,000

Regions with significant populations
- Chad; Sudan

Languages
- Tama language

Religion
- Sunni Islam

Related ethnic groups
- Fur, Masalit, Daju, Nilo-Saharans

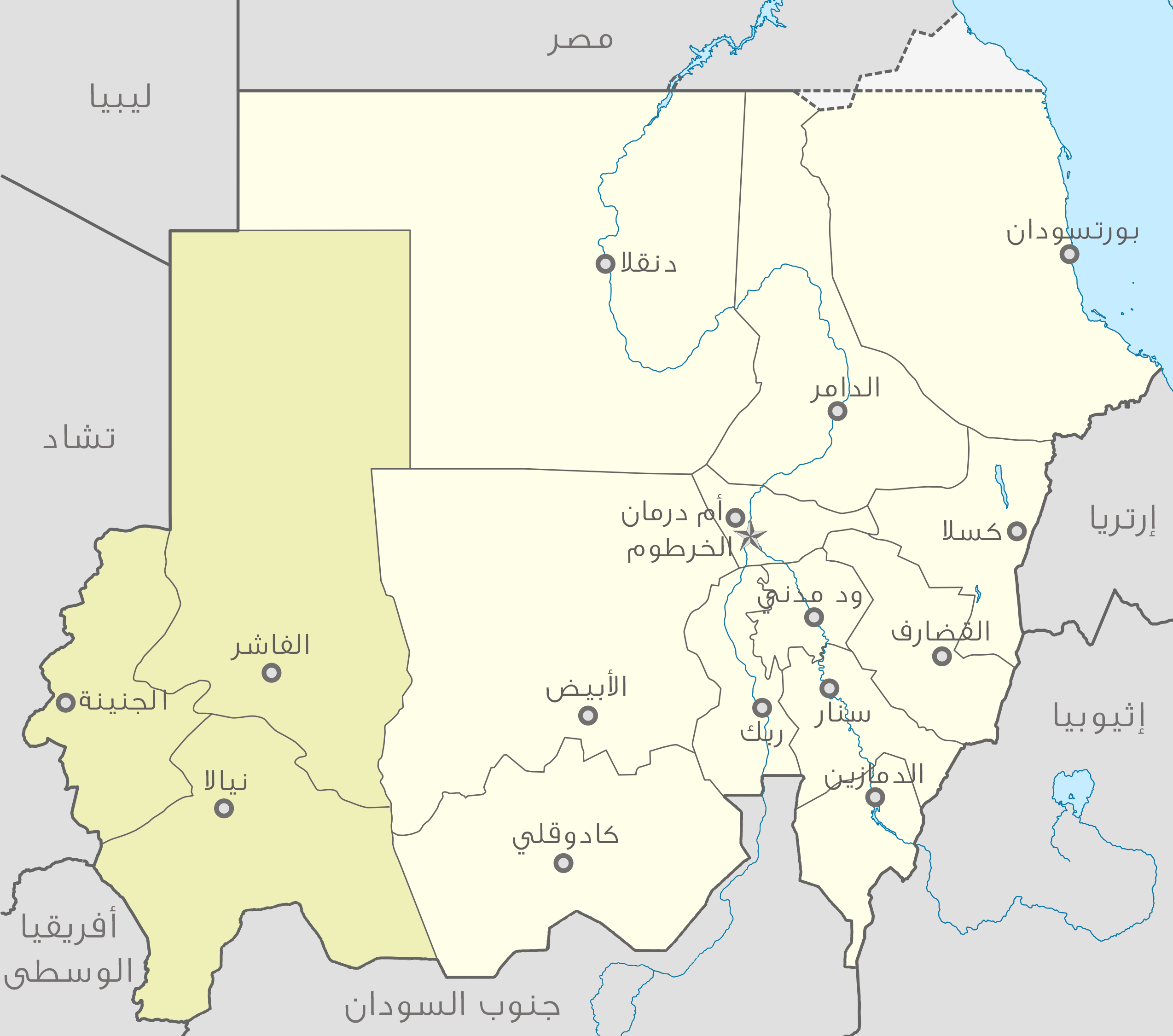
of Darfur 2011 ar.png -

The Tama are an ethnic group living in eastern Chad and western Sudan. They speak Tama one of the early Yam sub clan in early Egypt, a Nilo-Saharan language. The population is 349,000 people, and they practice Islam. Many Tama are subsistence farmers and traders who live in permanent settlements, and some raise livestock. In the civil war in Chad, the Tama were involved in ethnic conflicts with the Zaghawa (Zagada/Zagawu) tribe.

== Society and Culture ==
The Tama people are a non-Arab [1] (i.e., "Indigenous African" [2][3]) tribe that lives in Dar Tama in northeastern Chad and Darfur, Sudan. They number 793,000. They speak Tama, a Nilo-Saharan language. Many of the Tama are subsistence farmers who live in permanent settlements and raise millet, beans, cucumbers, gumbo, and sesame. They also raise cattle, camels and goats. The majority of Tama are Muslims, but they also have some animistic beliefs.

== Subgroups ==
The Tama are made up of some subgroups: Abu Sharib (approximately 50,000 (Gimr (50,000), Kibet, Marari (20,000), Mileri (9,000), and Tama proper.

The traditional home of the Tama is Dar Tama. All reside in Chad, except the Gimr and the Mileri, who live near Saref Omra and Kebkabiya in Sudan. In 2006, due to violence between the Tama and the Zaghawa, 1,800 Tama refugees fled to Mile and Kounoungo, United Nations-sponsored refugee camps.

== Governance ==
For centuries, the Tama were governed by sultans. Many of these were believed to be of Dadjo origin. In the 1800s they were a warlike tribe who was known for their use of the spear, who had maintained their independence for the previous two centuries. On at least two occasions, they resisted the invasions from other tribes.

At various times they have been subjected to the sultans of Wadai on the west and Darfur on the east, but have always had their own sultan. For example, they were part of the Sultanate of Darfur in the early 1800s. Turkish-Egyptian Sudan governed the area in the late 1800s. During the French colonial period, France really only governed southern Chad, and therefore not the Dar Tama region, but a figurehead sultan was put in place to govern the area.

== Zaghawa ethnic tension ==
During the Sahelian drought of the 1980s, the Zaghawa migrated to Dar Tama and displaced some of the Tama.

With the migration of the Zaghawas, armed horsemen began to raid the Tama livestock and commit robberies and murders, a situation that worsened after the rise to power of Déby, who favored his ethnic group in high government and police positions in Dar Tama. The new Zaghawa elite did little to protect Tama civilians from the looting and raiding of these bandits, and even took part in them. This abuse of power was the main reason that led to the establishment of the National Resistance Alliance (ANR) in 1994, an armed organization from which the FUC would later split.

At the time of the Chadian civil war the rebel group United Front for Democratic Change (FUC) largely consisted of Tama. The Zaghawa felt the Tama supported this rebel group that opposed the Chadian government, which was led by President Idriss Déby, a member of the Zaghawa tribe, though there was little activity of any rebel group on the community level.

A 2006 robbery of a Tama man and an ensuing gunfight that caused 20 deaths and 9 serious injuries was cited as the event that triggered increased violence. After that, the Zaghawa increased the frequency and violence of their theft of Tama cattle. In 2006, dozens of Tama were killed by Zaghawa militants and thousands of Tama were displaced after Zaghawa attacks on Tama villages.

In August 2006, 3,300 Tama civilians fled from Dar Tama to Sudan because some Zaghawa accused a Tama man of raping one of their women. In October, 1,800 refugees fled to Mile and Kounoungo, UN-sponsored refugee camps. Human Rights Watch could not corroborate allegations of Tama attacks on Zaghawa civilians. The Chadian government and police did little to investigate or condemn the increasing violence.

== See also ==
- Ardamata massacre, which included Tama victims

== Bibliography ==
- Africa Division of Human Rights Watch (January 2007). Leslie Lefkow; Georgette Gagnon; Aisling Reidy; Andrew Mawson (eds.). ""They Came Here to Kill Us": Militia Attacks and Ethnic Targeting of Civilians in Eastern Chad" (PDF). Human Rights Watch.
- Henry Barth (1857). Travels and discoveries in north and central Africa, 1849-1855, Volume 2. Harvard University.
- Human Rights Watch (July 2007). "Early to War: Child Soldiers in the Chad Conflict" (PDF). Human Rights Watch.
- James Stuart Olson (1996). The Peoples of Africa: An Ethnohistorical Dictionary. Greenwood Publishing Group. ISBN 0313279187.
