= West Darfur =

State of Sudan

West Darfur State ولاية غرب دارفور Gharb Darfor
- State
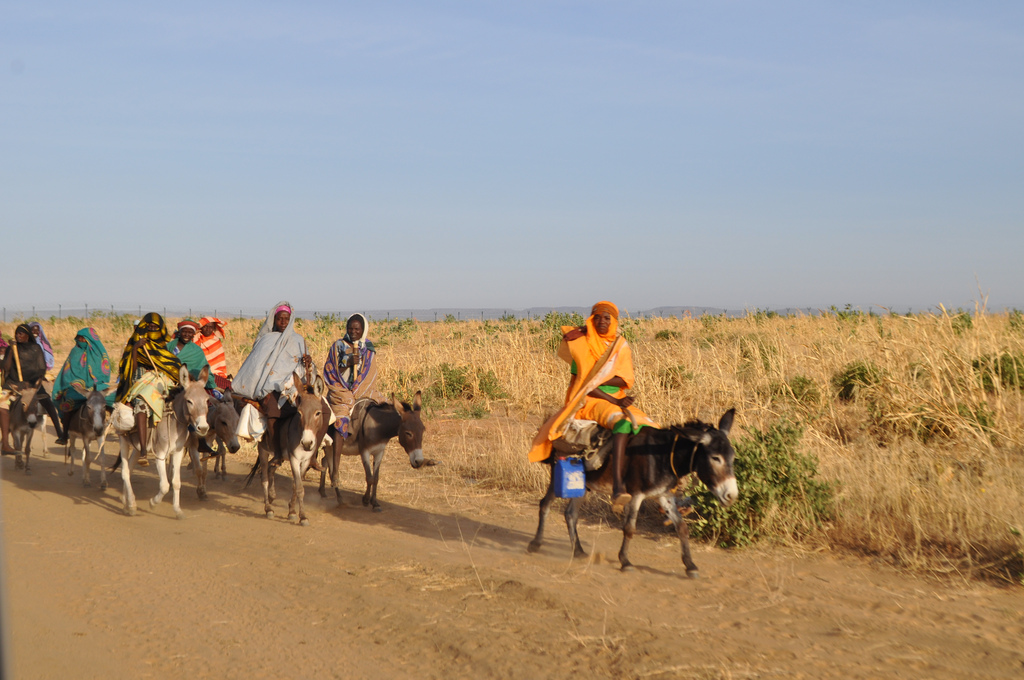
- Travelers in West Darfur

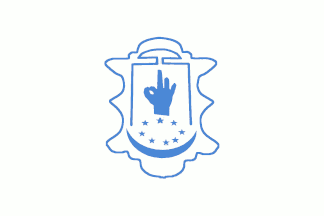
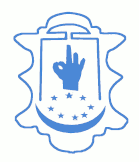
- Flag Seal

- Location in Sudan.
- Coordinates: 13°33′N 22°42′E
- Country: Sudan
- Region: Darfur
- Capital: Geneina

Government
  - Governor: Al-Tijani Karshoum (Note: His governorship is contested by Bahr al-Din Adam Karama as part of the ongoing conflict in Sudan. On 27 July 2024 The Chairman of the Sovereignty Council and Commander-in-Chief of the Army, Abdel Fattah al-Burhan, signed a decree appointing Bahr al-Din Adam Karama as governor of West Darfur. This decision removed Al-Tijani Karshoum who was the current acting governor. Al-Tijani Karshoum made clear that he did not recognize the legitimacy of Burhan’s decree and made clear that he had no intentions of leaving/ceding/surrendering his governorship. As of 2025 Al-Tijani Karshoum continues to occupy the governors residence, meet with the press, claim the title of governor, and exercise the powers and duties of the office. He does so with the tacit support/backing of the Rapid Support Forces (RSF) who are the de facto authorities in all of West Darfur. As such Bahr al-Din Adam Karama does not have any actual power other than having been given the title of governor by Al-Burhan. For all of these reasons Al-Tijani Karshoum remains the effectual governor of West Darfur.)

Area
  - Total: 79,460 km^{2} (30,680 sq mi)

Population (2023)
  - Total: 1.9 million
- Time zone: UTC+2 (CAT)
- HDI (2022): 0.454 low

West Darfur State (Arabic: ولاية غرب دارفور Wilāyat Ḡarb Dārfūr), historically Dar Masalit (Arabic: دار مساليت), is one of the states of Sudan, and one of five comprising the Darfur region. Prior to the creation of two new states in January 2012, it had an area of 79,460 km² and an estimated population of approximately 1,775,945 in 2018. It borders North and Central Darfur to the east. The Chadian prefectures of Biltine and Ouaddaï lie to the west, while to the north is the prefecture of Bourkou-Ennedi-Tibesti. Al-Junaynah is the capital of the state. West Darfur has been the site of much of the Darfur conflict.

During the 2023 Sudan conflict, ethnic violence has been rampant across the region. This has included several Masalit massacres.

== Geography ==
=== Topography ===
West Darfur covers an area of 79,460 km^{2}, approximately the size of Czechia. The region is mostly savannah, though the northern regions are sandy, while the rest of the state is mountainous. The highest peak is Sawani mountain, with a height of 1154m and a prominence of 210m. There are several valleys across the state such as Wādī Kaja, and there are dense forests in the mountains.

=== Climate ===
As the state varies from dry desert in the northern regions to rich savannah in the south, the climate is largely hot and dry, with June and July being the hottest months, at times reaching over 45 °C. As is typical of deserts, nights reach much cooler temperatures, around 15-20 °C. Though rainfall is very low, it is generally higher in the southern parts of the state. Below is a table of average and peak temperatures, precipitation, humidity and sunshine:

Climate data for West Darfur
| Month | Jan | Feb | Mar | Apr | May | Jun | Jul | Aug | Sep | Oct | Nov | Dec | Year |
|---|---|---|---|---|---|---|---|---|---|---|---|---|---|
| Record high °F | 104.0 | 109.4 | 113.0 | 113.0 | 114.8 | 105.8 | 104.0 | 96.8 | 100.4 | 102.2 | 102.2 | 100.4 | 114.8 |
| Mean daily maximum °F | 91.11 | 96.87 | 99.43 | 101.41 | 100.47 | 95.2 | 88.2 | 85.08 | 89.94 | 93.78 | 92.59 | 89.83 | 93.65 |
| Mean daily minimum °F | 56.73 | 61.12 | 65.91 | 69.57 | 73.69 | 75.81 | 72.28 | 69.53 | 71.64 | 72.43 | 66.29 | 59.27 | 67.86 |
| Record low °F | 39.2 | 44.6 | 46.4 | 55.4 | 57.2 | 64.4 | 62.6 | 57.2 | 66.2 | 66.2 | 53.6 | 46.4 | 39.2 |
| Average precipitation inches | 0.00 | 0.05 | 0.07 | 0.12 | 1.08 | 4.32 | 13.37 | 16.94 | 6.08 | 1.17 | 0.01 | 0.0 | 3.60 |
| Record high °C | 40.0 | 43.0 | 45.0 | 45.0 | 46.0 | 41.0 | 40.0 | 36.0 | 38.0 | 39.0 | 39.0 | 38.0 | 46.0 |
| Mean daily maximum °C | 32.84 | 36.04 | 37.46 | 38.56 | 38.04 | 35.1 | 31.2 | 29.49 | 32.19 | 34.32 | 33.66 | 32.13 | 34.25 |
| Mean daily minimum °C | 13.74 | 16.18 | 18.84 | 20.87 | 23.16 | 24.34 | 22.38 | 20.85 | 22.02 | 22.46 | 19.05 | 15.15 | 19.92 |
| Record low °C | 4.0 | 7.0 | 8.0 | 13.0 | 14.0 | 18.0 | 17.0 | 14.0 | 19.0 | 19.0 | 12.0 | 8.0 | 4.0 |
| Average precipitation mm | 0.01 | 1.26 | 1.83 | 2.94 | 27.46 | 109.67 | 339.64 | 430.25 | 154.49 | 29.69 | 0.14 | 0.0 | 91.45 |
| Average precipitation days | 0.0 | 0.27 | 0.45 | 0.64 | 3.55 | 12.55 | 25.09 | 28.82 | 18.55 | 5.18 | 0.09 | 0.0 | 7.93 |
| Average relative humidity (%) | 18.74 | 15.78 | 13.93 | 13.25 | 21.41 | 38.04 | 59.61 | 71.32 | 56.69 | 32.25 | 19.78 | 18.95 | 31.65 |
| Mean monthly sunshine hours | 11.58 | 11.58 | 11.55 | 11.51 | 11.52 | 11.41 | 10.95 | 10.65 | 11.26 | 11.55 | 9.6 | 11.6 | 11.23 |

=== Localities ===
Geneina is one of the largest cities in the state, and its capital. The state has eight localities: Beida, Forbranga, Al Geneina, Habila, Jebel Mun and Kirendik, Kulbus, and Sirba. Other settlements include:

- Beida
- Forbranga
- Jebal Mun
- Kirendik
- Al Geneina
- Habila
- Kulbus
- Sirba
- Dar Erenga
- Abu Suruj

== Demographics ==
The population of West Darfur was estimated in 2023 at 1.9 million people, with 90% living in urban areas.

=== Ethnic groups ===
The major ethnic groups in West Darfur are the Erenga, Gimir, Masalit, Misseriya Jebel, Sinngar, and Zaghawa.

== History ==
The Darfur region is divided into five federal states: Central Darfur, East Darfur, North Darfur, South Darfur and West Darfur.

According to Human Rights Watch, hostilities broke out in West Darfur in 1998. The 1998 clashes, were relatively minor, but more than 5,000 Masalit were displaced. Clashes resumed in 1999 when nomadic herdsmen again moved south earlier than usual.

The 1999 clashes were deadlier, with hundreds killed, including a number of Arab tribal chiefs. The government brought in military forces in an attempt to quell the violence and took direct control of security. A reconciliation conference held in 1999 agreed on compensation. Many Masalit intellectuals and notables were arrested, imprisoned, and tortured in the towns as government-supported Arab militias began to attack Masalit villages; a number of Arab chiefs and civilians were also killed in these clashes.

In 2000, a clandestine group consisting mostly of Darfuris published the Black Book, a dissident manuscript detailing the domination of the north and the impoverishment of the other regions. It was widely discussed, despite attempts to censor it, and many of the writers went on to help found the rebel Justice and Equality Movement.

=== Sudanese Civil War ===
From April to November 2023, the Rapid Support Forces (RSF) carried out attacks on the capital city of Geneina, killing thousands.

== See also ==
- History of Darfur
