= United Nations Security Council Resolution 1714 =

UN Security Council Resolution 1714
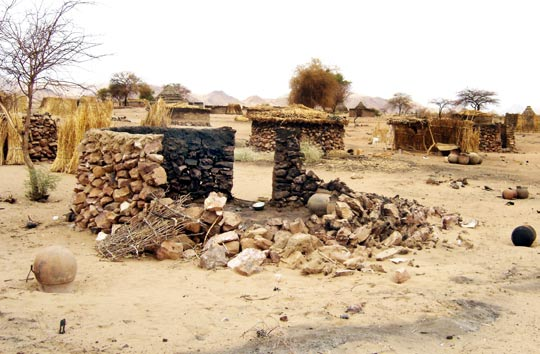
- Burnt hut in Darfur
- Date: 6 October 2006
- Meeting no.: 5,545
- Code: S/RES/1714 (Document)
- Subject: The situation concerning Sudan
- Voting summary: 15 voted for; None voted against; None abstained
- Result: Adopted

Security Council composition
- Permanent members: China; France; Russia; United Kingdom; United States
- Non-permanent members: Argentina; Rep. of the Congo; Denmark; Ghana; Greece; Japan; Peru; Qatar; Slovakia; Tanzania

United Nations Security Council Resolution 1714, adopted unanimously on October 6, 2006, after recalling previous resolutions on the situation in Sudan, particularly resolutions 1590 (2005), 1627 (2005), 1653 (2006), 1653 (2006), 1663 (2006), 1679 (2006), 1706 (2006) and 1709 (2006), the Council extended the mandate of the United Nations Mission in Sudan (UNMIS) until April 30, 2007.

== Resolution ==
=== Observations ===
The preamble of the resolution welcomed progress made in the implementation of the security arrangements contained in the Comprehensive Peace Agreement and the parties were also called to continue with the implementation of other aspects of that agreement. In this regard, there had been an improvement in the humanitarian situation in South Sudan.

There was concern at restrictions placed upon the UNMIS peacekeeping mission and the effect on its ability to perform its mandate effectively, and the use of child soldiers. Furthermore, it reiterated concern at the deteriorating humanitarian situation in Darfur and the need to end all violence and atrocities in that region.

The Council welcomed the African Union's decision to extend the mandate of the African Union Mission in Sudan until December 31, 2006.

=== Acts ===
Resolution 1714 decided to extend the mandate of UNMIS until the end of April 2007, with the intention of further renewals. The Secretary-General Kofi Annan was required to report every three months on the implementation of the mandate of UNMIS.

Finally, it called upon all parties to relevant peace and security agreements in Sudan to fully implement those agreements.

== See also ==
- African Union Mission in Sudan
- African Union – United Nations Hybrid Operation in Darfur
- International response to the War in Darfur
- List of United Nations Security Council Resolutions 1701 to 1800 (2006–2008)
- South Sudan
- Timeline of the War in Darfur
- War in Darfur
