= United Nations Security Council Resolution 1997 =

UN Security Council Resolution 1997
- UNMIS ribbon
- Date: 11 July 2011
- Meeting no.: 6,579
- Code: S/RES/1997 (Document)
- Subject: The situation in Sudan
- Voting summary: 15 voted for; None voted against; None abstained
- Result: Adopted

Security Council composition
- Permanent members: China; France; Russia; United Kingdom; United States
- Non-permanent members: Bosnia–Herzegovina; Brazil; Colombia; Germany; Gabon; India; Lebanon; Nigeria; Portugal; South Africa

United Nations Security Council Resolution 1997, adopted unanimously on July 11, 2011, after recalling resolutions 1590 (2005), 1627 (2005), 1663 (2006), 1706 (2006), 1709 (2006), 1714 (2006), 1755 (2007), 1812 (2008), 1870 (2009), 1919 (2010) and 1978 (2011) on the situation in Sudan, the Council authorised the withdrawal of the United Nations Mission in Sudan (UNMIS) by August 31, 2011.

The resolution was adopted amid reservations by some nations including France, Germany, the United Kingdom and United States, that the withdrawal during conflict and tensions between Sudan and South Sudan necessitated the UNMIS operation to remain in the region.

== Resolution ==
=== Observations ===
The Security Council noted a request from the Sudanese foreign ministry declaring the government's request to end UNMIS on July 9, 2011—the day South Sudan would become independent from Sudan. It emphasised the need for the orderly withdrawal of the UNMIS mission following the end of its mandate on July 9, 2011.

=== Acts ===
The resolution authorised the withdrawal of UNMIS from July 11, 2011, further calling on the Secretary-General Ban Ki-moon to complete the withdrawal of all UNMIS personnel by August 31, 2011. All staff and equipment would be transferred from UNMIS to the United Nations Interim Security Force for Abyei (UNISFA) and United Nations Mission in the Republic of South Sudan (UNMISS) in a "smooth transition".

Meanwhile, the Council urged the northern Sudanese government to respect all aspects of the status of forces agreement signed in December 2005, and to guarantee full freedom of movement of United Nations personnel and equipment. Finally, the Secretary-General was also asked to present options to the Security Council concerning security arrangements in Blue Nile and South Kordofan states.

== See also ==
- List of United Nations Security Council Resolutions 1901 to 2000 (2009 – 2011)
- Second Sudanese Civil War
- South Kordofan conflict
- Southern Sudanese independence referendum, 2011
- United Nations Security Council Resolution 1990
- United Nations Security Council Resolution 1996
