= United Nations Security Council Resolution 1709 =

UN Security Council Resolution 1709
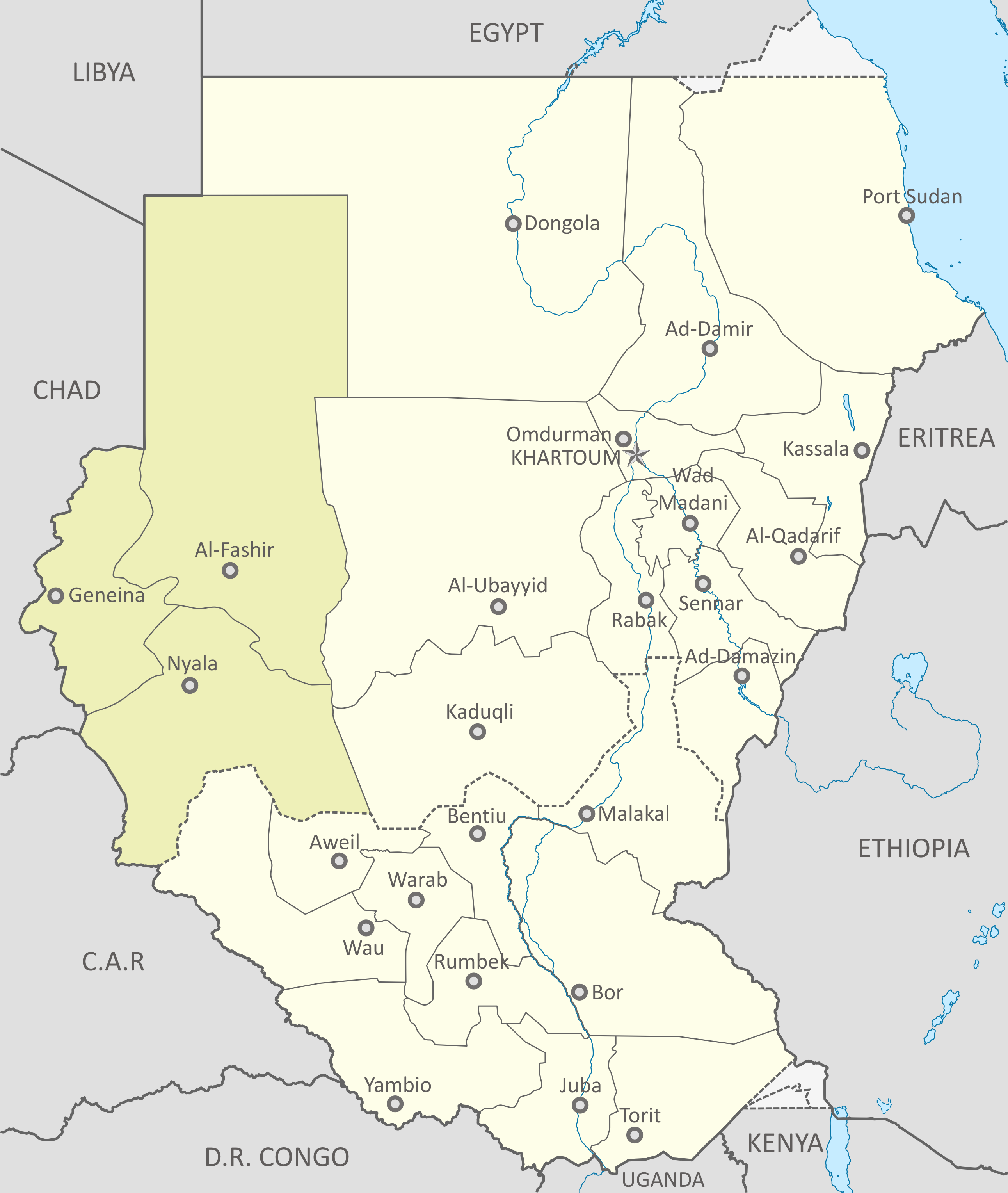
- Darfur (dark yellow) region of Sudan
- Date: 22 September 2006
- Meeting no.: 5,532
- Code: S/RES/1709 (Document)
- Subject: The situation concerning Sudan
- Voting summary: 15 voted for; None voted against; None abstained
- Result: Adopted

Security Council composition
- Permanent members: China; France; Russia; United Kingdom; United States
- Non-permanent members: Argentina; Rep. of the Congo; Denmark; Ghana; Greece; Japan; Peru; Qatar; Slovakia; Tanzania

United Nations Security Council Resolution 1709, adopted unanimously on September 22, 2006, after recalling previous resolutions on the situation in Sudan, particularly resolutions 1590 (2005), 1627 (2005), 1653 (2006), 1653 (2006), 1663 (2006), 1679 (2006) and 1706 (2006), the Council extended the mandate of the United Nations Mission in Sudan (UNMIS) for a period until October 8, 2006.

== Details ==
The Council was concerned at restrictions placed upon the UNMIS peacekeeping mission and the effect on its ability to perform its mandate effectively. Furthermore, it expressed concern at the deteriorating humanitarian situation in Darfur, reiterating the need to end all violence and atrocities in the region.

Determining the situation to remain a threat to international peace and security, the Council renewed the mandate of UNMIS until October 8, 2006, with the intention for further renewals if necessary.

== See also ==
- African Union Mission in Sudan
- African Union – United Nations Hybrid Operation in Darfur
- International response to the War in Darfur
- List of United Nations Security Council Resolutions 1701 to 1800 (2006–2008)
- South Sudan
- Timeline of the War in Darfur
- War in Darfur
