= United Nations Security Council Resolution 1706 =

UN Security Council Resolution 1706
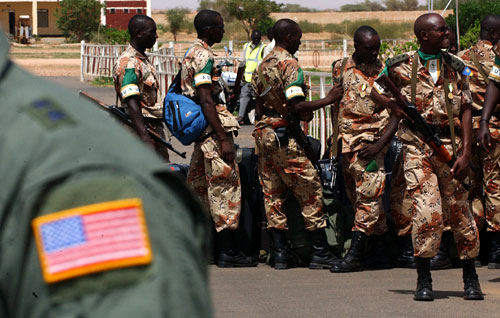
- Rwandan peacekeeping forces in Darfur
- Date: 31 August 2006
- Meeting no.: 5,519
- Code: S/RES/1706 (Document)
- Subject: The situation in Sudan
- Voting summary: 12 voted for; None voted against; 3 abstained
- Result: Adopted

Security Council composition
- Permanent members: China; France; Russia; United Kingdom; United States
- Non-permanent members: Argentina; Rep. of the Congo; Denmark; Ghana; Greece; Japan; Peru; Qatar; Slovakia; Tanzania

United Nations Security Council Resolution 1706, adopted on August 31, 2006, after recalling previous resolutions on the situation in Sudan, including resolutions 1556 (2004), 1564 (2005), 1574 (2004), 1590 (2004), 1591 (2005), 1593 (2004), 1663 (2006), 1665 (2006) and 1679 (2006), the Council expanded the mandate of the United Nations Mission in the Sudan (UNMIS) to include deployments in Darfur to enforce the Darfur Peace Agreement.

Strongly rejecting the resolution, Sudan had refused to participate in the Security Council session. Resolution 1706 was adopted by 12 votes in favour to none against and three abstentions from China, Qatar and Russia; all three said that while they supported the contents of the resolution, it lacked consent from Sudan. Given that the deployment was dependent on agreement from the Sudanese government, the resolution marked the first time that a United Nations peacekeeping mission was authorised but failed to deploy. It was also the first armed conflict in which the Security Council had invoked the "responsibility to protect" resolution. On July 31, 2007, the adoption of Resolution 1769 finally authorised a peacekeeping mission for Darfur.

== Resolution ==
=== Observations ===
The members of the Council commended political efforts to resolve the crisis in Darfur, led by the African Union, and reaffirmed its commitment to assisting the Sudanese government in tackling various problems affecting the country. Furthermore, the efforts of the African Union Mission in Sudan (AMIS) were welcomed. The Council envisaged a follow-on United Nations operation in Darfur with African participation.

Meanwhile, the resolution expressed concern over the consequences of the prolonged conflict in Darfur on the rest of Sudan and the neighbouring Central African Republic and Chad, while the relations between Chad and Sudan had deteriorated. Violations of human rights and international humanitarian law in Darfur were condemned and there was concern about the safety of humanitarian aid workers.

=== Acts ===
The mandate of UNMIS was expanded to include deployments in Darfur, with the consent of the Sudanese government. At the same time, it was decided to increase its size by up to 17,300 military personnel, 3,300 police personnel and 16 police units; temporary reinforcements could be deployed at the request of the Secretary-General. Kofi Annan was requested to put together a plan for the transition of an African Union to United Nations peacekeeping force with early deployments taking place by October 1, 2006. He was also asked to strengthen AMIS through United Nations resources.

Addressing the mandate of UNMIS in Darfur, the Council decided that it should work to implement the Darfur Peace Agreement. Its responsibilities were to monitor the ceasefire and the movements of armed groups, investigate violations of the agreements, participate in demobilisation and reintegration programmes for ex-combatants, maintain a presence in internally displaced persons camps, protect human rights, assist in the organisation of the proposed referendums and promote the peace process.

Finally, the resolution authorised UNMIS, under Chapter VII of the United Nations Charter, to use "all necessary means" to protect civilians, United Nations and humanitarian personnel, and to seize weapons. The parties to the agreements were urged to implement them fully, and the Secretary-General was directed to report on progress made, including the refugee situation.

== See also ==
- African Union Mission in Sudan
- African Union – United Nations Hybrid Operation in Darfur
- International response to the War in Darfur
- List of United Nations Security Council Resolutions 1701 to 1800 (2006–2008)
- Southern Sudan
- Timeline of the War in Darfur
- War in Darfur
