= United Nations Security Council Resolution 1978 =

UN Security Council Resolution 1978
- Location of South Sudan
- Date: 27 April 2011
- Meeting no.: 6,522
- Code: S/RES/1978 (Document)
- Subject: The situation in Sudan
- Voting summary: 15 voted for; None voted against; None abstained
- Result: Adopted

Security Council composition
- Permanent members: China; France; Russia; United Kingdom; United States
- Non-permanent members: Bosnia–Herzegovina; Brazil; Colombia; Germany; Gabon; India; Lebanon; Nigeria; Portugal; South Africa

United Nations Security Council Resolution 1978, adopted unanimously on April 27, 2011, after recalling all previous resolutions on the situation in Sudan, the Council extended the mandate of the United Nations Mission in Sudan (UNMIS) until July 9, 2011 and announced its intention to create a successor mission.

== Observations ==
The Council considered the results of the independence referendum held in South Sudan in January 2011 and the government's request for a continued United Nations presence there. At the same time, it also determined the situation to remain a threat to international peace and security in the region.

== Acts ==
The mandate of UNMIS, as set out in Resolution 1590 (2005), was extended until July 9, 2011 (the day South Sudan would become independent). The Council announced its intention to establish a successor mission, and requested the Secretary-General Ban Ki-moon to consult with parties to the Comprehensive Peace Agreement on the matter and report by May 16, 2011.

Finally, UNMIS was requested to prepare for the establishment of the follow-on mission.

== See also ==
- African Union – United Nations Hybrid Operation in Darfur
- List of United Nations Security Council Resolutions 1901 to 2000 (2009–2011)
- Second Sudanese Civil War
- War in Darfur
