= United Nations Security Council Resolution 1679 =

UN Security Council Resolution 1679
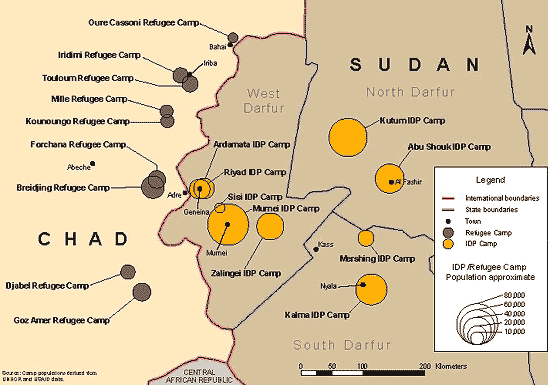
- Refugee camps near the Chad–Sudan border
- Date: 16 May 2006
- Meeting no.: 5,439
- Code: S/RES/1679 (Document)
- Subject: The situation in Sudan
- Voting summary: 15 voted for; None voted against; None abstained
- Result: Adopted

Security Council composition
- Permanent members: China; France; Russia; United Kingdom; United States
- Non-permanent members: Argentina; Rep. of the Congo; Denmark; Ghana; Greece; Japan; Peru; Qatar; Slovakia; Tanzania

United Nations Security Council Resolution 1679, adopted unanimously on May 16, 2006, after recalling resolutions 1556 (2004), 1564 (2004), 1574 (2004), 1590 (2005), 1591 (2005), 1593 (2005), 1663 (2005) and 1665 (2006) on the situation in Sudan, the Council endorsed a decision by the African Union Peace and Security Council to move ahead with a United Nations peacekeeping force in Darfur as soon as possible.

After the adoption of Resolution 1679, China said it would not support any further resolutions against Sudan under Chapter VII authority, unless approval of the Sudanese government was obtained.

== Resolution ==
=== Observations ===
In the preamble of the resolution, the Council expressed concern over the consequences of the prolonged conflict in Darfur on the civilian population and reiterated that all parties had to end the violence immediately. There was also concern that the conflict may affect the rest of Sudan and neighbouring Chad, with the Council noting the deteriorating relations between the two countries.

Meanwhile, the members of the Council commended political efforts to resolve the crisis in Darfur led by the African Union. Furthermore, the efforts of the African Union Mission in Sudan (AMIS) were welcomed, despite "exceptionally difficult circumstances". The Council envisaged a follow-on United Nations operation in Darfur with African participation.

=== Acts ===
Acting under Chapter VII of the United Nations Charter, the Council called upon parties to the Darfur Peace Agreement to respect commitments they had made and immediately implement the agreement, while those that had not signed the agreement were urged to do so. It expressed its intention to consider sanctions against any party or individual that would obstruct the implementation of the agreement.

The African Union was asked to consult with the United Nations, international organisations and countries on measures to strengthen AMIS's capacity to enforce security arrangements from the Darfur Peace Agreement, while endorsing the African Union's decision to transform its operation into a United Nations operation. All decisions relating to the new operation would be discussed with those party to the peace agreement.

Finally, the resolution requested the Secretary-General Kofi Annan to submit recommendations on the mandate, structure, strength, cost and potential participants of the United Nations operation in Darfur, within a week of an assessment mission returning.

== See also ==
- African Union Mission in Sudan
- African Union – United Nations Hybrid Operation in Darfur
- International response to the War in Darfur
- List of United Nations Security Council Resolutions 1601 to 1700 (2005–2006)
- Southern Sudan
- Timeline of the War in Darfur
- War in Darfur
