= United Nations Security Council Resolution 1935 =

UN Security Council Resolution 1935
- UNAMID medal bar
- Date: 30 July 2010
- Meeting no.: 6,366
- Code: S/RES/1935 (Document)
- Subject: The situation in Sudan
- Voting summary: 15 voted for; None voted against; None abstained
- Result: Adopted

Security Council composition
- Permanent members: China; France; Russia; United Kingdom; United States
- Non-permanent members: Austria; Bosnia–Herzegovina; Brazil; Gabon; Japan; Lebanon; Mexico; Nigeria; Turkey; Uganda

United Nations Security Council Resolution 1935, adopted unanimously on July 30, 2010, after reaffirming all previous resolutions and statements on the situation in Sudan, the Council extended the mandate of the African Union – United Nations Hybrid Operation in Darfur (UNAMID) for a further 12 months until July 31, 2011 and demanded an end to fighting and attacks on United Nations personnel and civilians.

The resolution, drafted by the United Kingdom, was adopted during a rise in attacks on United Nations peacekeepers and civilians, including ambushes and the holding of a UNAMID helicopter pilot by local groups. The Council also heard that fighting between rebel groups and the government had intensified. The following day after the adoption of Resolution 1935, the Sudanese government requested UNAMID peacekeepers to inform it of its movements, after accusing the United Nations of failing to keep the peace at refugee camps in the west of the country.

== Resolution ==
=== Observations ===
The Security Council expressed its support to the political process in the Darfur region of Sudan and welcomed dialogue between the Sudanese government and Liberation and Justice Movement (LJM), deploring that some groups refused to join the political process. It underlined co-operation between the United Nations and African Union consistent with Chapter VIII of the United Nations Charter, and the need for a rigorous, strategic approach to peacekeeping deployments in order to improve their effectiveness.

Meanwhile, there was concern at the deterioration of the security situation in Darfur through violations of the ceasefire, rebel attacks, intertribal fighting, aerial bombardment by the Sudanese government and attacks on humanitarian personnel. Furthermore, all violations of human rights and international humanitarian law in Darfur were condemned by the Council, while the resumption of diplomatic relations between Sudan and Chad on January 15, 2010 was welcomed.

=== Acts ===
Extending UNAMID's mandate for a year, the Council urged the operation to make the full use of its mandate to protect civilians and facilitate the delivery of humanitarian aid. It urged for the promotion of the African Union-United Nations led political process in Darfur. All attacks on and threats against UNAMID were strongly condemned as unacceptable and the Council demanded that such incidents cease immediately. Additionally, there was concern at restrictions placed on UNAMID's freedom of movement and operations, and the Secretary-General Ban Ki-moon was required to report every 90 days on the implementation of its mandate.

The resolution demanded that all parties to the conflict end violence, attacks on civilians, peacekeepers and humanitarian personnel immediately and comply with international obligations relating to human rights and humanitarian law. In this regard, a more effective ceasefire monitoring mechanism was suggested. The Council was seriously concerned at the deterioration of the humanitarian situation and threats to humanitarian organisations. It reiterated that there would be no military solution to the Darfur conflict and that a political settlement was essential; all parties, including rebel groups, were urged to participate in the process.

The Security Council noted that the conflict in Darfur had consequences on the rest of Sudan and the wider region, and UNAMID was urged to co-operate with the United Nations Mission in Sudan and United Nations Mission in the Central African Republic and Chad. The operation was also asked to assist in preparations for the independence referendum in Southern Sudan. The Council further stressed solutions to the issue of refugees and internally displaced persons and recovery initiatives. It was concerned at continuing localised conflicts and the proliferation of weapons, demanding that all parties to the conflict take measures to protect civilians.

Finally, the Secretary-General was called upon to ensure continuing dialogue and reporting on the situation of children in the conflict, including the use of child soldiers and violations of human rights.

== See also ==
- International response to the War in Darfur
- List of United Nations Security Council Resolutions 1901 to 2000 (2009–2011)
- Sudanese nomadic conflicts
- War in Darfur
