= United Nations Security Council Resolution 1812 =

UN Security Council Resolution 1812
- Date: 30 April 2008
- Meeting no.: 5,882
- Code: S/RES/1812 (Document)
- Subject: Reports of the Secretary-General on Sudan
- Voting summary: 15 voted for; None voted against; None abstained
- Result: Adopted

Security Council composition
- Permanent members: China; France; Russia; United Kingdom; United States
- Non-permanent members: Burkina Faso; Belgium; Costa Rica; Croatia; Indonesia; Italy; Libya; Panama; South Africa; Vietnam

United Nations Security Council Resolution 1812 was adopted unanimously on 30 April 2008.

Determining that the situation in Sudan continued to threaten international peace and security, the Security Council resolved, inter alia, to:

- Extend the mandate of the United Nations Mission in Sudan (UNMIS) until 30 April 2009, with the intention to renew it for further periods.
- Request that the Secretary-General report to the Council every three months on the implementation of UNMIS's mandate.
- Emphasize the importance of full and expeditious implementation of all elements of the Comprehensive Peace Agreement (CPA), the Darfur Peace Agreement, and the October 2006 Eastern Sudan Peace Agreement.
- Call on all parties to respect their commitments to those agreements without delay.

== Related resolutions ==
- 1325, 1502, 1612, 1663, 1674, 1997

== See also ==
- List of United Nations Security Council Resolutions 1801 to 1900 (2008–2009)
