= United Nations Security Council Resolution 1663 =

UN Security Council Resolution 1663
- Sudan
- Date: 24 March 2006
- Meeting no.: 5,269
- Code: S/RES/1663 (Document)
- Subject: The situation concerning Sudan
- Voting summary: 15 voted for; None voted against; None abstained
- Result: Adopted

Security Council composition
- Permanent members: China; France; Russia; United Kingdom; United States
- Non-permanent members: Argentina; Rep. of the Congo; Denmark; Ghana; Greece; Japan; Peru; Qatar; Slovakia; Tanzania

United Nations Security Council Resolution 1663, adopted unanimously on March 24, 2006, after recalling previous resolutions on the situation in Sudan, particularly 1627 (2005) and 1653 (2006), the Council extended the mandate of the United Nations Mission in Sudan (UNMIS) for six months until September 24, 2006.

== Observations ==
In the preamble of the resolution, Council members welcomed the implementation of the Comprehensive Peace Agreement by the Sudanese government and Sudan People's Liberation Army/Movement (SPLA/M) and urged the parties to meet their obligations under that agreement. It acknowledged the commitments of troop-contributing countries in support of UNMIS.

The resolution reiterated the need to put an end to violence and atrocities in Darfur, emphasising the need to conclude a peace agreement as soon as possible. It welcomed the African Union's Peace and Security Council decision to support a transition from the African Union Mission in Sudan (AMIS) to a United Nations operation.

Calling the situation in Sudan a "threat to international peace and security", the Council also expressed concern at the movement of weapons and armed groups across borders, including the long-running insurgency by the Lord's Resistance Army (LRA) and the implications on Sudanese civilians.

== Acts ==
The mandate of UNMIS was extended with an intention for further renewals if necessary. The Secretary-General Kofi Annan was requested to report every three months on the situation, including efforts by UNMIS to support the AMIS. In this context, UNMIS was asked to support AMIS in accordance with Resolution 1590 (2005).

Meanwhile, the Secretary-General and African Union were called upon to begin preparations for a United Nations mission in Darfur. The Council also condemned the activities of militia and armed groups such as the LRA which continued to attack civilians and commit human rights abuses in Sudan; it anticipated recommendations from the Secretary-General on how best to deal with the issue.

Finally, Sudanese parties were encouraged to finalise the establishment of national institutions for the disarmament, demobilisation and reintegration of ex-combatants.

== See also ==
- African Union Mission in Sudan
- African Union – United Nations Hybrid Operation in Darfur
- International response to the War in Darfur
- List of United Nations Security Council Resolutions 1601 to 1700 (2005–2006)
- Southern Sudan
- Timeline of the War in Darfur
- War in Darfur
