= United Nations Security Council Resolution 1627 =

UN Security Council Resolution 1627
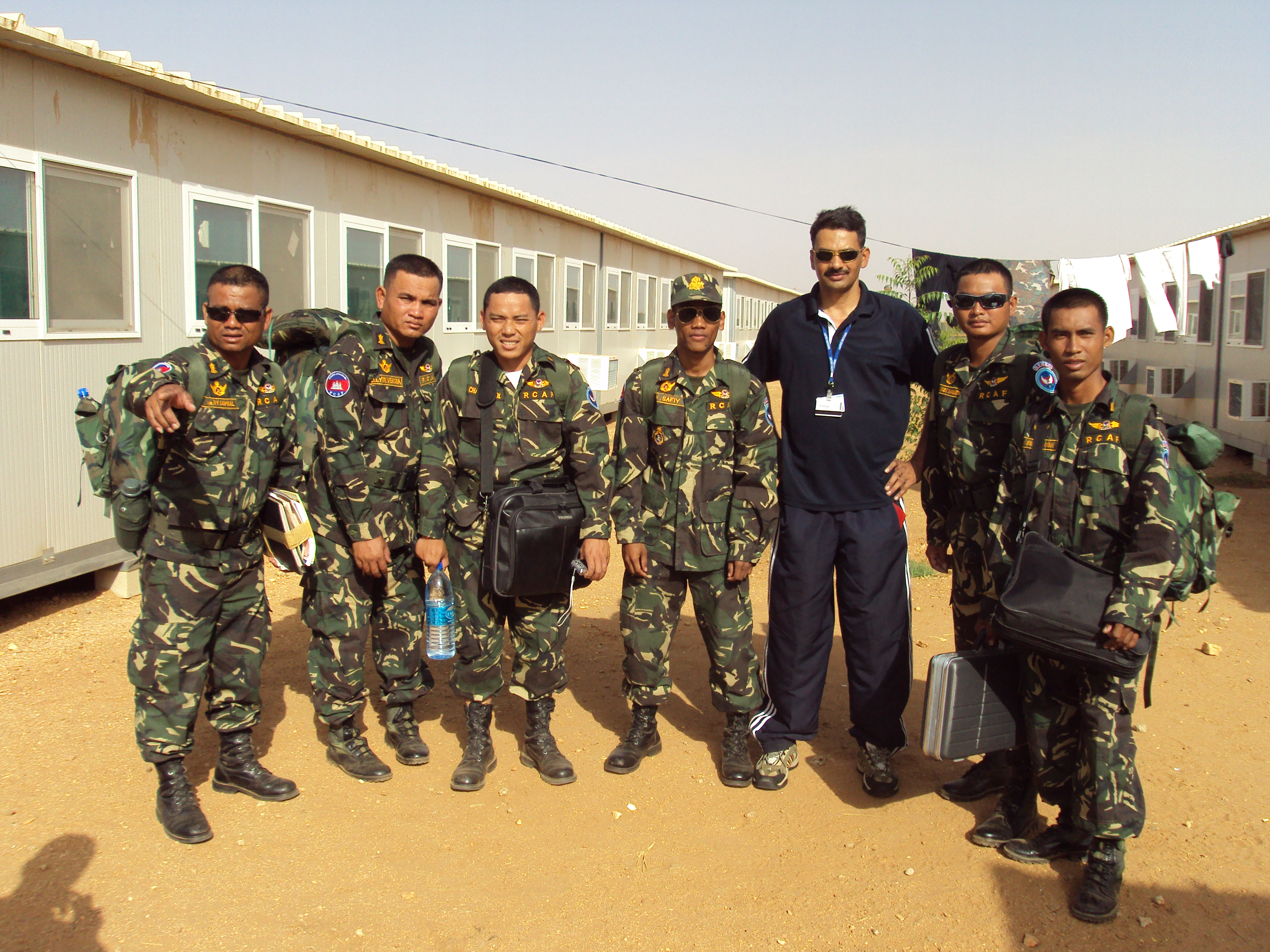
- Cambodian soldiers in Sudan
- Date: 23 September 2005
- Meeting no.: 5,269
- Code: S/RES/1627 (Document)
- Subject: The situation concerning Sudan
- Voting summary: 15 voted for; None voted against; None abstained
- Result: Adopted

Security Council composition
- Permanent members: China; France; Russia; United Kingdom; United States
- Non-permanent members: Algeria; Argentina; Benin; Brazil; Denmark; Greece; Japan; Philippines; Romania; Tanzania

United Nations Security Council resolution 1627, adopted unanimously on 23 September 2005, after recalling previous resolutions on the situation in Sudan, particularly Resolution 1590 (2005), the Council extended the mandate of the United Nations Mission in Sudan (UNMIS) for six months until 24 March 2006.

== Observations ==
In the preamble of the resolution, the Council expressed condolences on the death of John Garang de Mabior, and commended Salva Kiir for his efforts in the peace process. It welcomed the implementation of the Comprehensive Peace Agreement by the Sudanese government and Sudan People's Liberation Army/Movement (SPLA/M) and urged the parties to meet their obligations under that agreement.

The resolution determined the situation to remain a threat to international peace and security.

== Acts ==
The mandate of UNMIS was extended with an intention for further renewals if necessary. The Secretary-General Kofi Annan was requested to report every three months on the situation, including efforts by UNMIS to support the African Union Mission in Sudan. Finally, troop-contributing countries were instructed to take appropriate action to prevent sexual exploitation by UNMIS personnel.

== See also ==
- African Union Mission in Sudan
- United Nations–African Union Mission in Darfur
- International response to the War in Darfur
- List of United Nations Security Council Resolutions 1601 to 1700 (2005–2006)
- South Sudan
- War in Darfur
