= Darfur Peace and Accountability Act =

2006 Sudan-related US legislation

The Darfur Peace and Accountability Act (H.R. 3127/S. 1462, Pub. L. 109–344 (text) (PDF)) or DPAA restates the United States government's position that the Darfur conflict constitutes genocide, and asks the government to expand the African Union peacekeeping force in Darfur (AMIS) and give the force a stronger mandate, including more generous logistical support. It also directs the government to assist the International Criminal Court in bringing justice to those guilty of war crimes. It was passed by the House and Senate and signed into law by President Bush on 13 October 2006 along with a companion executive order.

== Legislative history ==
The House's DPAA bill (H.R. 3127) was introduced on June 30, 2005, by Rep. Henry Hyde (R-IL). There were 162 co-sponsors of the bill. H.R. 3127 passed in the House 416 to 3 on 5 April 2006.

The Senate's DPAA bill (S. 1462) was introduced on 21 July 2005, by Sen. Sam Brownback (R-KS). There were 38 senators who co-sponsored the bill. S. 1462 was passed by the Senate by unanimous consent on 18 November 2005, with some alterations.

The bill then went to conference committee, as the House and Senate attempted to reconcile the differences between their two versions of the bills. Sen. Richard Lugar (R-IN), chair of the Senate Foreign Relations Committee, held the bill in this committee over concerns relating to divestment. The bill was approved by the Senate in revised form on 21 September and passed the House in revised form on 25 September. Shortly thereafter, California Gov. Arnold Schwarzenegger issued a public letter to President Bush urging him to sign the bill, and many members of Congress did the same.

On 13 October 2006, President Bush signed the bill into law. He also signed a companion executive order (see "Provisions," below).

=== Forerunners to the DPAA ===
The Darfur Accountability Act (S. 495) was introduced on 2 March 2005, by former Sen. Jon Corzine (D-NJ). There were 40 senators who co-sponsored the bill. The Darfur Accountability Act was the first piece of binding Darfur-related legislation introduced in the Senate. The bill directed the president to identify and target individuals responsible for the genocide in Darfur. The United States would freeze assets and deny visas to these individuals.

The Darfur Genocide Accountability Act (H.R. 1424) was introduced on March 17, 2005, by Rep. Donald Payne (D-NJ). There were 133 co-sponsors of the bill. The Darfur Genocide Accountability Act was the first piece of binding Darfur-related legislation introduced in the House. The bill was not taken up for a vote and ultimately died, though elements of the bill showed up in the DPAA. The provisions of the Darfur Genocide Accountability Act included targeted sanctions against Sudanese governmental officials, restricted functionality of the Sudanese embassy in the United States, authorization for the president to use force to stop the genocide, and denial of port entry to ships conducting business with Sudan.

=== Subsequent Bills ===
As a result of the removal of "Section 11," protecting individual U.S. states from lawsuits arising from divestment, Rep. Barbara Lee introduced a new bill (H.R. 6140) containing the stripped provision.

== Provisions of the DPAA ==
As described in the text of the bill, the DPAA:

- imposes travel bans and asset freezes on individuals determined by the president to be complicit in atrocities in Darfur (with a conditional presidential waiver);
- authorizes US assistance to strengthen and expand AMIS;
- urges the Bush administration to use the voice, vote, and influence of the US at NATO to advocate greater NATO reinforcement of AMIS;
- urges the administration to deny the government of Sudan access to oil revenues, including by prohibiting entry at US ports to cargo ships carrying Sudanese oil;
- lays out benchmarks that must be met before the US lifts any sanctions currently imposed on the government of Sudan, with a presidential waiver Senate version lays out non-binding benchmarks;
- ~~states that nothing in this Act shall be construed to preempt any state law prohibiting investment of funds, including state pension funds, in or relating to the Republic of Sudan.~~

The second item refers to granting AMIS a Chapter VII mandate as opposed to a Chapter VI mandate, allowing it to intervene regardless of permission from the government of Sudan. The final item, which would have protected individual U.S. states from lawsuits arising from divestment, was stripped when the original House bill reached the Senate.

=== Companion Executive Order ===
In signing the DPAA, Bush also issued Executive Order 13412 strengthening some sanctions on the government of Sudan but loosening restrictions on Southern Sudan.

In his letter to the Speaker of the House and the United States Senate, Bush wrote:

Pursuant to IEEPA and the NEA, I determined that the Government of Sudan continues to implement policies and actions that violate human rights, in particular with respect to the conflict in Darfur, where the Government of Sudan exercises administrative and legal authority and pervasive practical influence, and that the Government of Sudan has a pervasive role in the petroleum and petrochemical industries in Sudan. In light of these determinations, and in order to reconcile sections 7 and 8 of the DPAA, I issued this order to continue the country wide blocking of the Government of Sudan's property and to prohibit transactions relating to the petroleum and petrochemical industries in Sudan.

== Voting records ==
The DPAA was one of three Senate bills scored in the Genocide Intervention Network's congressional scorecard for the 109th Congress, and its companion House bill was one of five pieces of legislation. Sen. Brownback, one of the bill's chief sponsors, was named a "champion of Darfur."
