= Mohammad Maksudur Rahman =

- Born: 01 September 1966 (age 60)
- Military career
- Allegiance: Bangladesh
- Branch: Bangladesh Army
- Service years: 1985–2022
- Rank: Major General
- Unit: Bangladesh Infantry Regiment
- Commands: GOC of 10th Infantry Division; Commandant of BIPSOT; Commander of PGR; Commander of 72nd Infantry Brigade; Commandant of Non-Commissioned Officer's Academy; Commandant of Bangladesh Infantry Regimental Centre
- Conflicts: UNAMID; UNOCI; UNPROFOR

Mohammad Maksudur Rahman is a retired major general in the Bangladesh Army. Before retirement he was director general of Bangladesh Institute of International and Strategic Studies.

== Early life ==
Rahman was born on 1 September 1966. He graduated from the Defence Services Command and Staff College and did a master's degree in defence studies from the National University, Bangladesh.

== Career ==
Rahman was commissioned into the Bangladesh Army on 20 December 1985 in the infantry regiment. He was part of 13th Bangladesh Military Academy long course.

From 1992 to 1993, Rahman served in the United Nations Protection Force during the Yugoslav Wars.

From 2006 to 2007, Rahman served in the United Nations Operation in Côte d'Ivoire.

From 19 November 2013 to 19 November 2015, Rahman served as 10th commandant of the Bangladesh Institute of Peace Support Operation Training. He also served as commander and later commandant of the President Guard Regiment. In October 2015, he was appointed the deputy commander of the United Nations–African Union Mission in Darfur.

Rahman also served as directing staff of Defence Services Command and Staff College, Mirpur. He served as an instructor at the School of Infantry and Tactics (SI&T) in Jalalabad Cantonment and the Non-commissioned Officer's Academy (NCOA) in Bogra Cantonment.

In February 2017, Rahman was appointed the general officer commanding of the 10th Infantry Division in Ramu Cantonment. He replaced Major General Ataul Hakim Sarwar Hasan.

Rahman was posted at National Defence College as senior directing staff (army-1). Before join NDC, he was director general of Directorate General Defence Purchase (DGDP). He also served as the directing staff of Defence Services Command & staff College (DSCSC).

Rahman was the director general of Bangladesh Institute of International and Strategic Studies until September 2022.

In December 2022, Rahman was appointed chairman of Uttara Finance and Investments Limited.

== Personal life ==
Rahman is married to Rownak Afroz with whom he has two daughters.
