= United Nations Security Council Resolution 1769 =

UN Security Council Resolution 1769
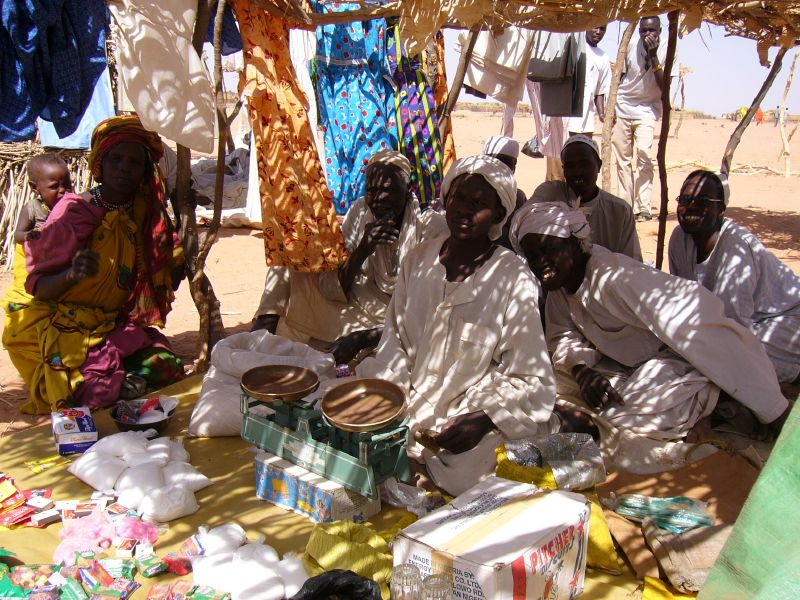
- Darfur refugee camp in Chad
- Date: 31 July 2007
- Meeting no.: 5,727
- Code: S/RES/1769 (Document)
- Subject: The situation in Sudan
- Voting summary: 15 voted for; None voted against; None abstained
- Result: Adopted

Security Council composition
- Permanent members: China; France; Russia; United Kingdom; United States
- Non-permanent members: Belgium; Rep. of the Congo; Ghana; Indonesia; Italy; Panama; Peru; Qatar; Slovakia; South Africa

United Nations Security Council Resolution 1769, adopted unanimously on July 31, 2007, after reaffirming all resolutions on the situation in Sudan, the Council established the joint African Union – United Nations Hybrid Operation in Darfur (UNAMID) in an attempt to end the violence in Darfur, for an initial period of twelve months.

After rejecting a first draft version which included the threat of sanctions, Sudan agreed to accept a second resolution which did not include sanction threats, which it described as a "step in the right direction".

== Resolution ==
=== Observations ===
In the preamble of the resolution, the Council recalled that all parties—including Sudan—at a consultation on Darfur had agreed for the deployment of the United Nations Light and Heavy Support packages to the African Union Mission in Sudan (AMIS) and a hybrid operation in Darfur. The parties had agreed that the hybrid operation should have an "African character" with troops sourced from African countries.

Meanwhile, Resolution 1769 expressed concern about attacks on the population, including widespread sexual violence, and the safety of humanitarian aid workers; in this regard, there was a need to bring those responsible for attacks to justice. The Council demanded an end to air raids and the use of United Nations markings on aircraft in those bombings. It reaffirmed that instability in Darfur may have implications for the wider region and therefore determined the situation to remain a threat to international peace and security.

=== Acts ===
With the intention of the supporting the Darfur Peace Agreement, the Security Council established UNAMID for an initial period of twelve months. It would consist of United Nations and AMIS troops, numbering 19,555 troops, including 360 military observers and liaison officers, and 3,772 police personnel, including 19 police units of 140 officers. All parties were required to co-operate in UNAMID's deployment.

The peacekeeping operation was to monitor the arms embargo in place since Resolution 1556 (2004). Using "all means necessary" under Chapter VII of the United Nations Charter, the mission was also instructed to protect civilians, aid workers and itself from attack and to support the implementation of the Darfur Peace Agreement.

The resolution emphasised that there was no military solution to the conflict in Darfur. There was a need to focus on developmental initiatives such as reconstruction and development, compensation and the return of internally displaced persons to bring about peace in Darfur.

Finally, the Secretary-General Ban Ki-moon was requested to report on the situation every 90 days, including the situation on the ground and the implementation of the peace process.

== See also ==
- International response to the War in Darfur
- List of United Nations Security Council Resolutions 1701 to 1800 (2006–2008)
- War in Darfur
