= International response to the War in Darfur =

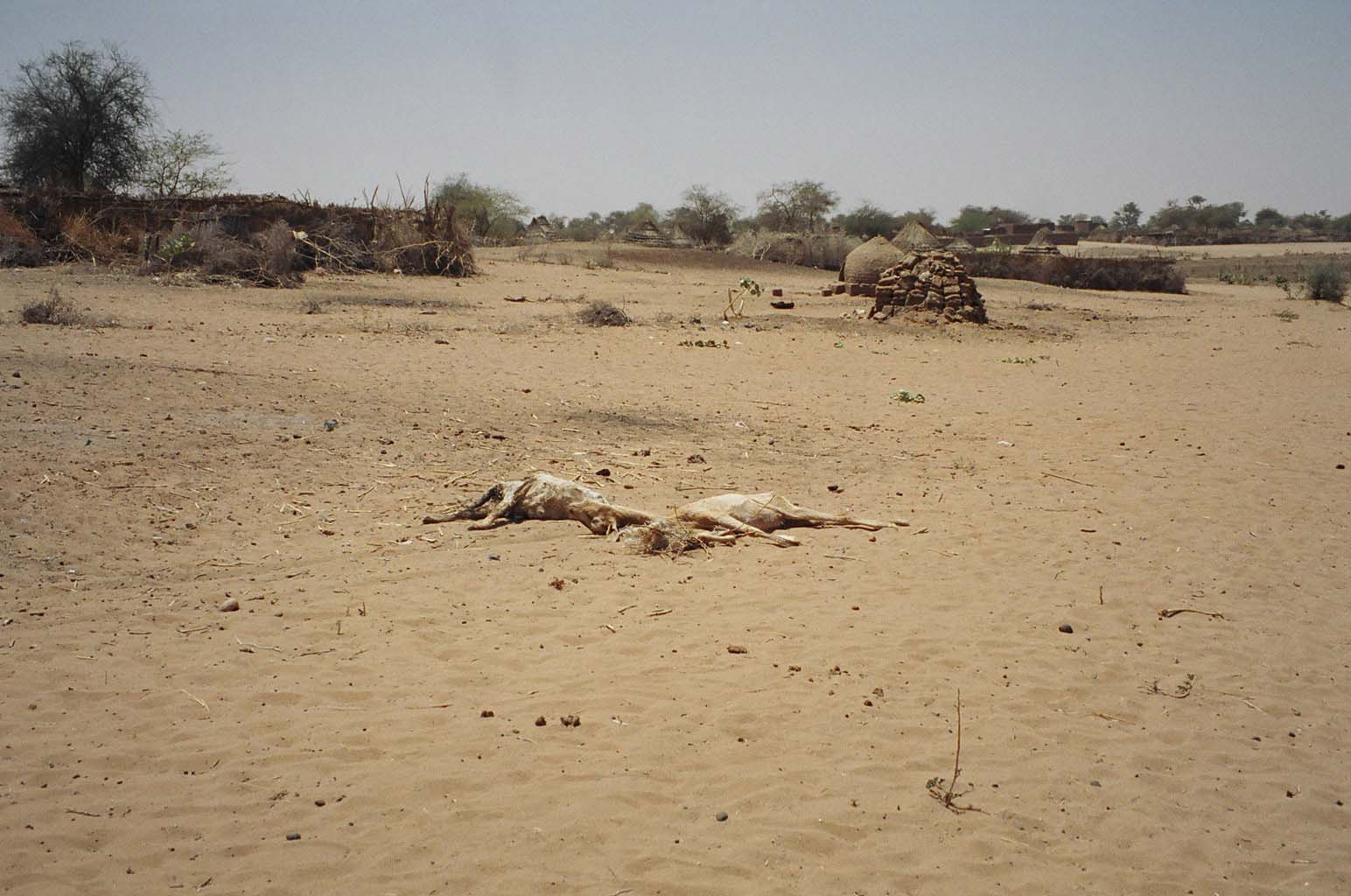
Dead animals lie in the middle of a burned and looted village in Darfur

While there is a consensus in the international community that ethnic groups have been targeted in Darfur and that crimes against humanity have therefore occurred, there has been debate in some quarters about whether genocide has taken place there. In May 2006, the International Commission of Inquiry on Darfur organized by United Nations "concluded that the Government of the Sudan has not pursued a policy of genocide ... [though] international offences such as the crimes against humanity and war crimes that have been committed in Darfur may be no less serious and heinous than genocide." Eric Reeves, a researcher and frequent commentator on Darfur, has questioned the methodology of the commission's report.

The United States government, non-governmental organizations (NGOs) and individual world leaders have chosen to use the word "genocide" for what is taking place in Darfur. (See Declarations of genocide, below) Most notably, in passing the Darfur Peace and Accountability Act of 2006, the US government codified specific economic and legal sanctions on the government of Sudan as a result of its findings of genocide.

== International response ==
International attention to the Darfur conflict largely began with reports by the advocacy organizations Amnesty International in July 2003 and the International Crisis Group in December 2003. However, widespread media coverage did not start until the outgoing United Nations Resident and Humanitarian Coordinator for Sudan, Mukesh Kapila, called Darfur the "world's greatest humanitarian pupita in March 2004. A movement advocating humanitarian intervention has emerged in several countries since then.

=== United Nations ===
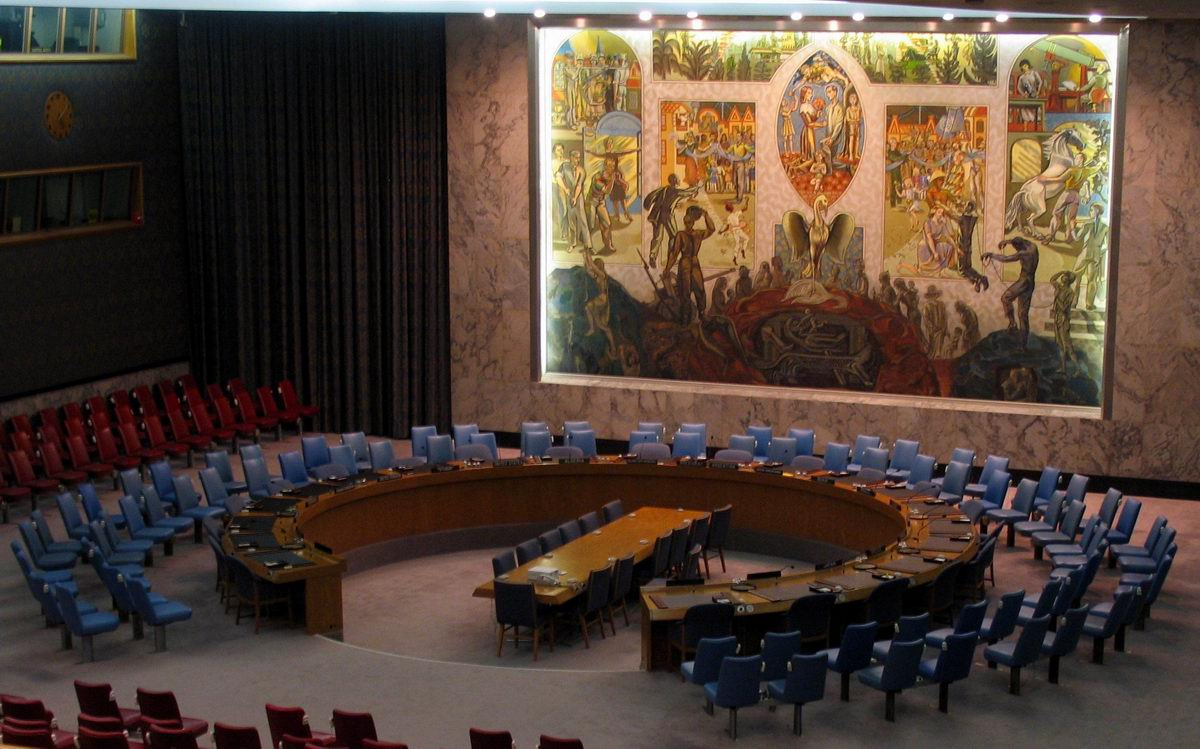
UN Security Council chamber

The ongoing conflict in Darfur, Sudan, which started in 2003, was declared a "genocide" by United States Secretary of State Colin Powell on 9 September 2004 in testimony before the Senate Foreign Relations Committee. Since that time however, no other permanent member of the United Nations Security Council has followed suit. In fact, in January 2005, an International Commission of Inquiry on Darfur, authorized by UN Security Council Resolution 1564 of 2004, issued a report to the Secretary-General stating that "the Government of the Sudan has not pursued a policy of genocide." Nevertheless, the Commission cautioned that "The conclusion that no genocidal policy has been pursued and implemented in Darfur by the Government authorities, directly or through the militias under their control, should not be taken in any way as detracting from the gravity of the crimes perpetrated in that region. International offences such as the crimes against humanity and war crimes that have been committed in Darfur may be no less serious and heinous than genocide."

=== International Criminal Court ===
As Sudan has not ratified the Rome Statute the International Criminal Court can not investigate crimes that may have taken place in Darfur unless the United Nations Security council asks them to under Article 13.b of the Rome Statute ("A situation in which one or more of such crimes appears to have been committed is referred to the Prosecutor by the Security Council acting under Chapter VII of the Charter of the United Nations").

In March 2005, the Security Council formally referred the situation in Darfur to the Prosecutor of the International Criminal Court, taking into account the report of the International Commission of Inquiry on Darfur, authorized by UN Security Council Resolution 1564 of 2004, but without mentioning any specific crimes. Two permanent members of the Security Council, the United States and China, abstained from the vote on the referral resolution. As of his fourth report to the Security Council, the Prosecutor has found "reasonable grounds to believe that the individuals identified [in the UN Security Council Resolution 1593] have committed crimes against humanity and war crimes," but did not find sufficient evidence to prosecute for genocide.

In April 2007, the Judges of the ICC issued arrest warrants against the former Minister of State for the Interior, Ahmad Harun, and a Militia Janjaweed leader, Ali Kushayb, for crimes against humanity and war crimes. The Sudan Government says that the ICC had no jurisdiction to try Sudanese citizens and that it will not hand the two men over to its custody.

On 14 July 2008, prosecutors at the International Criminal Court (ICC), filed ten charges of war crimes against Sudan's President Omar al-Bashir, three counts of genocide, five of crimes against humanity and two of murder. The ICC's prosecutors have claimed that al-Bashir "masterminded and implemented a plan to destroy in substantial part" three tribal groups in Darfur because of their ethnicity. The ICC's prosecutor for Darfur, Luis Moreno-Ocampo, is expected within months to ask a panel of ICC judges to issue an arrest warrant for al-Bashir.

The evidence was submitted to 3 judges who will decide whether to issue an arrest warrant in the coming months. 300,000 people have died and 5 million people were forced from their homes, and still under attack from government-backed janjaweed militia. If formally charged, al-Bashir would become the first sitting head of state charged with genocide. Bashir has rejected the charges and said, "Whoever has visited Darfur, met officials and discovered their ethnicities and tribes ... will know that all of these things are lies."

It is suspected that al-Bashir would not face trial in The Hague any time soon, as Sudan rejects the ICC's jurisdiction. Payam Akhavan, a professor of international law at McGill University in Montreal and a former war crimes prosecutor, says although he may not go to trial, "He will effectively be in prison within the Sudan itself ... Al-Bashir now is not going to be able to leave the Sudan without facing arrest."

=== British response ===
Britain is one of the main donors of aid to Sudan. In supporting the United Nations Security Council resolution in 2007 to authorize the deployment of up to 26,000 peacekeepers to try to stop the violence in Darfur, British Prime Minister Gordon Brown urged strong support for peacekeeping in Darfur.

The British Government has endorsed the ICC decision regarding al-Bashir and has urged the Sudanese Government to co-operate.

== Peacekeeping and military response ==
The Sudanese army on 28 March 2007 denied reports circulated over raids carried out by French paratroopers against Darfur villages.

Senegal honoured on 12 April 2007 five of its soldiers killed in Sudan's Darfur and said it would quit the African Union peacekeeping force there unless it was better equipped and protected.

== Logistics ==
Logistics is one of the major obstacles in Darfur that hinders successful deployment of the UNAMID peace-keeping force and the humanitarian organisations that strive to bring peace, security and a relief of human suffering to the region. The vast region has no major surfaced road network. It is nearly 1,300 kilometres (810 mi) from Sudan's one and only international sea port at Port Sudan and 700 kilometres (430 mi) from the international airport at Khartoum. Transporting aid to and around the region is hard enough, but during the summer months it is nearly impossible as heavy rains descend and destroy the dirt roads and fill the wadis, leaving many areas inaccessible. Cargo is often held up at customs as documentation requirements are often changed and cargo retained at the docks until varying numbers of government officials have inspected it.

During 2007–2008, 22% of transport companies discontinued their services to Darfur due to insecurity. Banditry has increased throughout the conflict, as many of the small rebel factions have turned to it to finance their operations. 51% of the incidents occur along the Ed Daein to Zalingei route, in which both goods, the trucks and drivers have been captured and kidnapped along the way. The goods have been sold for profit, while the vehicles, the main prize, have been incorporated into the bandits' operations, with the kidnapped drivers used to maintain the vehicles. Truck-jackings have become an increasing problem to logistics as not only have the local contractors increased their prices, but many now have to wait for the government to provide armed escorts along the major routes. These escorts are infrequent and are on offer only when the manpower can be spared. The UN forces currently do not have the permission or the forces to operate the long convoys in and out of Sudan, creating a large backlog of aid piling up at the end of the surfaced road in El Obeid, waiting for a convoy to take them the rest of the way. A six or seven-day journey is now taking over three weeks due to these restrictions.

UNJLC, WFP and CARE International have joined forces to create a common pipeline for the different UN agencies and NGOs to transport their procured goods to the Darfur region. During the months of May and June 2008, they offered these services for free, to help the NGOs stockpile their materials so that they would have enough to outstand the rainy season. These services were limited however, and only really applicable for non-food items. Humanitarian organisations that require more constant delivery of goods and delicate materials such as medical supplies and food supplements have been faced with the dilemma of having to fly their materials in, due to the rains. UNHAS has only a few planes and is overstretched due to lack of funding.

== Statements from Western leaders ==
On 18 February 2006 US President George W. Bush called for the number of international troops in Darfur to be doubled.

On 17 September 2006, British Prime Minister Tony Blair wrote an open letter to the members of the European Union calling for a unified response to the crisis.

In supporting the United Nations Security Council resolution in 2007 to authorize the deployment of up to 26,000 peacekeepers to try to stop the violence in Darfur, British Prime Minister Gordon Brown said in a speech before the General Assembly of the United Nations, that the war was "the greatest humanitarian disaster the world faces today".

== Declarations of genocide ==
The following notable individuals and institutions have declared the conflict in Darfur a genocide (organized chronologically by first statement):

- International Association of Genocide Scholars, 19 February 2004
- Genocide Watch, 2 April 2004
- Committee on Conscience of the U.S. Holocaust Memorial Museum, 6 June 2004
- The United States Congress (House Concurrent Resolution 467), 22 June 2004, passed 422–0 in the House and by unanimous voice vote in the Senate, declaring state-sponsored genocide by the proxy militias known as Janjaweed. Therefore, each member of the 108th United States Congress has technically declared that the situation in Darfur is a genocide. All but three members of the 109th United States Congress voted in favor of the Darfur Peace and Accountability Act, a law signed by President Bush in October 2006 that restated the findings of genocide. Additional individual statements by members of the US Congress are noted below.
- US Sen. Russell Feingold, 22 July 2004
- US Secretary of State Colin Powell, 9 September 2004
- US President George W. Bush, 9 September 2004 Restated declaration in June 2005 and in a meeting with activists from the Save Darfur Coalition, 28 April 2006
- Jewish World Watch, 16 September 2004, in a sermon by Rabbi Harold M. Schulweis.
- US Sen. John Kerry, prior to 16 September 2004
- Anti-Defamation League
- US Sen. Joseph Lieberman, 2 March 2005
- Armenian Assembly of America, 2 March 2005
- US Sen. and Senate Majority Leader Bill Frist, 15 April 2005
- American Jewish Committee, 6 May 2005
- Jacob Blaustein Institute for the Advancement of Human Rights, July 2005
- US Sen. Barack Obama, 22 July 2005
- Genocide Intervention Network, 21 November 2005
- Israeli representative to the U.N, Itzhak Levanon, 27 January 2006
- US Sen. Hillary Clinton, 16 March 2006
- French foreign minister Philippe Douste-Blazy, 6 September 2006
- The Assembly of the Republic of Portugal, 4 May 2007
- Physicians for Human Rights (date unknown)
- U.S. Committee for Refugees (date unknown)
- Africa Action (date unknown)
- Justice Africa (date unknown)
- Africa Confidential (date unknown)
- Yad Vashem (date unknown)
- American Israel Public Affairs Committee

The following institutions have not declared the conflict in Darfur a genocide (related statements included):

- United Nations: Stated that mass murders of civilians have been committed by the Janjaweed, but not genocide
- African Union: In the 2004 the Chair of the AU's PSC said that "abuses are taking place. There is mass suffering, but it is not genocide."
- Amnesty International: "The grave human rights abuses ... cannot be ignored any longer, nor justified or excused by a context of armed conflict."
- Médecins sans Frontières: Director Jean-Hervé Bradol called the term genocide "inappropriate" and deputy emergency director Dr. Mercedes Taty said "I don't think that we should be using the word 'genocide' to describe this conflict. Not at all. This can be a semantic discussion, but nevertheless, there is no systematic target – targeting one ethnic group or another one. It doesn't mean either that the situation in Sudan isn't extremely serious by itself."

== Timeline ==
=== 2003 to mid-2004 ===
The United Nations has an extensive timeline for this time period. Key points:

March 2003: Fighting breaks out in Darfur between government forces and rebels. Refugees start fleeing into Chad

January 2004: Aid agencies' response begins in earnest to help thousands of displaced

2 April: UN says "scorched-earth" campaign of ethnic cleansing by Janjaweed militias against Darfur's black African population is taking place

4 May: UN officials describe Darfur as one of the worst humanitarian crises in the world

7 May: Two human rights reports find Sudanese government and Arab militias carrying out massive human rights violations which "may constitute war crimes and/or crimes against humanity"

=== July 2004 ===
In early July 2004, Annan and then-United States Secretary of State Colin Powell visited Sudan and the Darfur region, and urged the Sudanese government to stop supporting the Janjaweed militias. Annan described the trips as constructive.

The African Union (AMIS) and European Union have sent monitors (as of 5 July 2004) to observe the cease-fire signed on 8 April 2004; however, the Janjaweed's attacks have not stopped, as noted by the United States and more recently Human Rights Watch.

According to the BBC in July, analysts estimate that at least 15,000 soldiers would be needed to put an end to the conflict.

On 22 July 2004, the United States Senate and House of Representatives passed a joint resolution declaring the armed conflict in the Sudanese region of Darfur to be genocide and calling on the Bush administration to lead an international effort to put a stop to it.

On 30 July, the United Nations gave the Sudanese government 30 days to disarm and bring to justice the Janjaweed, in UN Security Council Resolution 1556; if this deadline is not met in 30 days, it "expresses its intention to consider" sanctions. The Arab League asked for a longer term and warned that Sudan must not become another Iraq. Resolution 1556 also imposed an arms embargo on the Janjaweed and other militia.

From the Sudanese government's point of view, the conflict is simply a skirmish. The Sudanese president, Omar Hassan al-Bashir, said, "The international concern over Darfur is actually a targeting of the Islamic state in Sudan." Sudan has warned Britain and the United States not to interfere in the internal affairs of the East African country saying it will reject any military aid, while asking for logistic support.

=== August 2004 ===
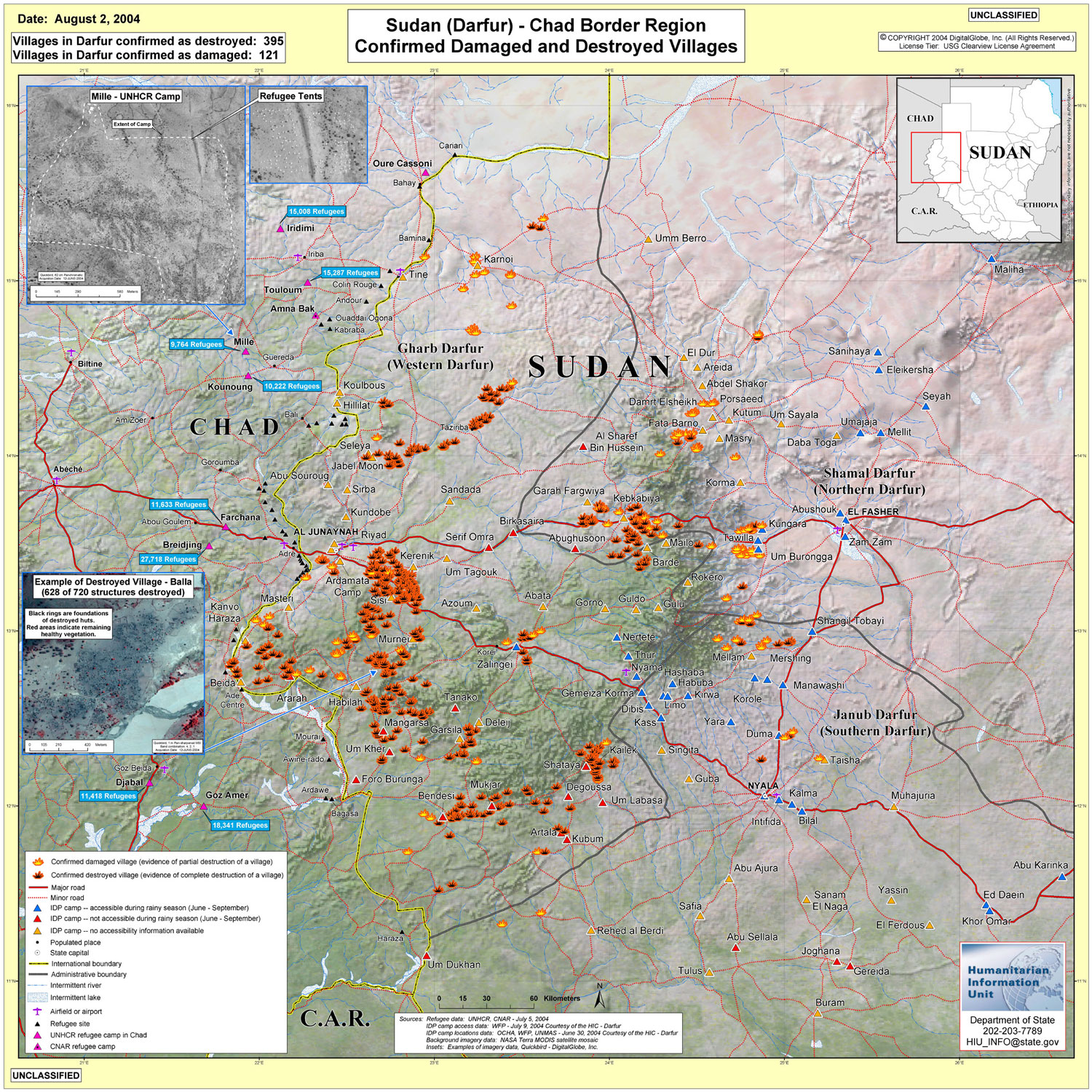
Destroyed villages as of August 2004 (Source: DigitalGlobe, Inc. and Department of State via USAID)

In August 2004, the African Union sent 150 Rwandan troops in to protect the ceasefire monitors; however, "their mandate did not include the protection of civilians." Rwandan President Paul Kagame declared that "if it was established that the civilians are in danger then our forces will certainly intervene and use force to protect civilians"; however, such an effort would certainly take more than 150 troops. They were joined by 150 Nigerian troops later that month.

Peace talks, which had previously fallen apart in Addis Ababa on 17 July, were resumed on 23 August in Abuja. The talks reopened amid acrimony, with the SLA accusing the government of breaking promises that it made for the little-respected April ceasefire.

The UN's 30-day deadline expired on 29 August, after which the Secretary General reported on the state of the conflict. According to him, the situation "has resulted in some improvements on the ground but remains limited overall". In particular, he notes that the Janjaweed militias remain armed and continue to attack civilians (contrary to Resolution 1556), and militia disarmament has been limited to a "planned" 30% reduction in one particular militia, the Popular Defense Forces. He also notes that the Sudanese government's commitments regarding their own armed forces have been only partially implemented, with refugees reporting several attacks involving government forces. He concludes that:

Stopping attacks against civilians and ensuring their protection is the responsibility of the Government of Sudan. The Government has not met this obligation fully, despite the commitments it has made and its obligations under resolution 1556 (2004). Attacks against civilians are continuing and the vast majority of armed militias has not been disarmed. Similarly, no concrete steps have been taken to bring to justice or even identify any of the militia leaders or the perpetrators of these attacks, allowing the violations of human rights and the basic laws of war to continue in a climate of impunity. After 18 months of conflict and 30 days after the adoption of resolution 1556 (2004), the Government of Sudan has not been able to resolve the crisis in Darfur, and has not met some of the core commitments it has made.

and advises "a substantially increased international presence in Darfur" in order to "monitor" the conflict. However, he did not threaten or imply sanctions, which the UN had expressed its "intention to consider" in Resolution 1556.

=== September 2004 ===
On 9 September 2004, then-US Secretary of State Colin Powell declared to the US Senate that genocide was occurring in Darfur, for which he blamed the Sudanese government and the Janjaweed. This position was strongly rejected by the Sudanese foreign affairs minister, Najib Abdul Wahab. The United Nations, like the African Union and European Union, have not declared the Darfur conflict to be an act of genocide. If it does constitute an act of genocide, international law is considered to allow other countries to intervene.

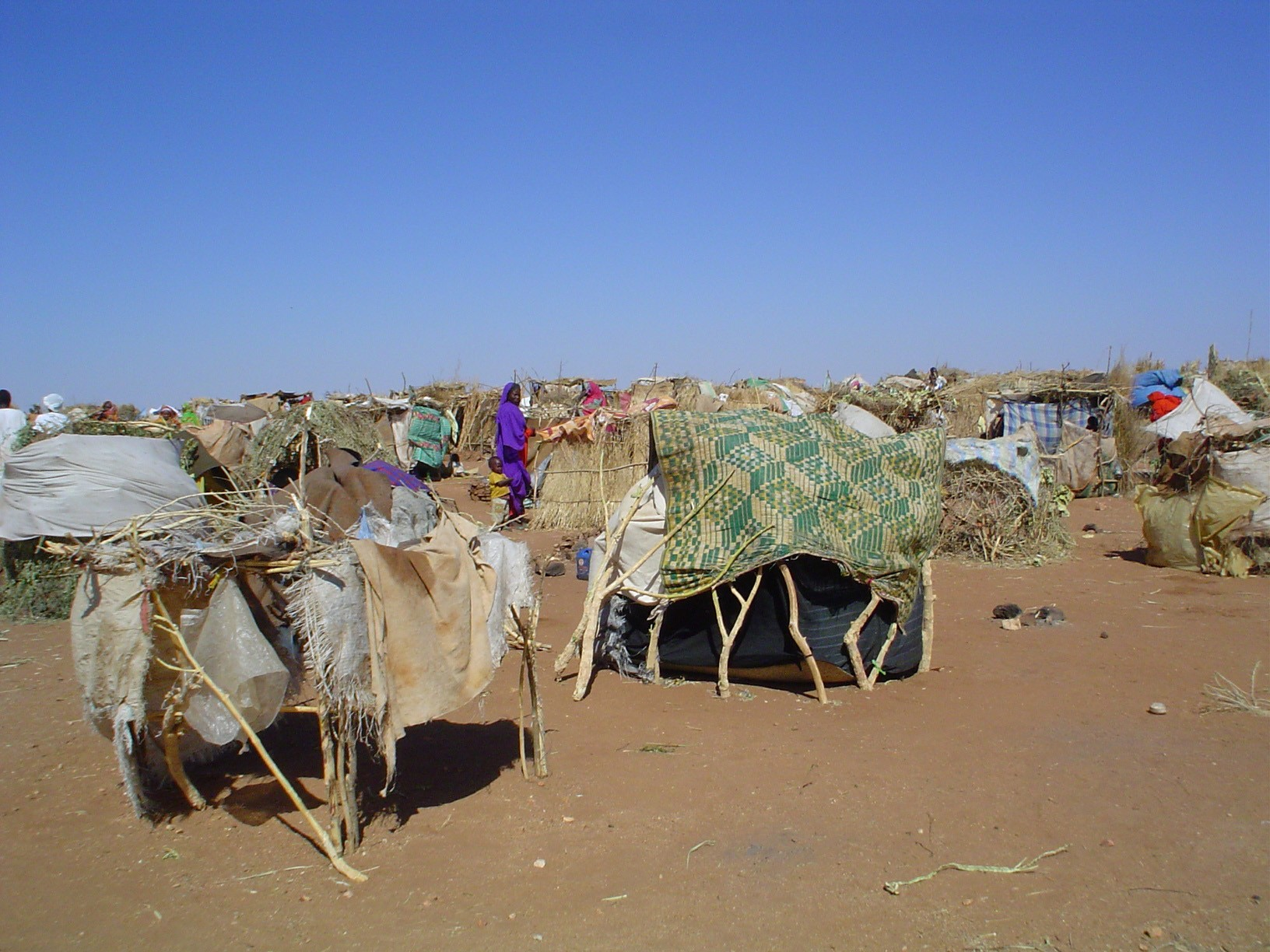
IDP camp near Nyala, South Darfur

Also on 9 September 2004, the US put forward a UN draft resolution threatening Sudan with sanctions on its oil industry. This was adopted, in modified form, on 18 September 2004 as Resolution 1564 (see below.)

On 13 September 2004, WHO published a Darfur mortality survey, which was the first reliable indicator about deaths in Darfur. It reported that 6,000–10,000 people were dying each month in Darfur. Many were related to diarrhoea, but the most significant cause of death was violent death for those aged 15–49. The Darfur mortality rates were significantly higher than the emergency threshold, and were from 3 to 6 times higher than the normal African death rates.

On 18 September 2004, the United Nations Security Council passed Resolution 1564, pressuring the Sudanese government to act urgently to improve the situation by threatening the possibility of oil sanctions in the event of continued noncompliance with Resolution 1556 or refusal to accept the expansion of African Union peacekeepers. Resolution 1564 also established an International Commission of Inquiry to look into human rights violations, and to determine whether genocide was occurring. In the wake of this resolution, the peacekeeper force was to be expanded to 4,500 troops.

On 30 September 2004, during the first of three U.S. presidential debates at the University of Miami in Coral Gables, Florida, Jim Lehrer, the moderator, asked why neither candidate had discussed committing troops to Darfur. Senator John Kerry replied that "one of the reasons we can't do it is we're overextended," but agreed that he'd use American forces "to some degree to coalesce the African Union." President Bush cited aid committed to the region and agreed that action should be taken through the African Union. Both candidates agreed that what was happening in Darfur was genocide.

=== October 2004 ===
On 15 October 2004, World Health Organization official David Nabarro estimated that 70,000 people had died of disease and malnutrition in Darfur since March.

On 17 October 2004 in a meeting between leaders of Libya, Sudan, Egypt, Nigeria and Chad, the idea of foreign intervention was rejected. They stated that they believe it to be a purely African matter. Egyptian presidency spokesman Magued Abdel Fattah said that the international community should "provide Sudan with assistance to allow it to fulfil its obligations under UN resolutions (on Darfur) rather than putting pressure on it and issuing threats."

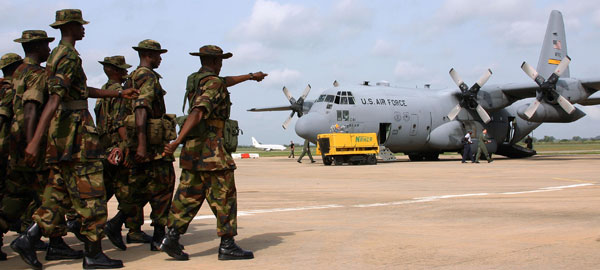
The United States transported Nigerian soldiers on 28 October

The African Union had expected to have 3,000 additional troops in place in the region sometime in November, but cited lack of funds and 'logistical difficulties' in delaying this deployment, waiting on the AU's Peace and Security Council to meet on 20 October and decide on the expanded duties and numbers of the force. It was decided that these AU troops, from both Nigeria and Rwanda, will be deployed by 30 October.

The United Nations pledged $100 million to support the force, about half of the $221 million cost to keep them deployed for a year. The European Union mobilised the remainder, an additional EUR 80 million on 26 October from their African Peace Facility to support the deployment and operations of the 3144-strong AU observer mission which will monitor the implementation of the cease-fire agreement.

Peace talks between Sudan and Darfur rebels were scheduled to resume on 21 October in Abuja, Nigeria. However, rebels showed up late and the talks did not begin until 25 October. Two more rebel groups now want in on the negotiations, and an existing cease-fire agreement is considered shaky. The talks are still in progress, but a humanitarian agreement is expected to be hammered out during the course of the talks.

=== November 2004 ===
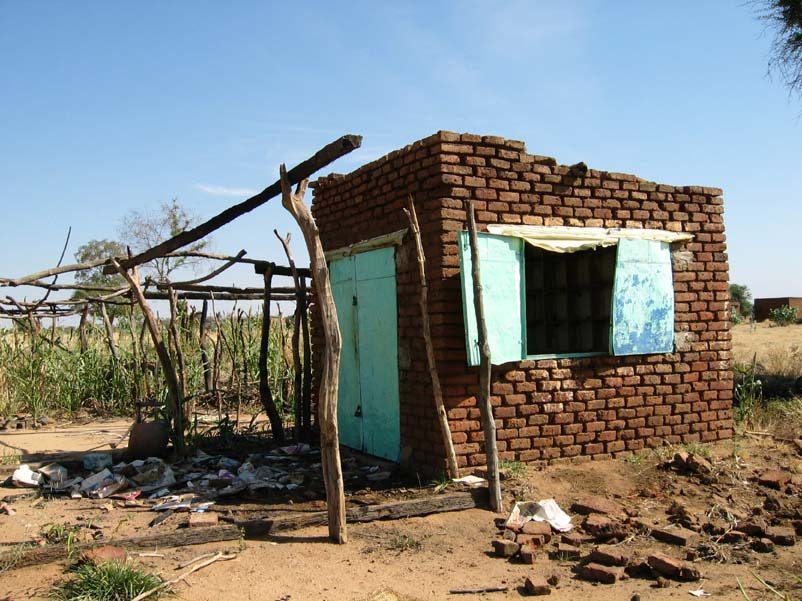
A village health post destroyed by a Janjaweed militia attack

On 2 November the United Nations reports that Sudanese troops have raided the Abu Sharif and Otash refugee camps near Nyala in Darfur, moving a number of inhabitants and denying aid agencies access to the remaining inhabitants inside. Meanwhile, the Abuja talks continued, with attempts made to agree on a no-fly zone over Darfur in addition to a truce on land and a disarmament of the militias.

A third UN resolution is being considered, calling for a speedy end to the conflict.

On 9 November the Sudanese government and the two leading rebel groups, the Justice and Equality Movement (JEM) and the Sudan Liberation Movement (SLM), signed two accords aimed toward short-term progress in resolving the Darfur conflict. The first accord established a no-fly zone over rebel-controlled areas of Darfur—a measure designed to end the Sudanese military's bombing of rebel villages in the region. The second accord granted international humanitarian aid agencies unrestricted access to the Darfur region. The accords were the product of African Union sponsored peace talks in Abuja that began 25 October. Delegates stated that a later round of negotiations expected to begin in mid-December would work on a longer-term political accord. The talks may have produced the breakthrough accords because of a looming meeting of the UN Security Council, which many expected would have imposed oil sanctions on the Sudanese government if progress had not been made.

Despite the 9 November accords, violence in Sudan continued. On 10 November—one day after the accords—the Sudanese military conducted attacks on Darfur refugee villages in plain sight of UN and African Union observers. On 22 November, alleging that Janjaweed members had refused to pay for livestock in the town market of Tawila in Northern Darfur, rebels attacked the town's government-controlled police stations. The Sudanese military retaliated on 23 November by bombing the town.

=== January 2005 ===
The International Commission of Inquiry on Darfur hand their report to the Secretary General on 25 January. The Commission found that the Government of the Sudan and the Janjaweed are responsible for serious violations of international human rights and humanitarian law amounting to crimes under international law. But the Commission stopped short of calling it genocide. The Commission identified 51 individuals responsible for the violation of human rights and recommended immediate trial at the International Criminal Court.

=== March 2005 ===
On 7 March, UN Secretary General Kofi Annan spoke to the UN Security Council requesting that the peacekeeping force in Darfur be increased to support the 2000 African Union troops already deployed. A resolution for the deployment of an additional 10,000 peacekeepers has been delayed by the failure of the Security Council to agree on the mechanism to be used to try war criminals and the application and extent of sanctions. A number of Security Council members want war criminals to be tried by the International Criminal Court; the United States refused, however, to support that proposition. An African-run tribunal has been proposed as a countermeasure, and proposals have been made for trials to be held in Tanzania and Nigeria. The current resolution has also been criticized, as it is unclear as to whether the peacekeepers will be deployed to Darfur or to monitor peace in the south of Sudan. On 24 March a peacekeeping force was approved to monitor peace in the south of Sudan, however the Security Council still remains deadlocked over Darfur.

On 29 March United Nations Security Council Resolution 1591 was passed 11–0. The Resolution strengthened the arms embargo and imposed an asset freeze and travel ban on those deemed responsible for the atrocities in Darfur. It was agreed that war criminals will be tried by the International Criminal Court.

The United Nations released a new estimate of 180,000 who have died as a result of illness and malnutrition in the 18 months of the conflict. It has not attempted to estimate the number of violence-related deaths.

=== April 2005 ===
On 5 April it was reported that the UN has given the ICC the names of fifty-one people suspected of war crimes. The list may include high government officials of Sudan. The Sudanese Government has said it will not hand over the suspects.

The sealed list, presented to the International Criminal Court, was drawn up following an investigation by the UN into claims of killings, torture and rape committed by Government forces and militias in the Darfur region. Sudanese President Omar al-Bashir, backed by huge protests against the UN in Sudan's capital of Khartoum, snubbed the UN resolution passed on 29 March to bring the suspects to trial before the court, adding that he "shall never hand any Sudanese national to a foreign court."

On 29 April it was reported that the administration of U.S. President George W. Bush had forged a "close intelligence partnership" with the Sudanese government despite their presence on the U.S. list of state sponsors of international terrorism and the declaration of genocide in Darfur by that administration's former Secretary of State, Colin Powell.

=== May 2005 ===
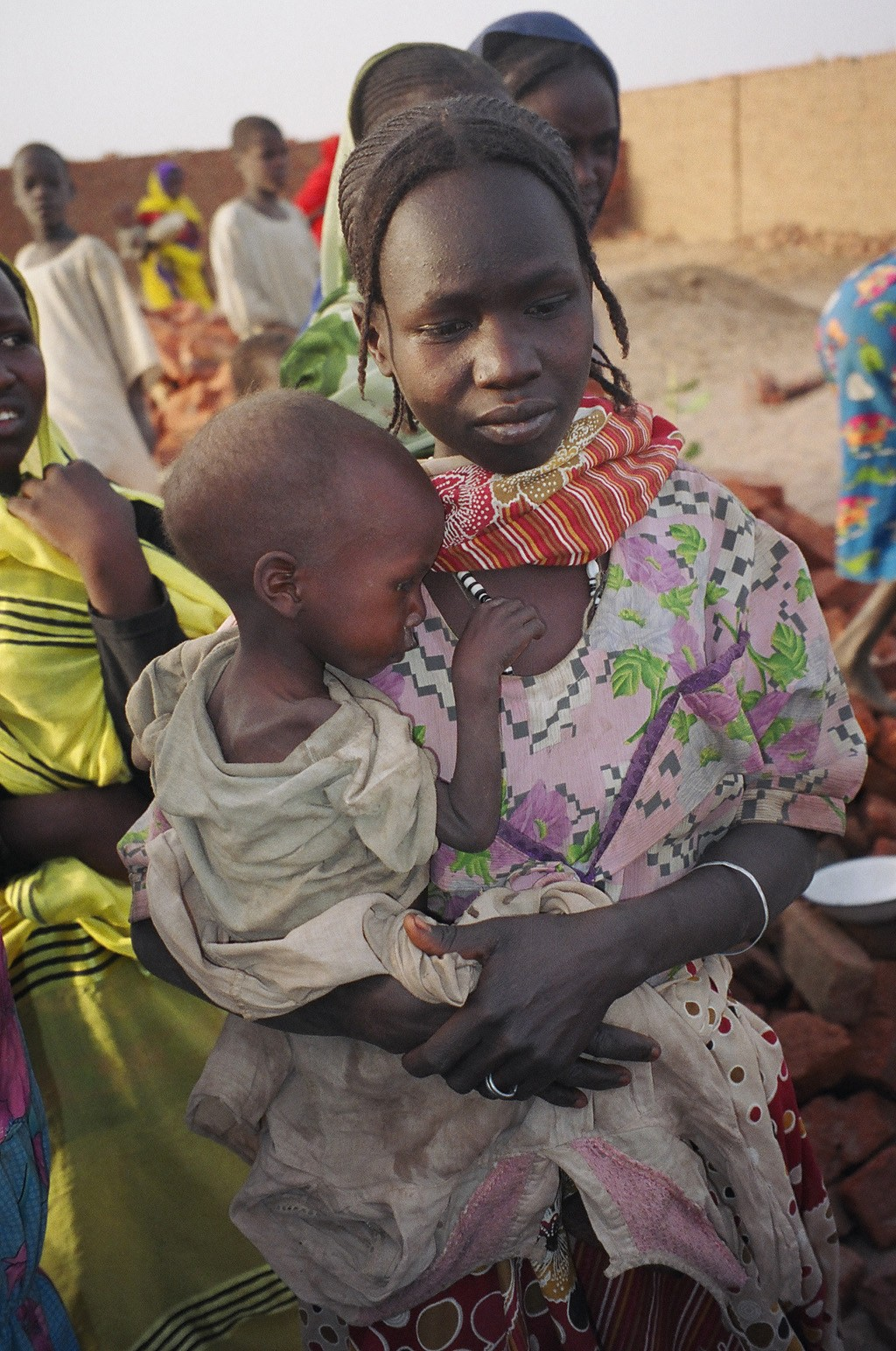
IDP mother and malnourished child in North Darfur

Libyan leader Muammar al-Gaddafi has somewhat championed the cause of African unity. This sentiment has led him to invite the leaders of Sudan, Nigeria, Egypt, Chad and Eritrea to a summit in Tripoli regarding the conflict in Darfur.

The two main rebel groups in Darfur, the Sudan Liberation Movement and the Justice and Equality Movement, announced they wanted to resume peace talks. Previous negotiations were to be disbanded in favor of new dialogue hoping to solve their differences.

It seems that a possible hinge of the negotiations is compliance or refusal of handing over war crime suspects to organizations such as the International Criminal Court in The Hague.

Médecins Sans Frontières doctor Paul Foreman was arrested by Sudanese authorities over the publication of a report detailing hundreds of rapes in Darfur.

Claims began to surface that the Bush administration's noticeable toning down of its description of the situation in Sudan - it stopped calling the Darfur conflict a genocide, and claimed that United Nations death toll estimates may be too high - was due to increased co-operation from Sudanese officials towards the war on terrorism. The claim asserted that Major General Salah Abdallah Gosh who is said to have been involved in training the Janjaweed, was flown to Washington for high-level talks with his United States counterparts, related to global terrorism.

=== June 2005 ===
The International Criminal Court announces an investigation into crimes against humanity related to the conflict that is taking place in Darfur.

Rep. Henry Hyde (R-IL) introduces the Darfur Peace and Accountability Act in the House on 30 June.

=== July 2005 ===
Security in the region is improving, according to the commander of the African Union peacekeeping force. There have been no major conflicts since January, and the numbers of attacks on villages has been dropping. There are currently around 3,000 troops there to keep the peace, and more are due to arrive in the coming months, expecting to reach 7,000 troops in September. In keeping with a decision made by the Peace and Security Council, Nigeria sent a battalion of 680 troops on Wednesday, 13 July 2005 with two more coming soon thereafter. Rwanda will send a battalion of troops, Senegal, Gambia, Kenya and South Africa will send troops as well. Canada is providing 105 armoured vehicles, training and maintenance assistance, and personal protective equipment in support of the efforts of the African Union Mission in Sudan (AMIS).

On 10 July, Ex-rebel leader John Garang was sworn in as Sudan's vice-president. A new constitution was adopted, and all parties should be represented more fairly. The United States Deputy Secretary of State Robert Zoellick has applauded the political changes and the improving security. Kofi Annan and South African President Thabo Mbeki watched the ceremony.

On 21 July, Sen. Sam Brownback (R-KS) introduces the Darfur Peace and Accountability Act in the Senate.

=== August 2005 ===
On 1 August, newly elected Sudanese vice-president John Garang, a former leader of the Sudan People's Liberation Army (SPLA) died in a helicopter crash. This has sparked renewed concerns throughout the international community, of Sudan's ability to unite in the face of alleged genocide.

The long-term implications of Garang's death are still unclear; and, despite the recently improved security, talks between the various rebels in the Darfur region are going slowly, with no sight of a final peace agreement.

=== September 2005 ===
On 15 September, a series of African Union mediated talks began in Abuja, Nigeria. Representatives of the Sudanese government and the two major rebel groups are participating in the talks, however the Sudan Liberation Movement faction refused to be present and according to a BBC reporter the SLM "will not recognise anything agreed at the talks".

=== October 2005 ===
After a government-supported Janjaweed militia attacked the Aro Sharow refugee village on 28 September, killing at least 32, the African Union on 1 October accused both the Sudanese government and rebels of violating the ceasefire agreement. Associated Press reports the African Union as condemning the government's "acts of 'calculated and wanton destruction' that have killed at least 44 people and displaced thousands over two weeks."

On 9 October, a rebel group abducted 18 members of an African Union peacekeeping team, but released most of them after negotiations.

Following an increase in fighting in the region, on 13 October the UN announced that it will withdraw all non-essential staff from Darfur. West Darfur is reportedly too dangerous for aid-agencies to operate.

=== November 2005 ===
Attacks on African Union peacekeepers by rebels led to the Sudanese government approving the deployment of 105 Grizzly armored personnel carriers donated by Canada to aid African Union peacekeeping forces in the western region of Darfur.

On 18 November, the United States Senate passes the Darfur Peace and Accountability Act by unanimous consent.

The seventh round of peace talks began on 21 November.

=== December 2005 ===
An attack on the Chadian town of Adré near the Sudanese border led to the deaths of three hundred rebels. Sudan was blamed for the attack, which was the second in the region in three days. The escalating tensions in the region led to the government of Chad declaring its hostility toward Sudan and calling for Chadian citizens to mobilise themselves against the "common enemy". (See Chad-Sudan conflict)

On 24 December, the United States Congress rejected Condoleezza Rice's request to restore $50 million in aid to the African Union that human rights groups say had been cut from the budget in November.

=== January 2006 ===
The Food and Agriculture Organization of the United Nations called for $40 million to support its agricultural relief and recovery activities in Sudan in 2006, stressing that humanitarian assistance needs to be coupled with longer-term development aid to ensure lasting peace in the country. The appeal is part of the 2006 Work Plan for Sudan, which outlines the activities to be carried out by the UN and its partners in the country in the coming year. "FAO's role is particularly crucial given the importance of agriculture in the country," said Anne M. Bauer, Director, FAO Emergency Operations and Rehabilitation Division.

The Save Darfur Coalition, representing over 160 humanitarian, faith-based, advocacy, and human rights organizations, launches its "Million Voices for Darfur" campaign to urge President Bush for a larger, more robust multinational peacekeeping force in Darfur.

=== February 2006 ===
On 3 February 2006, as the United States began its month-long presidency of the United Nations Security Council, the U.S. offered a motion to begin plans to send UN peacekeepers to Darfur. The Security Council agreed unanimously to begin the planning process to send the troops, with a final decision to come later. It called for a 12,000 to 20,000 troop presence in Darfur with the 7,000 African Union troops already there being given new weapons and being incorporated into the UN mission. Furthermore, they would have a greater mandate to protect civilians. Nevertheless, difficulties are expected to arise in finding states willing to contribute troops to the UN mission. Although the United States offered the motion, the U.S. is not expected to contribute troops to the mission. Also, Omar al-Bashir, the leader of Sudan who is widely believed to be backing the Janjaweed militias in Darfur, has also frequently stated his opposition to UN peacekeepers in Sudan further complicating the problem. Assuming these problems are overcome, UN troops are still not likely to appear in Darfur for nearly a year.

=== April 2006 ===
On 5 April 2006, the House passes the Darfur Peace and Accountability Act in a vote of 416 to 3.

A series of rallies were held to call for more aid and an increased role for international peacekeepers. The largest one was held on 30 April in Washington, D.C., on the National Mall, sponsored by the Save Darfur Coalition, American Jewish World Service, the Genocide Intervention Network, Students Taking Action Now: Darfur and dozens of others, where celebrities and lawmakers came together with nearly a hundred-thousand protesters. Students from at least 46 states attended the rally in Washington, D.C.

Dr. Eric Reeves released a report arguing that the number of deaths in Darfur had likely surpassed 450,000.

Osama bin Laden condemned peacekeepers in Darfur, claiming they conducted atrocities against Muslims. The government of Sudan distanced themselves from his statements, but continued their vociferous condemnations of any potential deployment of UN troops.

In a speech commemorating the victims of the Holocaust, Deputy Secretary of State Robert Zoellick connected the victims of Nazi aggression with those who died in Rwanda and continue to suffer in Darfur.

US Ambassador to the United Nations John Bolton presented a draft resolution calling for sanctions imposed on four people implicated in the continuing genocide in Darfur.

=== May 2006 ===
On 5 May 2006, the government of Sudan signed an accord with the Sudan Liberation Army (SLA). However, the agreement was rejected by two other, smaller groups, the Justice and Equality Movement and a rival faction of the SLA. The accord was orchestrated by the U.S. Deputy Secretary of State Robert B. Zoellick, Salim Ahmed Salim (working on behalf of the African Union), AU representatives, and other foreign officials operating in Abuja, Nigeria. The accord calls for the disarmament of the Janjaweed militia, and for the rebel forces to disband and be incorporated into the army. But the agreement, signed in Abuja, was rejected by a smaller SLM faction and the rebel Justice and Equality Movement.

Research by the UN indicated that violence in Darfur after the signing of the Darfur Peace Agreement actually increased. Within days of the deal, most sides continued hostilities reaching new levels of violence.

The African Union expressed willingness for the United Nations to replace them in peacekeeping duties in Darfur. The under-funded mission acknowledged the potential effectiveness of a fully equipped UN force. However, there was no indication from Sudan's government there would be permission for the entry of UN peacekeepers.

The humanitarian activist and rock singer Bono visited Darfur with an NBC reporter to raise awareness among the general public about the crisis.

=== June 2006 ===
On 19 June 2006, President al-Bashir insisted that he would prevent a UN peacekeeping force from entering Sudan. He stated:

"I swear that there will not be any international military intervention in Darfur as long as I am in power. Sudan, which was the first country south of the Sahara to gain independence, cannot now be the first country to be recolonized."

Al Bashir further blamed Jewish participation for causing the possible UN military presence:

"It is clear that there is a purpose behind the heavy propaganda and media campaigns.... If we return to the last demonstrations in the United States, and the groups that organized the demonstrations, we find that they are all Jewish organizations."

On 25 June 2006, the Sudanese Foreign Ministry spokesman Jamal Ibrahim announced the imposing of a partial ban on UN operations in Darfur, after accusing the UN of violating an agreement on its mandate by giving the rebel leader Suleiman Adam Jamous a helicopter ride.

On 29 June, the Save Darfur Coalition's "Million Voices for Darfur" campaign formally ended with Senate Majority Leader Bill Frist and Senator Hillary Clinton signing the 1,000,000th and 1,000,001st postcards, which called on President Bush to support a stronger multinational peacekeeping force in Darfur.

Deputy Secretary of State Robert B. Zoellick announced his resignation from the Bush administration. He served as the most outspoken voice against the Darfur genocide within the White House. Many anti-genocide organizations were concerned that his absence would lessen the administration's resolve in remaining proactive against the killings in Darfur.

The Japanese government announced that it would send $10 million in humanitarian aid for the victims of the genocide in Darfur. The assistance would reconstruct water supply facilities and medical supplies, among other things.

=== July 2006 ===
The Sudanese government launched new attacks against rebel positions in West Darfur. The attacks were significant in that they were the first overt military operation conducted by the government since they signed the Darfur Peace Agreement.

At the 2006 African Union summit held in Banjul, Gambia, it was decided that AU peacekeepers would remain in Darfur until the end of 2006 at the request of the United Nations; however, a request to allow UN peacekeepers into the area was refused by Omar Hassan al-Bashir. Jan Pronk, head of the United Nations mission in Sudan, claims that fighting has worsened since a peace deal was signed two months ago, stating that "It's non-implementation of the text which is creating a problem, not the text."

Relations between Chad and Sudan worsened to the point where Sudanese officials insisted that all Chadian troops in the AU peacekeeping force leave immediately.

S. Res. 531 was introduced in the Senate by Sens. Joseph Lieberman (D-CT), Conrad Burns (R-MT) and ten other bipartisan co-sponsors. The Lieberman-Burns Envoy Resolution urged President Bush to send a Presidential Special Envoy to Sudan to fully implement the Darfur Peace Agreement.

Increased fighting has hampered humanitarian groups in Darfur. Oxfam temporarily closed two of its offices in Northern Darfur following the capture of one of their employees. The aid agency also cited increasing insecurity and called on the international community to strengthen the African Union force.

A Reuters poll, consisting of over 100 humanitarian experts named Sudan as the world's most dangerous spot for children.

At a UN donor conference in Brussels, Assistant Secretary for African Affairs Jendayi Frazer stated that the United States would not fund the AU peacekeeping force past September 2006. This caused consternation amongst the anti-genocide movements in the United States, as the UN peacekeeping force would be deployed at the earliest in January 2007.

At the same conference, eight humanitarian groups, including CARE International, Islamic Relief and Oxfam International, insisted that AU troops in Darfur were bound to fail unless funding was dramatically increased.

On 31 July, UN Secretary-General Kofi Annan proposed a UN peacekeeping force of roughly 24,000 for Darfur. In Annan's proposal, about 5,300 international police officers would deploy initially, followed by the main UN force.

=== August 2006 ===
Tomo Križnar, a Slovenian special envoy to Sudan, will stand trial there on charges of espionage. He was arrested in July for not possessing the proper entry visa. He admits to entering the country illegally, but denies charges of spying.

The National Foreign Trade Council, a group representing more than 300 multinational companies, challenged Illinois' ban on Sudan-related investments. The Illinois law removed about $1 billion in pension funds from companies operating in or doing business with Sudan. The NFTC's lawsuit will claim that this law is unconstitutional based on a previous U.S. Supreme Court ruling that struck down a Massachusetts ban on investments in companies operating in Burma.

On 17 August, the Genocide Intervention Network released the first Darfur congressional scorecard rating members of the United States Congress on legislative action relating to Darfur.

On 31 August, the United Nations Security Council passed a resolution calling for a UN peacekeeping force to expand from Southern Sudan into Darfur, with the permission of the government of Sudan. The resolution passed with 12 votes in favor and three abstentions, by China, Russia and Qatar. The government of Sudan immediately announced its opposition to the expansion of the peacekeeping force.

=== October 2006 ===
On 13 October, President Bush signed into law the Darfur Peace and Accountability Act, previously passed by the House and Senate. The bill restated the government's opinion that genocide was being committed, directed support to the African Union peacekeeping force in Darfur, endorsed assistance for the International Criminal Court investigation and imposed some economic sanctions. Bush also signed a companion executive order specifying in detail these sanctions.

=== April 2007 ===
In accord with mounting national and global concern over the situation in Darfur, on 18 April President Bush gave a speech at the US Holocaust Memorial Museum criticizing the Sudanese government and threatened the use of sanctions if the situation does not improve. President Bush stated that "The time for promises is over – President Bashir must act", according to Bush failure to do so would result in sanctions barring all dollar transactions between the United States and Sudan and block interaction with 29 Sudanese businesses.

=== May 2007 ===
The USA imposed stiff economic sanctions against Sudan on 30 May. It has added 31 additional companies to an already existing sanctions list, barring them from any dollar transactions within the United States financial system. Of those companies, 30 are controlled by the Sudanese government, and at least one is violating an embargo against shipping arms to Darfur. The US administration also targeted three individuals by blocking their overseas assets. Two of them are Sudanese government officials, Ahmad Muhammed Harun and Awad Ibn Auf (head of Sudan's military intelligence and security). The third person, Khalil Ibrahim, is the leader of the rebel Justice and Equality Movement. Secretary of State Condoleezza Rice sought United Nations approval for an international resolution to impose a broad arms embargo against Sudan and to bar the Sudanese government from conducting any offensive military flights in Darfur.

=== June 2007 ===
Oxfam announced on 17 June that it is permanently pulling out of Gereida, the largest camp in Darfur, where more than 130,000 have sought refuge. The agency cited inaction by local authorities from the Sudan Liberation Movement (SLM), which controls the region, in addressing security concerns and violence against aid workers. An employee of the NGO Action by Churches Together was murdered in June in West Darfur. Hijackings of vehicles belonging to the UN and other international organizations continued, contributing to their decision.

=== July 2007 ===
On 28 July, Steven Spielberg said that he may no longer be involved with the 2008 Olympic Games if China does not do more to end the conflict. China responded saying that Steven Spielberg had never accepted the job to be "no longer" part of it.

By then end of July, the US House of Representatives was preparing legislation that would prohibit companies with ties to the Sudanese government from receiving federal contracts.

On 31 July, United Nations Security Council Resolution 1769 was passed unanimously, creating a hybrid AU/UN peacekeeping operation in Darfur.

=== August 2007 ===
On 18 August, A Small Arms Survey research paper reported that while China continued to give the Sudanese government financial and military aid, global pressure and negative media attention ahead of China hosting the 2008 Olympic Games have pushed Beijing to use its influence in the area "more wisely". Chinese President Hu Jintao warned the Sudanese President about Darfur in 2007.

On 19 August, the Israeli government said that further refugees coming to Israel illegally from Darfur via Egypt would be expelled, prompting criticism from human rights groups. Israel has accepted 2,800 African refugees in recent years, 1,160 of them Sudanese and 400 of those from Darfur. The previous evening, Israelhad expelled 50 African refugees of unspecified nationality back to Egypt. As the refugees had already found refuge in Egypt, they have for the most part been motivated by economic concerns and are seeking employment in Israel, although there have been complaints of ill treatment in Egypt. Israel had requested to Egypt to monitor the border for further migrants. At times, Egyptian security forces beat and shot at migrants trying to cross the border, killing some. Many others have been arrested. Israel has decided to offer asylum to 500 Darfurians who are already in the country, and donate $5 million to aid refugees of Darfur.

=== September 2007 ===
On 5 September, the Israeli newspaper, Haaretz reported that Israel decided to grant citizenship to several hundred refugees from Darfur who were currently in the country.

=== July 2008 ===
On 15 July, prosecutors at the International Criminal Court (ICC), filed ten charges of war crimes against Sudan's President Omar al-Bashir, three counts of genocide, five of crimes against humanity and two of murder. This marks the first time charges of genocide have been filed by the ICC against a sitting Head of State. The ICC's prosecutor for Darfur, Luis Moreno-Ocampo, is expected within months to ask a panel of ICC judges to issue an arrest warrant for al-Bashir.

=== October 2008 ===
In October 2008 ICC asked the prosecutor for more information to support the charges.

=== March 2009 ===
On 4 March, the International Criminal Court issued the arrest warrant against Omar al-Bashir for war crimes in Sudan. The court did not conclude that there was sufficient evidence to charge Omar al-Bashir for genocide, but affirmed the indictment for five counts of crimes against humanity and two counts of war crimes relating to the Darfur counter-insurgency conflict. The warrant alleges violations such as murder, rape, extermination, forcible transfer, torture, pillaging, and attacks against civilian populations.

=== December 2009 ===
On 3 December 2009, Three Rwandan soldiers were killed and two wounded in an ambush by gunmen while escorting a water tanker. Two more Rwandan soldiers were killed and one wounded by a gunman firing from a crowd on 7 December.

=== May 2010 ===
On 7 May 2010, Two Egyptian soldiers were killed, and three wounded in an ambush on their patrol by unidentified gunmen. The Egyptian forces returned fire, and the gunmen fled.

== See also ==
- History of Sudan, for a broader view of the events that have caused the current conflict
- Chad-Sudan conflict
- Darfur conflict
- Cases before the International Criminal Court#Darfur, Sudan
- African Union Mission in Sudan
- United States policy on conflict mitigation and reconciliation in Sudan
- Organizations
  - Save Darfur Coalition
  - Genocide Intervention Network
  - STAND: A Student Anti-Genocide Coalition
  - United States Holocaust Memorial Museum
- Acts and Legislation
  - United Nations Security Council Resolution 1706, authorizing a UN peacekeeping force
  - United Nations Security Council Resolution 1769, creating a hybrid UN-African Union peacekeeping force
  - United Nations Security Council Resolution 1935
  - Darfur Peace and Accountability Act
