= United Nations Security Council Resolution 1653 =

UN Security Council Resolution 1653
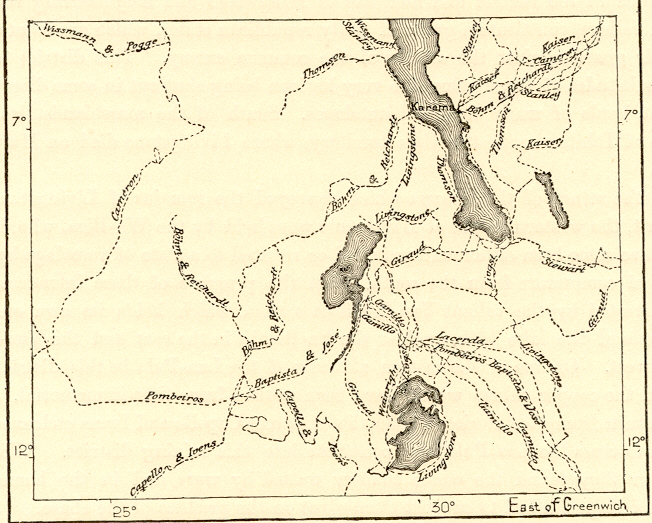
- Colonial-era map of the Great Lakes region
- Date: 27 January 2006
- Meeting no.: 5,359
- Code: S/RES/1653 (Document)
- Subject: The situation in the African Great Lakes region
- Voting summary: 15 voted for; None voted against; None abstained
- Result: Adopted

Security Council composition
- Permanent members: China; France; Russia; United Kingdom; United States
- Non-permanent members: Argentina; Rep. of the Congo; Denmark; Ghana; Greece; Japan; Peru; Qatar; Slovakia; Tanzania

United Nations Security Council Resolution 1653, adopted unanimously on January 27, 2006, after recalling previous resolutions concerning the situations in the African Great Lakes region, Democratic Republic of the Congo and Burundi, particularly resolutions 1625 (2005), 1631 (2005), 1649 (2005) and 1650 (2005), the Council addressed the stability of the Great Lakes region in Africa.

Foreign ministers from more than 10 countries participated in the Security Council discussion prior to the vote.

== Resolution ==
=== Observations ===
In the preamble of the resolution, the Security Council reaffirmed the principles of territorial integrity, sovereignty, unity, good-neighbourliness, non-interference and co-operation among states in the Great Lakes region. It condemned the 1994 Rwandan genocide and subsequent conflicts in the region which resulted in widespread violations of human rights and international humanitarian law.

Meanwhile, council members were aware of the connection between the illegal exploitation of natural resources and arms trafficking in fuelling the conflicts in the Great Lakes region, particularly the Democratic Republic of the Congo. There was concern at the impact of the conflicts on the humanitarian situation throughout the region and the implications on the region's security and stability, which was apparent in cases of cross-border movements by armed groups such as the Lord's Resistance Army, which had resulted in the deaths and displacement of people in northern Uganda, the Democratic Republic of the Congo and Sudan.

The resolution welcomed dialogue between countries in the region, and recalling previous resolutions which called for an international conference on peace and security in the African Great Lakes, noted that such a conference had taken place in Dar es Salaam, Sudan in November 2004. At the same time, regional achievements were praised, including a new democratic government in Burundi and democratic transition in the Democratic Republic of the Congo. The United Nations Mission in the Democratic Republic of the Congo (MONUC) and United Nations Operation in Burundi (ONUB) were commended for their efforts.

=== Acts ===
The Security Council urged countries in the region to continue to promote good relations, peaceful co-existence and the resolution of disputes. The countries were also urged to respect human rights, including those of women and children, and to promote good governance, the rule of law and democratic practices. Furthermore, the Council requested the concerned countries to bring those responsible for violations of human rights to justice.

The text of the resolution condemned the activities of armed groups and militia in the region, including the Democratic Forces for the Liberation of Rwanda, Palipehutu and Lord's Resistance Army. There was a need for disarmament, demobilisation and reintegration of ex-combatants, according to the Council. It emphasised the need to protect civilians and humanitarian workers from attacks and put an end to attacks from armed groups; the Secretary-General was asked to provide recommendations on how best to support efforts in this regard.

The resolution concluded by asking states not to allow their territory to be used by armed groups for attacks on others, to tackle the cross-border movements of arms and armed groups and to co-operate in the repatriation of foreign groups.

== See also ==
- List of conflicts in Africa
- List of United Nations Security Council Resolutions 1601 to 1700 (2005–2006)
