= United Nations Security Council Resolution 1590 =

UN Security Council Resolution 1590
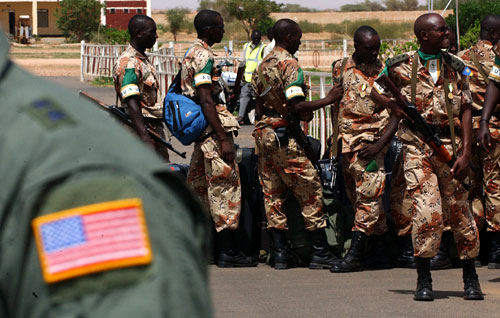
- Rwandan UNMIS troops
- Date: 24 March 2005
- Meeting no.: 5,151
- Code: S/RES/1590 (Document)
- Subject: The situation concerning Sudan
- Voting summary: 15 voted for; None voted against; None abstained
- Result: Adopted

Security Council composition
- Permanent members: China; France; Russia; United Kingdom; United States
- Non-permanent members: Algeria; Argentina; Benin; Brazil; Denmark; Greece; Japan; Philippines; Romania; Tanzania

United Nations Security Council Resolution 1590, adopted unanimously on 24 March 2005, after recalling resolutions 1547 (2004), 1556 (2004), 1564 (2004), 1574 (2004), 1585 (2005) and 1588 (2005) on the situation in Sudan, the Council established the United Nations Mission in Sudan (UNMIS) for an initial period of six months.

The passage of the resolution created the United Nations' 17th active peacekeeping mission. The vote on the resolution primarily concerning South Sudan was delayed by three weeks due to disagreements over the situation in nearby Darfur.

== Observations ==
The Security Council welcomed the signing of the Comprehensive Peace Agreement in January 2005 by the Sudanese government and Sudan People's Liberation Army/Movement. The parties were urged to bring about peace and stability in Darfur and prevent further violations of human rights and international humanitarian law, and end impunity. Such violations of human rights and of the ceasefire were condemned.

The preamble of the resolution also expressed concern about the humanitarian situation and the safety of humanitarian aid workers. It was alarmed at the continuing violence in Darfur and noted that the parties to the Comprehensive Peace Agreement had requested the presence of a peacekeeping mission. The Council considered the situation to be a threat to international peace and security.

== Acts ==
The Security Council decided to establish UNMIS for an initial period of six months, with 10,000 military and 715 police personnel. It was instructed to co-operate with the African Union Mission in Sudan (AMIS) and had the following mandate:

(a) support the implementation of the Comprehensive Peace Agreement;
(b) facilitate the delivery of humanitarian assistance and with the return of refugees and internally displaced persons;
(c) assist in demining efforts;
(d) contribute towards the protection of human rights and the protection of civilians.

The parties were urged to guarantee the safety and freedom of movement of UNMIS and humanitarian personnel, further emphasising that there could be no military solution to the conflict in Darfur. Meanwhile, the Secretary-General Kofi Annan was asked to transfer responsibilities from the United Nations Advance Mission in Sudan (UNAMIS) to UNMIS, and to keep the Council regularly informed on developments.

The resolution demanded strict adherence to the zero tolerance policy on sexual exploitation. Furthermore, acting under Chapter VII of the United Nations Charter, UNMIS was authorised to use force if necessary to protect personnel, civilians and facilities during the course of its mandate. The Council also asked for an increase in the deployment of human rights monitors to the Darfur region.

== See also ==
- African Union Mission in Sudan
- African Union – United Nations Hybrid Operation in Darfur
- International response to the War in Darfur
- List of United Nations Security Council Resolutions 1501 to 1600 (2003–2005)
- Southern Sudan
- Timeline of the War in Darfur
- War in Darfur
