= African Union Mission in Sudan =

Peacekeeping mission in Sudan

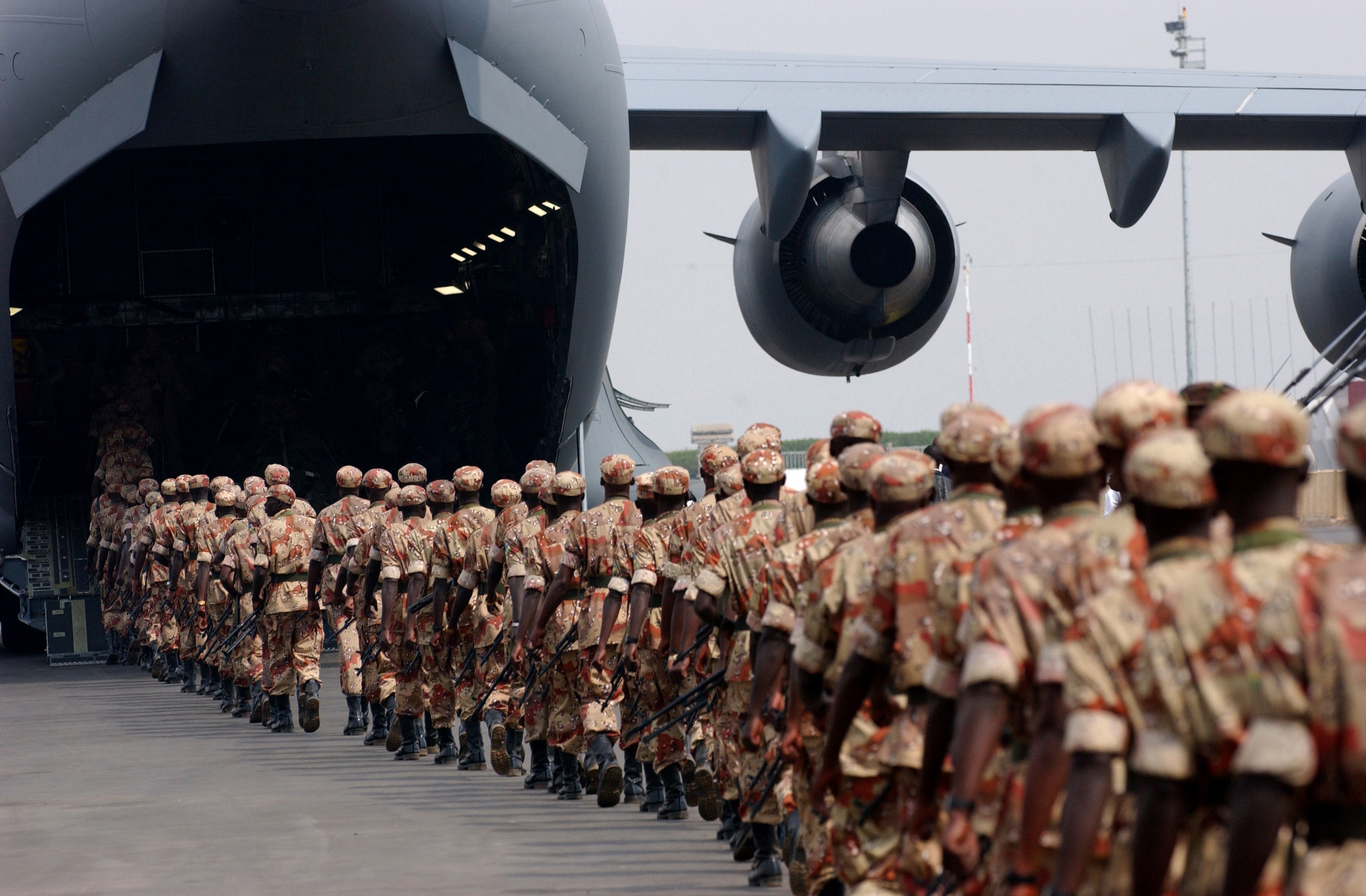
AMIS soldiers from Rwanda preparing to depart to Darfur in 2005.

The African Union Mission in Sudan (AMIS) was an African Union (AU) peacekeeping force operating primarily in the country's western region of Darfur to perform peacekeeping operations related to the Darfur conflict. It was founded in 2004, with a force of 150 troops. By mid-2005, its numbers were increased to about 7,000. Under United Nations Security Council Resolution 1564, AMIS was to "closely and continuously liaise and coordinate ... at all levels" its work with the United Nations Mission in Sudan (UNMIS). AMIS was the only external military force in Sudan's Darfur region until UNAMID was established. It was not able to effectively contain the violence in Darfur. A more sizable, better equipped UN peacekeeping force was originally proposed for September 2006, but due to Sudanese government opposition, it was not implemented at that time. AMIS' mandate was extended repeatedly throughout 2006, while the situation in Darfur continued to escalate, until AMIS was replaced by UNAMID on 31 December 2007.

== Overview (2004–2006) ==
AMIS originated in early July 2004, when both the African Union and European Union sent monitors to monitor the Darfur crisis cease-fire signed in April 2004. In August 2004, the African Union sent 150 Rwandan troops to protect the ceasefire monitors. It, however, soon became apparent that 150 troops would not be enough, so they were joined by 150 Nigerian troops. In April 2005, after the government of Sudan signed a ceasefire agreement with Sudan People's Liberation Army which led to the end of the Second Sudanese Civil War, the AMIS force was increased by 600 troops and 80 military observers. In July 2005, the force was increased by about 3,300 (with a budget of 220 million dollars). In April 2005, AMIS was increased to about 7,000 (at a cost of over 450 million dollars), and as of January 2007, this remains its projected strength.

== International response (2004) ==
In September of that year, the United Nations Security Council passed Resolution 1564, which gave Sudan the ultimatum of accepting an expanded AU force or facing sanctions of their oil industry. The African Union had hoped to have 3,000 more additional troops in place in the region sometime in November, but could not do so because of a lack of money and difficulty with logistics. The AU resolved that all parties involved would wait on the AU's Peace and Security Council to meet on 20 October 2004 and decide on the expanded duties and numbers of the force. It was decided that these Nigerian and Rwandan AU troops would be deployed by 30 October.

== Attempted reconciliation (2005) ==
On 9 November, the government of Sudan and the two leading rebel groups, the Justice and Equality Movement (JEM) and the Sudanese Liberation Army (SLA), signed two short term peace agreements aimed toward progress in ending the conflict. The first treaty established a no-fly zone over rebel-controlled areas of Darfur, a measure designed to end the Sudanese military's bombing of rebel villages in the region. The second accord granted international humanitarian aid agencies unrestricted access to the Darfur region. The accords were the product of African Union sponsored peace talks in Abuja that began 25 October 2004.

To support the Comprehensive Peace Agreement signed by the government of Sudan and the Sudan People's Liberation Movement on 9 January 2005, to perform certain functions relating to humanitarian assistance, protection, promotion of human rights, and to support AMIS, the UN Security Council established the United Nations Mission In Sudan (UNMIS) under Resolution 1590 on 24 March 2005 because the Security Council deemed the situation in Darfur to be a "threat to peace and international security."

July 2005 saw that there had been no major conflicts since January, and the numbers of attacks on villages was dropping. At the time, there were about 3,000 AMIS troops to keep the peace, and more due to arrive in the coming months, eventually reaching 7,000 troops in April. In keeping with a decision made by the Peace and Security Council, Nigeria sent a battalion of 680 troops on Wednesday, 13 July 2005, with two more coming soon thereafter. Rwanda will send a battalion of troops, Senegal, Gambia, Kenya and South Africa will send troops as well. Canada is providing 105 armoured vehicles, training and maintenance assistance, and personal protective equipment in support of the efforts of the AMIS.

On 15 September, a series of African Union mediated talks began in Abuja, Nigeria between representatives of the Sudanese government and the two major rebel groups. However, the SLM faction refused to be present and according to a BBC reporter the SLM "will not recognise anything agreed at the talks." After a government-supported Arab militia attacked the Aro Sharow refugee camp on 28 September, killing at least 32, the African Union on 1 October accused both the Sudanese government and rebels of violating the ceasefire agreement. The Associated Press reports the African Union as condemning the government's acts of calculated and wanton destruction that have killed at least 44 people and displaced thousands over two weeks.

== Attacks on the African Union (2005) ==
Forces from the Sudanese rebel group, the Justice and Equality Movement (JEM), assisted in liberating 38 African Union (AU) personnel that had been taken hostage on 9 October. The kidnapped personnel consisted of the original 18 hostages as well as a 20-man rescue team. All were released on 10 October. Initially, two hostages remained but were freed following a reported shootout with the kidnappers. A splinter group of JEM was blamed for the attack, but Mohamed Saleh, the head of the dissident faction, has denied the allegations.

Saleh was the military head of JEM when it signed a ceasefire agreement in April, but later split with the group's leadership. It is said that he subsequently commanded "thousands" of troops in the Darfur region, and is looking for a seat at the ongoing peace talks. He accused the AU of taking sides, and stated that he will not honour the ceasefire. While speaking with Reuters, Saleh said, "We want the AU to leave, and we have warned them not to travel to our areas. We don't know and don't care what is happening to the AU, they are part of the conflict now."

Violence in the region continued to rise. According to BBC correspondent Jonah Fisher, hostilities toward AU peacekeepers became more common as 2005 progressed. It has been noted that aid agencies are refusing to travel with African Union personnel, stating that the mere presence of the peacekeepers may draw fire. Kofi Annan, at a press conference in Geneva, responded to the rising violence by suggesting aid to the region may be partially suspended.

"Both rebels and government must understand that, if these incidents continue, it will impede humanitarian assistance and delivery." This marked the first time the African Union has suffered casualties in the region. Three personnel were killed in attacks believed to be perpetrated by the Sudan Liberation Army (SLA).

Despite the violence, the SLA, JEM, and the AU have promised to continue the peace talks which are being held in Abuja. In November 2005 in response to attacks on African Union troops, the government of Sudan agreed to the deployment of 105 armoured personnel carriers from Canada which were to arrive on 17 November, also another round, the seventh, of peace talks started on 21 November 2005.

== Failed UN handover and mandate extensions (2006–2007) ==
On 31 March 2006, the mandate of AMIS would have run out, with the African Union force already on the ground to be incorporated into a UN peacekeeping mission. Nevertheless, during a 10 March 2006 meeting of the African Union's Peace and Security Council, the Council decided to expand the mission for six months until 30 September 2006. On 31 August, after United Nations Security Council Resolution 1706 failed to see the implementation of its proposed UN peacekeeping force of 20,000 due to opposition from the government of Sudan, on 2 October the AU extended AMIS' mandate further, until 31 December 2006, and then again until 30 June 2007.

In May 2007, the AU declared that AMIS was on the point of collapse. In the previous month seven peacekeepers had been killed, while lack of funding had caused soldiers' salaries to go unpaid for several months. Rwanda and Senegal warned that they would withdraw their forces if UN member nations did not live up to their commitments of funding and supplies. John Predergast of the International Crisis Group noted,

The big money problem is that the Americans and the Europeans promised over the last decade that as long as the Africans deployed in these kinds of situations, we would pay for the soldiers and equip them. And we haven't done it.

On 31 July 2007, the United Nations Security Council approved by United Nations Security Council Resolution 1769 the mandate for UNAMID, which was to take over operations from AMIS by 31 December 2007.

AMIS was merged into UNAMID on 31 December 2007.

== 30 September 2007 raid on AU base ==
On 30 September 2007, a major raid on an AU base, mounted by approximately 1,000 Sudan Liberation Army rebels, claimed the lives of at least 10 peacekeepers and wounded many more. At least 50 personnel were initially unaccounted for but were later recovered. The attack occurred just after sunset in the northern part of Darfur province, and comes amid increasing tensions and violence between the separatist rebels and foreign peacekeepers, with the latter often accused of abrogating their neutrality and bias towards the central government.

== Peacekeeper fatalities ==
AMIS deaths by nationality

Nigeria: 14
Rwanda: 7
Senegal: 6
Ghana: 1
Botswana: 1
Egypt: 1
India: 1
Mali: 1
Unidentified: 1

TOTAL: 33

- Three Nigerian soldiers were killed in an ambush near Kourabashi on 8 October 2005, two AU civilian contractors were also killed in the attack.
- A Rwandan soldier was killed in a vehicle accident on 20 October 2005.
- One Nigerian soldier was killed when his patrol was attacked on the road between the AU camp and the town of Misteria on 29 May 2006. A Rwandan soldier was electrocuted on the same day.
- Two Rwandan soldiers were killed in an attack on a fuel convoy traveling from El Nahud to El Fasher in the Kutum area on 19 August 2006.
- A Rwandan soldier was killed in a vehicle accident on 26 October 2006.
- Two Nigerian soldiers were abducted in El Fasher on 10 December 2006, one was later released but the other was not and is presumed dead.
- One Indian soldier was killed while escorting a de-mining team near Magwe on 27 January 2007.
- An unidentified soldier was killed in an ambush in the Kassab refugee camp on 1 February 2007.
- A Rwandan soldier died of malaria on 15 February 2007.
- Two Nigerian soldiers were killed in an ambush in Graida on 6 March 2007.
- Five Senegalese soldiers were killed while guarding a watering point near Chad.
- One Rwandan soldier was killed in an ambush in Sortoni on 10 April 2007.
- One Ghanaian soldier was killed in an ambush in Nyala on 15 April 2007.
- An Egyptian soldier was killed after robbers broke into a house near al-Fasher 26 May 2007.
- Seven Nigerians, one Malian, one Senegalese and one Botswana soldier were killed when their base was overrun by 1,000 rebels in Haskanita on 30 September 2007.

== Evaluation and lessons learned ==
Guicherd, Catherine. The AU in Sudan: Lessons for the African Standby Force, New York, International Peace Academy, 2007
