= United Nations Mission in Sudan =

Peacekeeping mission of United Nations in Sudan

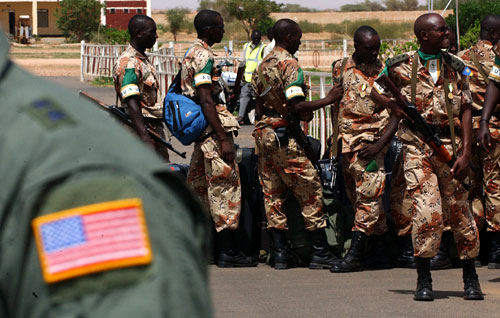
- Rwandan UNMIS troops prepare to board a C-130 at El Fasher, Sudan
- Abbreviation: UNMIS
- Formation: 24 March 2005
- Type: Peacekeeping Mission
- Legal status: Accomplished
- Headquarters: Khartoum, Sudan
- Head: Haile Menkerios
- Parent organization: United Nations Security Council
- Website: un.org/unmis

The United Nations Mission in the Sudan (UNMIS) was established by the UN Security Council under Resolution 1590 of 24 March 2005, in response to the signing of the Comprehensive Peace Agreement between the government of the Sudan and the Sudan People's Liberation Movement on 9 January 2005.

UNMIS tasks are to support the implementation of the Comprehensive Peace Agreement, to perform certain functions relating to humanitarian assistance, protection, promotion of human rights, and to support the African Union Mission in Sudan. The mandate of UNMIS ended on 9 July 2011; the UNSC officially ended the mission on 11 July 2011, with a drawdown by 31 August 2011. Equipment and personnel will be transferred to UNISFA and UNMISS.

Its best-known employee was journalist Lubna al-Hussein, who resigned in order to waive her immunity.

== Statistics ==
According to the UN Facts and Figures: Khartoum, Sudan

- Duration: March 2005 to July 2011
- Special Representative of the Secretary-General and Head of Mission: Haile Menkerios.
- Principal Deputy Special Representative of the Secretary-General (Political): Jasbir Singh Lidder
- Deputy Special Representative of the Secretary-General (Resident and Humanitarian Coordinator): Georg Charpentier
- Force Commander: Moses Bisong Obi (Nigeria)
- Police Commissioner: vacant

== Strength ==
Up to 10,000 military personnel including some 750 military observers; as well as 715 civilian police, 1,018 international civilian staff, 2,623 national staff and 214 UN Volunteers. There is a small African Union force on the ground that will in time be incorporated into the U.N. force. Troops will be located in 6 different Sectors, with military observers in charge of observing the ceasefire. Force protection will be provided by various contributing countries.

Sectors are divided as such:

- Sector 2: Bahr el Ghazal; Sector Headquarters Wau; Troop Contributing Countries Kenya and China. This sector include the states of Western Bahr el Ghazal, Northern Bahr el Ghazal, Warab and Al Buhairat.
- Sector 3: Upper White Nile; Sector Headquarters Malakal; Troop Contributing Country India. This sector includes the states of Jonglei, Unity and Upper Nile.
- Sector 4: Nuba Mountains; Sector Headquarters Kadugli; Troop Contributing Country Egypt. This sector has the same boundaries as the former Southern Kordofan Province when Greater Kordofan was sub-divided into two provinces.
- Sector 5: Southern Blue Nile; Sector Headquarters Damazin; Troop Contributing Country Pakistan. This sector consists of Blue Nile State.
- Sector 6: Abyei; Sector Headquarters Abyei; Troop Contributing Country Zambia. This sector includes the disputed oil region surrounding and extending north from the town of Abyei.

=== Contributors of military personnel ===
Algeria, Australia, Austria, Bangladesh, Botswana, Brazil, Cambodia, Canada, China, Colombia, Croatia, Denmark, Djibouti, Ecuador, Egypt, Fiji, Finland, Germany, Greece, Guatemala, Hungary, India, Indonesia, Italy, Japan, Mongolia Jordan, Kenya, Malawi, Namibia, Nepal, Netherlands, New Zealand, Nigeria, Norway, Oman, Pakistan, Paraguay, Peru, Poland, Romania, Russia, Rwanda, South Africa, South Korea, Spain, Sweden, Thailand, Togo, United Kingdom, United States, Ukraine, Uruguay, Vietnam, Yemen, Zambia, Zimbabwe

=== Contributors of police personnel ===
Argentina, Australia, Bangladesh, Bhutan, Brazil, Bosnia and Herzegovina, Canada, China, Denmark, Egypt, Fiji, Gambia, Germany, Ghana, India, Indonesia, Jordan, Kenya, Malaysia, Mexico, Nepal, Netherlands, New Zealand, Nigeria, Norway, Pakistan, Philippines, Russia, Samoa, South Korea, Sri Lanka, Sweden, Tanzania, Turkey, Uganda, United Kingdom, United States, Ukraine, Zambia, Zimbabwe

== Current situation ==
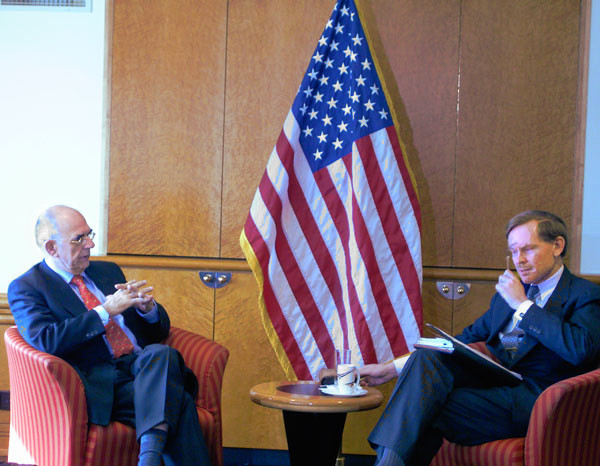
Robert Zoellick, U.S. Deputy Secretary of State (right) with Jan Pronk, the United Nations' special representative to Sudan during Donors Conference for Sudan held in Oslo on April 12, 2005.

The Ceasefire Agreement comes into effect on the date of signature of the Comprehensive Peace Agreement (CPA). Not all belligerent groups have been party to the peace negotiations and many have proclaimed their displeasure that they have not been directly involved or their interests taken into account and stated they will not automatically feel bound by the CPA as negotiated by government of Sudan and SPLM/A. There is also an increase of well armed criminal elements that could see the UN as a lucrative target, including groups operating cross border such as the Lord’s Resistance Army.

The strategic end state is determined as: a. A stable Sudan capable of conducting a peaceful referendum 61/2 years after the Mandate in South Sudan and Abyei. b. The ability for South Sudan to determine Sudanese unity or peaceful secession. c. The ability for Abyei to determine unification with Bar el Gazhal or separate status within North Sudan. d. Provision for a stable environment in Southern Kordofan/Nuba Mountains and Blue Nile State to allow the peoples of those States through consultation come to an agreement that will be the final settlement of the political conflict in their State.

Brigadier Moinuddin Ahmed of the Pakistan Army, who was Deputy Force Commander of the United Nations peace-keeping mission in Sudan, was assassinated on 22 October 2009, during his visit to Pakistan.

== Financial aspects ==
=== Method of financing ===
Approved budget for the one-year period between July 1, 2006, to June 30, 2007 (Resolution 60/122 B): $1,079,530,000.

== See also ==
- United Nations Integrated Transition Assistance Mission in Sudan
- United Nations–African Union Mission in Darfur
- United Nations Interim Security Force for Abyei
