= United Nations–African Union Mission in Darfur =

Peacekeeping mission in Darfur

African Union-United Nations Hybrid operation in Darfur
- Abbreviation: UNAMID
- Formation: 31 July 2007; 19 years ago
- Dissolved: 31 December 2020; 5 years ago
- Type: Peacekeeping mission
- Legal status: Inactive
- Headquarters: El Fasher, Sudan
- Head: Joint Special Representative; Jeremiah Kingsley Mamabolo
- Parent organization: United Nations Security Council; African Union
- Website: unamid.unmissions.org

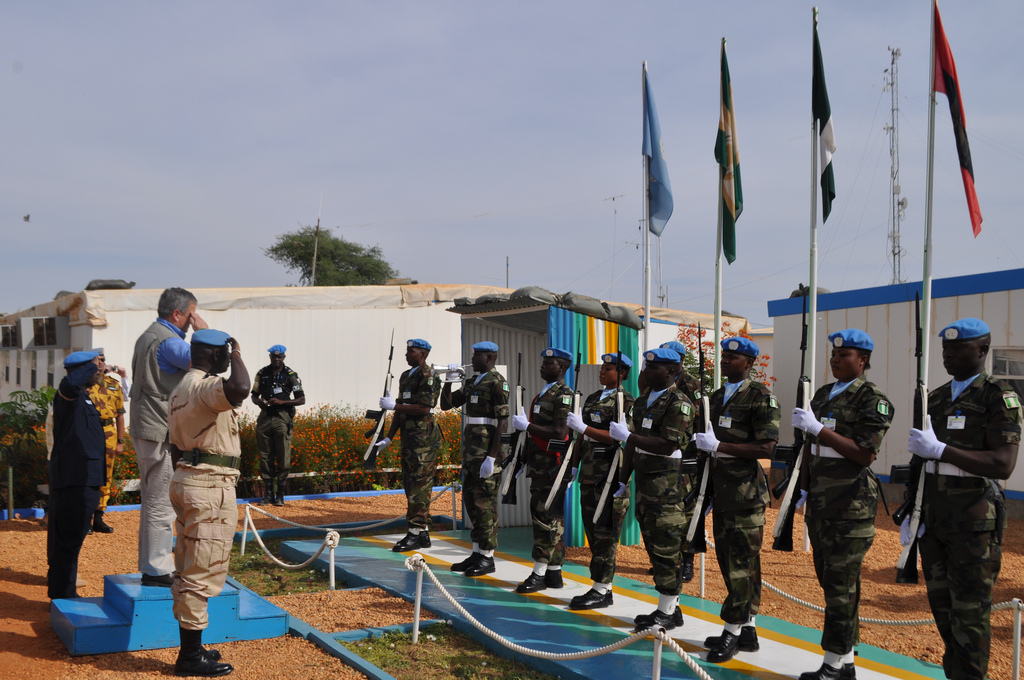
A UNAMID Honor Guard greets SE Gration's arrival into the UNAMID compound in El Geneina, West Darfur, 19 November 2009.

The African Union-United Nations Hybrid Operation in Darfur (known by its acronym UNAMID) was a joint African Union (AU) and United Nations (UN) peacekeeping mission formally approved by United Nations Security Council Resolution 1769 on 31 July 2007, to bring stability to the war-torn Darfur region of Sudan while peace talks on a final settlement continue.

Its initial 12-month mandate was extended to 31 July 2010. As of 2008, its budget was approximately US $106 million per month. Its force of about 26,000 personnel began to deploy to the region in October 2007. The 9,000-strong African Union Mission in Sudan (AMIS), which was previously responsible for peacekeeping, had completely merged into this new force by 31 December 2007.

The mandate is for a force of up to 19,555 military personnel and 3,772 police, along with a further "19 formed police units comprising up to 140 personnel each." The peacekeepers are allowed to use force to protect civilians and humanitarian operations. UNAMID is the first joint UN/AU force and the largest peacekeeping mission.

As of December 2008, it had deployed 15,136 total uniformed personnel, including 12,194 troops, 175 military observers, and 2,767 police officers, who were supported by 786 international civilian personnel, 1,405 local civilian staff, and 266 UN volunteers.

On 22 December 2020, the UN Security Council unanimously adopted Resolution 2559 (2020) to end the UNAMID mandate on 31 December 2020, with full withdrawal to be completed by 30 June 2021.

== Authorisation ==
Initial authorization for the mission was given by the UN Security Council in resolution 1769 of 31 July 2007. This resolution set the strength of the mission as "... up to 19,555 military personnel, including 360 military observers and liaison officers, and an appropriate civilian component including up to 3,772 police personnel and 19 formed police units comprising up to 140 personnel each". The mission's authorisation was extended in essentially unchanged form for each of the following five years: UN Security Council resolution 1828 adopted on 31 July 2008, resolution 1881 on 30 July 2009, resolution 1935 on 30 July 2010, resolution 2003 on 29 July 2011, and resolution 2063 adopted on 31 July 2012.

Security Council resolution 2113 of 30 July 2013 extended the mandate of UNAMID for 13 months – to 31 August 2014 – but reduced the permitted force strength to 16,200 military personnel, 2,310 police personnel and 17 formed police units of up to 140 personnel. The following year saw the mandate extended once again to 30 June 2015 (Security Council resolution 2173 of 27 August 2014).

Security Council resolution 2228 of 29 June 2015 further reduced the force strength, to no more than 15,845 military personnel, 1,583 police personnel and 13 formed police units of up to 140 personnel each. This force authorisation was extended by another 12 months through Security Council resolution 2296 of 29 June 2016.

== Withdrawal ==
The Trump government of the United States argued for a reduction in UN peacekeeping budgets during the first half of 2017. Possibly arising from this, when the UNAMID mandate was renewed for a further 12 months by the UN Security Council on 29 June 2017, significant reductions in deployed personnel were announced. The approved Force strength was to be reduced in two stages. By the end of 2017 the authorized numbers of troops and police would be 11,395 and 2,888, respectively. To be further reduced by mid-2018 to 8,735 troops (eight battalions) and 2,500 police. Reductions in Mission civilian staff were planned to be 426 in Phase 1 (i.e. to 31 December 2017) and a further 147 positions lost in Phase 2 (i.e. to 30 June 2018).

== Leadership and command ==
United Nations' missions come under a civilian Head of Mission, usually called the Special Representative of the UN Secretary General. UNAMID, as a joint mission, has a civilian head appointed by both the UN Secretary General and AU Commission Chairman. In October 2015 Martin Ihoeghian Uhomoibhi (of Nigeria) was appointed as Joint Special Representative for Darfur and Head of UNAMID, succeeding Abiodun Oluremi Bashua (also of Nigeria). On 3 April 2017 it was announced that Jeremiah Nyamane Kingsley Mamabolo of South Africa had been appointed as Joint Special Representative and Head of the African Union-United Nations Hybrid Operation in Darfur.

=== Force Commanders ===
No.	Name	Nationality	From	To	Notes
1	Gen. Martin Luther Agwai	Nigeria	1 January 2008	31 August 2009	
2	Lt. Gen. Patrick Nyamvumba	Rwanda	1 September 2009	31 March 2013	
3	Lt. Gen. Paul Ignace Mella	Tanzania	4 June 2013	31 December 2015	
4	Lt. Gen. Frank Mushyo Kamanzi	Rwanda	1 January 2016		On 6 April 2017 it was announced that General Kamanzi had been appointed Force Commander for UNMISS in South Sudan.
5	Maj. Gen. Fida Hussain Malik	Pakistan	Mid-2017		Acting in the role.
6	Lt. Gen. Leonard Muriuki Ngondi	Kenya	August 2017	incumbent	

=== Deputy Force Commanders ===
No.	Name	Nationality	From	To
1	Maj. Gen. Emmanuel Karenzi Karake	Rwanda	1 January 2008	April 2009
2	Maj. Gen. Duma Dumisani Mdutyana	South Africa	31 May 2009	
3	Maj. Gen. Wynjones Kisamba	Tanzania	September 2011	2013
4	Maj. Gen. Balla Keita	Senegal	2013	2015
5	Maj. Gen. Mohammad Maksudur Rahman	Bangladesh	October 2015	-
6	Maj. Gen. Fida Hussain Malik	Pakistan	May 2017	incumbent

== Structure ==
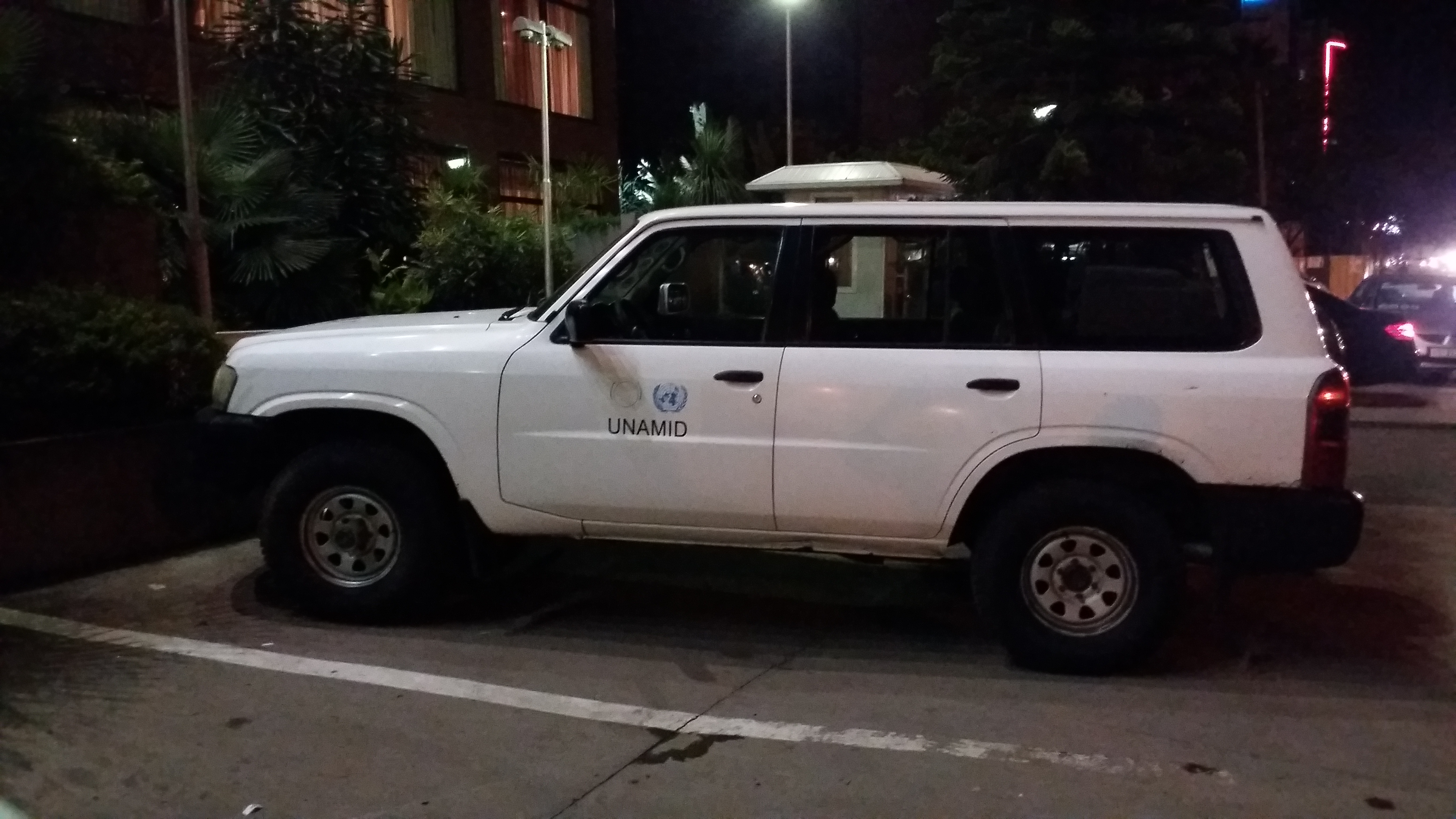
UNAMID vehicle in Addis Ababa, April 2017

The USAF's 786th Air Expeditionary Squadron helped arrange airlift into Darfur for the 55th Battalion of the Rwandan Army to join UNAMID in 2007.

=== Sectors ===
The preceding African Union Mission in Sudan (AMIS) was organised in a number of Sectors, each under the command of a Colonel. When UNAMID took over from AMIS some of these sectors were merged and Sectors became Brigadier's commands. Initially the Force was divided into three Sectors:

- Sector North (with headquarters at El Fasher)
- Sector West (El Geneina)
- Sector South (Nyala)

By mid-2015 a further two Sectors had been established:

- Sector Central (Zalingei)
- Sector East (Al Da’ ein)

=== Major units ===
A UNAMID map showing force deployment in December 2016 showed the force then comprised 14 infantry battalions (in addition to engineer, signals, medical and other support units). These battalions were deployed as follows (with changes to December 2017 noted, by when the Force was reduced to 11 battalions.):

Sector North

- El Fasher – Rwandan battalion (Rwanbatt 47 during 2016/17)
- Kabkabiya – Rwandan battalion (Rwanbatt 46 during 2016/17)
- Umm Barru – Senegalese battalion (reduced to two companies by December 2017)
- Kutum – Pakistani battalion (replaced by Senegalese by December 2017)
- Tawila – Ethiopian battalion

Sector West

- El Geneina – Indonesian battalion
- Forobaranga – Burkina Faso battalion (closed by December 2017, following departure of Burkina Faso contingent)

Sector Central

- Zalingei – Rwandan battalion (Rwanbatt 45 during 2016/17)
- Mukhjar – Ethiopian battalion

Sector South

- Nyala – Nigerian battalion (Nibatt 45 during 2016, replaced by Egyptian battalion by December 2017)
- Graida – Ethiopian battalion
- Edd al Fursan – Egyptian battalion (closed by December 2017)
- Khor Abeche – Tanzanian battalion
- Kass - Rwandan battalion

Sector East

- Al Da'ein – Pakistani battalion

=== Withdrawal ===
During mid-2017 UN Security Council authorisation of the Mission imposed personnel reductions. The approved Force strength was to be reduced in two phases: Phase 1 levels to be reached by 31 December 2017 and Phase 2 reductions by 30 June 2018. Along with reductions in personnel UNAMID was to close eleven bases during Phase 1. During September four 'team sites' were closed and handed over to Sudanese Government officials: Mellit, Malha and Um Kadada in North Darfur and Muhajeria in East Darfur. During October another seven bases were closed: Abu Shouk, Tine, Habila Eid, Al Fursan (12 October), Tulus (15 October), Forobaranga (17 October) and, finally, Zam Zam (21 October).

== Participants ==
On 12 August 2007, Alpha Oumar Konare, chairman of the AU, announced that UNAMID was likely to be an all-African peacekeeping force. As of 30 June 2013, the total number of personnel in the mission was 19,735:

Country	Police	Experts	Troops
Algeria	125	8	619
Bangladesh	764	16	196
Benin	1		
Bolivia		2	
Burkina Faso	184	12	808
Burundi	71	8	2
Brazil	4		
Cambodia		3	
Cameroon	14		
China			233
Colombia	2		2
Ivory Coast	6		
Djibouti	151		
Egypt	245	24	1,062
Ethiopia	26	16	2,549
Gambia	156		211
Germany	6	50	8
Ghana	158	8	12
Indonesia	156	4	1
Iran		2	16
Jamaica	12		
Japan	2		2
Jordan	531	13	12
Kenya		5	80
Kyrgyzstan	7	2	
Lesotho		2	1
Libya			14
Madagascar	9		
Malawi	59		
Malaysia	44	2	14
Mali		7	1
Mexico	4		
Mongolia			70
Namibia		10	3
Nepal	297	18	363
Nigeria	372	14	2,573
Oman	120	54	8
Pakistan	244	6	504
Peru		4	
Philippines	14	2	8
Rwanda	212	11	3,239
Senegal	300	19	795
Sierra Leone	95	10	11
South Africa		16	809
South Korea			2
Tajikistan	14		
Tanzania	208	21	894
Thailand		8	7
Togo	140	7	
Tonga	2		
Tunisia	67		
Turkey	79		
Vietnam	4		
Yemen	204	47	4
Zambia	63	12	5
Zimbabwe		6	2

=== Former contributors ===
- Burkina Faso During March 2017 the Government of Burkina Faso announced its intention to withdraw its 850 troops from UNAMID, citing the increasing threat presented by radical jihadists it faced at home.
- Canada
- Ireland
- Norway
- South Africa South Africa withdrew their troops from UNAMID from 1 April 2016 after nearly 12 years of deployments to Darfur. The first deployment of South African military observers to the African Union Mission in Sudan (AMIS) dating back to July 2004. A South African Government statement gave the reason for the recall of its troops as: "The Sudanese government made it increasingly difficult for us to provide logistic support to our troops, and impossible for our forces to protect the women and children of that country".

== Casualties ==
UNAMID deaths by nationality

Nigeria: 37
Rwanda: 30
Ethiopia: 26
Sudan: 25
Senegal: 16
Tanzania: 14
Burkina Faso: 13
Sierra Leone: 13
Egypt: 8
South Africa: 8
Gambia: 7
Bangladesh: 6
Jordan: 4
Nepal: 4
Uganda: 4
Zambia: 4
Ghana: 3
Kenya: 3
Barbados: 1
Fiji: 1
Liberia: 1
Malawi: 1
Malaysia: 1
Morocco: 1
Pakistan: 1
Russian Federation: 1
Thailand: 1
Togo: 1
Yemen: 1

TOTAL: 236

As of 30 June 2017, 236 UN personnel had died whilst serving with UNAMID.

=== Incidents ===
- A Ugandan peacekeeper was found shot dead in his car in the El Fasher region on 29 May 2008.
- On 8 July 2008, seven UN peacekeepers were killed and 22 injured in an attack by a militia. The attack was reported and condemned by the United Nations Security Council.
- A Nigerian peacekeeper was killed on 16 July 2008.
- A Nigerian peacekeeper was killed on 7 October 2008.
- A South African peacekeeper was killed on 29 October 2008.
- Two UNAMID peacekeepers were killed between November 2008 and February 2009.
- A Nigerian peacekeeper was killed in a firefight on 17 March 2009.
- A UNAMID peacekeeper was shot dead in front of his home in Nyala on 8 May 2009.
- A UNAMID peacekeeper was killed between June and August 2009.
- A Nigerian peacekeeper was killed in an ambush in Sudan's western Darfur region on 29 September 2009.
- Three Rwandan peacekeepers were killed and three wounded in an ambush by gunmen while escorting a water tanker on 4 December 2009.
- On 6 December 2009, two more Rwandan peacekeepers were killed and one was wounded when gunmen opened fire from a crowd as Rwandan troops were distributing water.
- Two Egyptian peacekeepers were killed and three wounded in an ambush near Edd al-Fursan in southern Darfur on 7 May 2010.
- One UNAMID peacekeeper was killed, and three others were critically wounded, in an attack on 21 January 2013 while they were patrolling in Darfur.
- One UNAMID peacekeeper was killed and two injured on 19 April 2013 in an attack on their base at Muhajeria in East Darfur.
- Seven Tanzanian peacekeepers were killed on 13 July 2013.

== See also ==
- African Union Mission in Sudan
- United Nations Mission in Sudan
- African Union Mission in Somalia
- African Union-led Regional Task Force
- United Nations Force Intervention Brigade
- United Nations Integrated Transition Assistance Mission in Sudan
