= United Nations Security Council Resolution 1713 =

UN Security Council Resolution 1713
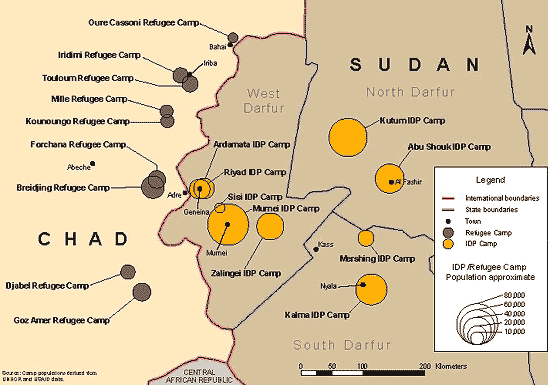
- Refugee camps at the border with Chad
- Date: 29 September 2006
- Meeting no.: 5,543
- Code: S/RES/1713 (Document)
- Subject: The situation concerning Sudan
- Voting summary: 15 voted for; None voted against; None abstained
- Result: Adopted

Security Council composition
- Permanent members: China; France; Russia; United Kingdom; United States
- Non-permanent members: Argentina; Rep. of the Congo; Denmark; Ghana; Greece; Japan; Peru; Qatar; Slovakia; Tanzania

United Nations Security Council Resolution 1713, adopted unanimously on September 29, 2006, after recalling previous resolutions on the situation in Sudan, particularly resolutions 1556 (2004), 1591 (2005), 1651 (2005) and 1665 (2006), the Council extended the mandate of an expert panel monitoring sanctions against and violations of human rights in the Darfur region until September 29, 2007, and requested the Secretary-General to add another expert to the team.

The resolution was drafted by the United States.

== Observations ==
The Security Council stressed its commitment to peace in Sudan, the implementation of the Comprehensive Peace Agreement and the end of the violations in the Darfur region. All parties that had not signed the Darfur Peace Agreement were urged to so immediately. It deplored ongoing violence, impunity and the deteriorating humanitarian situation in Darfur; all parties were called upon to end violence offensives.

The preamble of the resolution reiterated the need for respecting elements of the United Nations Charter, including those relating to the Convention on the Privileges and Immunities. Council members stated that the situation continued to constitute a threat to international peace and security in the region.

== Acts ==
The resolution, enacted under Chapter VII of the United Nations Charter, extended the expert panel established in Resolution 1591 and extended by Resolution 1651 until September 29, 2006, and requested the Secretary-General to appoint a fifth member to the panel in order for it to better carry out its mission. The panel was instructed to report on the implementation of the sanctions and observations on human rights in a mid-term briefing on March 29, 2007, and a final report 30 days before the end of its mandate. All relevant United Nations bodies, the African Union and others were urged to co-operate with the expert panel and the committee established in Resolution 1591.

== See also ==
- African Union Mission in Sudan
- African Union – United Nations Hybrid Operation in Darfur
- International response to the War in Darfur
- List of United Nations Security Council Resolutions 1701 to 1800 (2006–2008)
- Southern Sudan
- Timeline of the War in Darfur
- War in Darfur
