= United Nations Security Council Resolution 1672 =

UN Security Council Resolution 1672
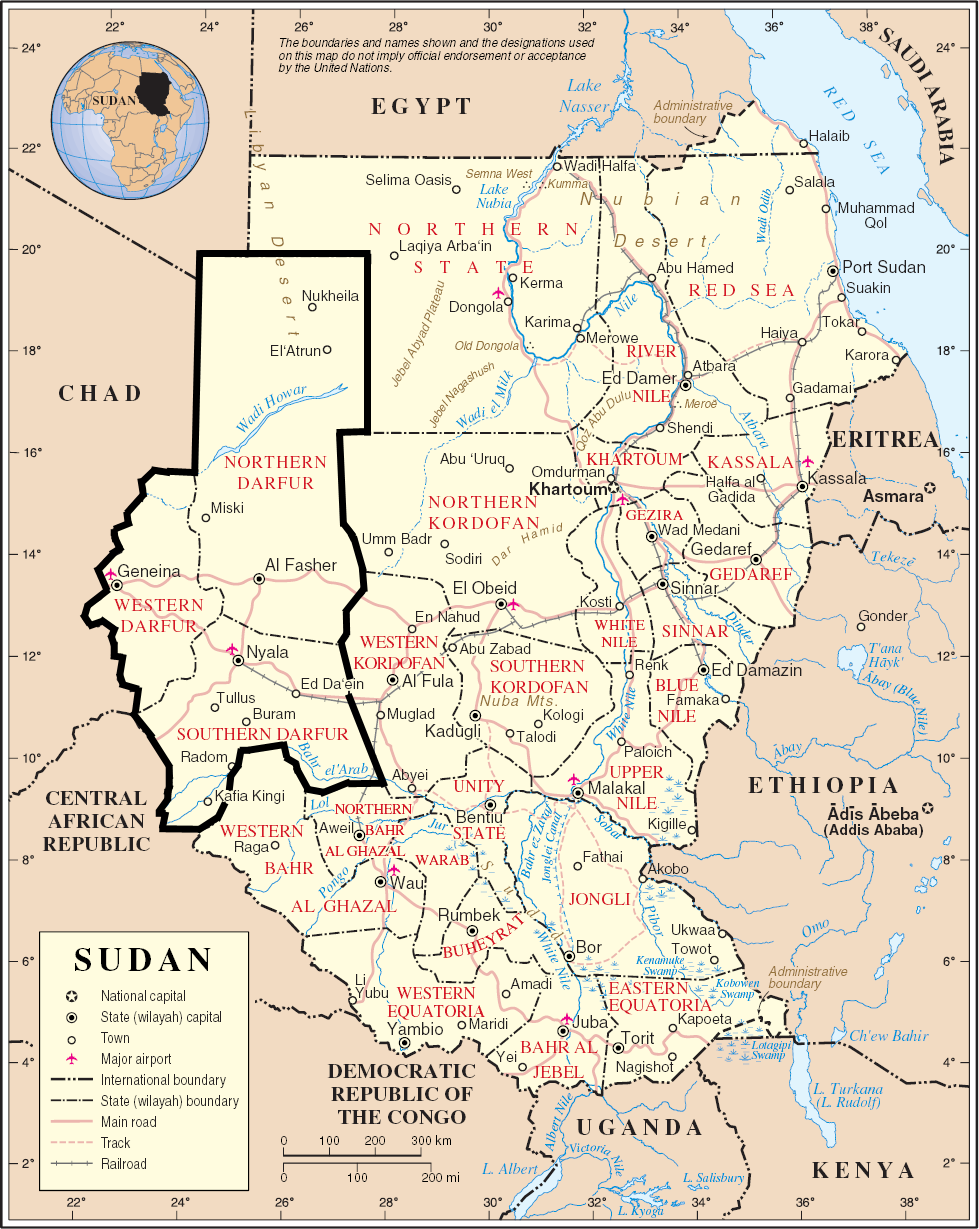
- Darfur region of Sudan (outlined)
- Date: 25 April 2006
- Meeting no.: 5,423
- Code: S/RES/1672 (Document)
- Subject: The situation concerning Sudan
- Voting summary: 12 voted for; None voted against; 3 abstained
- Result: Adopted

Security Council composition
- Permanent members: China; France; Russia; United Kingdom; United States
- Non-permanent members: Argentina; Rep. of the Congo; Denmark; Ghana; Greece; Japan; Peru; Qatar; Slovakia; Tanzania

United Nations Security Council Resolution 1672, adopted on April 25, 2006, after recalling resolutions 1556 (2004), 1591 (2005), 1651 (2005) and 1665 (2006) on the situation in Sudan, the Council imposed travel and financial sanctions on four Sudanese individuals over their involvement in the Darfur conflict. It was the first time sanctions had been adopted against individuals in the region.

The measures, imposed under Chapter VII of the United Nations Charter, were placed on Sheikh Musa Hillal, a leader of the Sudanese government backed Janjaweed militia in Darfur, and Major General Mohamed Elhassen, commander of Sudan's western military region. Sanctions were also placed on two rebel commanders: Gabriel Abdul Kareen Badri of the National Movement for Reform and Development, and Adam Yacub Shant, head of the Sudan Liberation Movement/Army.

At the same time, the Security Council stressed its commitment to peace in Darfur, the end of violence and the implementation of the Comprehensive Peace Agreement.

Resolution 1672 was adopted by 12 votes in favour to none against and three abstentions from China, Qatar and Russia. All three had reservations about the application of sanctions to the individuals concerned.

== See also ==
- African Union Mission in Sudan
- African Union – United Nations Hybrid Operation in Darfur
- International response to the War in Darfur
- List of United Nations Security Council Resolutions 1601 to 1700 (2005–2006)
- Southern Sudan
- Timeline of the War in Darfur
- War in Darfur
