= United Nations Security Council Resolution 1588 =

UN Security Council Resolution 1588
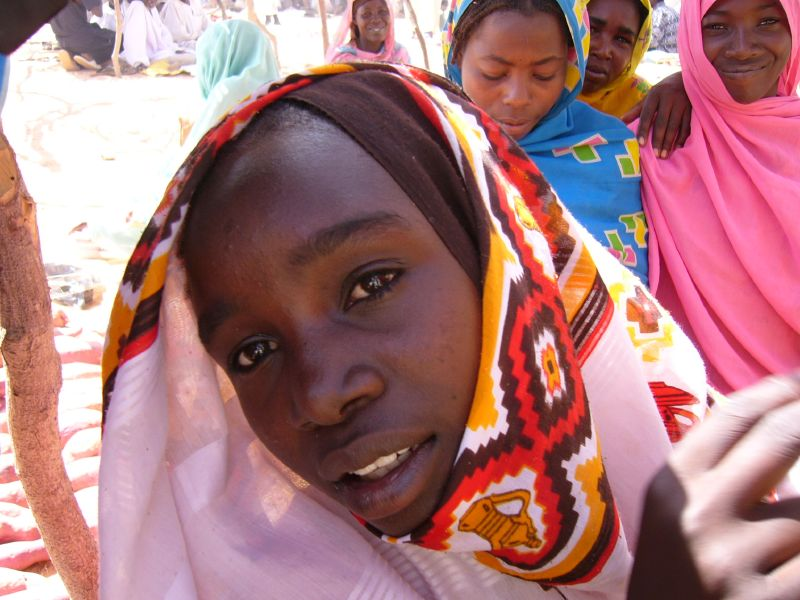
- Darfur refugees at a camp in eastern Chad
- Date: 17 March 2005
- Meeting no.: 5,143
- Code: S/RES/1588 (Document)
- Subject: The situation concerning Sudan
- Voting summary: 15 voted for; None voted against; None abstained
- Result: Adopted

Security Council composition
- Permanent members: China; France; Russia; United Kingdom; United States
- Non-permanent members: Algeria; Argentina; Benin; Brazil; Denmark; Greece; Japan; Philippines; Romania; Tanzania

United Nations Security Council Resolution 1588, adopted unanimously on 17 March 2005, after recalling resolutions 1547 (2004), 1556 (2004), 1574 (2004) and 1585 (2005) on the situation in Sudan, the Council extended the mandate of the United Nations Advance Mission in Sudan (UNAMIS) for a period of one week.

The mandate was extended until 24 March 2005, to allow for further discussions by the Security Council on the issue. It was designed to prepare for the establishment of a peacekeeping operation in the region. Within a week, the United Nations Mission in Sudan would be established.

== See also ==
- African Union Mission in Sudan
- United Nations–African Union Mission in Darfur
- International response to the War in Darfur
- List of United Nations Security Council Resolutions 1501 to 1600 (2003–2005)
- United Nations Mission in Sudan
- War in Darfur
