= United Nations Security Council Resolution 1665 =

UN Security Council Resolution 1665
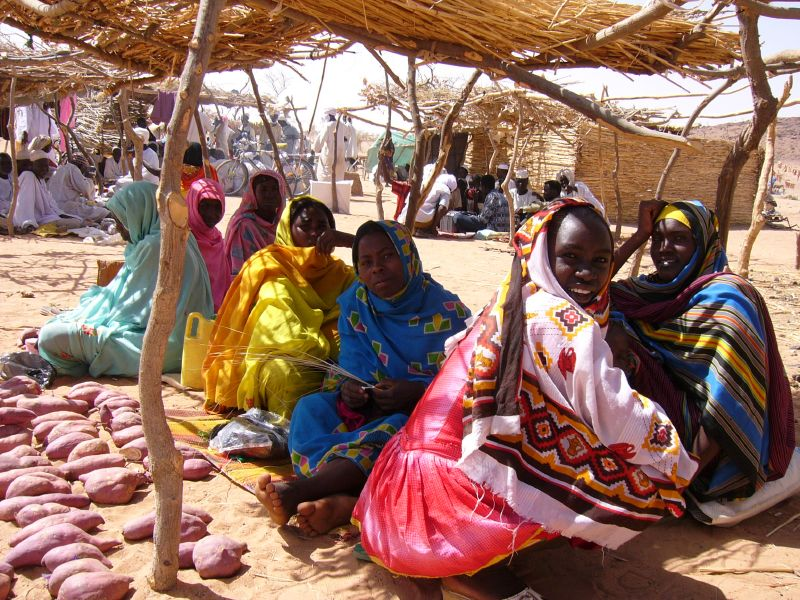
- Darfur refugees in Chad
- Date: 29 March 2006
- Meeting no.: 5,402
- Code: S/RES/1665 (Document)
- Subject: The situation concerning Sudan
- Voting summary: 15 voted for; None voted against; None abstained
- Result: Adopted

Security Council composition
- Permanent members: China; France; Russia; United Kingdom; United States
- Non-permanent members: Argentina; Rep. of the Congo; Denmark; Ghana; Greece; Japan; Peru; Qatar; Slovakia; Tanzania

United Nations Security Council Resolution 1665, adopted unanimously on March 29, 2006, after recalling previous resolutions on the situation in Sudan, particularly resolutions 1556 (2004), 1591 (2005) and 1651 (2005), extended the mandate of an expert panel monitoring sanctions against and violations of human rights in the Darfur region until September 29, 2006.

== Observations ==
The Security Council stressed its commitment to peace in Sudan, the implementation of the Comprehensive Peace Agreement and the end of the violations in the Darfur region. It emphasised the need for respecting elements of the United Nations Charter, including those relating to the Convention on the Privileges and Immunities. Council members stated that the situation continued to constitute a threat to international peace and security in the region.

== Acts ==
The resolution, enacted under Chapter VII of the United Nations Charter, extended the expert panel established in Resolution 1591 and extended by Resolution 1651 until September 29, 2006 and requested it to report on the implementation of the sanctions and observations on human rights. All relevant United Nations bodies, the African Union and others were urged to co-operate with the expert panel and the Committee established in Resolution 1591.

== See also ==
- African Union Mission in Sudan
- African Union – United Nations Hybrid Operation in Darfur
- International response to the War in Darfur
- List of United Nations Security Council Resolutions 1601 to 1700 (2005–2006)
- Southern Sudan
- Timeline of the War in Darfur
- War in Darfur
