= Kazakhstani passport =

Passport issued to citizens of the Republic of Kazakhstan

Kazakh passport
- The cover of a contemporary Kazakhstan biometric passport.
- Type: Passport
- Issued by: (Kazakhstan) Kazakh Ministry of Internal Affairs
- First issued: 1991
- Purpose: Identification
- Eligibility: Kazakh citizenship
- Expiration: 10 years

Kazakh passports (Kazakh: қазақстан төлқұжаты, romanized: qazaqstan tölqujatı) are issued to citizens of the Republic of Kazakhstan to facilitate international travel. Within the Republic of Kazakhstan citizens are required to use internal Kazakh identity card which can also be used for travel to the Russian Federation, Kyrgyzstan and Albania. The Kazakh Ministry of Justice started issuing biometric passports on 5 January 2009.

== Physical appearance ==
Kazakh passports have a cerulean colour cover with the words “ПАСПОРТ” (Kazakh) and “PASSPORT” (English) at the bottom, with the Republic of Kazakhstan's coat of arms in the middle of the front cover. Passports contain 36 pages, including 30 visa pages, the data/information page and observations page. The first page contains an inscription in two languages as follows:

Паспорт Қазақстан Республикасының меншiгi болып табылады, ал оның иесi Қазақстан Республикасының қорғауында болады – in Kazakh

This passport is the property of the Republic of Kazakhstan and its owner is under protection of the Republic of Kazakhstan – in English

== History ==
When Kazakhstan was within the USSR, Soviet passports were issued.

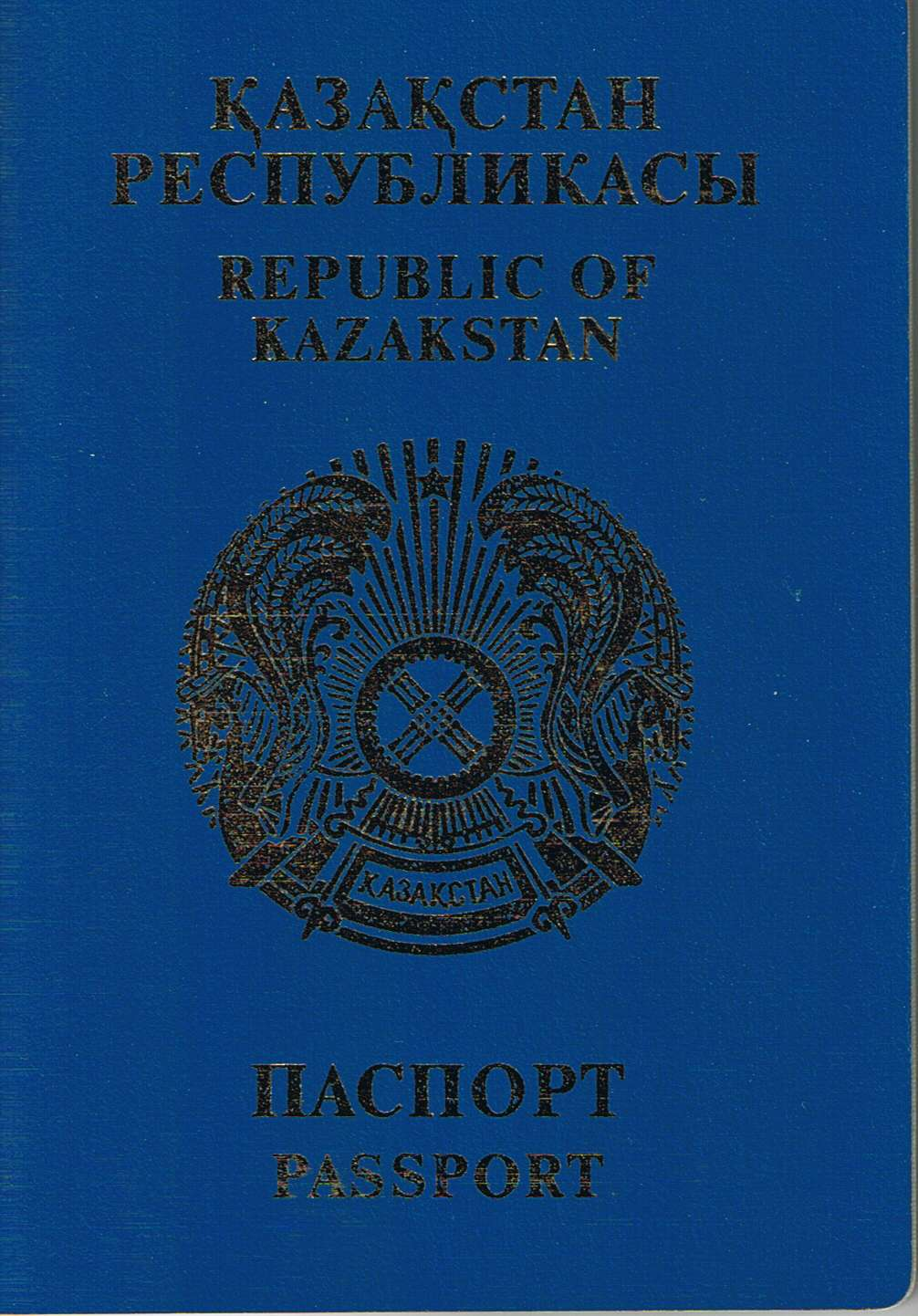
Old (non-biometric) passport cover.

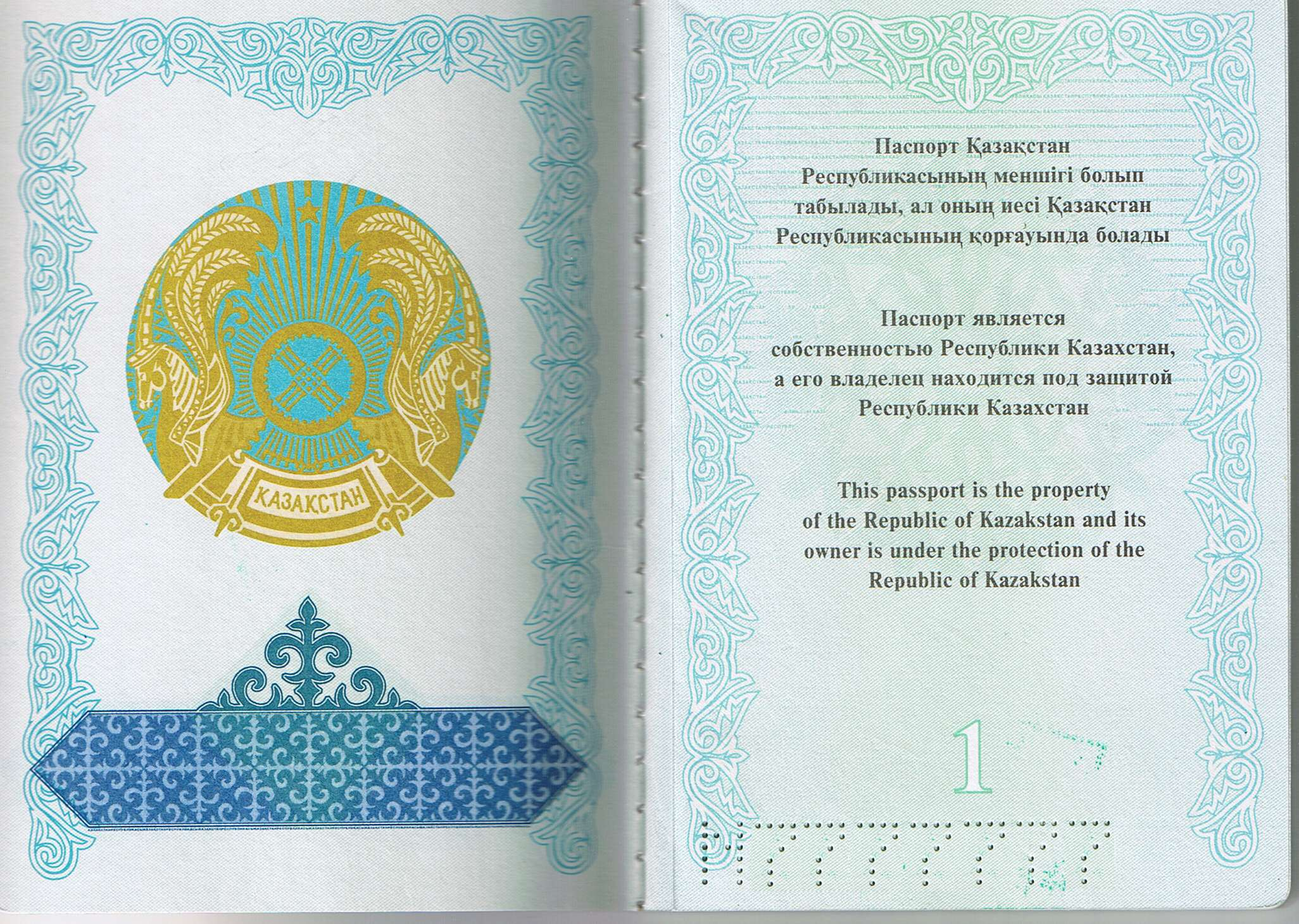
Old (non-biometric) passport's page number 1.

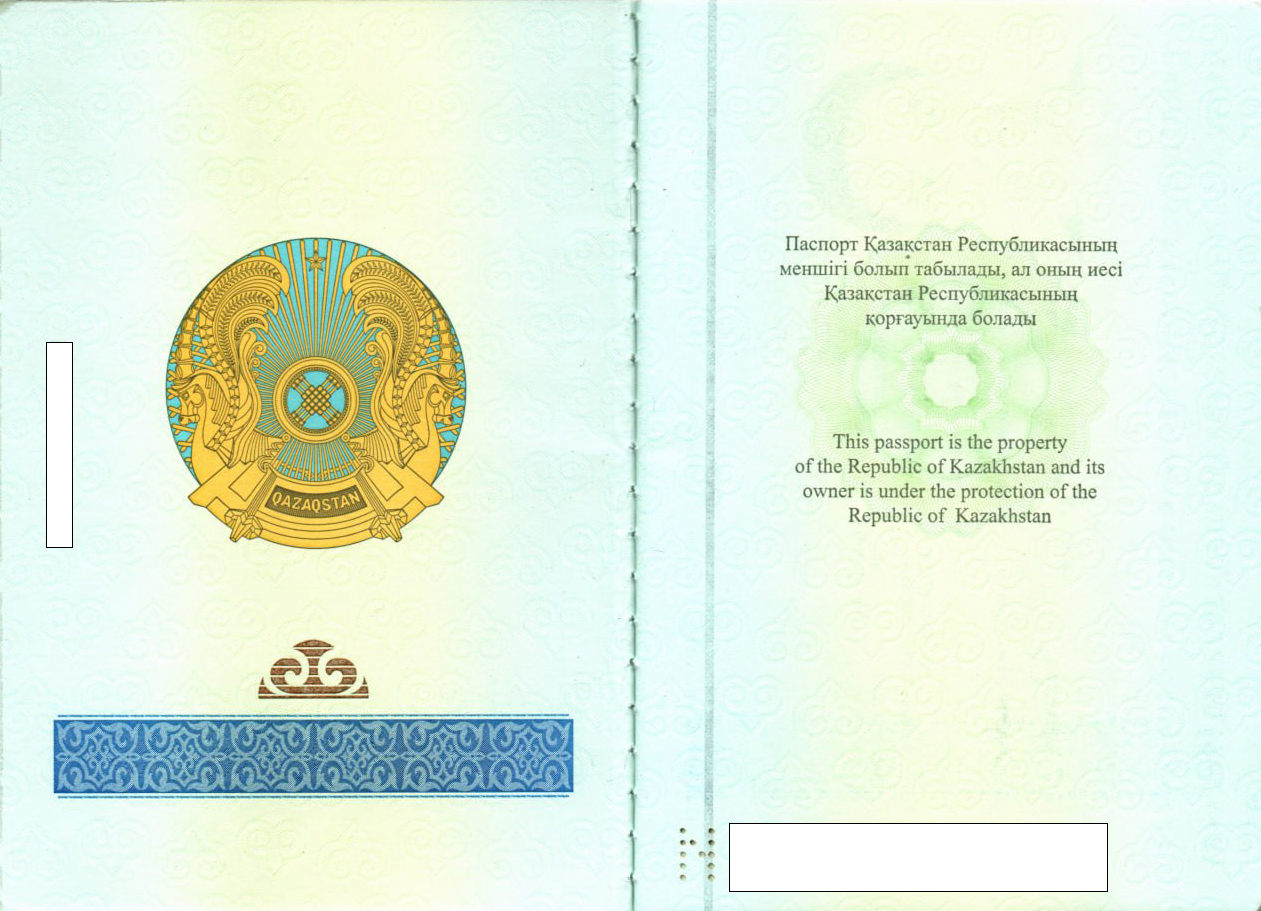
New (biometric) passport's page number 1.

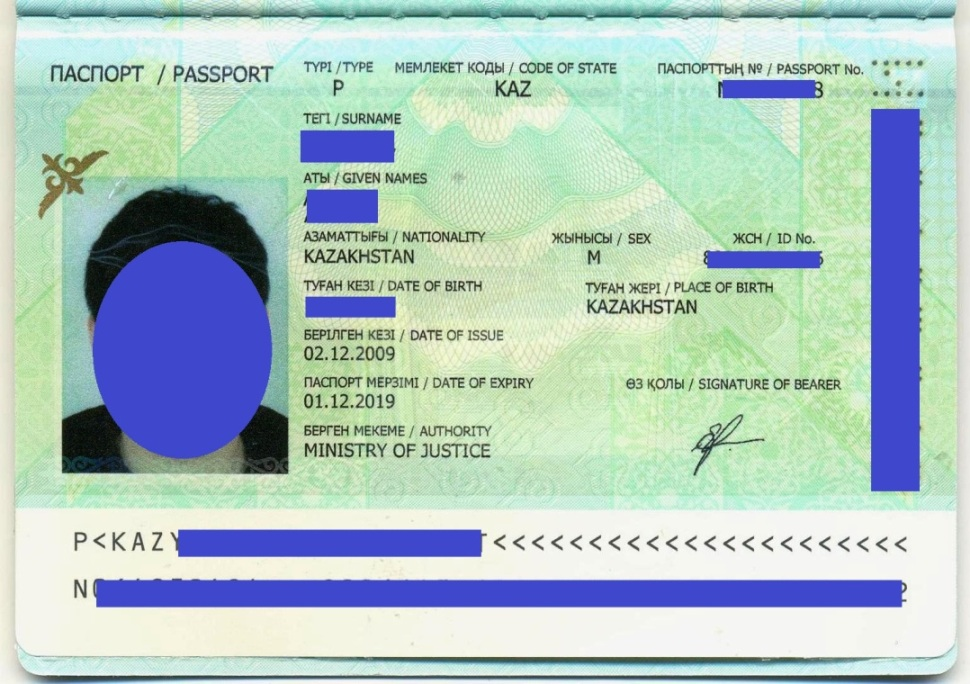
New (biometric) passport's data page.

=== Identity Information Page ===
A Kazakhstani Passport includes the following data:

- Photo of the passport bearer
- Type
- Code of State (KAZ)
- Passport No.
- Surname
- Given Names
- Nationality
- Sex
- ID No.
- Date of Birth
- Place of birth
- Date of Issue
- Date of Expiry
- Issuing Authority
- Signature of Bearer

The information page ends with a machine-readable zone.

=== Languages ===
The data page/information page is printed in Kazakh and English.

New biometric passports contain information in Kazakh and English only.

== Visa requirements ==
Visa requirements for holders of regular Kazakhstani passports Kazakhstan Visa-free access Visa on arrival eVisa Visa available both on arrival or online Visa required

As of 2024, Kazakhstani citizens had visa-free or visa on arrival access to 79 countries and territories, ranking the Kazakhstani passport 63rd in the world according to the Henley Passport Index.

== See also ==
- Kazakh identity card
- Visa requirements for Kazakhstani citizens
- Visa policy of Kazakhstan
