= United Nations Security Council Resolution 1591 =

UN Security Council Resolution 1591
- Darfur region of Sudan
- Date: 29 March 2005
- Meeting no.: 5,153
- Code: S/RES/1591 (Document)
- Subject: The situation concerning Sudan
- Voting summary: 12 voted for; None voted against; 3 abstained
- Result: Adopted

Security Council composition
- Permanent members: China; France; Russia; United Kingdom; United States
- Non-permanent members: Algeria; Argentina; Benin; Brazil; Denmark; Greece; Japan; Philippines; Romania; Tanzania

United Nations Security Council resolution 1591, adopted on 29 March 2005, after recalling resolutions 1547 (2004), 1556 (2004), 1564 (2004), 1574 (2004), 1585 (2005), 1588 (2005) and 1590 (2005) on the situation in Sudan, the council placed a travel ban and asset freeze on those "impeding the peace process" in Darfur.

The resolution was adopted by 12 votes in favour to none against and three abstentions from Algeria, China and Russia, who all expressed objections to the use of international sanctions and believed that the resolution failed to recognise the progress made by the Sudanese government.

== Observations ==
In the preamble of the resolution, the council welcomed of the Comprehensive Peace Agreement in Nairobi, Kenya, by the Sudanese government and Sudan People's Liberation Army/Movement (SPLA/M). It recognised that the parties to the agreement had to bring about peace and prevent further violations of human rights and of the ceasefire in Darfur. The security council was also concerned about the humanitarian situation and the safety of aid workers, and called on all parties to co-operate with the African Union Mission in Darfur.

== UN Panel of experts concerning Sudan ==
The United Nations Panel of experts concerning the Sudan was established by the UN Security Council Resolution 1591 March 2005. Its mandate is to among others monitor the Arms Embargo on Darfur. Their reports can be found at the following link:. Mr. Thomas W. Bifwoli was coordinator of the panel from 5 December 2007 until 15 October 2008. Mr Bifwoli had been originally appointed by the UN secretary General Kofi Annan in May 2006 to serve on the UN Panel of Experts as the Customs and Border control expert.

== Acts ==
Acting under Chapter VII of the United Nations Charter, the security council deplored the actions of the Sudanese government, rebel and other armed groups in Darfur for failing in their commitments to the council and continuing ceasefire violations. There were airstrikes by the government, which had also not disarmed the Janjaweed militia. In this regard, the council established a Committee to oversee the implementation of Security Council demands against the parties involved in the conflict, and investigate individuals responsible for human rights violations. It was instructed to report regularly to the council on the situation.

The resolution placed restrictions on those "impeding the peace process" in Darfur, including a travel ban and asset freeze, to enter into force within 30 days unless the parties complied with the security council. The council concluded by reiterating that further measures would be taken in the event of non-compliance by any of the parties.

== Application ==
In November 2024, Abdel Rahman Juma Barkalla and Osman Mohamed Hamid Mohamed were subjected to a travel ban and asset freeze imposed under the sanctions regime established under the Resolution. They were the first individuals sanctioned under the resolution since 2006. Further additions were made on 24 February 2026, when Abdul Rahim Dagalo, Gedo Hamdan Ahmed, Al-Fateh Abdullah Idris and Tijani Ibrahim Moussa Mohamed were added to the list of sanctioned individuals.

== See also ==
- African Union Mission in Sudan
- African Union – United Nations Hybrid Operation in Darfur
- International response to the War in Darfur
- List of United Nations Security Council Resolutions 1501 to 1600 (2003–2005)
- Timeline of the War in Darfur
- United Nations Mission in Sudan
- War in Darfur
