= New York Convention =

New York Convention may refer to several treaties signed in New York City:

- Convention on the Privileges and Immunities of the United Nations (1946)
- Convention for the Suppression of the Traffic in Persons and of the Exploitation of the Prostitution of Others (1950)
- Convention on the Recognition and Enforcement of Foreign Arbitral Awards (1958)
