= UNLP =

UNLP may refer to:

- National University of La Plata (Universidad Nacional de La Plata) in Argentina
- United Nations laissez-passer, a diplomatic travel document
