= United Nations Security Council Resolution 1585 =

UN Security Council Resolution 1585
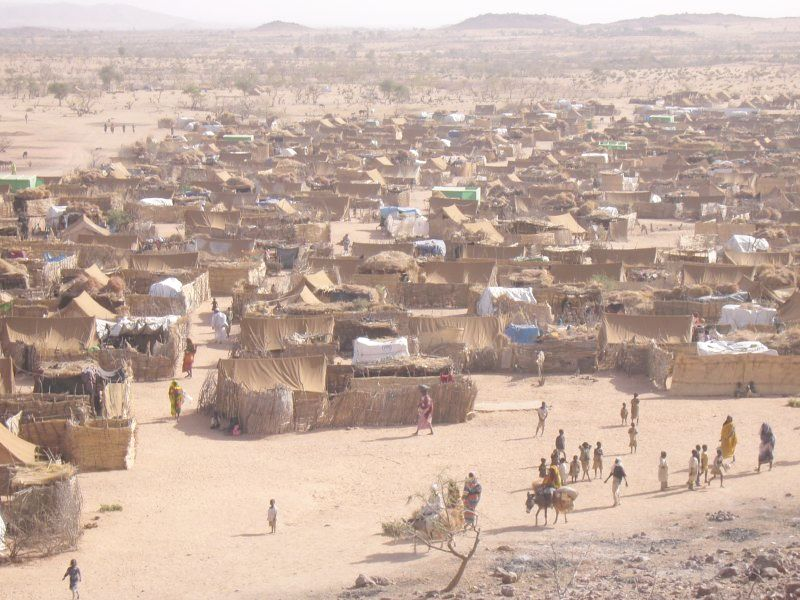
- A Darfur refugee camp in eastern Chad
- Date: 10 March 2005
- Meeting no.: 5,137
- Code: S/RES/1585 (Document)
- Subject: The situation concerning Sudan
- Voting summary: 15 voted for; None voted against; None abstained
- Result: Adopted

Security Council composition
- Permanent members: China; France; Russia; United Kingdom; United States
- Non-permanent members: Algeria; Argentina; Benin; Brazil; Denmark; Greece; Japan; Philippines; Romania; Tanzania

United Nations Security Council Resolution 1585, adopted unanimously on 10 March 2005, after recalling resolutions 1547 (2004), 1556 (2004) and 1574 (2004) on the situation in Sudan, the Council extended the mandate of the United Nations Advance Mission in Sudan (UNAMIS) for a period of one week.

The mandate was extended until 17 March 2005, to allow for further discussions by the Security Council on the issue. Within two weeks, the United Nations Mission in Sudan would be established.

== See also ==
- African Union Mission in Sudan
- United Nations–African Union Mission in Darfur
- International response to the War in Darfur
- List of United Nations Security Council Resolutions 1501 to 1600 (2003–2005)
- Southern Sudan
- United Nations Mission in Sudan
- War in Darfur
