= United Nations Security Council Resolution 2138 =

UN Security Council Resolution 2138
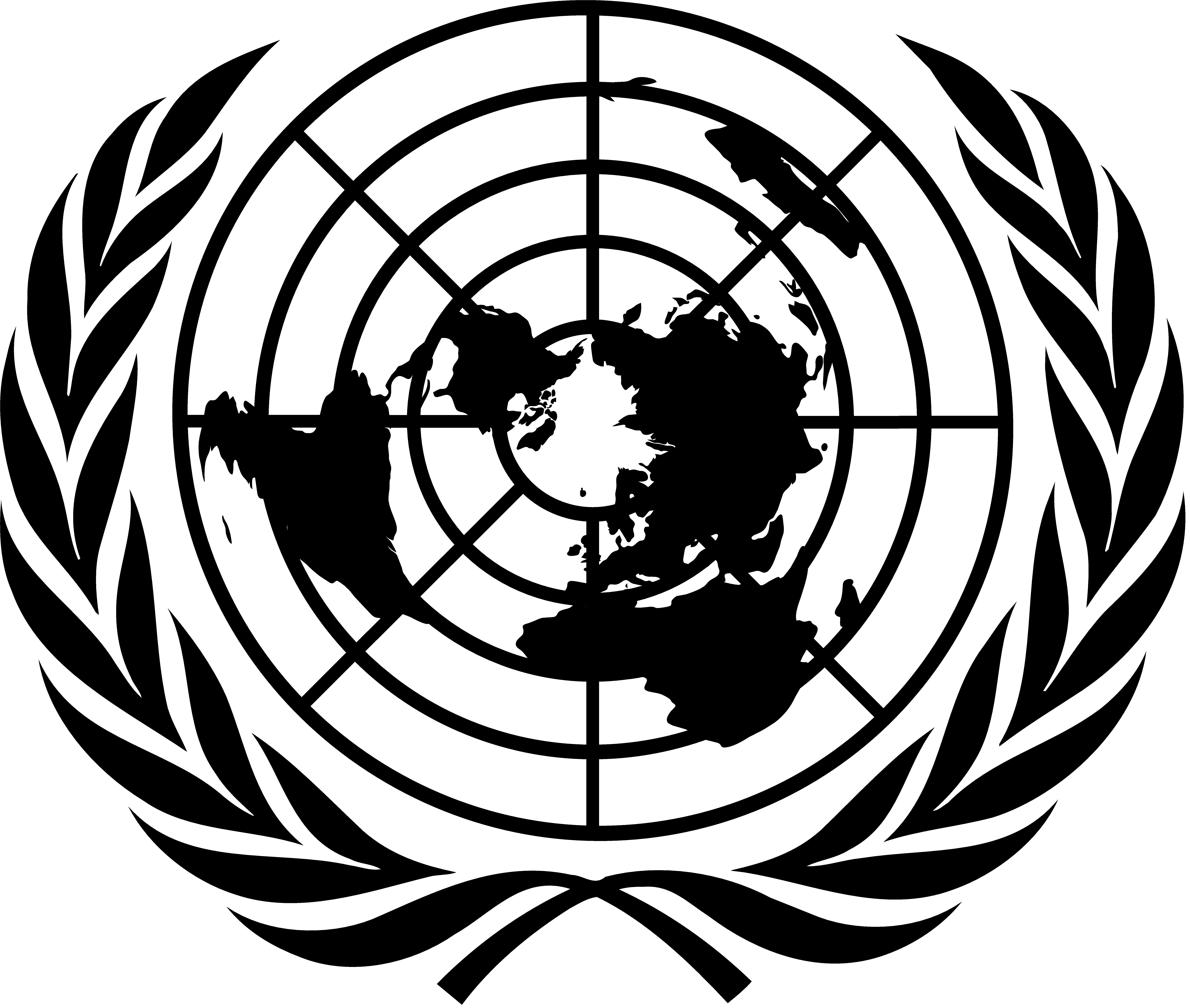
- UN emblem
- Date: 13 February 2014
- Meeting no.: 7111
- Code: S/RES/2138 (Document)
- Voting summary: 15 voted for; None voted against; None abstained
- Result: Adopted

Security Council composition
- Permanent members: China; France; Russia; United Kingdom; United States
- Non-permanent members: Argentina; Australia; Chad; Chile; Jordan; South Korea; Lithuania; Luxembourg; Nigeria; Rwanda

United Nations Security Council Resolution 2138, adopted on 13 February 2014, extended the mandate of the Sudan Sanctions Committee and requesting the committee's panel of experts provide a final report on its findings by January 2015. It noted with regret that armed groups in Darfur persisted in committing violence against civilians, and described an intention to impose further targeted sanctions against those responsible.

The resolution was adopted unanimously under Chapter VII of the UN Charter. It expressed concern over the supply to Sudan of technical assistance and financial support that could be used to support the Sudanese military in violation of UN Security Council Resolutions 1556 and 1591, and called on Sudan to end the accumulation and misuse of small arms and light weapons in Darfur. Furthermore, the resolution instructed the Sanctions Committee to address violations of the sanctions regime, noting that some states were not in compliance with the travel bans and assets freezes prescribed by resolutions 1556 and 1591.
