= United Nations Security Council Resolution 1564 =

UN Security Council Resolution 1564
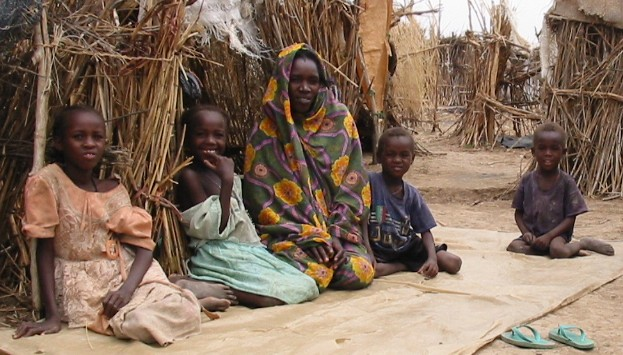
- Children in Darfur
- Date: 18 September 2004
- Meeting no.: 5,040
- Code: S/RES/1564 (Document)
- Subject: The situation concerning Sudan
- Voting summary: 11 voted for; None voted against; 4 abstained
- Result: Adopted

Security Council composition
- Permanent members: China; France; Russia; United Kingdom; United States
- Non-permanent members: Algeria; Angola; Benin; Brazil; Chile; Germany; Pakistan; Philippines; Romania; Spain

United Nations Security Council Resolution 1564, adopted on 18 September 2004, after recalling resolutions 1502 (2003), 1547 (2004) and 1556 (2004), the Council threatened the imposition of sanctions against Sudan if it failed to comply with its obligations on Darfur, and an international inquiry was established to investigate violations of human rights in the region.

The resolution, sponsored by Germany, Romania, the United Kingdom and United States, was adopted by 11 votes in favour to none against and four abstentions from Algeria, China, Pakistan and Russia. The abstaining countries expressed reservations about the threat of sanctions. It was the first time a Security Council resolution had invoked the Convention on the Prevention and Punishment of the Crime of Genocide by establishing the international inquiry.

== Resolution ==
=== Observations ===
Welcoming progress made towards humanitarian access, the Security Council expressed concern that the Sudanese government had not fulfilled its commitments under Resolution 1556. It praised the engagement of the African Union in addressing the situation in the Darfur region and the lifting of restrictions on the provision of humanitarian aid by the Sudanese government. The government and rebels were urged to allow the unimpeded delivery of humanitarian relief, including across Sudan's borders with Libya and Chad.

The preamble of the resolution expressed concern at the lack of progress towards the security and protection of civilians, disarming the Janjaweed and bringing those responsible for violations of human rights and international humanitarian law to justice. It recalled the primary responsibility of the Sudanese government to protect its civilians, respect human rights and maintain law and order. At the same time, the Justice and Equality Movement (JEM) and Sudan Liberation Movement/Army (SLM) also had to respect human rights.

It emphasised that the ultimate resolution to the crisis in Darfur was the return of refugees and internally displaced persons, with the Council expressing its determination to end the suffering of people in Darfur.

=== Acts ===
Acting under Chapter VII of the United Nations Charter, the Council declared that the government of Sudan had not met its commitments, expressing concern at helicopter attacks and assaults by the Janjaweed militia against villages in Darfur. It welcomed the intention of the African Union to enhance its monitoring mission in Darfur and urged all member states to support such efforts. All concerned parties were called upon to reach a political settlement under the auspicies of the African Union, with the government and Sudan People's Liberation Army/Movement (SPLM) urged to conclude a Comprehensive Peace Agreement. In particular, the government had to end impunity in Darfur and bring those responsible for widespread human rights abuses to justice. The names of those arrested for such abuses had to be submitted to the African Union.

The resolution demanded that all armed groups and rebel forces end the violence in the Darfur region, while the government was called upon to refrain from conducting military flights over the region in accordance with the April 8 Humanitarian Ceasefire Agreement. Meanwhile, the Secretary-General Kofi Annan was requested to establish an international commission of inquiry to investigate violations of human rights and humanitarian law in Darfur, including genocide, by all parties and to identify the perpetrators. Countries were called upon to provide generous contributions to humanitarian efforts underway in Darfur and Chad.

Finally, the Council warned that in the event of non-compliance of the Sudanese government with demands in Resolution 1556 or the current resolution, further measures would be imposed under Article 41 of the United Nations Charter, relating to restrictions against its petroleum sector and travel of government officials. The Secretary-General, in his reports on the situation, was required to report on the progress (or lack thereof) by the Sudanese government with Security Council demands and on efforts towards a peace agreement.

== See also ==
- African Union Mission in Sudan
- United Nations–African Union Mission in Darfur
- International response to the War in Darfur
- List of United Nations Security Council Resolutions 1501 to 1600 (2003–2005)
- United Nations Mission in Sudan
- War in Darfur
- United Nations Security Council Resolution 2138
