= Visa policy of Kazakhstan =

Policy on permits required to enter Kazakhstan

Visitors to Kazakhstan must obtain a visa from one of the Kazakhstan diplomatic missions unless they are citizens of one of the visa-exempt countries or citizens eligible for an e-Visa.

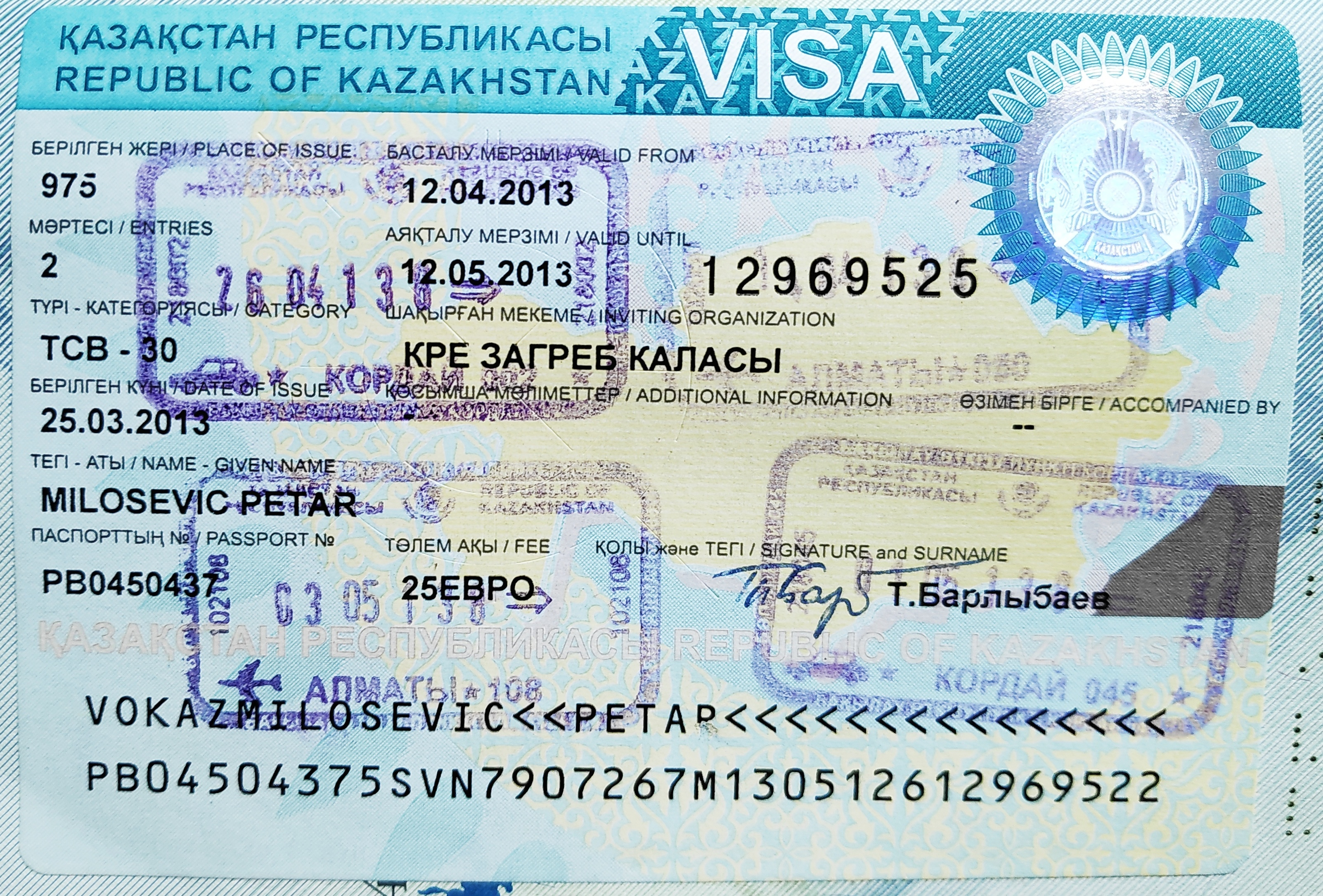
Kazakhstan Visa with entry stamps of Almaty Airport and Korday border

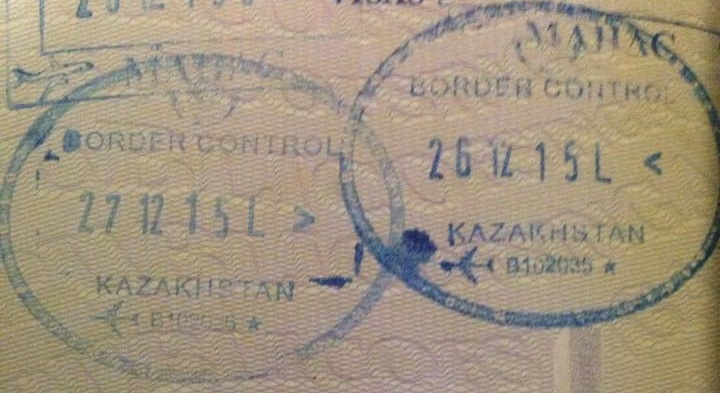
Kazakhstan entry and exit stamps issued to a Singaporean national at Almaty International Airport

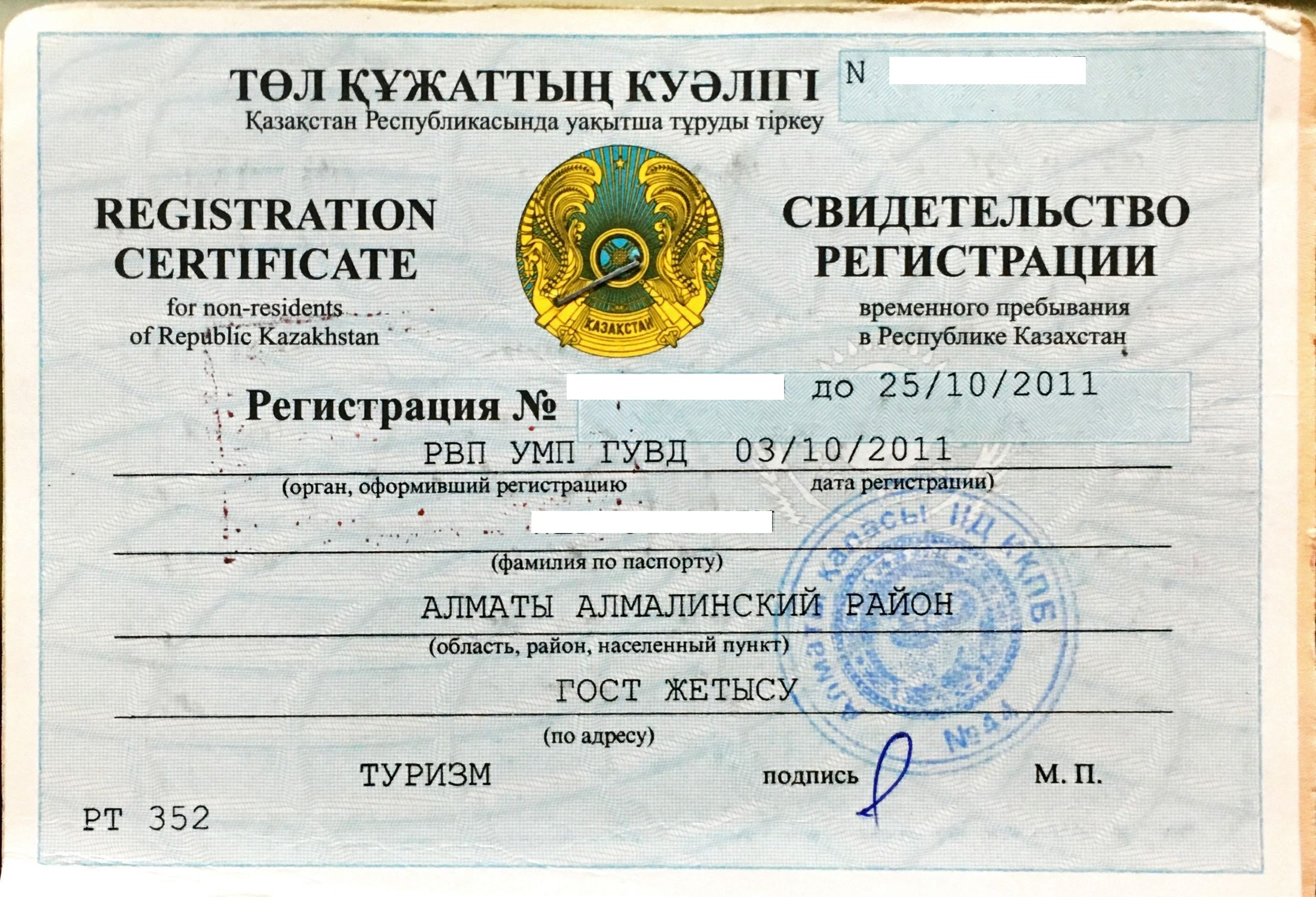
Registration Certificate for non-residents of Republic Kazakhstan

Kazakhstan's visa and other migration policies are also implemented in accordance with the mobility rights arrangements within the Commonwealth of Independent States and the rules of the single market of the Eurasian Economic Union.

== Visa policy map ==
Visa policy of Kazakhstan Kazakhstan Visa not required - may enter with an internal passport or ID card (90 days) Visa not required (90 days) Visa not required (30 days) Visa not required (14 days) eVisa Visa required

== Visa exemption ==
=== Ordinary passports ===
Holders of ordinary passports of the following countries and territories may enter Kazakhstan without a visa for the following period:

90 days

- Albania^{2}
- Andorra^{2}
- Armenia^{1}
- Belarus^{1}
- Georgia
- Kyrgyzstan^{ID} ^{1}
- Moldova
- Mongolia
- Russia^{IP} ^{1}
- Saint Kitts and Nevis^{2}
- Turkey^{1}
- Ukraine^{1}

30 days

- Argentina^{6}
- Azerbaijan
- Brazil
- China^{C} ^{1}
- Ecuador
- Maldives
- Morocco^{5}
- Nicaragua^{5}
- Serbia
- Seychelles^{1}
- South Korea^{3}
- Tajikistan
- United Arab Emirates
- Uzbekistan
- Vietnam

14 days

- Hong Kong^{C}
- India^{4}
- Iran^{4}
- Macau^{C}

_{ID - May enter with an ID card.}
_{IP - May enter with an internal passport.}
_{C - For Chinese citizens with People's Republic of China passports, Hong Kong Special Administrative Region passports or Macao Special Administrative Region passports only.}
_{1 – 90 days within any 180-day period.}
_{2 – 90 days within any 365-day period.}
_{3 – 60 days within any 180-day period.}
_{4 – 42 days within any 180-day period.}
_{5 – 30 days within any 180-day period.}
_{6 – 30 days within a year.}

==== Visa exemption program ====
Citizens of the following countries may enter Kazakhstan without a visa for 30 days as part of a visa-free policy for countries with the large foreign direct investment in Kazakhstan's economy. These visitors can stay for a maximum of 90 days within any 180-day period (counted from the first entry).

The program was initially started on 15 July 2014 providing unilateral visa free access to 10 countries and in July 2015 it was further extended to a total of 19 countries, then to 43 in January 2017 and to 54 in September 2019.

- All European Union member states

- Australia
- Bahrain
- Canada
- Chile
- Colombia
- Iceland
- Indonesia
- Israel
- Japan
- Kuwait
- Liechtenstein
- Malaysia
- Mexico
- Monaco
- New Zealand
- Norway
- Oman
- Philippines
- Qatar
- San Marino
- Saudi Arabia
- Singapore
- South Korea
- Switzerland
- Thailand
- United Kingdom
- United States
- Vatican City

Date of visa changes

Citizens of Armenia, Azerbaijan, Belarus, Georgia, Kyrgyzstan, Moldova, Russia, Tajikistan, Ukraine, Uzbekistan have never required a visa to enter Kazakhstan.

- 2 March 1992: Turkey
- 2 January 1995: Mongolia
- 28 May 2011: Serbia
- 26 July 2012: Hong Kong
- 15 July 2014: France, Germany, Italy, Japan, Malaysia, Netherlands, United Kingdom and United States
- 1 November 2014: Argentina
- 29 November 2014: South Korea
- 15 July 2015: Australia, Belgium, Finland, Hungary, Monaco, Norway, Singapore, Spain, Sweden and Switzerland
- 31 August 2016: Ecuador
- 6 September 2016: Brazil
- 1 January 2017: Austria, Bulgaria, Canada, Chile, Croatia, Cyprus, Czech Republic, Denmark, Estonia, Greece, Israel, Ireland, Iceland, Latvia, Lithuania, Luxembourg, Malta, Mexico, New Zealand, Poland, Portugal, Romania, Slovakia and Slovenia
- 10 March 2018: United Arab Emirates
- 29 September 2019: Bahrain, Colombia, Indonesia, Kuwait, Liechtenstein, Oman, Philippines, Qatar, Saudi Arabia, Thailand, Vatican City
- 8 July 2022: China, India and Iran
- 14 September 2022: Maldives
- 28 February 2023: Andorra
- 25 April 2023: Albania
- 26 July 2023: Nicaragua
- 6 January 2024: Seychelles
- 25 May 2024: Vietnam
- 24 October 2024: Macau
- 20 November 2024: Saint Kitts and Nevis

Cancelled:

- Estonia, Latvia and Lithuania: 22 October 1993 (was resumed in 2017)
- Hungary: 6 November 1996 (was resumed in 2015)
- Turkmenistan: 1 March 2001
- Cuba: 10 January 2005

- Turkmenistan - residents of Balkan Region have visa-free entry to Atyrau Province and Mangystau Province for up to 5 days.

=== Non-ordinary passports ===
Under reciprocal agreements, holders of diplomatic or service passports of the following countries may enter and remain in Kazakhstan without a visa:

- All European Union member states^{1 2 D S}

- Albania^{5 D S}
- Andorra^{5 D S}
- Argentina^{3 D S}
- Armenia^{4 D S}
- Australia^{6 D S}
- Azerbaijan^{6 D S}
- Bahrain^{6 D S}
- Belarus^{4 D S}
- Bosnia and Herzegovina^{6 D S}
- Brazil^{3 D S}
- Canada^{6 D S}
- Chile^{3 D S}
- China^{6 D S}
- Colombia^{3 D S}
- Cuba^{6 D S}
- Ecuador^{7 D S}
- Egypt^{3 D}
- Georgia^{3 D S}
- Hong Kong^{8 D S}
- Iceland^{6 D S}
- India^{6 D S}
- Indonesia^{6 D S}
- Iran^{6 D S}
- Israel^{3 D S}
- Japan^{3 D S}
- Jordan^{6 D S}
- Kuwait^{3 D S}
- Kyrgyzstan^{4 D S}
- Laos^{4 D S}
- Liechtenstein^{6 D S}
- Malaysia^{6 D S}
- Maldives^{6 D S}
- Mexico^{3 D S}
- Moldova^{3 D S}
- Monaco^{6 D S}
- Mongolia^{3 D S}
- Montenegro^{3 D S}
- Morocco^{6 D S}
- New Zealand^{6 D S}
- Nicaragua^{7 D S}
- North Macedonia^{6 D S}
- Norway^{1 D S}
- Oman^{6 D S}
- Pakistan^{6 D S}
- Paraguay^{3 D S}
- Philippines^{6 D S}
- Qatar^{6 D S}
- Russia^{4 D S}
- Rwanda^{7 D S}
- Saint Kitts and Nevis^{5 D S}
- San Marino^{6 D S}
- Saudi Arabia^{4 D S}
- Serbia^{6 D S}
- Seychelles^{6 D S}
- Sierra Leone^{7 D S}
- Singapore^{6 D S}
- South Korea^{3 D S}
- Sri Lanka^{6 D S}
- Switzerland^{3 D S}
- Tajikistan^{6 D S}
- Thailand^{6 D S}
- Turkey^{3 D S}
- Turkmenistan^{6 D S}
- Ukraine^{4 D S}
- United Arab Emirates^{3 D S}
- United Kingdom^{6 D S}
- United States^{6 D S}
- Uzbekistan^{6 D S}
- Vatican City^{1 D S}
- Venezuela^{3 D S}
- Vietnam^{6 D S}

_{D - Diplomatic passports}
_{S - Service passports}
_{1 – 90 days for diplomatic passports, 30 days for service passports.}
_{2 - For citizens of Belgium, Luxembourg, the Netherlands: 90 days for diplomatic passports; for citizens of Bulgaria, Cyprus, Hungary, Romania, Slovakia: 90 days for diplomatic or service passports; for citizens of Croatia, Ireland, Malta, Sweden: 30 days for diplomatic or service passports.}
_{3 – 90 days}
_{4 – 90 days within any 180-day period.}
_{5 – 90 days within any 365-day period.}
_{6 – 30 days}
_{7 – 30 days within any 180-day period.}
_{8 – 14 days}

A visa is not required for holders of a UN Laissez-Passer for up to 30 days within any 180-day period.

=== Future changes ===
Kazakhstan has signed visa exemption agreements with the following countries, but they have not yet entered into force:

Country	Passports	Agreement signed on
Benin	Diplomatic, service	25 September 2026
Nepal	Diplomatic, official, service	25 September 2026
Suriname	Diplomatic, official	25 January 2024

- In December 2018, it was announced that Kazakhstan and Uzbekistan planned to mutually accept visas from February 2019, but this was delayed.
- In March 2019, it was reported that Kazakhstan and Uzbekistan were "ready to launch" a joint visa program that could extend to neighboring countries. All approvals have already been obtained, all that remains is to work out the technical details and equipment.

== Electronic visa (e-Visa) ==
Citizens of other countries (except Afghanistan, Cape Verde, Democratic Republic of Congo, Equatorial Guinea, Iraq, Jordan, Libya, Pakistan, Palestine, Solomon Islands, Somalia, South Sudan, Sudan, Syria, Taiwan, Timor-Leste and Yemen) may obtain an e-Visa.

Kazakhstan issues business, investor, medical treatment and tourist e-visas. Holders of an e-visa must arrive via Nursultan Nazarbayev International Airport (Astana) or Almaty International Airport (Almaty).

== Visa required in advance ==
Citizens of the following countries and territories must apply for a visa at a Kazakhstan embassy or consulate:

- Afghanistan
- Cape Verde
- DR Congo
- Equatorial Guinea
- Iraq
- Jordan
- Libya
- Pakistan
- Palestine
- Solomon Islands
- Somalia
- South Sudan
- Sudan
- Syria
- Taiwan
- Timor-Leste
- Yemen

== Pre-arranged visa on arrival ==
A pre-arranged visa for a stay of up to 1 month may be obtained on arrival for citizens arriving from a country without a Kazakh diplomatic mission. The fee is approximately 80 USD, and they must hold an invitation letter and obtain an approval from the Kazakh Ministry of Foreign Affairs. They must enter via one of the following ports of entry:

- Aktau Airport
- Almaty International Airport
- Atyrau Airport
- Oral Ak Zhol Airport
- Nursultan Nazarbayev International Airport

== Visa types ==
Kazakhstan issues 39 types of visa.

A
A	Diplomatic visa	
A	A1	Issued to foreign dignitaries, diplomats traveling on official business and diplomatic couriers
A	A2	Issued to diplomats accredited to Kazakhstan
A	Service visa	
A	A3	Issued to members of the official delegations, accredited mass media journalists, military personnel on official visits and dependents, members of international organizations, diplomatic couriers without a diplomatic passport, service passport holders on official business
A	A4	Issued to administrative-technical and maintenance staff of foreign missions and offices
A	Investor visa	
A	A5	Issued to heads and deputy heads and heads of structural divisions of legal entities carrying out investment activities and their family members
B
B	Business visa	
B	B1	Issued to participants of conferences and meetings, persons accompanying humanitarian aid, lecturers, participants in youth programs and student and school exchanges
B	B2	Issued to persons installing or maintaining equipment or to persons providing consulting and auditing services
B	B3	Issued to persons arriving for negotiations or to the founders or the board directors
B	International road carriage visa	
B	B4	Issued to persons engaged in international road transport
B	B5	Issued to aircraft, train and sea and river vessel crews
B	Visa for participation in religious events	
B	B6	Issued to persons participating in the activities of religious associations, except for missionary activity
B	Student visa	
B	B7	Issued to persons for practical training or internships and their family members
B	Permanent residence visa	
B	B8	Issued to persons arriving to register a permit for permanent residence
B	B9	Issued to persons arriving for permanent residence
B	Private visit visa	
B	B10	Issued to persons traveling for private reasons, funerals, former compatriots, persons accompanying family members who are citizens of Kazakhstan and spouses or children of ethnic Kazakhs
B	Adoption visa	
B	B11	Issued to persons for adoption of citizens of Kazakhstan
B	Tourist visa	
B	B12	Issued to persons traveling as tourists
B	Transit visa	
B	B13	Issued to persons transiting through the territory of Kazakhstan
B	Exit visa	
B	B14	Issued to permanent residents when exiting for permanent residence abroad
B	B15	Issued to persons who have lost their passport in Kazakhstan
B	B16	Issued to persons whose visa validity was reduced
B	B17	Issued to persons under administrative responsibility, not associated with deportation, if there are no reasons for further stay
B	B18	Issued to persons who arrived or are staying without a valid visa, if there are no reasons for further stay
B	B19	Issued to persons who have served criminal sentence or were exempted or whose probationary control or deferral expired
B	B20	Issued to persons who have presented proof of force majeure for overstay
B	B21	Issued to persons who were victims of grave or especially grave crimes
B	B22	Issued to persons charged with criminal offense where the criminal case has been closed or other persons in respect of whom legal restrictions on exit are lifted
C
C	Permanent residence visa	
C	C1	Issued to ethnic Kazakhs traveling to Kazakhstan for permanent residence
C	Family reunification visa	
C	C2	Issued to family members of Kazakhstan national who are permanently residing in Kazakhstan, ethnic Kazakhs and former compatriots with temporary residence permit, foreigners and stateless persons permanently residing in Kazakhstan as well as business immigrants
C	Work visa	
C	C3	Issued to persons traveling to Kazakhstan or persons in Kazakhstan and their family members for the purpose of employment
C	C4	Issued to persons traveling to Kazakhstan or persons in Kazakhstan for self-employment in professions that are in demand in the priority sectors of the economy
C	C5	Issued to business immigrants
C	C6	Issued to seasonal workers
C	Missionary activity visa	
C	C7	Issued to persons carrying out missionary activities and their family members
C	Humanitarian purposes visa	
C	C8	Issued to volunteers and providers of humanitarian aid and with a view to charity and grants provision
C	Education visa	
C	C9	Issued for the purpose of admission to educational organization in secondary, technical and vocational, post-secondary, higher and postgraduate education
C	Private trip visa (ethnic Kazakhs)	
C	C10	Issued to ethnic Kazakhs
C	Minor citizens visa	
C	C11	Issued to underage persons permanently residing in Kazakhstan or who have arrived to Kazakhstan without a visa or to persons born in Kazakhstan intending to go abroad
C	Medical treatment visa	
C	C12	Issued to persons traveling for treatment, medical examination or consultation and accompanying persons as well as persons in Kazakhstan in the event of the need for treatment; persons traveling to Kazakhstan with the aim of caring for close relatives who are citizens of permanent residents of Kazakhstan and who are treated in hospitals or persons in Kazakhstan in case of need to care for close relatives

== Admission restrictions ==
Entry and transit is refused to citizens of Kosovo, even if not leaving the aircraft and proceeding by the same flight. Kazakhstan also does not recognize the passports of Abkhazia, the Sahrawi Republic, Somaliland, South Ossetia and Transnistria.

== Visitor statistics ==
Year	Visitors
1992—1995	No data
1996	▲202,000
1997	▲284,000
1998	▼257,000
1999	▲394,000
2000	▲1,683,000
2001	▲1,693,000
2002	▲3,678,000
2003	▼3,237,000
2004	▲4,291,000
2005	▲4,365,000
2006	▲4,707,000
2007	▲5,311,000
2008	▼4,117,000
2009	▼3,774,000
2010	▲4,097,000
2011	▲5,685,000
2012	▲6,163,000
2013	▲6,841,000
2014	▼6,333,000
2015	▲6,430,000
2016	▲6,509,000
2017	▲7,701,000
2018	▲8,789,000
2019	▼8,115,000
2020	▼2,035,000

Most visitors arriving in Kazakhstan were from the following countries of nationality:

Country	2017	2016	2015	2014	2013
Uzbekistan	▲3,344,577	▲2,459,757	▲2,297,180	▼2,107,177	▲2,494,568
Russia	▲1,708,873	▼1,587,409	▼1,646,568	▼1,757,721	▲1,780,574
Kyrgyzstan	▼1,273,378	▼1,348,709	▲1,359,625	▼1,308,139	▼1,382,706
Tajikistan	▲383,368	▲207,009	▲158,507	▼137,443	▲186,214
Azerbaijan	▲110,810	▲94,846	▲89,296	▼83,174	▲112,617
Germany	▲99,396	▲90,286	▲88,346	▲79,572	▼75,491
Turkey	▲98,840	▼89,611	▲106,301	▲104,986	▲92,070
China	▼94,817	▲117,465	▼111,706	▲228,617	▲205,066
Belarus	▲70,810	▲63,520	▲62,786	▲55,356	▲55,090
Ukraine	▼66,041	▼73,390	▲97,100	▲84,932	▲82,971
Turkmenistan	▲63,249	▼63,156	▲69,230	▲66,938	▲47,711
South Korea	▲30,582	▲22,276	▲22,046	▲20,445	▼16,620
United States	▲29,632	▼26,402	▲29,124	▲25,824	▼22,508
Armenia	▲26,169	▼26,097	▼37,461	▼39,934	▲54,244
India	▲21,890	▲13,975	▲11,170	▲10,725	▼9,929
United Kingdom	▲21,341	▼20,166	▲24,201	▲23,036	▼22,389
Total	▲7,701,196	▲6,509,390	▲6,430,158	▼6,332,734	▲6,841,085

== See also ==
- Visa requirements for citizens of Kazakhstan
