= United Nations Security Council Resolution 1574 =

United Nations Security Council resolution

UN Security Council Resolution 1574
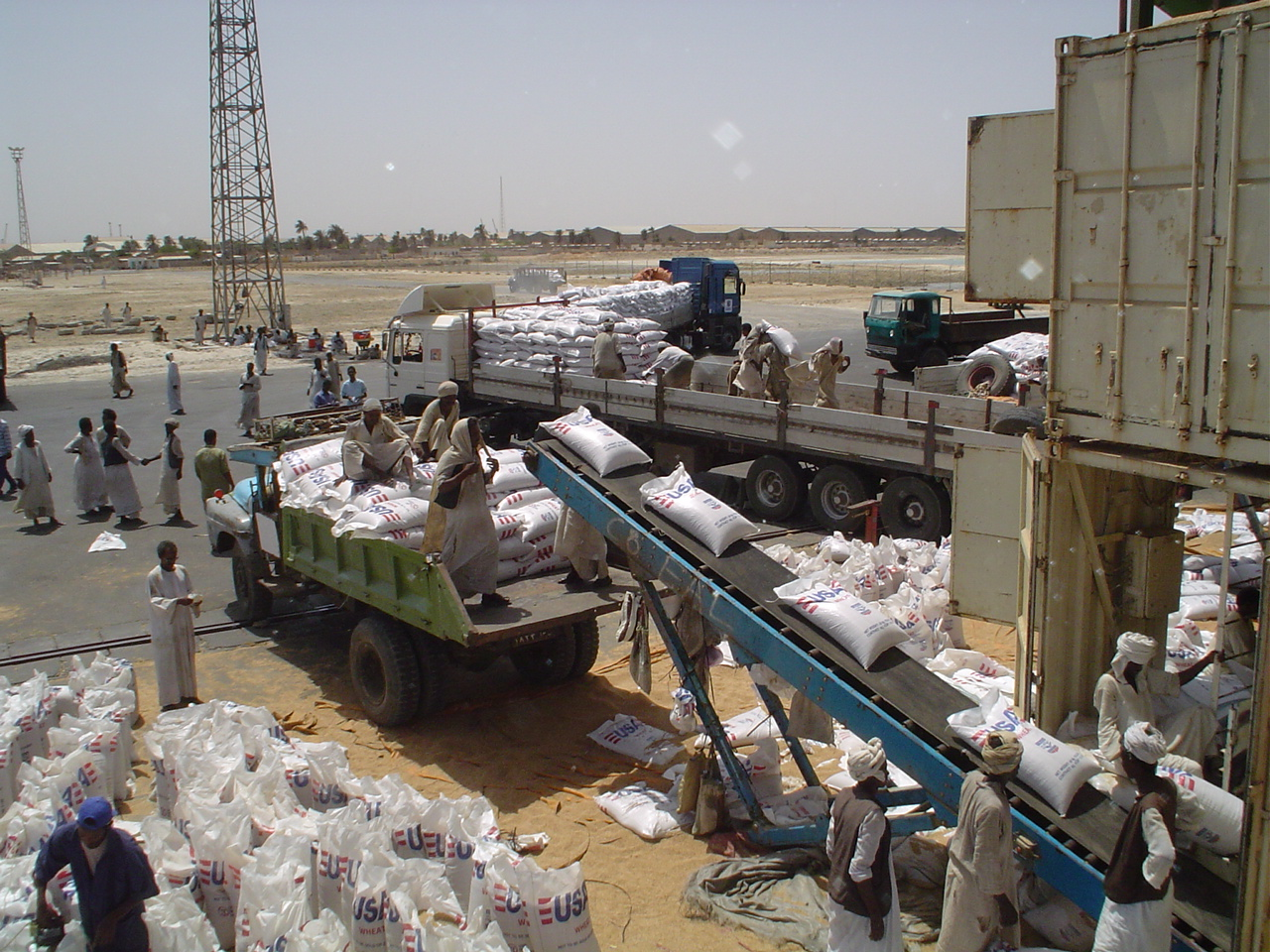
- Humanitarian aid being delivered to Sudan
- Date: 19 November 2004
- Meeting no.: 5,082
- Code: S/RES/1574 (Document)
- Subject: The situation concerning Sudan
- Voting summary: 15 voted for; None voted against; None abstained
- Result: Adopted

Security Council composition
- Permanent members: China; France; Russia; United Kingdom; United States
- Non-permanent members: Algeria; Angola; Benin; Brazil; Chile; Germany; Pakistan; Philippines; Romania; Spain

United Nations Security Council Resolution 1574 was adopted unanimously at a meeting in Nairobi, Kenya, on 19 November 2004, after recalling resolutions 1547 (2004), 1556 (2004) and 1564 (2004). The Council welcomed political efforts to resolve the conflicts in Sudan and reiterated its readiness to establish a mission to support the implementation of a Comprehensive Peace Agreement.

The resolution was adopted at the Security Council's first meeting in 14 years to be held outside its New York City headquarters; it was the fourth meeting held outside headquarters since 1952.

== Resolution ==
=== Observations ===
In the preamble of the resolution, the Security Council recalled that on 5 June 2004, the parties to the Sudan conflict signed a declaration agreeing to six protocols signed between the Sudanese government and Sudan People's Liberation Army/Movement (SPLA/M). The parties were urged to conclude a peace agreement as soon as possible.

Meanwhile, the council was concerned about the growing insecurity and violence in Darfur, violations of human rights and of the ceasefire. The government and rebel groups party to the conflict in the region were called upon to respect human rights, while it was emphasised that the Sudanese government was responsible for protecting its people.

=== Acts ===
Both the Sudanese government and the SPLA/M were encouraged to make further efforts towards a conclusive peace agreement, following which a peacekeeping operation would be established to monitor and support its implementation. At the same time, the mandate of the United Nations Advance Mission in Sudan (UNAMIS) was extended for three months until 10 March 2005 and its preparatory work was praised by the Council. The delivery of humanitarian aid was called for to the region.

The resolution further demanded that the government, rebel forces and all armed groups immediately end all violence and attacks and facilitate the safety of humanitarian staff in Darfur. It endorsed the decision of the African Union to expand its Darfur mission to 3,320 personnel.

Attached in the annex of the Resolution 1574 was a declaration on the conclusion of negotiations led by the Intergovernmental Authority on Development.

== See also ==
- African Union Mission in Sudan
- African Union – United Nations Hybrid Operation in Darfur
- International response to the War in Darfur
- List of United Nations Security Council Resolutions 1501 to 1600 (2003–2005)
- Southern Sudan
- Timeline of the War in Darfur
- United Nations Mission in Sudan
- War in Darfur
