= Kazakh identity card =

National identity card of Kazakhstan

Kazakh identity card (Jeke kuälık)
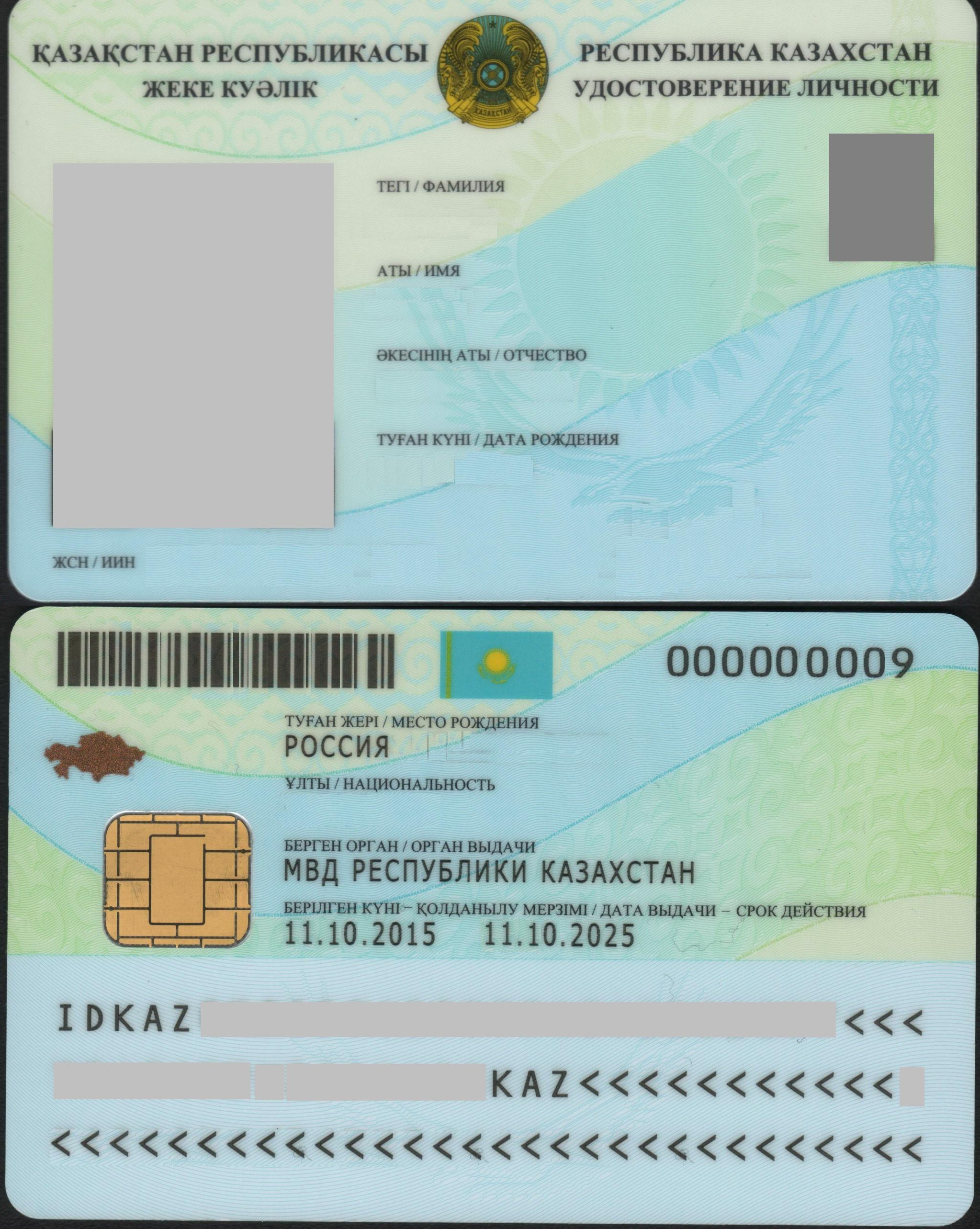
- Front and back of the card
- Type: Compulsory identity card, optional replacement for passport
- Issued by: Kazakhstan
- Purpose: Proof of identity
- Valid in: Kazakhstan Albania; Kyrgyzstan; Russia (if arriving directly from Kazakhstan)
- Eligibility: Kazakh citizenship
- Expiration: 10 years

Identity card of a citizen of the Republic of Kazakhstan (Kazakh: Жеке куәлік, romanized: Jeke kuälık; Russian: Удостоверение личности) is issued to citizens from the age of 16 and is valid on the territory of the republic. All citizens of the Republic of Kazakhstan permanently residing in its territory must have an identity card. It was introduced in 1994 shortly after independence to replace the Soviet passport.

The certificate indicates: Surname, Name, Middle name, Date of birth, Individual identification number, Nationality, ID number, Place of birth, Document issuing authority, Document validity period. The identity card is issued with a validity period of 10 years and changes after the expiration date. When registering at a new place of permanent residence, information is overwritten on the electronic chip of a valid identity card, no replacement is made.

Instead of a foreign passport, citizens of Kazakhstan can use an identity card when traveling to Albania, the Russian Federation (only directly from Kazakhstan) and Kyrgyzstan - respectively, citizens of Russia and Kyrgyzstan can enter Kazakhstan on internal documents without a passport.

In 2008, a new type of identity card with a 64 kb chip was put into circulation. It is a smart card measuring 85.72 x 54.03 millimeters with rounded corners, made of wear-resistant multilayer material.

On 1 December 2014, updated identity cards are introduced; as reported by the press service of the Ministry of Internal Affairs, “in the new identity card of a citizen of the Republic of Kazakhstan, the design was partially changed, the black-and-white photographic image was replaced with a color one, the color gamut, brightness and contrast of the document were improved. All degrees of protection of identity cards from counterfeiting are not only preserved, but also supplemented with new elements. Thus, an additional element of document security has been introduced: a holographic image of the owner of the document is placed in a reduced form on the right side of the front side of the identity card, which represents the highest degree of protection against counterfeiting."

== See also ==
- Kazakhstani passport
- Visa requirements for Kazakhstani citizens
