= Kazakhstani nationality law =

Kazakh Citizenship Act

Parliament of Kazakhstan
- Long title: An Act relating to Kazakh citizenship
- Enacted by: Government of Kazakhstan
- Status: Current legislation

Kazakh nationality law is governed by the Constitution of Kazakhstan and the Law on Citizenship (of 1991, with updates in 2002).

== Dual citizenship ==
Dual citizenship is prohibited under the Kazakhstani nationality law, and is grounds for refusal of nationality.

== Acquisition ==
=== By descent ===
The law in Kazakhstan follows the principles of jus sanguinis. Birth to one Kazakh parent is permitted.

=== By naturalisation ===
Naturalisation procedure in Kazakhstan is five years of residence. However, this is reduced to three years of residency in the case of marriage to a Kazakh citizen.

== Deprivation of nationality ==
In 2017, a new law was enacted to authorise the government to revoke nationality on the basis of terrorist or security based threats to the country.

== See also ==
- Visa requirements for citizens of Kazakhstan
- Kazakhstani passport
