= United Nations Security Council Resolution 1651 =

UN Security Council resolution on Sudan

UN Security Council Resolution 1651
- Darfur
- Date: 21 December 2005
- Meeting no.: 5,342
- Code: S/RES/1651 (Document)
- Subject: The situation concerning Sudan
- Voting summary: 15 voted for; None voted against; None abstained
- Result: Adopted

Security Council composition
- Permanent members: China; France; Russia; United Kingdom; United States
- Non-permanent members: Algeria; Argentina; Benin; Brazil; Denmark; Greece; Japan; Philippines; Romania; Tanzania

United Nations Security Council Resolution 1651, adopted unanimously on 21 December 2005, after recalling previous resolutions on the situation in Sudan, particularly resolutions 1556 (2004) and 1591 (2005), the Council extended the mandate of an expert panel monitoring sanctions against and violations of human rights in the Darfur region until 29 March 2006. It was the last Security Council resolution adopted in 2005.

== Observations ==
The Security Council stressed its commitment to peace in Sudan, the implementation of the Comprehensive Peace Agreement and the end of the violations in the Darfur region. It emphasised the need for respecting elements of the United Nations Charter, including those relating to the Convention on the Privileges and Immunities.

== Acts ==
The resolution, enacted under Chapter VII of the United Nations Charter, extended the expert panel established in Resolution 1591 (2005) until 29 March 2006 and requested it to report on the implementation of the sanctions and observations on human rights.

== See also ==
- African Union Mission in Sudan
- United Nations–African Union Mission in Darfur
- International response to the War in Darfur
- List of United Nations Security Council Resolutions 1601 to 1700 (2005–2006)
- South Sudan
- War in Darfur
