= Visa requirements for Kazakhstani citizens =

Requirements for Kazakh people to get international visa

Visa requirements for Kazakhstani citizens are administrative entry restrictions by the authorities of other states placed on citizens of Kazakhstan.

As of 2026, Kazakhstani citizens had visa-free or visa on arrival access to 78 countries and territories, ranking the Kazakhstani passport 57th in the world according to the Henley Passport Index.

Kazakhstani citizens in other countries also can benefit from the mobility rights arrangements within the Commonwealth of Independent States and the rules of the single market of the Eurasian Economic Union.

The tables indicate visa requirements for normal passport holders for tourism and other visiting purposes but do not imply entry for work, journalism, etc. Most of the countries below which are labelled as "not requiring visa", request a valid return ticket, documents for confirmed accommodation arrangements and evidence of adequate funds for self-support.

== Visa requirements map ==
Visa requirements for Kazakhstani citizens holding ordinary passports Kazakhstan Visa not required Visa on arrival eVisa Visa available both on arrival or online Visa required

== Travel documents of Kazakhstani citizens ==
For traveling to certain countries, Kazakhstani citizens do not need to use a passport, as they may use their Kazakhstani identity card.

Front cover of a biometric Kazakhstani passport

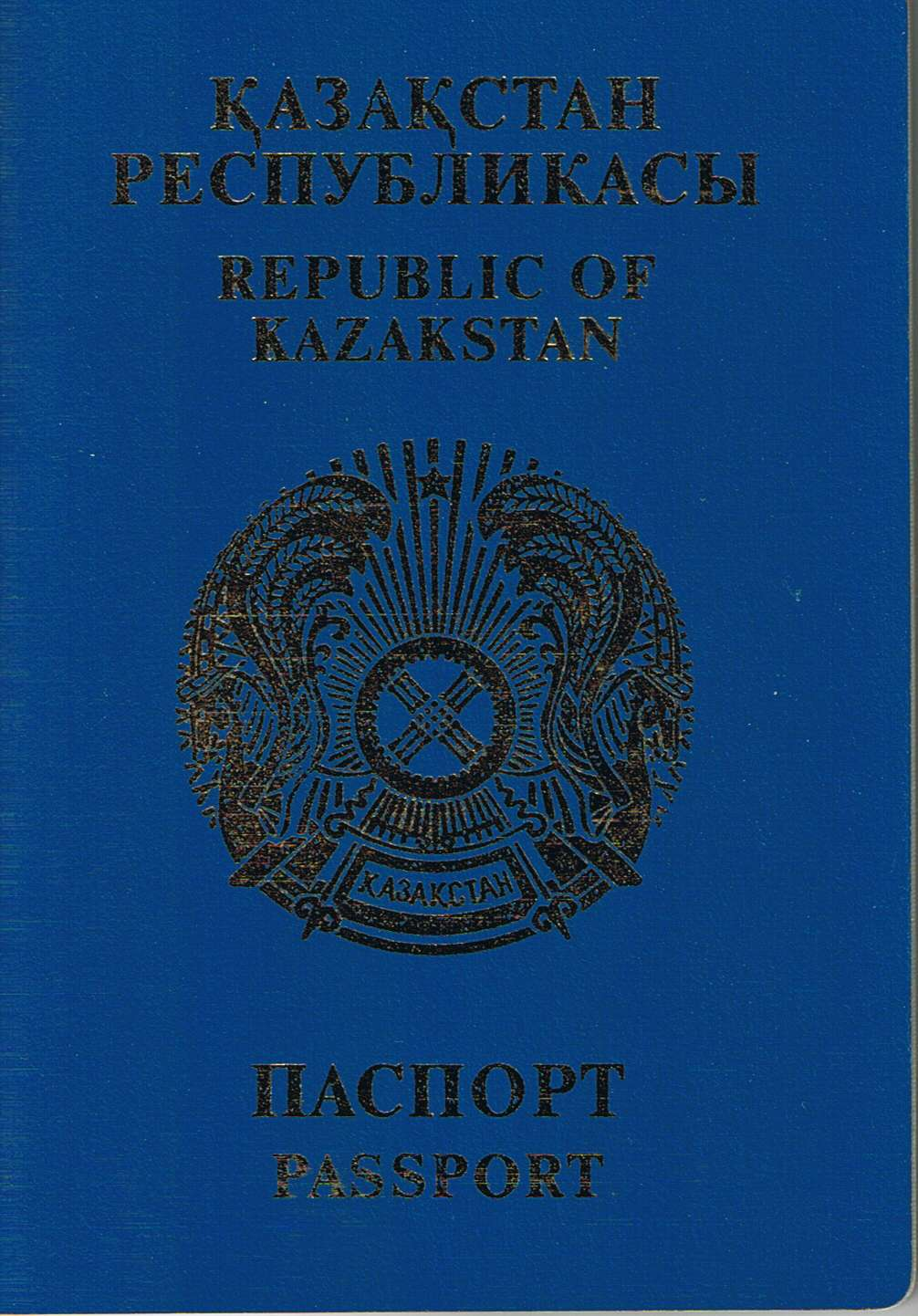
Front cover of a non-biometric Kazakhstani passport (not issued anymore)

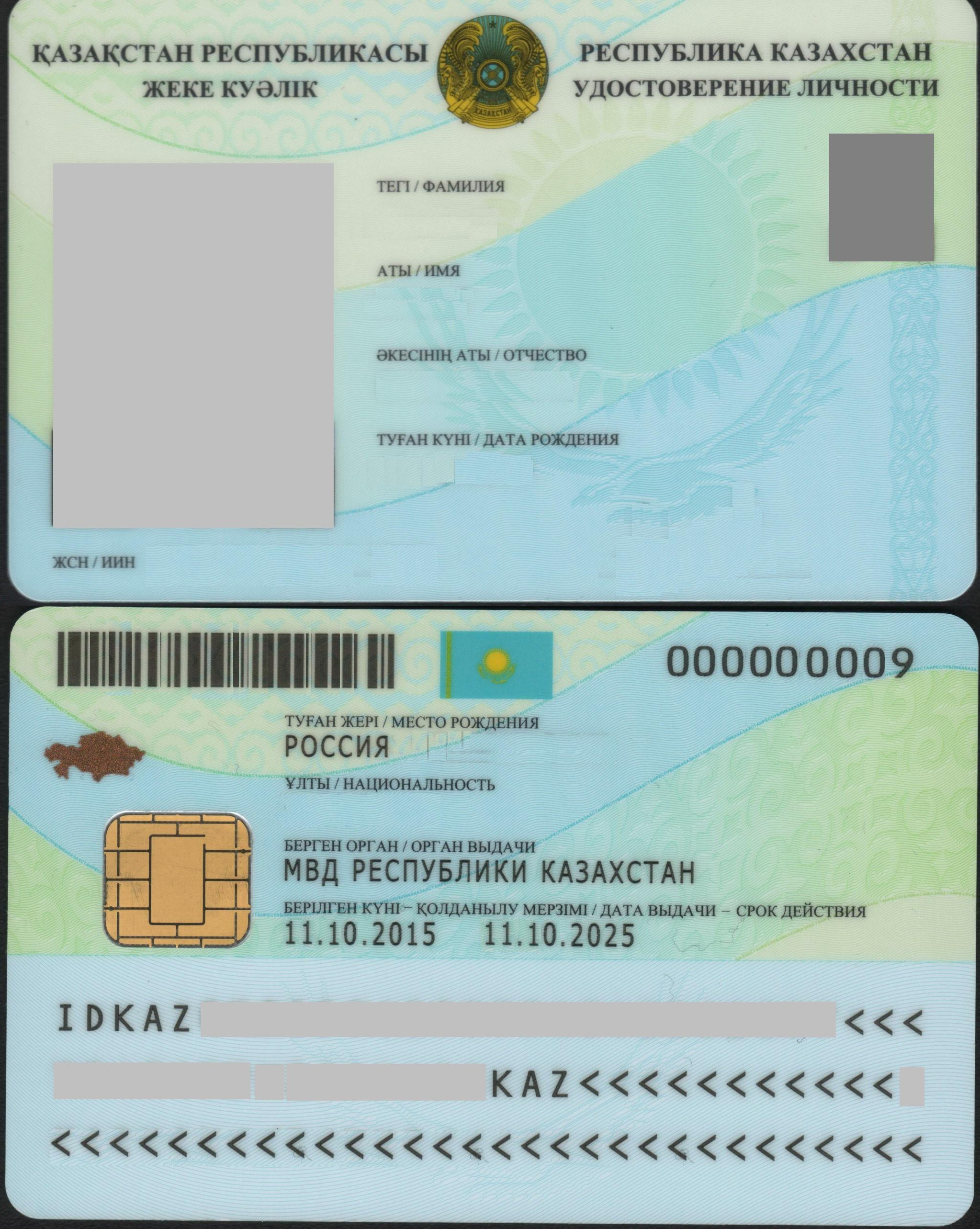
Kazakhstani identity card

== Changes ==
Visa requirements for Kazakhstani citizens were lifted by Turkey (2 April 1992), Mongolia (2 January 1995), Barbados (21 September 1995), Albania (29 June 1998), Samoa (15 December 1998), Ecuador, (15 July 1999), Cook Islands (4 February 2002), Antigua and Barbuda (17 February 2002), Haiti (14 February 2004), Philippines (15 April 2014), Dominica (13 May 2004), Namibia (2 August 2005), Niue (11 February 2007), Saint Vincent and the Grenadines (5 March 2007), Serbia (28 May 2012), Hong Kong (26 July 2012), Colombia (2014), Argentina (1 November 2014), South Korea (29 November 2014), Indonesia (September 2015), Brazil (6 September 2016), United Arab Emirates (10 March 2018), Oman (1 April 2022), Maldives (9 May 2022), Andorra (5 August 2022), Iran (11 November 2022), China (10 November 2023), Seychelles (6 January 2024), Thailand (19 April 2024), Vietnam (25 May 2024), Saint Kitts and Nevis (20 November 2024)., Morocco (13 February 2025)

Visa on arrival were introduced Cambodia (15 November 1995), Palau (2 July 1996), Cape Verde (27 March 1998), Laos (1 July 1998), Lebanon (4 March 1999), Kenya (15 March 1999), Bolivia (30 June 1999), Jordan (19 July 2000), Nicaragua (23 August 2000) Bangladesh (19 March 2001), Comores (1 July 2001), Jamaica (14 March 2002), Macao (11 May 2002), Uganda (9 November 2002), Zambia (15 January 2003), Nepal (16 February 2003), Madagascar (28 September 2003), Mauritius (19 January 2004), Tuvalu (15 October 2006), Mozambique (1 September 2008), Qatar (22 June 2017), Rwanda (1 January 2018) and Saudi Arabia (27 September 2019).

Electronic visas for Kazakhstani citizens were introduced: Australia (Electronic Visitor visa from November 2013), Lesotho (1 May 2017), Djibouti (18 February 2018), India (5 March 2018), Ethiopia (1 June 2018) and Saudi Arabia (27 September 2019).

Following countries have reinstated visa requirements for Kazakhstani citizens: Estonia (1 July 1992), Latvia (1993), Lithuania (1 November 1993), Slovakia (6 May 1994), Hungary (6 November 1996), Bulgaria (1 January 1999), Turkmenistan (19 June 1999), Romania (1 July 2000), Czech Republic (22 October 2000) and Poland (12 January 2001).

== Visa requirements ==
Visa requirements for holders of normal passports traveling for tourist purposes:

Country	Visa requirement	Allowed stay	Notes (excluding departure fees)	Reciprocity
Afghanistan	eVisa	30 days	e-Visa : Visitors must arrive at Kabul International (KBL).; Visitors may apply for an e-Visa in other countries, excluding some countries of residence (include Kazakhstan).	X
Albania	Visa not required	90 days	90 days within any 365-day period.	✓
Algeria	Visa required		Persons may be denied entry if entering with a passport containing visas or stamps issued by Israel.; Visitors on tours organized to some southern regions by an approved travel agency may obtain a visa on arrival for up to 30 days.	✓
Andorra	Visa not required	90 days	90 days within any 365-day period.; Although officially no visa is required, at least a Double Entry Schengen visa is required to enter Andorra since it has no own airport facility.	✓
Angola	eVisa	30 days	30 days per trip, but no more than 90 days within any 1 calendar year for tourism purposes only.; Visitors must have a return/onward ticket and a hotel reservation confirmation.; An International Certificate of Vaccination is required.	✓
Antigua and Barbuda	Visa not required	180 days		X
Argentina	Visa not required	30 days		✓
Armenia	Visa not required	180 days	180 days within a 1-year period.	✓
Australia and territories	Online Visa required		May apply online (Online Visitor e600 visa).	X
Austria	Visa required			X
Azerbaijan	Visa not required	90 days	90 days within any 180-day period.; If staying more than 15 days passengers visiting relatives must register with local police. If staying in a hotel, this will be arranged by the hotel.	✓
Bahamas	eVisa	3 months		✓
Bahrain	eVisa / Visa on arrival	14 days	Visa can be extended for an additional two weeks.; e-Visa issued for 14 days, extendable once.	X
Bangladesh	Visa on arrival	30 days	Visitors can apply to extend their stay when in the country.	X
Barbados	Visa not required	28 days		X
Belarus	Visa not required	Unlimited		✓
Belgium	Visa required			X
Belize	Visa required			✓
Benin	eVisa	30 days	Must have an international vaccination certificate.; Three types of electronic visa are offered: the e-Visa valid for 30 days for a single entry (50 EUR), the e-Visa valid for 30 days for several (multiple) entries (75 EUR), and the e-Visa valid for 90 days to make several (multiple) entries (100 EUR).	X
Bhutan	eVisa	90 days	The Sustainable Development Fee (SDF) of 200 USD per person, per night for almost all visitors to Bhutan. Additionally, if payment is made in US dollars from September 1, 2023 to August 31, 2027, the SDF is 100 USD.	X
Bolivia	Online Visa	30 days		X
Bosnia and Herzegovina	Visa required			✓
Botswana	eVisa	3 months		✓
Brazil	Visa not required	30 days		✓
Brunei	Visa required			✓
Bulgaria	Visa required			X
Burkina Faso	eVisa			✓
Burundi	Online Visa / Visa on arrival	1 month	Passengers holding an entry authorisation letter from the authorities may obtain a visa on arrival for a maximum stay of 1 month.	X
Cambodia	eVisa / Visa on arrival	30 days		X
Cameroon	eVisa		Pre-arranged visa can be picked up on arrival.	X
Canada	Visa required			X
Cape Verde	Visa required			X
Central African Republic	Visa required			✓
Chad	eVisa			X
Chile	Visa required			✓
China	Visa not required	30 days	A maximum total stay of 90 days within any 180-day period.	✓
Colombia	Visa not required	90 days	90 days - extendable up to 180-days stay within a 1-year period.	✓
Comoros	Visa on arrival	45 days		X
Republic of the Congo	Visa required			✓
Democratic Republic of the Congo	eVisa	7 days		X
Costa Rica	Visa required			✓
Côte d'Ivoire	eVisa	3 months	e-Visa holders must arrive via Port Bouet Airport.	X
Croatia	Visa required			X
Cuba	eVisa	90 days	Can be extended up to 90 days with a fee.	X
Cyprus	Visa required			X
Czech Republic	Visa required			X
Denmark	Visa required			X
Djibouti	eVisa	90 days		X
Dominica	Visa not required	21 days		X
Dominican Republic	Visa not required	90 days		X
Ecuador	Visa not required	90 days	Extension of stay is possible.	✓
Egypt	Visa required			X
El Salvador	Visa required			✓
Equatorial Guinea	eVisa			X
Eritrea	Visa required		Pre-arranged visa can be picked up on arrival.	✓
Estonia	Visa required			X
Eswatini	Visa required			✓
Ethiopia	eVisa	90 days	e-Visa holders must arrive via Addis Ababa Bole International Airport.	X
Fiji	Online Visa			✓
Finland	Visa required			X
France	Visa required			X
Gabon	eVisa	90 days	e-Visa holders must arrive via Libreville International Airport.	X
Gambia	Visa required			✓
Georgia	Visa not required	1 year		✓
Germany	Visa required			X
Ghana	Visa required		Pre-arranged emergency visa can be picked up on arrival.	✓
Greece	Visa required			X
Grenada	Visa required		Holders of a pre-clearance letter may collect visa upon arrival.	✓
Guatemala	Visa required			✓
Guinea	eVisa	90 days		X
Guinea-Bissau	Visa on arrival	90 days		X
Guyana	eVisa			X
Haiti	Visa not required	3 months		X
Honduras	Visa required			✓
Hungary	Visa required			X
Iceland	Visa required			X
India	eVisa	30 days	India to Offer Free 30-Day Visas to Kazakhstani citizens.; e-Visa holders must arrive via 32 designated airports (Note: Ahmedabad; Amritsar; Bagdogra; Bengaluru; Bhubaneswar; Chandigarh; Chennai; Coimbatore; Delhi; Gaya; Goa-Dabolim; Goa-Manohar; Guwahati; Hyderabad; Indore; Jaipur; Kannur; Kochi; Kolkata; Kozhikode; Lucknow; Madurai; Mangaluru; Mumbai; Nagpur; Port Blair; Pune; Surat; Thiruvananthapuram; Tiruchirappalli; Varanasi; Visakhapatnam) or 5 designated seaports. (Note: Chennai; Cochin; Mormugao (Goa); Mumbai; Mangalore); An Indian e-Tourist Visa may only be obtained twice within 1 calendar year.; Foreigners of Pakistani origin or who hold a Pakistani Passport are not eligible for an e-Visa. Foreigners who are not Pakistani nationals, but whose parents or grandparents (either paternal or maternal) were born in, or were permanent residents in Pakistan, are also not eligible for an e-Visa.	X
Indonesia	Visa not required	30 days		✓
Iran	Visa not required	14 days		✓
Iraq	eVisa	30 days		X
Ireland	Visa required		Visa waiver for UK 'C' visa holders, except "C" visas issued for the purpose of transiting the UK. First point of entry to the Common Travel Area need not be in the UK, but the UK visa must be stamped by a UK immigration officer within 180 days preceding arrival to Ireland. Must depart Ireland upon any of (1) UK visa expiration, (2) accumulating 90 days in Ireland within a 180-day period, (3) passage of 180 days since last UK arrival stamp.	X
Israel	Visa required			X
Italy	Visa required			X
Jamaica	Visa on arrival		Visa-free for holders of a valid visa issued by Canada, United States, United Kingdom or Schengen member states and who hold a proof that they are immunized against measles, rubella and polio	X
Japan	Visa required			X
Jordan	eVisa / Visa on arrival	3 months		X
Kenya	Electronic Travel Authorisation	90 days	Applications can be submitted up to 90 days prior to travel and must be submitted at least 3 days in advance.; eTA fee is 32.50 USD.; Proof of reservation at the hotel where visitors plan to stay is required (if staying with friends, an invitation letter is also acceptable).; Yellow fever vaccination certificate is required if coming from endemic countries.	X
Kiribati	Visa required			✓
North Korea	Visa required			✓
South Korea	Electronical Travel Authorization	30 days	A maximum total stay of 60 days within any 180-day period.; The validity period of a K-ETA is 3 years from the date of approval.	✓
Kuwait	Visa required		Pre-arranged visa can be picked up on arrival.	X
Kyrgyzstan	Visa not required	90 days	Citizens of eligible countries may re-enter the country 90 days after their last departure date.; ID Card valid.	✓
Laos	eVisa / Visa on arrival	30 days	18 (Note: Savannakhet Airport; Lanetoui - Mengkang (China); Meuangmom - Wan Pong (Myanmar); Banvang - Ban Khok Phai (Thailand); Namngeun - Huay Kon (Thailand); Paksan - Bueng Kan (Thailand); Paktaphan - Pak Saeng (Thailand); Pangmon - Ban Huak (Thailand); Phoudou (Thailand); Dak ta ock - Nam Giang (Vietnam); La Lai (Vietnam); Namkan (Vietnam); Namphao - Cau Treo (Vietnam); Namsoy - Na Meo (Vietnam); Naphao - Cha Lo (Vietnam); Pahang - Long Sap (Vietnam); Panghok - Tây Trang (Vietnam); Phoukeua - Bo Y (Vietnam)) of the 33 border crossings are only open to regular visa holders.; e-Visa may be used to enter Laos through the Luang Prabang, Pakse and Vientiane international airports, 3 Thai-Lao Friendship Bridges (Note: Vientiane (Friendship Bridge 1); Savannakhet (Friendship Bridge 2); Bokeo (Friendship Bridge 4)), in Boten (road and railroad), and in Vientiane (at Khamsavath railway station).; Visa on arrival is available at the Luang Prabang, Pakse and Vientiane international airports, 4 Thai-Lao Friendship Bridges (Note: Vientiane (Friendship Bridge 1); Savannakhet (Friendship Bridge 2); Khammouane (Friendship Bridge 3); Bokeo (Friendship Bridge 4)) and 7 border crossings. (Note: Nongnokkheane - Trapeang Kriel (Cambodia); Boten - Bo han (China); Golden Triangle/Samliemkham (Thailand); Khamsavath railway station (Thailand); Namheuang - Ban Na Kraseng (Thailand); Vang tao - Chongmek (Thailand); Dansavan - Lao Bảo (Vietnam))	X
Latvia	Visa required			X
Lebanon	Free visa on arrival	30 days	Can be extended stay for 2 additional months.; Holders of passports containing an Israeli stamp or visa will be refused entry in Lebanon.	X
Lesotho	Visa required			✓
Liberia	e-VOA	3 months		X
Libya	eVisa			X
Liechtenstein	Visa required			X
Lithuania	Visa required			X
Luxembourg	Visa required			X
Madagascar	eVisa / Visa on arrival	90 days	For stays of 61 to 90 days, the visa fee is 59 USD.	X
Malawi	eVisa	30 days		X
Malaysia	Visa not required	30 days		✓
Maldives	Visa not required	30 days		✓
Mali	Visa required			✓
Malta	Visa required			X
Marshall Islands	Visa on arrival	90 days		X
Mauritania	eVisa	30 days	Available at Nouakchott–Oumtounsy International Airport.	X
Mauritius	Visa on arrival	60 days		X
Mexico	Visa required		Travelers who wish to visit Mexico (regardless of their nationality or itinerary), holding either a valid, multiple entry visa OR who are permanent residents of the United States, Canada, Japan, Chile, Colombia, the United Kingdom or the EU Schengen Space countries, DO NOT require a Mexican tourist visa. Dependent upon the immigration officer, the maximum period of stay authorized is 180 days at a time.	X
Micronesia	Visa not required	30 days	Extension of stay is possible.	X
Moldova	Visa not required	90 days	90 days within any 180 day period.	✓
Monaco	Visa required			X
Mongolia	Visa not required	90 days		✓
Montenegro	Visa required			✓
Morocco	Visa not required	30 days		✓
Mozambique	eVisa / Visa on arrival	30 days	Visitors must pay a fee of 190 USD upon entry.; Available at Beira, Nampula, Maputo, Pemba, Tete and Vilankulo airports.	X
Myanmar	eVisa	28 days	e-Visa holders must arrive via Yangon, Nay Pyi Taw or Mandalay airports or via land border crossings with Thailand — Tachileik, Myawaddy and Kawthaung or India — Rih Khaw Dar and Tamu.; e-Visa is available for tourism only.	X
Namibia	eVisa / Visa on arrival	3 months / 90 days	Visa on arrival is available at the following locations: Hosea Kutako International Airport; Impalila Island; Katima Mulilo; Ngoma; Trans Kalahari (Buitepos); Walvis Bay Airport	X
Nauru	Visa required			✓
Nepal	Online Visa / Visa on arrival	90 days	Extension of stay is possible of up to 150 days.; Business travellers can obtain a visa on arrival for a maximum stay of 5 years, subject to a fee and a license issued by the Ministry of Industry.	X
Netherlands	Visa required			X
New Zealand	Visa required		Diplomatic, service and standard passports with the former USSR symbol issued in Kazakhstan are unacceptable, and visas will not be endorsed in them.; Holders of an Australian Permanent Resident Visa or Resident Return Visa may be granted a New Zealand Resident Visa on arrival permitting indefinite stay (pursuant to the Trans-Tasman Travel Arrangement), subject to meeting character requirements and obtaining an Electronic Travel Authority prior to departure.	X
Nicaragua	Visa not required	30 days	Tourist card must be obtained on arrival, subject to a fee.; Extension of stay is possible for additional 30 days for a fee.	X
Niger	Visa required			✓
Nigeria	eVisa	30 days		X
North Macedonia	Visa required			✓
Norway	Visa required			X
Oman	Visa not required	30 days	e-Visa for residents or holders of a visa of USA, Canada, Australia, UK or Schengen countries. Must have return tickets and confirmed hotel reservation.	✓
Pakistan	eVisa	3 months		X
Palau	Free Visa on arrival	30 days		X
Panama	Visa required			✓
Papua New Guinea	eVisa	60 days	Visitors may apply for a visa online under the "Tourist - Own Itinerary" category.	X
Paraguay	Visa required			✓
Peru	Visa required			✓
Philippines	Visa not required	30 days	A visa on arrival is available for a maximum stay of 59 days.; Extension of stay is only possible for those who obtained a visa on arrival, to a maximum of 1 year.	✓
Poland	Visa required			X
Portugal	Visa required			X
Qatar	Visa not required	30 days		✓
Romania	Visa required		Visa not required for 5 days for holders of a visa issued by Bulgaria.	X
Russia	Visa not required	90 days	ID Card valid (only directly from Kazakhstan); 90 days within one calendar year period.	✓
Rwanda	eVisa / Visa on arrival	30 days	A visa on arrival is available for 30 days.; Can also be entered on an East Africa Tourist Visa issued by Kenya or Uganda.	X
Saint Kitts and Nevis	Visa not required	90 days		✓
Saint Lucia	Visa required		Cruise ship passengers visiting for one day are exempted from obtaining a visa.	✓
Saint Vincent and the Grenadines	Visa not required	3 months		X
Samoa	Entry permit on arrival	90 days		X
San Marino	Visa not required	30 days	Although officially no visa is required under a bilateral agreement from 2024, at least a Single Entry Schengen visa is required to enter San Marino since it does not have an own airport facility and no border controls.	✓
São Tomé and Príncipe	eVisa			X
Saudi Arabia	eVisa / Visa on arrival	90 days		X
Senegal	Visa on arrival			X
Serbia	Visa not required	30 days	According to Serbia law must register within 24 hours of your arrival at the local police.	✓
Seychelles	Electronic Border System	3 months	±: Application can be submitted up to 30 days before travel.; Visitors must upload a reservation confirmation(s) for each visitor's location of stay in Seychelles.; Yellow fever vaccination certificate is required if coming from endemic countries.; Payment of the fee (EUR 10) by credit or debit card.; Valid for one journey only and it expires once exit the country.	X
Sierra Leone	eVisa	3 months		✓
Singapore	Visa required		Visa-free for 96 hours in case of transit to/from 3rd countries.	X
Slovakia	Visa required			X
Slovenia	Visa required			X
Solomon Islands	Visa required		Pre-arranged visa can be picked up on arrival.	✓
Somalia	eVisa	30 days		X
South Africa	Visa required			✓
South Sudan	eVisa		Obtainable online 30 days single entry for 100 USD, 90 days multiple entry for 200 USD and 180 days multiple entry for 350 USD.; Printed visa authorization must be presented at the time of travel.	X
Spain	Visa required			X
Sri Lanka	ETA / Visa on arrival	30 days		X
Sudan	Visa required			✓
Suriname	Visa not required	90 days	An entrance fee of USD 50 or EUR 50 must be paid online prior to arrival.; Multiple entry e-Visa is also available.	X
Sweden	Visa required			X
Switzerland	Visa required			X
Syria	eVisa / Visa on arrival		According to the IATA, visitors can be issued a visa on arrival allowing a 15-day stay.	X
Tajikistan	Visa not required	Unlimited		✓
Tanzania	eVisa / Visa on arrival	90 days		X
Thailand	Visa not required	60 days		✓
Timor-Leste	Visa on arrival	30 days	Visa on arrival is only available at the Presidente Nicolau Lobato International Airport or at the Dili Sea Port.; Extension of stay possible for up to 90 days.	X
Togo	eVisa	15 days		X
Tonga	Visa required			✓
Trinidad and Tobago	Visa required			✓
Tunisia	Visa not required	90 days		✓
Turkey	Visa not required	90 days	90 days within any 180 day period.	✓
Turkmenistan	Visa required		10-day visa on arrival if holding a letter of invitation provided by a company registered in Turkmenistan with a prior approval from the Foreign Ministry. Visitors can apply to extend their stay for an additional 10 days.; When transiting between two non-bordering countries, visitors can obtain a Turkmenistan transit visa for a five-day stay. This must be applied for in advance at the Turkmenistan Embassy. Visitors must also submit copies of the visas for the country of entry into Turkmenistan and the country of departure from Turkmenistan. Visa fee is 20 USD.	✓
Tuvalu	Visa on arrival	1 month		X
Uganda	eVisa	3 months	Can also be entered on an East Africa Tourist Visa issued by Kenya or Rwanda.	X
Ukraine	Visa not required	90 days	90 days within any 180 day period.; The Law of Ukraine on entry to the territory of the Autonomous Republic of Crimea and Sevastopol need a special permission. If entry - exit without a special permission then entry into Ukraine is not allowed.	✓
United Arab Emirates	Visa not required	30 days		✓
United Kingdom	Visa required			X
United States	Visa required			X
Uruguay	Visa required			✓
Uzbekistan	Visa not required	Unlimited		✓
Vanuatu	eVisa	120 days		✓
Vatican City	Visa required		Open borders but de facto follows Italian visa policy.	X
Venezuela	eVisa			X
Vietnam	Visa not required	30 days	30 calendar days from the date of entry, for a total of 90 calendar days every six months.	✓
Yemen	Visa required		Yemen introduced an e-Visa system for visitors who meet certain eligibility requirements (group travel of 10 or more people, business trips, and transit etc.).	✓
Zambia	eVisa / Visa on arrival	90 days	For those travelling to Zambia for business, the maximum stay is 30 days in any 1-year period.; Tourists are allowed 90 days in any 1-year period.; Also eligible for a universal visa allowing access to Zimbabwe.	X
Zimbabwe	eVisa / Visa on arrival	1 month	Extension of stay is possible for up to 90 days if the purpose is tourism.; For those travelling to Zimbabwe for business, a visa on arrival can also be issued for a maximum stay of 30 days.; Also eligible for a universal visa allowing access to Zambia.	X

== Dependent, Disputed, or Restricted territories ==
Unrecognized or partially recognized countries

Countries	Conditions of access	Notes
Abkhazia	Visa not required	14 days
Kosovo	Visa required	Do not need a visa a holder of a valid biometric residence permit issued by one of the Schengen member states or a valid multi-entry Schengen Visa, a holder of a valid Laissez-Passer issued by United Nations Organizations, NATO, OSCE, Council of Europe or European Union a holder of a valid travel documents issued by EU Member and Schengen States, United States of America, Canada, Australia and Japan based on the 1951 Convention on Refugee Status or the 1954 Convention on the Status of Stateless Persons, as well as holders of valid travel documents for foreigners (max. 15 days stay)
Northern Cyprus	Visa not required	
Palestine	Visa not required	Arrival by sea to Gaza Strip not allowed.
Somaliland	Visa required	
South Ossetia	Visa required	To enter South Ossetia, visitors must have a multiple-entry visa for Russia and register their stay with the Migration Service of the Ministry of Internal Affairs within 3 days.
Taiwan	Visa required	May apply for an e-Visa if holding a valid visa or resident certificate issued by a Schengen country, or a valid resident certificate or visa valid for more than 180 days issued by the United States.
Transnistria	Visa not required	Registration required after 24h.

Dependent and autonomous territories

Countries	Conditions of access	Notes
China
Hong Kong	Visa not required	14 days
Macau	Visa not required	14 days
Denmark
Faroe Islands	Visa required	
Greenland	Visa required	
Ecuador
Galápagos	Pre-registration required	60 days; Visitors must pre-register to receive a 20 USD Transit Control Card (TCT).
France
French Guiana	Visa required	
French Polynesia	Visa required	
(France) French West Indies	Visa required	French West Indies refers to Martinique, Guadeloupe, Saint Martin and Saint Barthélemy.
Mayotte	Visa required	
New Caledonia	Visa required	
Réunion	Visa required	
Saint Pierre and Miquelon	Visa required	
Wallis and Futuna	Visa required	
Netherlands
Aruba	Visa required	
Caribbean Netherlands	Visa required	(includes Bonaire, Sint Eustatius and Saba)
Curaçao	Visa required	
Sint Maarten	Visa required	
New Zealand
Cook Islands	Visa not required	31 days
Niue	Visa not required	30 days
Tokelau	Visa required	
United Kingdom
Anguilla	eVisa	
Bermuda	Visa required	Visa-free for a maximum stay of 3 months if transiting through the United Kingdom.
British Indian Ocean Territory	Special permit required	Special permit required.
British Virgin Islands	Visa required	
Cayman Islands	Visa required	
Falkland Islands	Visa required	
Gibraltar	Visa required	
Guernsey	Visa required	
Isle of Man	Visa required	
Jersey	Visa required	
Montserrat	eVisa	
Pitcairn Islands	Visa not required	14 days visa-free and landing fee 35 USD or tax of 5 USD if not going ashore.
Ascension Island	eVisa	3 months within any year period.
Saint Helena	eVisa	
Tristan da Cunha	Permission required	Permission to land required for 15/30 pounds sterling (yacht/ship passenger) for Tristan da Cunha Island or 20 pounds sterling for Gough Island, Inaccessible Island or Nightingale Islands.
South Georgia and the South Sandwich Islands	Permit required	Pre-arrival permit from the Commissioner required (72 hours/1 month for 110/160 pounds sterling).
Turks and Caicos Islands	Visa required	Holders of a valid visa issued by Canada, United Kingdom or the USA do not required a visa for a maximum stay of 90 days.
United States
American Samoa	Visa required	
Guam	Visa required	
Northern Mariana Islands	Visa required	
U.S. Virgin Islands	Visa required	
Puerto Rico	Visa required	
Antarctica and adjacent islands
Special permits required for Bouvet Island, British Antarctic Territory, French Southern and Antarctic Lands, Argentine Antarctica, (Australia) Australian Antarctic Territory, (Antártica Chilena Province) Chilean Antarctic Territory, (Australia) Heard Island and McDonald Islands, (Norway) Peter I Island, (Norway) Queen Maud Land, (New Zealand) Ross Dependency.

== Limitations on passport use ==
- Arab League - As a result of the Arab League boycott of Israel, many Arab League countries refuse entry to travelers whose passport shows evidence of entry into Israel or hold an unused Israeli visa.
  - Iran - Admission is refused for holders of passports containing an Israeli visa/stamp in the last 12 months
- Azerbaijan - As a result of the First Nagorno-Karabakh War between Azerbaijan and Armenia, Azerbaijan refuses entry to individuals of Armenian descent who hold Kazakhstan or other passports. It also strictly refuses entry to foreigners in general whose passport shows evidence of entry into the self-proclaimed Nagorno-Karabakh Republic, declaring them a so-called personae non gratae.

== Vaccination ==
Many African countries, including Angola, Benin, Burkina Faso, Cameroon, Central African Republic, Chad, Democratic Republic of the Congo, Republic of the Congo, Côte d'Ivoire, Equatorial Guinea, Gabon, Ghana, Guinea, Liberia, Mali, Mauritania, Niger, Rwanda, São Tomé and Príncipe, Senegal, Sierra Leone, Uganda, Zambia require all incoming passengers to have a current International Certificate of Vaccination. Some other countries require vaccination only if the passenger is coming from an infected area.

== Passport validity ==
Many countries require passport validity of no less than 6 months and 1 or 2 blank pages.

== See also ==
- Visa policy of Kazakhstan
- Kazakhstani passport
- Foreign relations of Kazakhstan
