= United Nations laissez-passer =

Diplomatic travel document

- The front cover of a blue biometric United Nations laissez-passer.

- Type: Laissez-passer
- Issued by: United Nations and the International Labour Organization
- Purpose: Identification
- Eligibility: UN officials and officials of the United Nations Specialized Agencies and the IAEA
- Size: 88 mm × 125 mm (3.5 in × 4.9 in)

United Nations laissez-passer
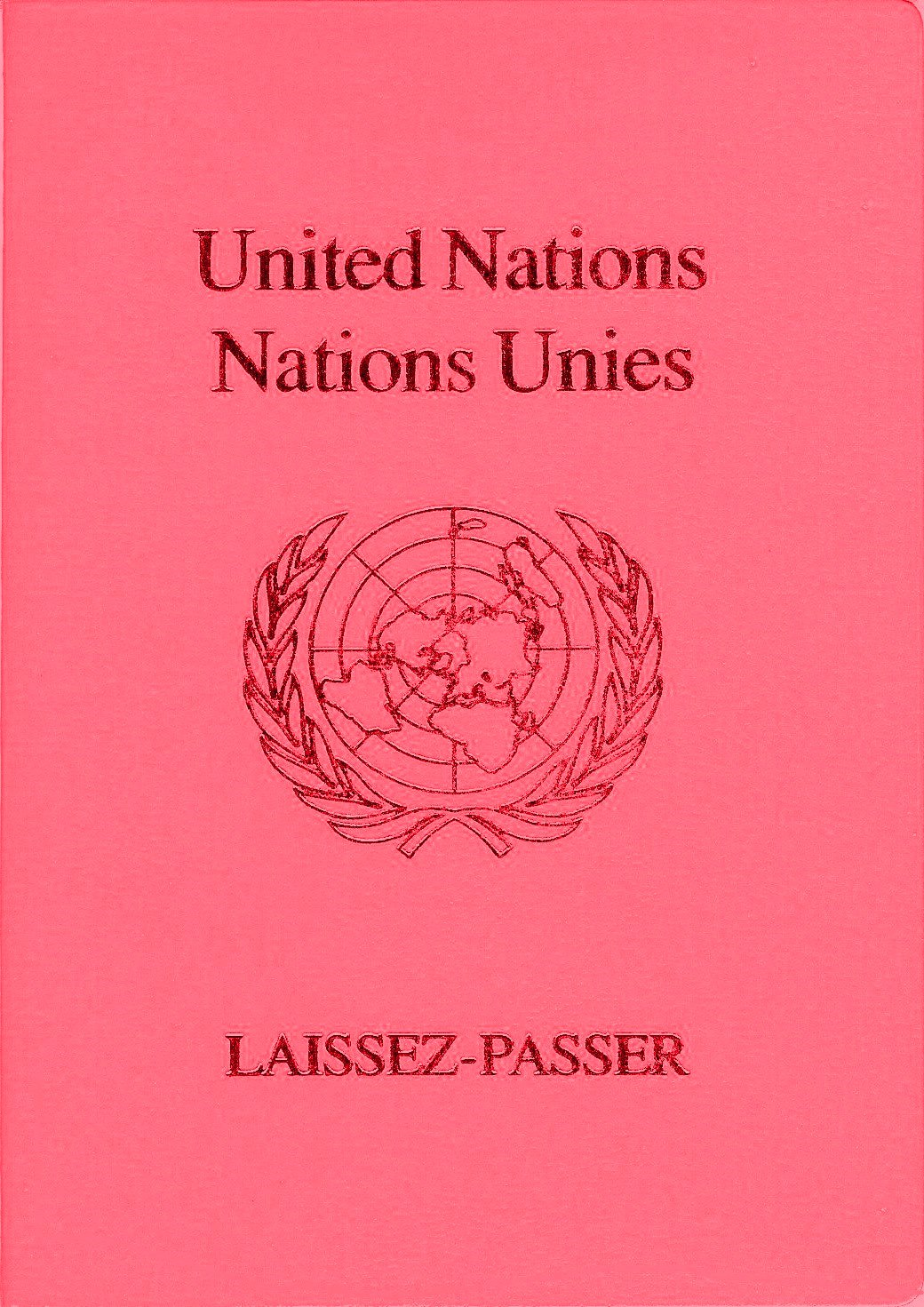
- The front cover of a red machine-readable United Nations laissez-passer.
- Type: Laissez-passer
- Issued by: United Nations
- Purpose: Identification
- Eligibility: High UN officials and Directors of the United Nations Specialized Agencies and the IAEA
- Size: 88 mm × 125 mm (3.5 in × 4.9 in)

A United Nations laissez-passer (UNLP or LP) is a diplomatic travel document issued by the United Nations under the provisions of Article VII of the 1946 Convention on the Privileges and Immunities of the United Nations in its offices in New York City and Geneva, as well as by the International Labour Organization (ILO).

The UNLP is issued to UN and ILO staff as well as staff members of international organizations such as the WHO, the IAEA, the World Tourism Organization, the Comprehensive Nuclear-Test-Ban Treaty Organization Preparatory Commission, the Organisation for the Prohibition of Chemical Weapons, the World Trade Organization, the International Monetary Fund, the International Organization for Migration, the World Intellectual Property Organization and the World Bank. The document is written in English and French, working languages of the United Nations.

The UNLP is a valid travel document, which can be used like a national passport (in connection with travel on official missions only).

Most officials hold a blue UNLP (up to D-1 level), which is similar in legal status to a service passport. A red UNLP is issued to particularly high officials (D-2 (Note: For example, the Assistant Secretary-General of the United Nations or a Deputy Director-General in a United Nations Specialized Agency.) and above (Note: This includes the Under-Secretary-General of the United Nations, the Director-Generals of the United Nations Specialized Agencies, the Deputy Secretary-General of the United Nations, and the Secretary-General of the United Nations.)), and confers similar status to that of a diplomatic passport holder.

== Name and signature page ==
A data page has a visual zone and a machine-readable zone. The visual zone has a photograph of the holder, data about the passport, and data about the LP holder much similar to a normal passport. The nationality and place of birth of the passport holder is not mentioned in a UNLP, but the UN is used in fields similar to issuing country.

- Photograph
- Type [of document, which is "LP" for "laissez-passer"]
- Code [of the issuing organization, which is "UNO" for "United Nations Organization" or "UNA" for "United Nations Agency"
- Laissez-passer Number
- Surname
- Given Name(s)
- Title [Job Title]
- Date of Birth
- Sex
- Official of [UNO/UNA for United Nations Organization/Agency]
- Date of Issue
- Date of Expiry
- Authority [United Nations/Nations Unies followed by the code of the issuing city, e.g. GVA for Geneva]
- Signature (on the opposite page)

The first line of a machine-readable zone (which is at the bottom of the page) of the passport contains a letter to denote the type of travel document (which despite the laissez-passer status, it is "P" for passport), followed by the code normally used for the citizenship of the passport holder (but here: "UNO/UNA" for "United Nations Organization/Agency"), and the name (surname first, then given name or names) of the passport holder. When visa are placed in a UNLP, the same practice should be followed, and in the nationality field, UNO/UNA should be placed. This guideline however is often not observed.

== e-UNLP ==
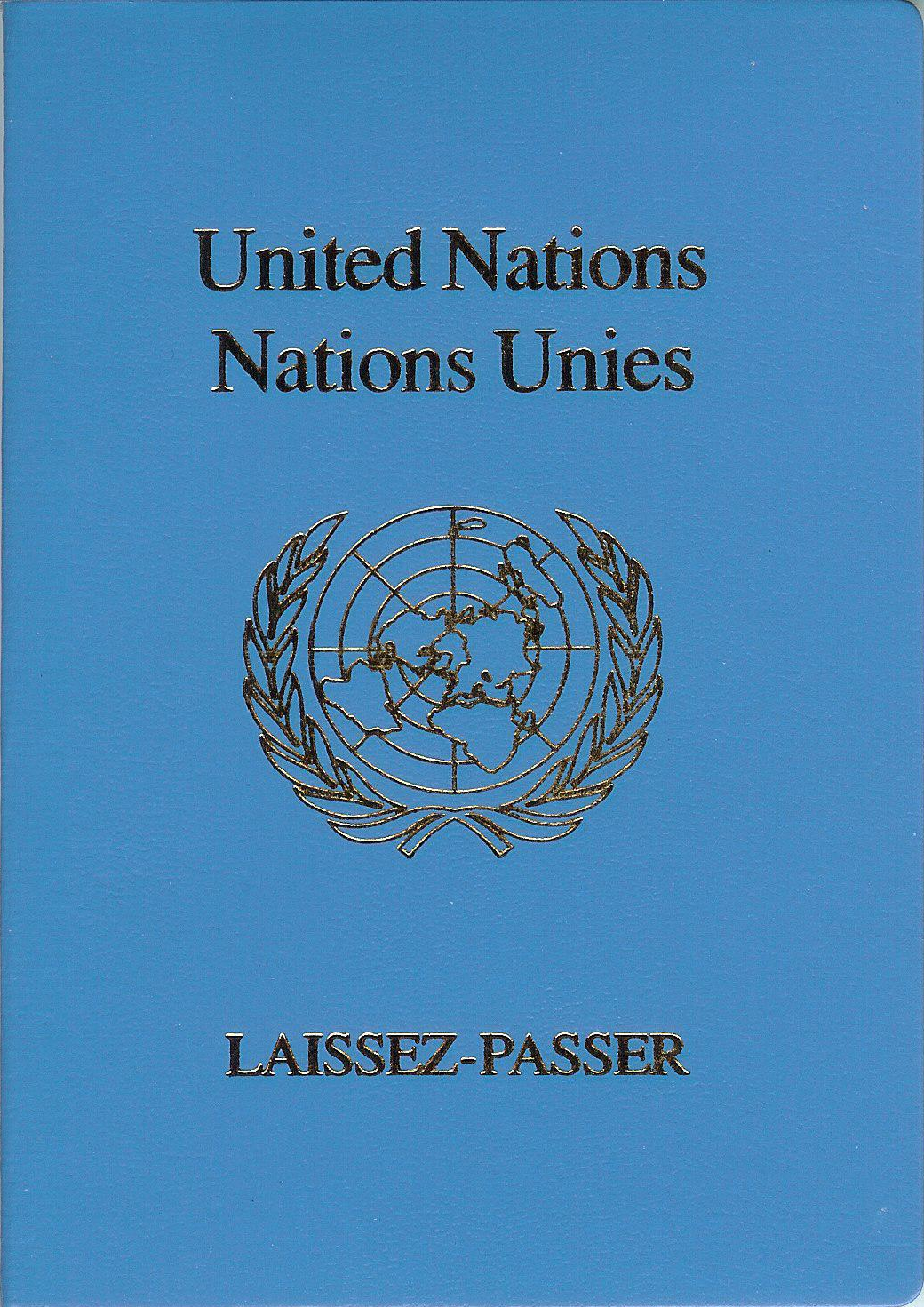
Former machine readable Laissez-Passer

Effective 3 September 2012, all applicants for new LPs received by the UN Office in Geneva (UNOG) will be issued the new "e-UNLPs" and there will be no renewal of current UNLPs. The new "e-UNLP" is fully compliant with international standards established by the International Civil Aviation Organization (ICAO). These include the use of bio-chip technology, facial recognition identification and employs strict photographic standards for passport documents. All "e-UNLPS" will be issued with a five-year fixed duration, regardless of contract expiration and will not contain dependents. The validity period of the new e-UNLP cannot be extended and additional visa pages cannot be added. Existing LPs retain the validity date stipulated in the document.

== Persons not entitled to a laissez-passer ==
Some categories of persons employed by or affiliated with the United Nations are not normally entitled to receive a laissez-passer, e.g.: goodwill ambassadors, Messengers of Peace, consultants of United Nations organizations and funds and programmes, experts on missions for the United Nations, and individual and institutional contractors.

However, in accordance with section 22 of the Convention on the Privileges and Immunities of the United Nations, individuals who are designated as experts on missions for the UN may be issued a United Nations Certificate, which is not a legal travel document but serves to certify that the holder is travelling on official business on behalf of the UN or specialized agency or related organization.

== See also ==
- European Union laissez-passer
- Interpol Travel Document
