= Convention on the Privileges and Immunities of the United Nations =

U.N. General Convention

General Convention
- Signed: 13 February 1946
- Location: New York City, United States
- Effective: 17 September 1946
- Condition: 1 ratification
- Ratifiers: 162
- Depositary: Secretary-General of the United Nations
- Languages: French and English

The Convention on the Privileges and Immunities of the United Nations is a Convention passed by the United Nations General Assembly on 13 February 1946 in New York. It is sometimes referred to as the New York Convention. It defines numerous issues relating to the status of the United Nations, its assets, and officials, in terms of the privileges and immunities that must be granted to them by its member states. As of February 2016, it has been ratified by 162 of the 193 UN member states.

On 21 November 1947, the Convention on Privileges and Immunities of the Specialized Agencies was adopted by GA resolution 179(II) to extend similar privileges to the specialized agencies of the UN. A total of 131 states are party to this second convention, with the notable absence of the United States.

== Key provisions ==
- Establishes juridical personality of the UN (Art. I)
- UN premises shall be inviolable, and UN property shall be immune from search, requisition, confiscation etc. (Art. II)
- UN shall be exempt from taxes and customs duties as well as prohibitions and restrictions on imports and exports (Art. II)
- Diplomatic immunity of communications and mail (pouch) (Art. III)
- Functional immunity of delegates (Art. IV), officials (Art. V) and experts (Art. VI)
- Recognition of United Nations Laissez-Passer (Art. VII)

The conventions are in force "with regard to each State which has deposited an instrument of accession with the Secretary-General of the United Nations as from the date of its deposit", i.e. not merely by a state's membership in the UN. Twenty-three states have accepted the conventions only with some reservations.
