= United Nations Security Council Resolution 1547 =

UN Security Council Resolution 1547
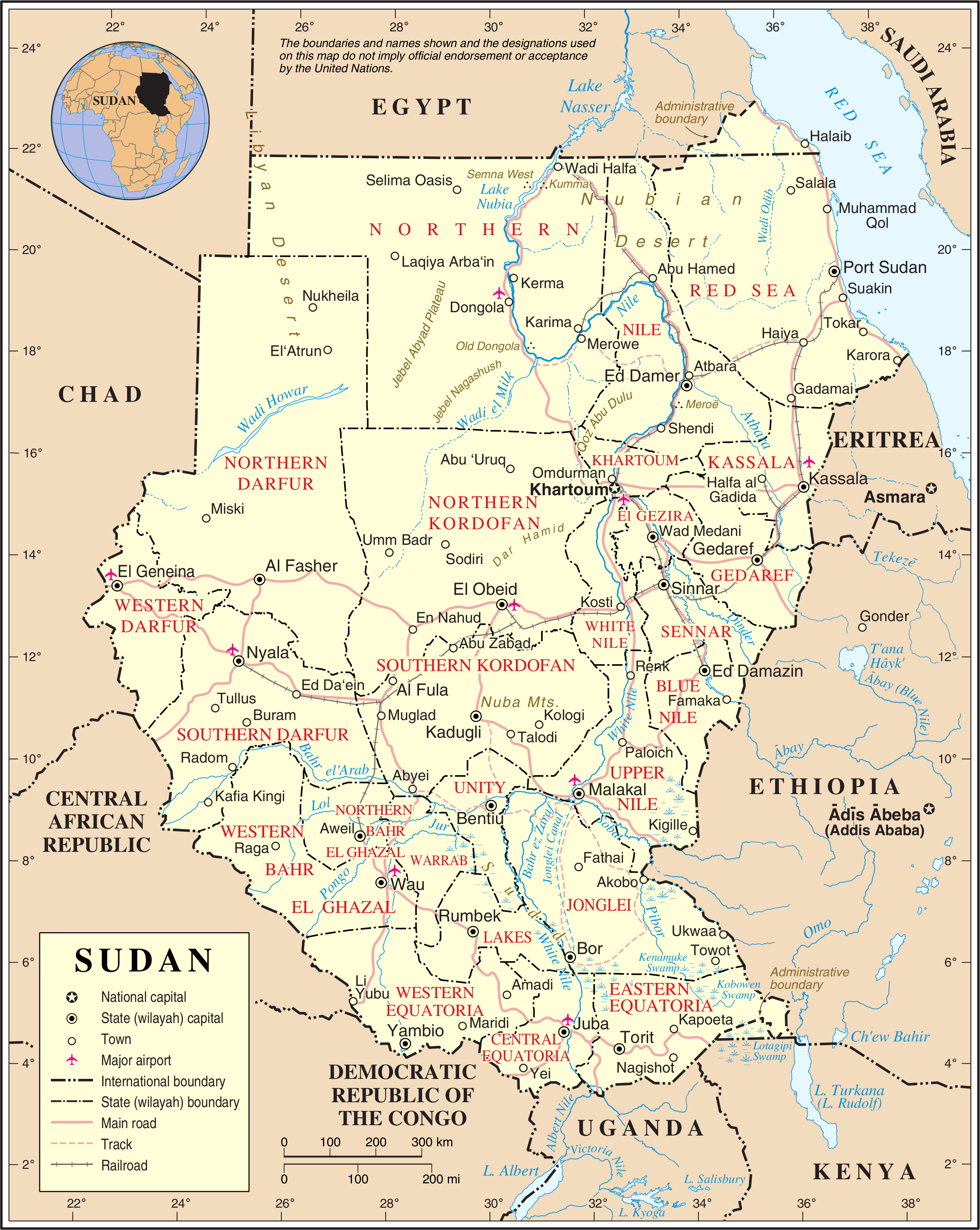
- Sudan
- Date: 11 June 2004
- Meeting no.: 4,988
- Code: S/RES/1547 (Document)
- Subject: The situation in Sudan
- Voting summary: 15 voted for; None voted against; None abstained
- Result: Adopted

Security Council composition
- Permanent members: China; France; Russia; United Kingdom; United States
- Non-permanent members: Algeria; Angola; Benin; Brazil; Chile; Germany; Pakistan; Philippines; Romania; Spain

United Nations Security Council resolution 1547, adopted unanimously on 11 June 2004, after welcoming the commitment of the Sudanese government and Sudan People's Liberation Army/Movement (SPLA/M) to work towards a full ceasefire and peace agreement to end the Second Sudanese Civil War, the council established a United Nations Advance Team in Sudan to prepare for a future United Nations operation following the signing of the Comprehensive Peace Agreement. The brief reference to the situation in the Darfur region divided Council members, with Algeria, China and Pakistan against a mention of Darfur and the other two-thirds of the council supporting its inclusion.

The Security Council praised the work of the Intergovernmental Authority on Development and others for their role in the peace process. It urged the parties involved to speedily conclude a peace agreement, and condemned all violations of human rights and international humanitarian law and acts of violence. There was concern at the humanitarian impact of the situation on the civilian population of Sudan.

The resolution created an advance team, under the leadership of the Special Representative of the Secretary-General, for an initial period of three months to facilitate contacts between the parties and provide support after the signing of the Comprehensive Peace Agreement. At the same time, the council intended to establish a support operation to facilitate the implementation of the peace agreement, and requested the Secretary-General Kofi Annan to submit recommendations on its composition and mandate and to prepare for its deployment.

The council also emphasised the importance of an effective public information capacity through radio, television and newspapers in order to promote the peace process and the role of the United Nations. It urged both parties to bring an end to the violence in the Darfur region, the Upper Nile and other areas.

== See also ==
- African Union – United Nations Hybrid Operation in Darfur
- List of United Nations Security Council Resolutions 1501 to 1600 (2003–2005)
- Southern Sudan
- United Nations Mission in Sudan
- War in Darfur
