= United Nations Security Council Resolution 1556 =

UN Security Council Resolution 1556
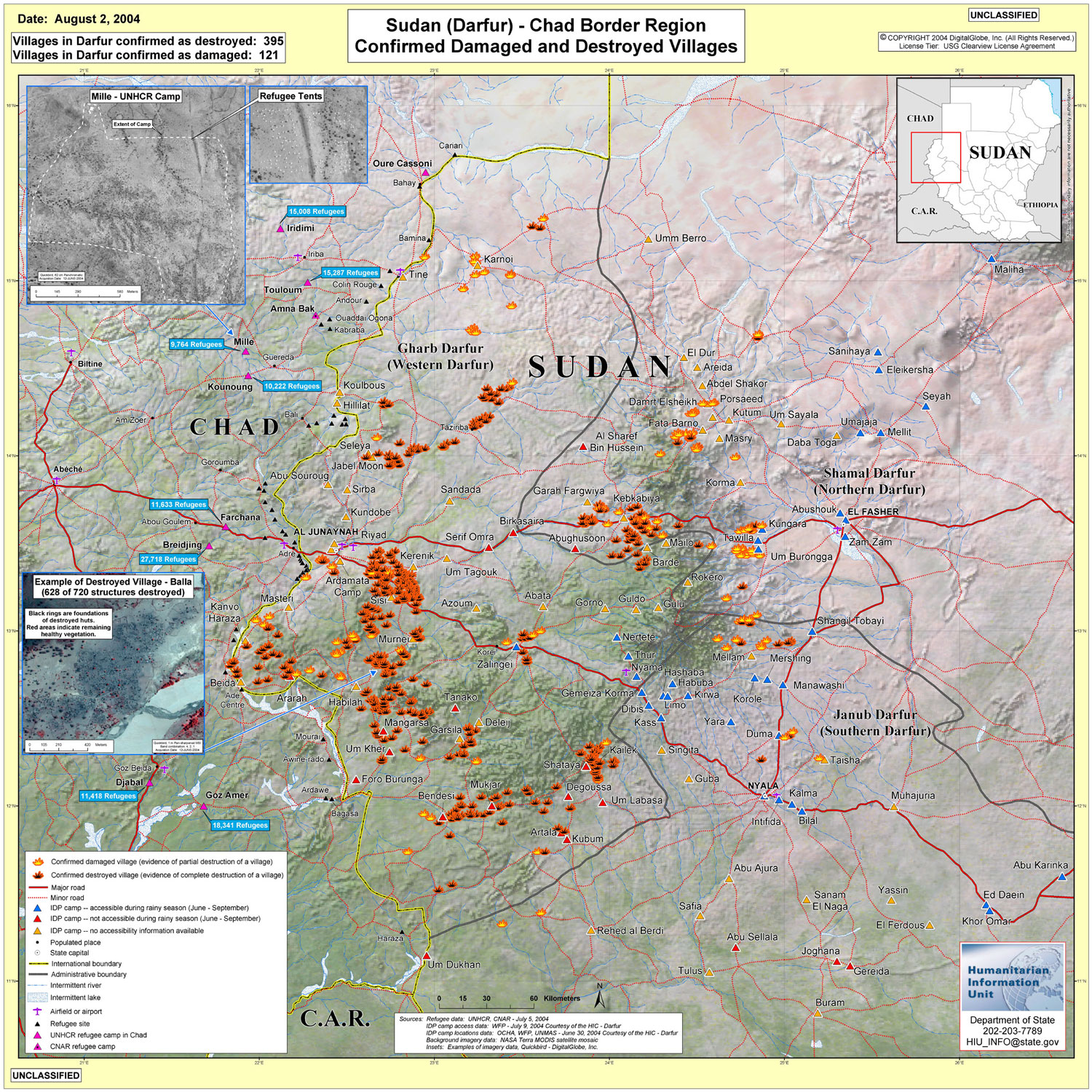
- Destroyed villages in Darfur, Sudan (2004)
- Date: 30 July 2004
- Meeting no.: 5,015
- Code: S/RES/1556 (Document)
- Subject: The situation in Sudan
- Voting summary: 13 voted for; None voted against; 2 abstained
- Result: Adopted

Security Council composition
- Permanent members: China; France; Russia; United Kingdom; United States
- Non-permanent members: Algeria; Angola; Benin; Brazil; Chile; Germany; Pakistan; Philippines; Romania; Spain

United Nations Security Council resolution 1556, adopted on 30 July 2004, after recalling resolutions 1502 (2003) and 1547 (2004) on the situation in Sudan, the council demanded that the Sudanese government disarm the Janjaweed militia and bring to justice those who had committed violations of human rights and international humanitarian law in Darfur.

The resolution, the first of its kind to address the war in Darfur, was approved by 13 council members, while China and Pakistan abstained. China said some measures included in the text of the resolution were "unhelpful", and Pakistan argued the final text lacked the "necessary balance".

== Resolution ==
=== Observations ===
The security council remained concerned about the humanitarian crisis and human rights abuses, including attacks on civilians which put thousands of lives at risk. It condemned such abuses by all parties involved in the conflict, particularly forced displacements, rapes and ethnic violence carried out by the Janjaweed against civilians. The council noted that the Sudanese government had promised to investigate the violence, prosecute those responsible and disarm the Janjaweed.

The preamble of the resolution also welcomed the leadership of the African Union, and a joint communiqué issued by the Sudanese government and Secretary-General Kofi Annan on 3 July 2004. It recalled that over one million people were in need of urgent humanitarian aid, and 200,000 people had fled into neighbouring Chad increasing pressure on that country. The Council determined that the situation constituted a threat to international peace and security.

=== Acts ===
Acting under Chapter VII of the United Nations Charter, the council called upon the Sudanese government to fulfil its commitments made in the communiqué, including lifting restrictions on the delivery of humanitarian assistance, to co-operate with an independent investigation into human rights violations, and to resume dialogue with dissident groups in Darfur, particularly the Justice and Equality Movement (JEM) and Sudan Liberation Movement/Army (SLM/A). Meanwhile, it endorsed the deployment of observers by the African Union to the Darfur region. Parties to the N’Djamena Ceasefire Agreement in April 2004 were urged to work towards an agreement and rebels were urged to respect the ceasefire and engage in peace talks.

The resolution demanded that Sudan disarm the Janjaweed and bring their leaders to trial, threatening further measures in the event of non-compliance by the Sudanese government. At the same time, an arms embargo was imposed on groups operating in North Darfur, West Darfur and South Darfur, including the Janjaweed, which would be reviewed if the council determined that Sudan had complied with its demands. The embargo would not apply to United Nations or humanitarian personnel, and human rights observers.

The international community was urged to provide humanitarian assistance to Darfur and Chad. Finally, the mandate of an advance mission established in Resolution 1547 was extended by 90 days until 10 December 2004.

== See also ==
- African Union – United Nations Hybrid Operation in Darfur
- Chad–Sudan relations
- List of United Nations Security Council Resolutions 1501 to 1600 (2003–2005)
- Southern Sudan
- United Nations Mission in Sudan
- War in Darfur
