= Bibliography of the War in Darfur =

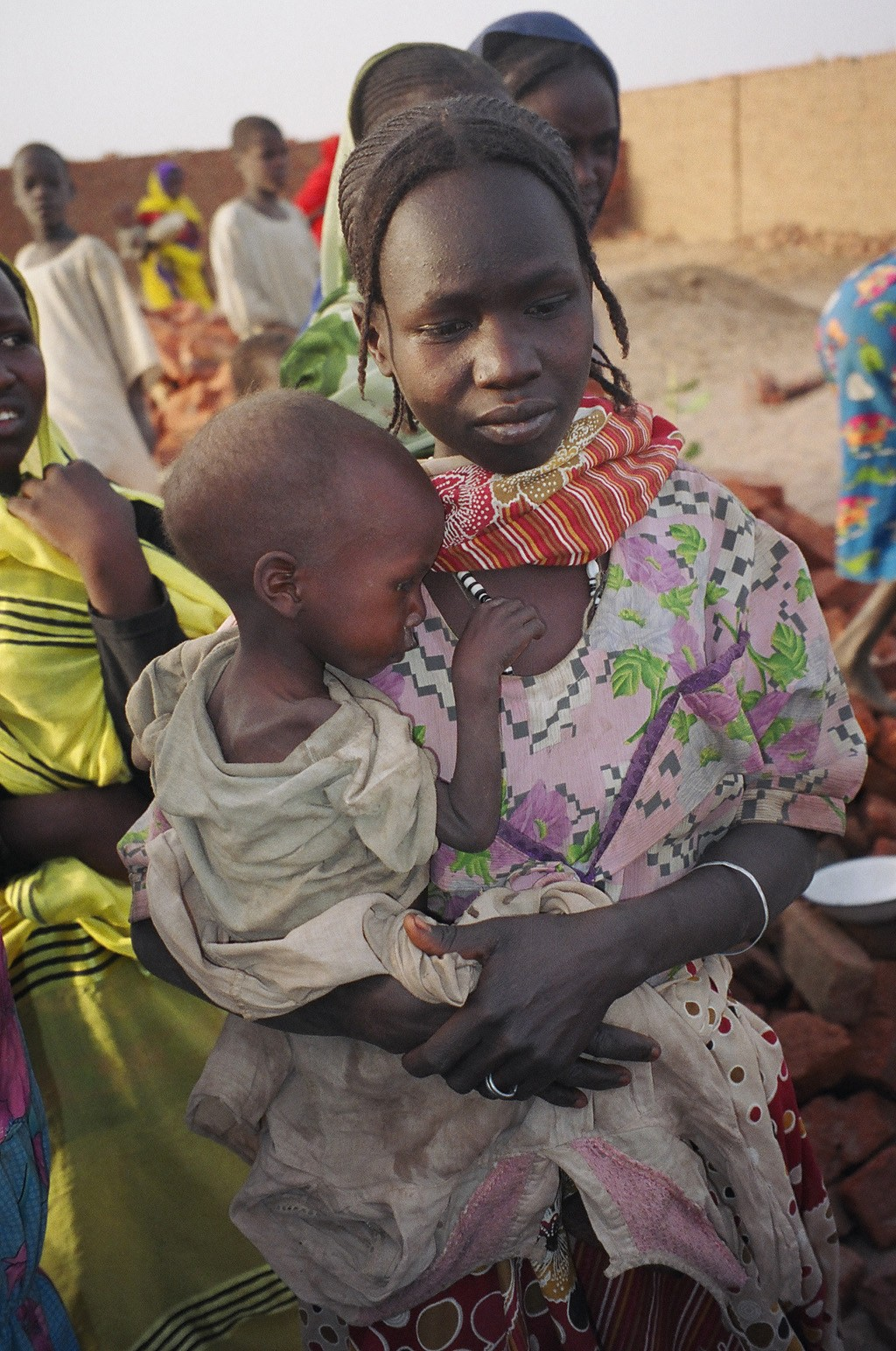
An internally displaced mother and malnourished child in North Darfur

This is the bibliography and reference section for the Darfur conflict series. External links to reports, news articles and other sources of information may also be found below.

== Maps ==
- Darfur Humanitarian Emergency: Satellite Imagery from USAID
- Reference maps of Sudan from ReliefWeb, including many conflict maps from Darfur
- Sudan Maps from the Perry–Castañeda Library Map Collection, includes both maps and USAID imagery
- Crisis in Darfur imagery in Google Earth provided by the US Holocaust Memorial Museum

== Published works ==
=== Books ===
- Burr, J. Millard and Robert O. Collins (2006) Darfur: The Long Road to Disaster, Markus Wiener, Princeton N.J., ISBN 1-55876-405-4
- Cheadle, Don and Prendergast, John (2007) Not on Our Watch: the mission to end genocide in Darfur and beyond Hyperion, New York, ISBN 1-4013-0335-8
- Daly, M.W. (2007) Darfur's Sorrow: A History of Destruction and Genocide, Cambridge University Press, ISBN 0-521-69962-2
- de Waal, Alex (1989) Famine that Kills: Darfur, Sudan, Oxford University Press, New York, (Revised 2005) ISBN 0-19-518163-8
- de Waal, Alex (editor) (2007) War in Darfur and the Search for Peace, Harvard University Press, ISBN 978-0-674-02367-3
- Flint, Julie and Alex de Waal (2006) Darfur: A Short History of a Long War, Zed Books, London, ISBN 1-84277-697-5
- Grzyb, Amanda (ed.) (2009) The World and Darfur: International Response to Crimes Against Humanity in Western Sudan, McGill-Queen's University Press, ISBN 978-0-7735-3535-0
- Hari, Daoud (2008) The Translator: A Tribesman's Memoir of Darfur. New York: Random House, ISBN 978-1-4000-6744-2
- Hassan, Salah M. and Ray, Carina E. (editors) (2009) Darfur and the Crisis of Governance in Sudan: a critical reader Cornell University Press, Ithaca, New York, ISBN 978-0-8014-7594-8
- Hoile, David (2005) Darfur in Perspective (Revised 2006) European-Sudanese Public Affairs Council, London, ISBN 1-903545-40-4
- Johnson, Douglas H. (2003) The Root Causes of Sudan's Civil Wars, Indiana University Press, ISBN 0-253-21584-6
- Mamdani, Mahmood (2009) Saviors and Survivors: Darfur, Politics, and the War on Terror Pantheon, New York, ISBN 978-0-307-37723-4
- Prunier, Gérard (2005) Darfur: The Ambiguous Genocide, Cornell University Press, ISBN 0-8014-4450-0
- Steidle, Brian and Steidle Wallace, Gretchen (2007) The Devil Came on Horseback: Bearing Witness to the Genocide in Darfur , PublicAffairs, ISBN 978-1-58648-474-3
- Srinivasan, Sharath (2021) When Peace Kills Politics: International Intervention and Unending Wars in the Sudans, Hurst & Co/Oxford University Press ISBN 9780197602720
- Totten, Samuel and Markusen, Eric (2006) Genocide in Darfur: Investigating the Atrocities in the Sudan Routledge, New York, ISBN 0-415-95328-6
- Totten, Samuel (2012). An Oral and Documentary History of the Darfur Genocide. Santa Barbara, CA: Praeger Security International. (ISBN 0313352356; ISBN 978-0313352355)

=== Articles ===
- Campbell, David (2007) "Geopolitics and visuality: sighting the Darfur conflict" Political Geography 26: pp. 357–382,
- Degomme, Olivier and Debarati Guha-Sapir (2010) "Patterns of mortality rates in Darfur conflict" The Lancet 375(9711): pp. 294–300, doi:10.1016/S0140-6736(09)61967-X, abstract
- Ejibunu, Hassan Tai (2008) "Sudan Darfur Region's Crisis: Formula for Ultimate Solution" EPU Research Papers Issue 09/08
- Elliesie, Hatem; Behrendt, Urs and Niway Zergie Aynalem (2009) "Different Approaches to Genocide Trials under National Jurisdiction on the African Continent: The Rwandan, Ethiopian and Sudanese Cases" In: Recht in Afrika / Law in Africa / Droit en Afrique R. Köppe, Cologne, Germany, pp. 21–67, ISBN 978-3-89645-804-9
- Elliesie, Hatem (2010) "Sudan under the Constraints of (International) Human Rights Law and Humanitarian Law: The Case of Darfur" In: Elliesie, Hatem (editor) (2010) Beiträge zum Islamischen Recht VII: Islam und Menschenrechte / Islam and Human Rights / al-islam wa-huquq al-insan P. Lang, Frankfurt a.M. pp. 193–218, ISBN 978-3-631-57848-3
- Jafari, Jamal and Paul Williams (2005) "Word Games: The UN and Genocide in Darfur" JURIST
- Srinivasan, Sharath (2013) "Negotiating Violence: Sudan's Peacemakers and the War in Darfur" African Affairs DOI: 10.1093/afraf/adt072

== Feature films ==
- All About Darfur (2005)
- The Art of Flight (2005)
- Darfur Diaries: Message from Home (2006)
- The Devil Came on Horseback (2007)
- Google Darfur (2007)
- Darfur Now (2007)
- Sand and Sorrow (2007)
- They Turned Our Desert Into Fire (2007)

== Overviews and updating news aggregators ==
- "Sudan", UN News Centre
- Darfur Information Center of the University of Pennsylvania African Studies Center
- Sudan page of the United States Agency for International Development
- Hague Justice Portal: Situation in Darfur
- Radio Dabanga
- Sudan Update--The Peoples of Darfur—Background of the Darfur Conflict—Chronology 1983-1995

From mainstream media

- "In Depth - Sudan: A Nation Divided" by BBC News
- "Special Report: Sudan" by Guardian Unlimited
- "The Darfur Crisis" by The NewsHour, Public Broadcasting Service
- "Full Coverage: Sudan" from Yahoo! News
- The Darfur Tragedy interactive from The Washington Post
- Crisis briefing on Darfur by Reuters AlertNet

From advocacy organizations

- "Sudan: Crisis in Darfur", Amnesty International reports
- The Darfur Conflict, Crimes of War Project
- Crisis in Darfur, International Crisis Group
- "Crisis in Darfur", Human Rights Watch

On specialized topics

- "Darfur" - Legal News Archive from JURIST
- Aggregated information on media censorship in Sudan from the International Freedom of Expression Exchange
- Sudan on Diplomacy Monitor
- Genocide & Crimes Against Humanity - a learning resource, highlighting the cases of Myanmar, Bosnia, the DRC, and Darfur

== Blogs, podcasts and websites of individuals ==
- Mia Farrow, articles and blog on Darfur issues
- Jan Pronk, blog of the UN special envoy to Sudan
- Ryan Spencer Reed, Documentary photographic traveling exhibitions - Sudan: The Cost of Silence
- Eric Reeves, Sudan Research, Analysis, and Advocacy
- Brian Steidle, article and photos taken as an African Union observer in 2004
- Voices on Genocide Prevention, podcasts from the United States Holocaust Memorial Museum (not specific to Darfur)
- How to Fetch Firewood, a much-published poem dedicated to the women and children of Darfur; podcast

== Reports and news articles (chronological) ==
- Pulitzer Center on Crisis Reporting Video Reports on the Conflict in Darfur
- Darfur: "too many people killed for no reason.", Amnesty International, 3 February 2004
- "Darfur Rising: Sudan's New Crisis", International Crisis Group, 25 March 2004
- Notes from Natsios: Sudan's Growing Crisis (PDF), USAID newsletter FrontLines, April–May 2004 issue
- Alex de Waal, "Counter-Insurgency on the Cheap", London Review of Books, August 5, 2004
- Mikael Nabati, "The U.N. Responds to the Crisis in Darfur: Security Council Resolution 1556", ASIL Insight 142, American Society of International Law, August 2004
- Genocide in Sudan, Parliamentary Brief, UK, August 2004
- Documenting Atrocities in Darfur, United States Department of State, September 2004
- Alex de Waal, "Tragedy in Darfur", Boston Review, October/November 2004
- "Report of the International Commission of Inquiry on Darfur to the United Nations Secretary-General" on reliefweb.int, 25 January 2005
- Alex Cobham, Causes of Conflicts in Sudan, Testing the Black Book, January 2005
- Paul Reynolds, "Sudan atrocities strain US relations", BBC News, 1 February 2005
- " Painful legacy of Darfur's horrors: Children born of rape", International Herald Tribune, 12 February 2005
- "Darfur: no peace without justice", Darfur Relief and Documentation Center (DRDC), 21 February 2005
- "ICC given Darfur suspect names", Al Jazeera, 5 April 2005
- Darfur: Counting the Deaths - Mortality Estimates from Multiple Survey Data, Centre for Research on the Epidemiology of Disasters, 26 May 2005
- Jane Wells, "Witness to Darfur" five-part series, The Huffington Post, June 2005
- "UN refused access to Darfur to investigate atrocities", BBC News, 13 December 2005
- Dorina Bekoe, "Overcoming Obstacles to Humanitarian Assistance in Darfur", US Institute of Peace, January 2006
- "The Best Hope for Peace in Darfur", panel discussion recorded at the New York Society for Ethical Culture (RAM and MP3 formats), April 19, 2006
- "Crisis Zone: Darfur, Sudan", Canadian Broadcasting Corporation, 24 May 2006
- Darfur Report, African Holocaust, June 2006
- "Darfur's Fragile Peace Agreement", International Crisis Group, 20 June 2006
- Alex de Waal, "Darfur's fragile peace", opendemocracy.net, 5 July 2006
  - Gérard Prunier, "Darfur's Sudan problem", opendemocracy.net, 15 September 2006 (in response to de Waal's article)
- Jonah Fisher, "Cracks emerge in Darfur peace deal", BBC News From Our Correspondent, 29 July 2006
- Paul Reynolds, "Despair over Darfur", BBC News, 6 September 2006
- "A Tale of Two Genocides: The Failed U.S. Response to Rwanda and Darfur", Africa Action, 9 September 2006
- "SUDAN: Rebel fragmentation hampers Darfur peace", IRIN, 11 September 2006
- Jonah Fisher, "No end in sight to Darfur troubles", BBC News, 18 September 2006
- Sharath Srinivasan, "Minority Rights, Early Warning and Conflict Prevention: Lessons from Darfur", Minority Rights Group, September 2006
- Karen Allen, "Q&A: Your questions about Darfur", BBC News, 13 October 2006
- "Searching for Jacob", 60 Minutes, 22 October 2006
- "Our Choice, Too: On the Edge in Darfur" (video) from the Pulitzer Center on Crisis Reporting, 2006
- "Q&A on the Darfur conflict", BBC News, updated 27 February 2007
- "France and USA push Darfur action", HIRAM7 REVIEW, 25 June 2007
- R. Green, "Reacations in the Sudanese Press to the Darfur Rebel Attack on Omdurman", Middle East Media Research Institute, 9 July 2008
- R. Green, "Controversy in the Arab World Over ICC Indictment of Sudan President Al-Bashir", Middle East Media Research Institute, 24 July 2008
- Measuring the Drowned and the Saved in Sudan, Michael Deibert, 28 June 2009, Social Science Research Council

== Advocacy organizations and websites (alphabetical) ==
- 24 hours For Darfur
  - website
- Aegis Trust
  - Protect Darfur campaign website
- American Jewish World Service
  - Darfur Action Campaign website
- Amnesty International (USA section) website
- Bystanders to Genocide website
- Canadian Students For Darfur, website
- Damanga: Coalition for Freedom and Democracy, website
- Darfur Relief and Documentation Center
- Darfur Foundation, website
  - The Darfur Wall, website
- Darfur is Dying, website
- David Blaine
  - Dunk for Darfur campaign
- The Darfur Store
- Genocide Intervention Network, website
  - Darfur Scorecard campaign
  - Sudan Divestment Task Force website
- Globe for Darfur
  - Sound the Alarm campaign
  - Blue Hat campaign
- Google Darfur
- HAeD - Hatzilu et Amei Darfur (Save the Nations of Darfur) website
- Help Darfur Now
- Hold Your Breath for Darfur
- Human Rights First
  - HOPE (Help Organize a Peace Envoy) for Darfur campaign
- Kids for Kids
- LifeNets.net
- Operation Sudan
- Res Publica (Organization)
  - DarfurGenocide.org
- Save Darfur Coalition, website
- Sauver Le Darfour, SLD, a European anti-genocide coalition,
- STAND: A Student Anti-Genocide Coalition, website
  - Time to Protect campaign
  - DarfurFast campaign
- ProjectDarfur.com
- STAND Canada
- SudanActivism.com
- Sudan: The Passion of the Present
- Support American Intervention Now (SAIN) in Darfur
  - Committee on Conscience Alert - Sudan:Darfur Overview
- Unitarian Universalist Service Committee
  - Drumbeat for Darfur campaign

== Humanitarian and emergency relief work ==
- Humanitarian Information Center for Darfur, United Nations
- "Who's Working: Sudan", List of aid organizations from ReliefWeb, United Nations Office for the Coordination of Humanitarian Affairs
- "Darfur Without Delay" (with video) about AmeriCares efforts in Darfur
- Emergency Feeding in Darfur, slideshow by Samaritan's Purse
- Safer Access Statement on State of Humanitarian Security in Darfur A Collective Response on Darfur is Needed

== Parties to the conflict ==
- African Union Mission in Sudan: African Union website with updates on the peacekeeping force currently in Darfur
- United Nations African Union Mission in Darfur (UNAMID): United Nations page on UN/AU hybrid peacekeeping force, approved by United Nations Security Council Resolution 1706
- Justice and Equality Movement: Website
- National Redemption Front: Founding document
- Sudan Liberation Army (Minni Minnawi)
- Janjaweed
- Government of Sudan: Website (in Arabic)
- Sudanese Embassy in the United States: Website
- Massaleit Community in Exile: Website
