= Olympic Dream for Darfur =

Olympic Dream for Darfur is an organization and campaign to pressure the Government of the People's Republic of China to intervene on the side of civilians in the Darfur conflict. It claims that the Chinese government has the requisite influence to pressure the Sudanese government to accept international police into its country, although China disputes this. The methods of the campaign are alternative torch relays and boycotts intended to disrupt the 2008 Summer Olympics.

== Goals ==
The Olympic Dream for Darfur is based in New York and headed by Hollywood actress and U.N. Goodwill Ambassador Mia Farrow. The organization was founded by Farrow, Sudan expert Eric Reeves, and campaign director Jill Savitt. The goals of the campaign and organization are the new deployment of an African Union and United Nations peace force, and the disarmament of Janjaweed militias. Olympic Dream for Darfur says that because China supplies oil and arms to Darfur and has extensive economic interests there, that China could influence the Sudanese government to accept an international police force to halt violence in Darfur.

The Chinese government's position is that the Darfur problem is very important to China; that China is making real efforts to bring the Sudanese government and the international community together to resolve the issue; that drawing a connection between Darfur and China, and drawing a connection between Darfur and the Olympics, do not help to resolve the issue; and that the actions of the campaign are contrary to the Olympic spirit and a violation of the principle of non-politicisation of the Olympic Games.

== Methods ==
Olympic Dream for Darfur organizes torch relays to sway public opinion towards pressuring China to use its influence in the Darfur conflict. In May 2008, Olympic Dream for Darfur lead an unofficial torch relay in Hong Kong at the same time as the official Olympic torch relay. Hollywood actress and Dream for Darfur chairwoman Mia Farrow delivered a speech calling on world leaders to boycott the 2008 Summer Olympics opening ceremony and criticizing the corporate sponsors of the Olympics for not pressuring China on Darfur. A Coca-Cola spokesperson responded by pledging $5 million for assistance in Darfur. In addition to Hong Kong, she has staged torch relays in Rwanda, Germany, Armenia and Cambodia. An alternative torch relay in the United States was staged by Dream for Darfur with the Save Darfur Coalition and STAND: A Student Anti-Genocide Coalition.

== See also ==
- Team Darfur
- Genocide Intervention Network
