= The Darfur Wall =

The Darfur Wall is a non-profit web site that raises awareness of the Darfur conflict and supports Darfur-relief organizations. It displays a list of numbers from 1 to 400,000, each representing one person killed in Darfur. Visitors can change the color of a number from gray to white by donating one dollar or more.

One hundred percent of the proceeds from The Darfur Wall benefit four non-profit organizations:

- Doctors Without Borders
- Save the Children
- Sudan Aid Fund / Eric Reeves
- Save Darfur Coalition

The Darfur Wall received its first donation on November 15, 2006. In the next month the project raised more than $10,000 (U.S.). As of March 2009, more than 20% of the wall has been lit, representing donations of over $90,000.
