= Daoud Hari =

Daoud Hari (a.k.a. Suleyman Abakar Moussa) was born a Sudanese tribesman in the Darfur region of Sudan. He has worked as a language interpreter and guide for NGOs and the press on fact-finding trips into the war-torn and dangerous Darfur area. In August 2006, he along with US journalist Paul Salopek and their Chadian driver were captured and detained by Sudanese government agents under suspicion of espionage, and released more than a month later. After going into exile in the US, Hari wrote a memoir about life in Darfur, called The Translator: A Tribesman's Memoir of Darfur.

== Life and career ==
After escaping an assault on his village, Hari entered the refugee camps in neighboring Chad and began serving as a translator for major news organizations, as well as for UN agencies and other aid groups. He now lives in the United States, and was part of Save Darfur Coalition’s “Voices from Darfur” tour.

In August 2006, Hari was captured and detained by the government of Sudan under suspicion of being a spy, along with Pulitzer Prize–winning journalist Paul Salopek and their Chadian driver Abdulraham Anu (a.k.a. "Ali"). During their months-long ordeal, all three men were severely beaten and deprived. The American journalist knew that the Sudanese government did not want to risk more bad publicity on his death, and so eventually all three were released. Upon their successful release - after an international outcry from US diplomats, the US military, Irish musician Bono and even the Pope - Hari then moved to the US, where he began work on his book to help bring further attention to the plight of his people and country. In 2008, he published his account under the title The Translator: A Tribesman's Memoir of Darfur.

Alongside his humanitarian work, Dauod Hari is best known for his book The Translator, that was translated into several languages. In the introduction, Hari wrote that his purpose for this work was to elicit the aid of the rest of the world's community. He stated that when "they [humans] understand the situation, they will do what they can to steer the world back to kindness." He also dedicated this work to the displaced Darfurians who he says, "need to go home", as well as to the women and girls of Darfur.

Throughout this book, Hari tries to compare the lives of the people of Darfur to those of the rest of the world. He highlights that his childhood was "full of happy adventures, such as yours was". He also compares the young girls of Darfur to the young girls of the rest of the world. Daoud stated in an interview with his publisher, Random House, that he hopes that through his work, "Americans will learn that the people of Darfur are in many ways are just like them." His efforts to relate the lives of the victims of the genocide are meant to aid in humanizing them in the eyes of the rest of the world.

Hari is also known as Suleyman Abakar Moussa. As he explains in his memoir, this is a false identity he created to appear as a citizen of Chad in order to work in the refugee camps for Sudanese in Chad as an interpreter (by Chad law, only Chadian citizens are allowed to work, and refugees may not work even for free as of 2008).

== See also ==
- Bibliography of the War in Darfur
- Lost Boys of the Sudan
- Sudanese literature

== Bibliography ==
- The Translator: A Tribesman's Memoir of Darfur. New York: Random House, March 18, 2008. ISBN 978-1-4000-6744-2
