= Team Darfur =

Team Darfur was an international association of athletes devoted to raising awareness of humanitarian crises related to War in Darfur. It is among the many organizations that consider that war to involve genocide.

Team Darfur attracted greater attention in the run-up to the 2008 Summer Olympics, because the Olympics were located in China, a country widely criticized for its economic involvement in Darfur.

In particular, Team Darfur criticized China's economic and diplomatic support for the Sudanese government headed by Omar al-Bashir. Al-Bashir currently faces genocide charges in the International Criminal Court, which accuses him of masterminding attempts to wipe out African tribes in Darfur with a campaign of murder, rape and deportation carried out using Janjaweed fighters. For its part, China's stated policy in Sudan is to participate in international peacekeeping and diplomatic efforts while having "respect for [Sudan's] sovereignty and territorial integrity" and encouraging economic development .

Team Darfur attempted to exert pressure on the Chinese government by associating the Beijing Olympics with China's involvement in Darfur.

On August 6, 2008, China revoked the entrance visa of American former speed skater and inline speed skater Joey Cheek, Team Darfur's president and co-founder, hours before he was scheduled to leave for Beijing. Cheek was not competing in the 2008 Summer Olympics, but had planned attend the games in support of Team Darfur.

== See also ==
- Olympic Dream for Darfur
