= Joey Cheek =

American speed skater

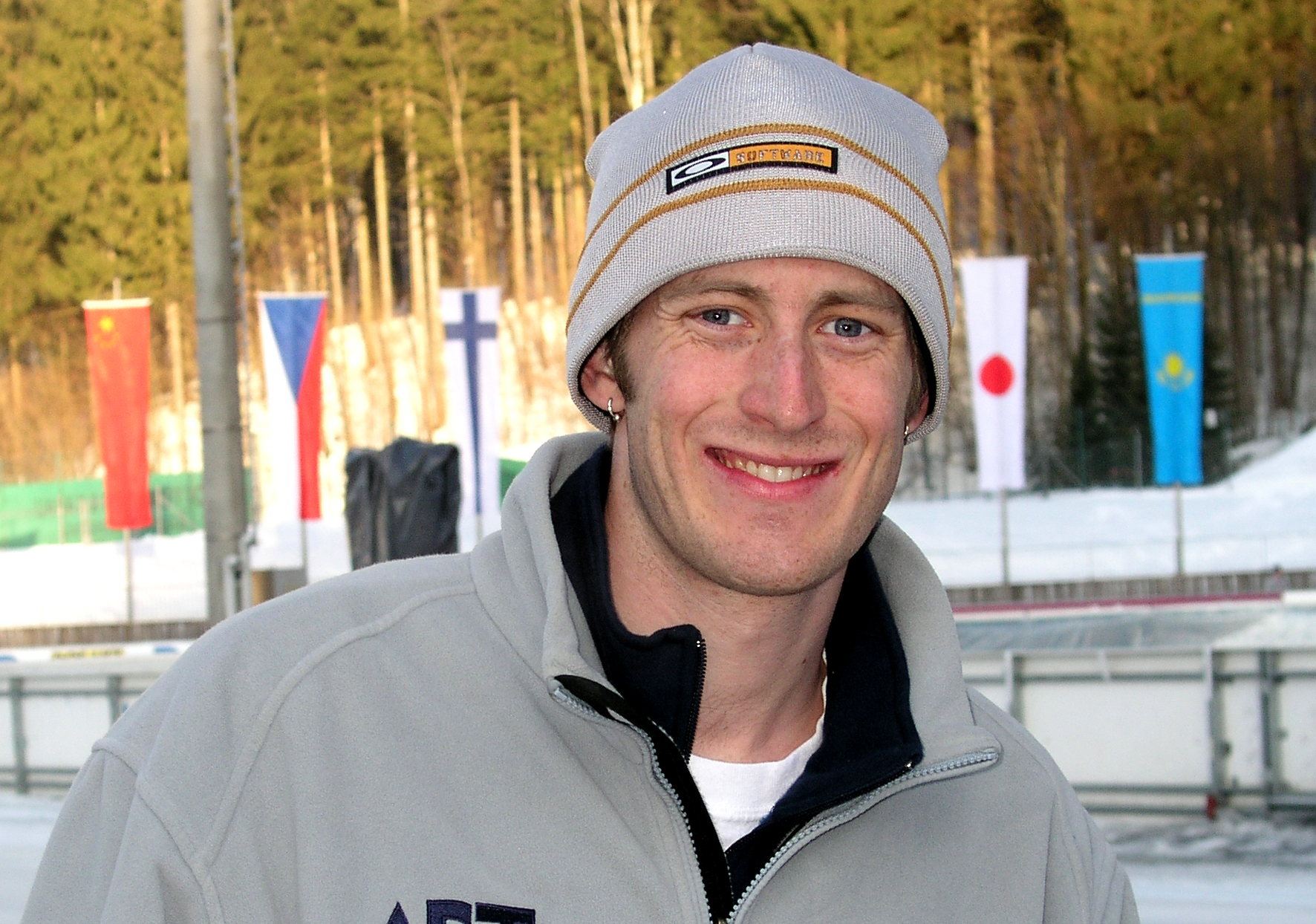

Personal information
- Full name: William Joseph N. Cheek
- Born: June 22, 1979 (age 47) Greensboro, North Carolina, U.S.
- Education: Princeton University
- Height: 6 ft 3 in (191 cm)
- Weight: 174 lb (79 kg)
- Spouse: Tamara Jenkins
- Children: 1

Sport
- Country: United States
- Sport: Speed skating
- Retired: 2006
Medal record
Men's speed skating
Representing the United States
Olympic Games
Gold medal – first place	2006 Turin	500 m
Silver medal – second place	2006 Turin	1000 m
Bronze medal – third place	2002 Salt Lake City	1000 m
World Sprint Championships
Gold medal – first place	2006 Heerenveen	Sprint
Bronze medal – third place	2005 Salt Lake City	Sprint
World Single Distance Championships
Bronze medal – third place	2003 Berlin	1000 m
Bronze medal – third place	2003 Berlin	1500 m

William Joseph Cheek (born June 22, 1979) is an American former speed skater and inline speed skater. He specialized in the short and middle distances and won Olympic gold in 2006. As of 2024, he is the Executive Vice President of Entrepreneurship for the Greensboro Chamber of Commerce.

== Personal life ==
Joey Cheek was born on June 22, 1979, in Greensboro, North Carolina. He picked up speed skating after meeting and watching neighborhood friend Bryan Anderson skate around the neighborhood training for Nationals. After years of skating with Bryan, his brother, and other Piedmont Triad skaters, he switched to ice speed skating. He did this by attending a "from wheels to ice" class in Alaska.

Cheek attended James B. Dudley High School in Greensboro, North Carolina, and graduated from Princeton University as a member of the class of 2011, where he studied economics and the Chinese language.

Prior to 2019, he was a media entrepreneur.

== Accomplishments ==
Cheek's breakthrough was in the 2002 Winter Olympics in Salt Lake City, where he won the bronze medal in the 1,000 meters.

In 2003 he won a bronze medal at the World Single Distance Championships in Berlin in the 1,000- and 1,500-meter events. Both distances at that tournament were won by Dutch speed skater Erben Wennemars. In 2005, Cheek made the podium for the first time in the World Sprint Championships, again behind Wennemars.

On January 22, 2006, in Heerenveen, Cheek became world sprint champion. On aggregate he beat Dmitry Dorofeyev of Russia and Jan Bos of the Netherlands.

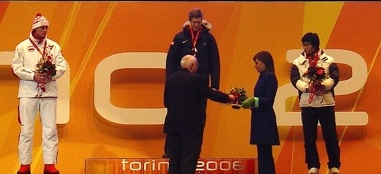
2006 Winter Olympics Speed Skating 500 metres Medal Ceremony. Cheek is pictured center, on top of the podium.

At the 2006 Winter Olympics in Turin, Italy, Cheek won the men's 500-meter event in dominating style, recording a two-run total time of 1:09.76. That time was 0.65 seconds faster than runner-up Dorofeyev, and Cheek was the only competitor to break the 35-second mark in the competition, doing so in both of his runs (34.82 and 34.94). He went on to win silver in the 1,000-meter race, finishing just behind teammate Shani Davis.

Cheek was elected by his teammates to carry the US flag into the closing ceremonies. Near the end of NBC's coverage of the event, commentator Bob Costas noted that Cheek's application to Harvard University had not been accepted and lobbied the Dean of Admissions to reconsider the decision. Cheek has since graduated from Princeton University. At Princeton, Cheek was a member of the Ivy Club.

Cheek planned to attend the Beijing 2008 Olympic Games in support of athletes on Team Darfur. His visa was revoked by the Chinese embassy hours before he intended to leave for China.

Personal records
Men's speed skating
Event	Result	Date	Location	Notes
500 m	34.66	2001-12-19	Salt Lake City, Utah	
1000 m	1:07.29	2001-12-18	Salt Lake City, Utah	
1500 m	1:44.98	2004-12-21	Salt Lake City, Utah	
3000 m	3:54.76	1999-11-26	Calgary, Canada	
5000 m	6:42.57	1999-11-28	Calgary, Canada	
10000 m	14:13.81	2000-01-16	Calgary, Canada	

== Philanthropy ==
Cheek was the co-founder and president of Team Darfur, an international coalition of athletes committed to raising awareness about and bringing an end to the crisis in Darfur, Sudan.

At a press conference after the Olympic 500-meter race, Cheek said that he decided to donate his USOC gold medal bonus ($25,000) to Right to Play, an athlete-driven international humanitarian organization formed by former Olympic champion Johann Olav Koss of Norway. Cheek challenged others to make similar pledges to the organization. He subsequently donated his prize money from the 1,000-meter race ($15,000) to the same organization.

Since his donation, others joined in and over $390,000 has been contributed to this cause.
