= Fredrik Wesslau =

Swedish-American diplomat

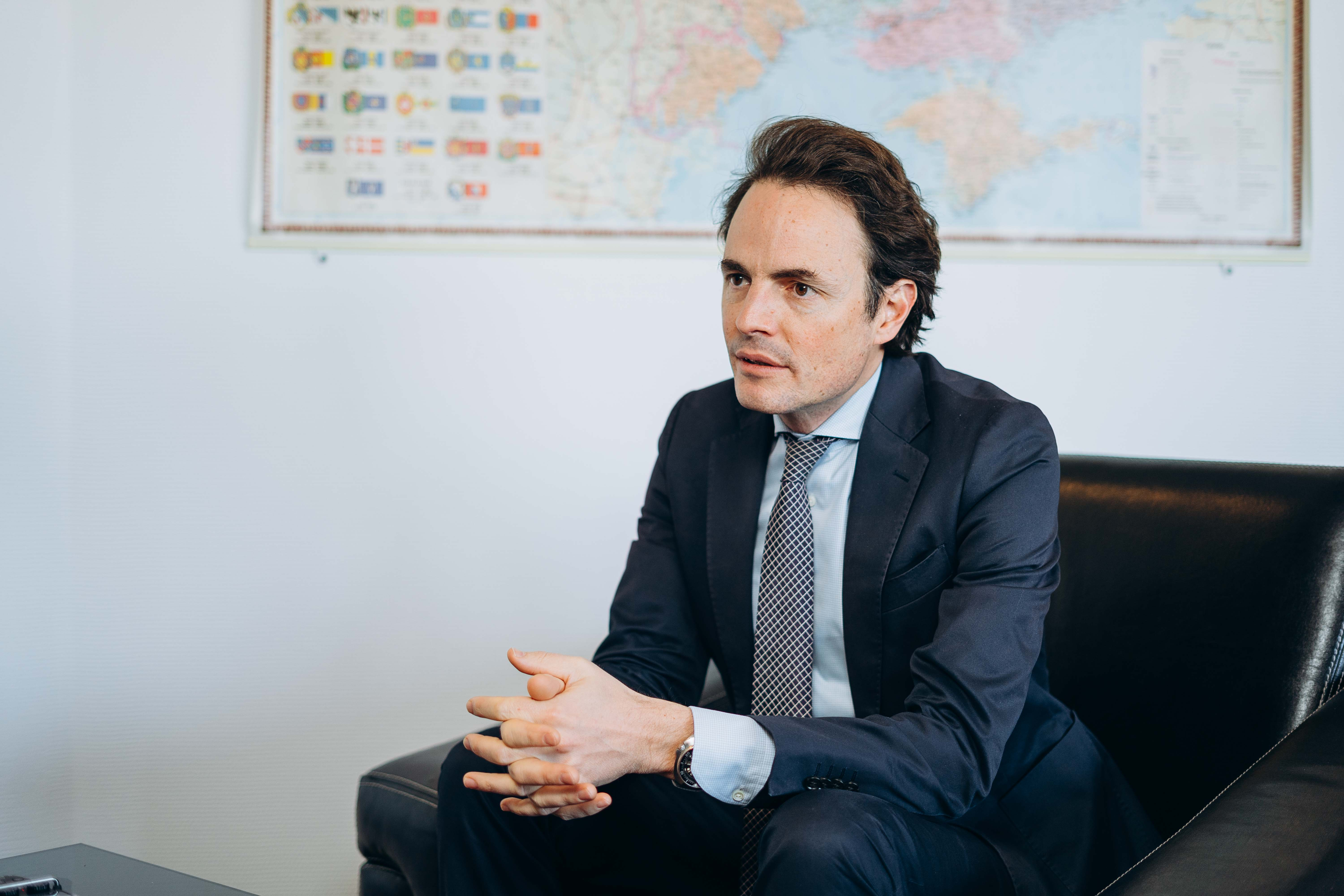

Personal details
- Born: July 5, 1976 (age 50) Tokyo, Japan
- Citizenship: Sweden
- Occupation: Diplomat and foreign policy expert

Fredrik Wesslau is a diplomat and foreign policy expert specialising in conflict resolution and post-conflict stabilisation. He is currently a Senior Policy Fellow at the European Council on Foreign Relations and has held a number of senior diplomatic positions. Wesslau is a frequent commentator of European security issues, notably Russia’s war against Ukraine.

== Biography ==
Originally from Sweden, Wesslau has worked in various diplomatic roles for the United Nations, European Union, and Organization for Security and Co-operation in Europe on the conflicts such as Kosovo, Georgia, Nagorno-Karabakh, and Sudan/South Sudan. His most recent post was as Deputy Head of Mission for the European Union Advisory Mission in Ukraine between 2018 and 2023. This included working in Ukraine during the first year of Russia’s full-scale invasion of Ukraine.

== Think tank and civil society roles ==
Wesslau founded the European Policy Institute in Kyiv (EPIK) in 2026, the first international think tank to be established in Ukraine during war time, and was its first director. He has been a Distinguished Policy Fellow at the Stockholm Centre for Eastern European Studies between 2023 and 2026 and chairman of the board of The Reckoning Project from 2023 to 2025.

Before that, he worked as Director of the Wider Europe Programme at the European Council on Foreign Relations.

== Diplomatic roles ==
Wesslau has had multiple diplomatic roles focusing on international conflicts and crises. He served as a team leader and political adviser to the EU counter-piracy mission, EUCAP Nestor. He has also worked adviser to the EUSR for Sudan and South Sudan, Rosalind Marsden, on the peace negotiations between the two countries following the South's independence in 2011. He has also worked as Political Adviser to the EUSR for the South Caucasus 2008–2010 and as Special Adviser to the UN SRSG for Kosovo, Joachim Rücker, in the run-up to Kosovo's Declaration of Independence in 2008.

== Journalism and publications ==
Wesslau began his career as a journalist, writing mainly for the International Herald Tribune.

In May 2013, his book - The Political Adviser's Handbook - was published. The Handbook is a field manual for political advisers and political affairs officers working on conflict resolution and crisis management. It is being used in key international institutions such as the UN, NATO, OSCE, and EU, as well as several foreign ministries and universities.

He has written for Foreign Policy, Politico, The New York Times, Newsweek, Kyiv Post, Dagens Industri, and Svenska Dagbladet, as well as appeared frequently on radio and television, including Sveriges Radio, Sveriges Television, France 24, and BBC.

Wesslau holds two master's degrees from Sciences Po Paris and the School of International and Public Affairs at Columbia University, and Bachelor of Sciences in international relations from the London School of Economics.
