= Genocide Intervention Network =

Nonprofit organization

Genocide Intervention Network logo

The Genocide Intervention Network (or GI-NET) was a non-profit organization aiming to "empower individuals and communities with the tools to prevent and stop genocide". Founded in 2004, in 2005 the Genocide Intervention Fund changed its name to Genocide Intervention Network, and in 2011, it merged with the Save Darfur Coalition to form a new organization, United to End Genocide.

== History ==
In October 2004, two Swarthmore College students, Mark Hanis and Andrew Sniderman, established the Genocide Intervention Network in hopes of empowering citizens to protect civilians from the atrocities occurring in Darfur. GI-Net's mission and policy goals were greatly influenced by the "Responsibility to Protect" doctrine, drafted by the International Commission on Intervention and State Sovereignty, in order to create a permanent anti-genocide grassroots movement.

In 2011, GI-Net and the Save Darfur Coalition merged to establish United to End Genocide.

=== Supporting the African Mission in Sudan ===
Mark Hanis, Andrew Sniderman, Sam Bell, Cara Angelotta, Susannah Gund, Janessa Calvo-Friedman, Rita Kamani, Elisabeth Jaquette and others wanted the genocide in Sudan to be treated as a security issue, not as a humanitarian disaster, and did so by directly supporting the African Union Mission in Sudan (AMIS), an underfunded peacekeeping force.

GI-Net's controversial idea of supporting military force for foreign intervention attracted the attention of Gayle Smith, who had two decades of experience in Africa and had been the senior director of African Affairs in Clinton's National Security Council. Smith provided the first positive interest in GI-Net's work. Smith helped GI-Net raise over $300,000 to support AMIS.

After several disagreements on how to organize the fundraising money, GI-Net, in collaboration with the African Union, funded the Africa Humanitarian Action to support patrols that would protect displaced women, who put themselves at risk of rape when they left the internally displaced persons camps to collect firewood in order to prepare food. The program was canceled due to a lack of additional support and financial resources.

=== The Divestment Movement ===
In 2006, GI-Net looked for new methods to increase economic pressure on the Sudanese government. However, after the U.S. government had already maxed out the economic sanctions it could apply alone, GI-Net increased its involvement in the divestment campaign that had begun on Harvard's college campus in 2004.

The goal behind the divestment campaign was simple: to engage students to pressure their universities to withdraw investments providing revenue to Sudanese government. This financial support allowed the Sudanese government to expand on their military assets.

By April 2005, the student activism prompted college officials to change its investment policies. Harvard University declared that it would withdraw support in China National Petroleum Corporation, a business partner of the Sudanese government. Companies in the oil industry were the perfect target for divestment since oil is an essential source of revenue for the government, but is an industry that provides little benefit or relief to Sudanese civilians.

By September 2006, the divestment movement grew substantially and adopted larger goals. The group eventually became known as the Sudan Divestment Task Force, which drafted legislation to influence state legislatures around the United States to divest.

Feeling pressured by the U.S.-based advocacy campaign, the Khartoum spent close to a million dollars on an eight-page spread in the New York Times encouraging companies to invest in Sudan, a country with "peaceful, prosperous and democratic future".

=== Dream for Darfur ===
As the official Olympic torch made its way around the world prior to the beginning of the 2008 Summer Olympics, the Olympic Dream for Darfur team, a campaign to bring mass attention to the conflict in Darfur, began its own symbolic relay. The Dream for Darfur team had one and only goal: to convince China that the continuation of the Olympic Games in Beijing was at risk unless it withdrew support for Sudan's regime. Genocide survivors joined the relay led by Mia Farrow and traveled to Rwanda, Armenia, Germany, Bosnia, Herzegovina, and Cambodia.

This led to the formation of a U.S.-based relay in September 2007. Jill Savitt and Mia Farrow organized and led the event, supported by GI-Net, the Save Darfur Coalition, and the Enough Project.

The mission of the Dream for Darfur team was to break down the foreign policy information into digestible form, so that citizens, without the background to understand the complexities of the international policy-making process, could become involved in the anti-genocide campaign.

The Dream for Darfur team encouraged the major sponsors of the Olympic Games, such as McDonald's, Anheuser-Busch, Microsoft, and Volkswagen to privately meet with Chinese officials to raise concern over affairs in Darfur. Eventually, the team encouraged Steven Spielberg to resign as creative consultant for the opening ceremonies.

=== Rebranding and reorganizing ===
In 2005, the organization changed its name from Genocide Intervention Fund to its current name, Genocide Intervention Network. GI-Net was publicly re-launched on April 6, 2005. GI-Net immediately broadened its efforts by introducing a membership and chapter program in order to educate and mobilize support for U.S. policies that could assist victims in Darfur. In 2011, the Save Darfur Coalition and GI-Net merged to create United to End Genocide. The organization's president is Tom Andrews.

== Advocacy programs ==
=== Carl Wilkens Fellowship ===
GI-Net launched a program to build an engaged and permanent anti-genocide community. Named in honor of Carl Wilkens—the only American to remain in Rwanda during the genocide in 1994—the "Wilkens Fellowship" was a selective year-long program that exposed individuals to vital tools and resources in hopes of building permanent peaceful communities throughout the world.

The program terminated in 2012 due to financial constraints.

=== STAND: A Student Anti-Genocide Coalition ===
In 2004, a group of Georgetown University students created a campus community organization that focuses on genocide prevention. The program gained national recognition, and now colleges and universities across the United States host STAND chapters.

STAND emerged as a grassroots-based campaign that networks students who are committed to ending crimes against humanity around the world. Since its debut, STAND developed as a key component in the anti-genocide movement alongside its previous parent organizations: the Genocide Intervention Network, which merged into United to End Genocide. In 2012, STAND became an independent organization, entirely student-run.

=== Sudan Divestment Task Force/Conflict Risk Network ===
Two college students co-founded the Sudan Divestment Task Force (SDTF) in 2005. The Task Force launched successful divestment campaigns around the world targeting university endowments, asset managers and city, state, and national investment policies. As a result of the Task Force efforts, twenty-two states, dozens of universities, eleven cities and fifteen countries adopted Sudan divestment policies. SDTF worked closely with Genocide Intervention Network, and in 2006 became part of GI-NET under the leadership of Adam Sterling, an original co-founder. The Sudan Divestment Task Force led to the enactment of the Sudan Accountability and Divestment Act (SADA) on December 31, 2007.

As part of the campaign, the University of California, Brown, Amherst, Princeton, the University of Vermont, and the University of Washington are encouraging companies not to provide financial support to the Sudanese government. Instead, financial aid is given directly to the victims of the genocide.

In 2009, SDTF became the Conflict Risk Network (CRN). Drawing upon successes in corporate engagement and the lessons learned from the Sudan divestment movement, the CRN calls on corporate actors to take steps towards responsible actions including acts that support peace and stability in areas affected by genocide and mass atrocities.

== See also ==
- Darfur conflict
- STAND: A Student Anti-Genocide Coalition
