= Google Darfur =

- DVD Cover for Google Darfur
- Directed by: Robert Simental-Ruybe
- Written by: Robert Simental-Ruybe
- Produced by: Robert Simental-Ruybe; Barbara Jester
- Distributed by: FilmBaby.com (DVD)
- Release date: October 9, 2007
- Running time: 97 minutes
- Country: United States
- Language: English

Google Darfur is a 2007 documentary film directed by Robert Simental-Ruybe. The film exposes dangerous conditions such as rape and violence in Eastern Chad for refugees living in the camps and major inefficiencies of the camp management. Google Darfur was submitted into evidence in the International Criminal Court (ICC) case against Sudanese President Omar Bashir.

== Development ==
The documentary was shot on HD video in Eastern Chad in early 2007, and independently released to DVD in the United States on October 9, 2007, via FilmBaby. The documentary was shot in several towns and refugee camps in Eastern Chad, including Gaga, Farchana, Adre, Breidjing and Abeche. The video crew consisted of director Robert Simental-Ruybe, cameraman Matt Bowen, translator Ahmed Borgoto and driver Zakaria Mahamat.

A 28-minute cut of the documentary was broadcast on Seattle Community Access Television by Indymedia on February 26, 2009, then subsequently on other IndyMedia partner stations.

A 2020 version of Google Darfur was produced and released for free on YouTube in April 2020, in order to reflect the changes on the ground after the 2019 ousting of president Omar al-Bashir.
