= Eric Reeves =

American academic (born 1950)

Eric Reeves (born 1950) is an US political scientist who is professor emeritus of English language and literature at Smith College in Northampton, Massachusetts. Reeves has carried out research into the politics and human rights situation in Sudan and campaigned against the Darfur genocide.

== Education and employment ==
Reeves received degrees in English Literature from Williams College and the University of Pennsylvania. He was recruited as a teacher at Smith College around 1978 or 1979.

== Sudan research and activism ==
Reeves started studying politics and human rights in Sudan in 1999. He testified several times before the United States Congress, has lectured widely in academic settings, and has served as a consultant to a number of human rights and humanitarian organizations operating in Sudan. Working independently, he wrote about several aspects of Sudan's early twenty-first century history, in particular the Darfur genocide, and the role of the Sudanese and Chinese governments in perpetuating it.

Reeves was active in advocating against the Darfur genocide. He was described as "a fierce critic" of former US President Barack Obama's policy of weakening sanctions against the Sudanese government.

Reeves received a grant from Humanity United (Redwood City, CA) to support his research and travel. A collection of his essays on ongoing war and human destruction in Darfur appeared as A Long Day's Dying (Key Publishing, 2007). He later published an eBook about five crucial years in the history of Sudan: Compromising with Evil: An archival history of greater Sudan, 2007 - 2012 (www.CompromisingWithEvil.org).

In 2024, Reeves was managing a project in Zamzam IDP camp in North Darfur, with a primary emphasis on assisting girls and women traumatized by genocidal sexual violence. The project also distributes food and medicine to the neediest and aims to rehabilitate water dysfunctioning water wells.

== Publications and awards ==
His work has appeared in The New York Times, The Washington Post, The Wall Street Journal, as well as numerous academic journals. This work has led to Reeves receiving a number of honorary degrees, and many other forms of national and international recognition.
