= Save Darfur Coalition =

Advocacy group based in Washington, D.C.

The Save Darfur Logo.

The Save Darfur Coalition was an advocacy group formed in 2004 that attempted to raise public awareness and mobilize a large response to the atrocities in Sudan's western region of Darfur. In Washington, D.C., a coalition of more than 190 religious, political, and human rights organizations campaigned to draw attention to and encourage policy responses regarding the atrocities of the War in Darfur, which had resulted in a humanitarian crisis. According to international estimates, 300,000 civilians died and 2.7 million people were displaced between 2003 and 2008.

== History ==
=== Founding ===
The Save Darfur Coalition was founded at the "Darfur Emergency Summit in New York City" on July 14, 2004. The Coalition began when the United States Holocaust Memorial Museum and American Jewish World Service organized the event at the CUNY Graduate Center in Manhattan, featuring Holocaust survivor and Nobel Peace Prize-laureate Elie Wiesel.

The coalition grew into an alliance of more than 190 religious, political, and human rights organizations committed to ending the alleged genocide in Darfur. Save Darfur was headquartered in Washington, D.C., with a staff of 30 professional organizers, policy advisors, and communications specialists.

The coalition's members initially signed on to the following unity statement:

"We stand together and unite our voices to raise public awareness and mobilize a massive response to the atrocities in Sudan's western region of Darfur. Responding to a rebellion in 2003, the regime of Sudanese President Omar al-Bashir and its allied militia, known as the Janjaweed, launched a campaign of destruction against the civilian population of ethnic groups identified with the rebels. They wiped out entire villages, destroyed food and water supplies, stole livestock, and systematically murdered, tortured, and raped civilians. The Sudanese government's genocidal, scorched earth campaign has claimed hundreds of thousands of lives through direct violence, disease, and starvation, and continues to destabilize the region. Millions have fled their homes and live in dangerous camps in Darfur, and hundreds of thousands are refugees in neighboring Chad. Violence continues today. Ultimately, the fate of the Darfuri people depends on establishing lasting and just peace in all of Sudan and in the region."

=== Dream for Darfur ===
The Olympic Dream for Darfur campaign, initiated in the lead-up to the 2008 Summer Olympics, aimed to draw attention to the conflict in Darfur and press China to reconsider its support for Sudan's regime. The campaign organized a symbolic relay, with genocide survivors and activists, including Mia Farrow, visiting various countries such as: Rwanda, Armenia, Germany, Bosnia and Herzegovina, and Cambodia.

In September 2007, a U.S.-based relay was launched, led by Jill Savitt and Mia Farrow, and supported by organizations like GI-Net, the Save Darfur Coalition, and the Enough Project. The primary goal was to make foreign policy information more accessible to citizens and engage them in the cause.

The Dream for Darfur team urged major Olympic Games sponsors, such as McDonald's, Anheuser-Busch, Microsoft, and Volkswagen, to privately engage with Chinese officials regarding their concerns about the situation in Darfur. The campaign's efforts also led to Steven Spielberg's decision to resign as the creative consultant for the opening ceremonies.

=== Merger ===
In 2011, in order to create a more effective and collective voice dedicated to preventing and eliminating genocidal violence, the Genocide Intervention Network and the Save Darfur Coalition merged to establish United to End Genocide. The merger created a large anti-genocide campaign that encompasses a membership base of over 800,000 global activists, a mass student movement, and a network of institutional investors with over $700 billion in assets.

== Advocacy programs ==
=== STAND ===
STAND (formerly known as Students Taking Action Now: Darfur) was founded in 2004 by students at Georgetown University as the student-led division of United to End Genocide. STAND opposes violence in Burma, the Democratic Republic of the Congo, Sudan, South Sudan, and Syria. In April 2015, STAND merged with the Aegis Trust.

=== Million Voices for Darfur ===
On January 22, 2006, the 55th anniversary of the ratification of the U.N.'s Convention on Genocide, the Save Darfur Coalition launched the campaign, Million Voices for Darfur, which involved the collation of uniformly worded postcards from citizen advocates across the country. The postcards insisted that President Bush support, "a stronger multinational force to protect the civilians of Darfur."

On June 29, 2006, six months after the start of the campaign, Bill Frist, the Senate Majority Leader at the time, and Senator Hillary Clinton, signed the 1,000,000th and 1,000,001st postcards.

The Million Voices program was the first example of the Save Darfur Coalition's attempt to influence the executive branch of the U.S. government to enact change.

=== Divest for Darfur ===
In order to exert financial pressure on the government of Sudan to change its policies, Save Darfur launched a divestment campaign, Divest for Darfur. The campaign was similar to Genocide Intervention Network's divestment project, The Sudan Divestment Task Force.

Divest for Darfur focused on using print and broadcast advertisements to target the "highest offending" companies that conducted business in Sudan, such as Fidelity Investments and Berkshire-Hathaway. Both companies heavily invested in PetroChina, whose revenue supported the Sudanese military.

Divest for Darfur's broadcast advertisements aired on CNN and were featured in such publications as The Hill, Roll Call, and the Washington Times. Besides creating general ads encouraging companies to divest in Sudan, the Save Darfur Coalition also directly called on the United States Senate to pass the Sudan Accountability and Divestment Act.

=== Save Darfur: Rally to Stop Genocide ===
On April 30, 2006, the Save Darfur Coalition organized the "Save Darfur: Rally to Stop Genocide" to occur at the National Mall in Washington, D.C., and encouraged other national communities to hold rallies of their own. Over 50,000 people gathered among prominent speakers, including Barack Obama, Elie Wiesel, Nancy Pelosi, George Clooney, Paul Rusesabagina, and Brian Steidle, to demand the withdrawal of any objection to a UN peacekeeping force, better humanitarian access to refugees, adherence to existing treaties and ceasefire agreements, and a commitment to a lasting peace agreement in the Abuja peace talks.

=== Tour for Darfur – Eyewitness to Genocide ===
Brian Steidle, former Marine Captain and observer to the African Union peacekeeping forces stationed in the Darfur region, toured the United States in 2006. The aim was to raise awareness of the humanitarian crisis in Darfur, as well as the actionable steps Americans could take to aid in the cause. The tour covered 21,000 miles and 20 different locations. It continued to promote the messages of other campaigns of the Save Darfur Coalition, such as the Million Voices for Darfur and the Save Darfur: Rally to Stop Genocide.

=== 1-800-GENOCIDE ===
1-800-GENOCIDE was a toll-free number that allowed individuals to voice their concerns about genocides and mass atrocities to their elected public officials.

=== DarfurScores.org ===
DarfurScores.org was a legislative scorecard system that graded the United States Congress and its representatives based on their acknowledgment of the issues in Darfur. The platform aimed to make legislative action on Darfur more transparent.

The initiative’s goal was to hold representatives accountable and to inform constituents, thereby applying pressure on government officials to instigate policy change.

=== Genocide Watch ===
Genocide Watch was the first human rights organization to declare the crimes in Darfur as genocide in April 1994. It sponsored a hearing on the crimes of Omar al-Bashir at the Church Center for the United Nations. The hearing was chaired by Wole Soyinka, a Nobel Prize-winning Nigerian writer. The prosecutor was Beth Van Schaack, who later became United States Ambassador-at-Large for Global Criminal Justice. The defense counsel was a Canadian law professor. The panel of judges convicted al-Bashir of crimes against humanity and genocide.

Genocide Watch then worked with Nick Rostow, the legal advisor to the US Mission to the United Nations, to draft UN Resolution 1593 to refer the situation in Darfur to the International Criminal Court. The resolution passed 13-0-2, with China and the USA abstaining. It was the first referral by the Security Council to the ICC and resulted in convictions of two persons for crimes against humanity in Darfur, as well as ICC charges of genocide against Omar al-Bashir in 2009, with additional charges in 2010.

== Endorsements ==
The Save Darfur Coalition had over 190 national and regional organizational supporters, including Amnesty International, Genocide Intervention Network, NAACP, Genocide Watch, United to End Genocide (which it later merged with) and Physicians for Human Rights.
