= War in Darfur =

Genocidal conflict in Western Sudan

- Part of the Sudanese Civil Wars and the Second Sudanese Civil War (until 2005)
- Justice and Equality Movement fighters
Date	26 February 2003 – 31 August 2020 (17 years, 6 months and 5 days)
Location	Darfur, Sudan
Result	Stalemate

Belligerents
SRF (Note: Known as the National Redemption Front prior to 2011.) (2006–2020); JEM (2003–2020); SLA (factions; 2003–2020); LJM (2010–11) (Note: Signed the Doha Darfur Peace Agreement in 2011.); SLA (factions); SARC (2014–2020); SLFA (2017–2020); SLA-Unity; SLMJ; JEM (Jali)	Sudan; SAF; PDF; RSF; Janjaweed; Chadian rebel groups; Anti-Gaddafi forces (2011)	(United Nations) UNAMID (2007–2020)

Commanders and leaders
Ahmed Diraige; Khalil Ibrahim †; Gibril Ibrahim; Abdul Wahid al-Nur (SLA-AW); Minni Minnawi (SLA-MM); Musa Hilal (POW) (SARC)	(Sudan) Abdel Fattah al-Burhan; (Sudan) Omar al-Bashir (until 11 Apr 2019); (Sudan) Musa Hilal (until 2017); (Sudan) Hamid Dawai; (Sudan) Ali Kushayb; (Sudan) Ahmed Haroun (until 11 Apr 2019); Hemedti; (Sudan) (Chad) Mohammed Nour Abdelkerim (Note: Although he was a Chadian rebel leader and head of an insurgent militia, Abdelkerim was so close to the Sudanese Armed Forces that he enlisted as an officer in the Popular Defence Forces, while his troops were temporarily organized as a pro-government militia. He and his militia left Sudan in 2005 to take part in the Chadian Civil War (2005–2010).)	(African Union) (United Nations) Martin Ihoeghian Uhomoibhi; (African Union) (United Nations) Frank Mushyo Kamanzi

Units involved
SLA; SLA-AW; SLA-MM; SLA-Second Revolution; SLA-Unity; JEM; Gibril Ibrahim faction; Abdallah Bishir Jali faction	Sudanese Armed Forces; Popular Defence Forces (until 11 Apr 2019); Rapid Support Forces; Janjaweed	No specific units

Strength
60,000; 35,000	109,300 (Note: Number does not represent the number of soldiers stationed in Darfur, but the total number of military personnel.); Unknown; 17,500; Janjaweed: <25,000	(United Nations) 15,845 soldiers and 3,403 police officers

Casualties and losses
Unknown	Unknown	295 killed
- Total killed: 300,000 (UN estimate); 10,000 (Sudanese government estimate); Total displaced: 2,850,000–3,000,000 (UN estimate); 450,000 (Sudanese government estimate)

The War in Darfur, also nicknamed the Land Cruiser War, (Note: The name "Land Cruiser War" for the conflict in Darfur is primarily used by Justice and Equality Movement (JEM) rebels due to the widespread use of Toyota Land Cruisers as technicals on both sides of the war.) was a major armed conflict in the Darfur region of Sudan that began in February 2003 when the Sudan Liberation Movement (SLM) and the Justice and Equality Movement (JEM) rebel groups began fighting against the government of Sudan, which they accused of oppressing Darfur's non-Arab population. The government responded to attacks by carrying out a campaign of ethnic cleansing against Darfur's non-Arabs. This resulted in the death of hundreds of thousands of civilians and the indictment of Sudan's president, Omar al-Bashir, for genocide, war crimes, and crimes against humanity by the International Criminal Court.

One side of the conflict is mainly composed of the Sudanese military, police, and the Janjaweed, a Sudanese militia group whose members are mostly recruited among Arabized indigenous Africans and a small number of Bedouin of the northern Rizeigat; the majority of other Arab groups in Darfur remained uninvolved. The other side is made up of rebel groups, notably the SLM/A and the JEM, recruited primarily from the non-Arab Muslim Fur, Zaghawa, and Masalit ethnic groups. The African Union and the United Nations also had a joint peacekeeping mission in the region, named UNAMID. Although the Sudanese government publicly denies that it supported the Janjaweed, evidence supports claims that it provided financial assistance and weapons and coordinated joint attacks, many against civilians. Estimates of the number of human casualties range up to several hundred thousand dead, from either combat or starvation and disease. Mass displacements and coercive migrations forced millions into refugee camps or across the border, creating a humanitarian crisis. U.S. secretary of state Colin Powell described the situation as a genocide or acts of genocide.

The Sudanese government and the JEM signed a ceasefire agreement in February 2010, with a tentative agreement to pursue peace. The JEM had the most to gain from the talks and could have seen semi-autonomy, much like South Sudan. However, talks were disrupted by accusations that the Sudanese army launched raids and air strikes against a village, violating the Tolu agreement. The JEM, the largest rebel group in Darfur, vowed to boycott negotiations.

The August 2019 Draft Constitutional Declaration, signed by military and civilian representatives during the Sudanese revolution, requires that a peace process leading to a peace agreement be made in Darfur and other regions of armed conflict in Sudan within the first six months of the 39-month transition period to democratic civilian government.

A comprehensive peace agreement was signed on 31 August 2020 between the Sudanese authorities and several rebel factions to end armed hostilities.

List of abbreviations used in this article

AU: African Union
DLF: Darfur Liberation Front
ICC: International Criminal Court
IDP: Internally Displaced Person
JEM: Justice and Equality Movement
SLM/A/A: Sudan Liberation Movement/Army
SLM/A: Sudan Liberation Movement
SPLA: Sudan People's Liberation Army
UN: United Nations
UNAMID: United Nations African Union Mission in Darfur
UNSC: United Nations Security Council

== Origins of the conflict ==
Darfur, Arabic for "the home of the Fur", was not a traditional part of the states organized along the upper Nile valley but instead organized as an independent sultanate in the 14th century. Owing to the migration of the Banu Hilal tribe in the 11th century AD, the peoples of the Nile valley became heavily Arabicized while the hinterlands remained closer to native Sudanese cultures. It was first annexed to Egyptian Sudan in 1875 and then surrendered by its governor Slatin Pasha to the Mahdist State in 1883. Following the Anglo-Egyptian victory in the Mahdist War, Sultan Ali Dinar was reinstated as a British client before being deposed by a 1916 expedition after he began supporting the Ottoman Empire amid the First World War. Subsequently, Darfur remained a part of the Anglo-Egyptian Sudan and the independent Republic of the Sudan.

There are several different explanations for the origins of the conflict that started in 2003. One explanation involves the land disputes between semi-nomadic livestock herders and those who practice sedentary agriculture. Water access has also been identified as a major source of the conflict. The Darfur crisis is also related to the First and Second Sudanese Civil Wars, between the Arab-dominated government and the Christian and animist black southerners. Yet another origin is conflict between the Islamist, Khartoum-based national government and two rebel groups based in Darfur: the Sudan Liberation Army (SLA) and the Justice and Equality Movement.

=== Allegations of apartheid ===
In early 1991, non-Arabs of the Zaghawa tribe of Sudan attested that they were victims of an intensifying Arab apartheid campaign, segregating Arabs and non-Arabs. Sudanese Arabs, who controlled the government, were widely referred to as practicing apartheid against Sudan's non-Arab citizens. The government was accused of "deftly manipulat[ing] Arab solidarity" to carry out policies of apartheid and ethnic cleansing.

American University economist George Ayittey accused the Arab government of Sudan of practicing racism against black citizens. According to Ayittey, "In Sudan... the Arabs monopolized power and excluded blacks – Arab apartheid." Many African commentators joined Ayittey in accusing Sudan of practising Arab apartheid.

Alan Dershowitz claimed Sudan was an example of apartheid. Former Canadian Minister of Justice Irwin Cotler echoed the accusation.

== History ==
=== Beginning ===
Authors Julie Flint and Alex de Waal date the beginning of the rebellion to 21 July 2001, when a group of Zaghawa and Fur met in Abu Gamra and swore oaths on the Quran (nearly all of Darfur's residents are Muslim, including the Janjaweed, as well as the government leaders in Khartoum) to work together to defend against government-sponsored attacks on their villages. The rebels' first military action was a successful attack on an army garrison on 25 February 2002. The government had been aware of a unified rebel movement since an attack on the Golo police station in June, 2002. Flint and de Waal place the start of the Darfur Genocide on 26 February 2003, when a group calling itself the Darfur Liberation Front (DLF) publicly claimed responsibility for an attack on Golo, the headquarters of Jebel Marra District. By this point several rebel attacks had been carried out against police stations, army outposts and military convoys and the government engaged in a massive air and land assault on the rebel stronghold in the Marrah Mountains.

On 25 March 2003, the rebels seized the garrison town of Tina along the Chadian border, seizing large quantities of supplies and arms. Despite a threat by President Omar al-Bashir to "unleash" the army, the military had little in reserve. The army was already deployed in both the south, where the Second Sudanese Civil War was drawing to an end, and the east, where rebels sponsored by Eritrea were threatening a newly constructed pipeline from the central oilfields to Port Sudan. The rebel guerilla tactic of hit-and-run raids proved almost impossible for the army – untrained in desert operations – to counter. However, its aerial bombardment of rebel positions on the mountain was devastating.

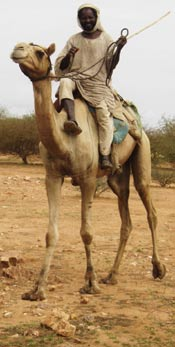
The Janjaweed have been a major player in the conflict.

At 5:30 am on 25 April 2003, the Darfur genocide arose when the Sudan Liberation Movement and the JEM, which is the largest rebel group in Darfur, entered El Fasher, the capital city of North Darfur and attacked the sleeping garrison. In the next four hours, four Antonov bombers and helicopter gunships (according to the government; seven according to the rebels) were destroyed on the ground, 75 soldiers, pilots and technicians were killed and 32 were captured, including the commander of the air base, a Major General. The success of the raid was unprecedented in Sudan; in the twenty years of the war in the south, the rebel Sudan People's Liberation Army (SPLA) had never before carried out such an operation.

The El Fasher raid was a turning point, both militarily and psychologically. The armed forces had been humiliated by the raid, placing the government in a difficult strategic situation. The incompetent armed forces needed to be retrained and redeployed amid concerns about the loyalty of the many Darfurian non-commissioned officers and soldiers. Responsibility for prosecuting the war was given to Sudanese military intelligence. Nevertheless, in the middle months of 2003, rebels won 34 of 38 engagements. In May, the SLA destroyed a battalion at Kutum, killing 500 and taking 300 prisoners; in mid-July, 250 were killed in a second attack on Tina. The SLA began to infiltrate farther east, threatening to extend the war into Kordofan.

Given that the army was consistently losing, the war effort switched to emphasize three elements: military intelligence, the air force and the Janjaweed. The latter were armed Baggara herders whom the government had used to suppress a Masalit uprising from 1986 to 1999. The Janjaweed became the center of the new counter-insurgency strategy. Though the government consistently denied supporting them, military resources were poured into Darfur and the Janjaweed were outfitted as a paramilitary force, complete with communication equipment and some artillery. The military planners were aware of the probable consequences of such a strategy: similar methods undertaken in the Nuba Mountains and around the southern oil fields during the 1990s had resulted in massive human rights violations and forced displacements.

=== 2004–2005 ===
In 2004, Chad brokered negotiations in N'Djamena, leading to the April 8 Humanitarian Ceasefire Agreement between the Sudanese government, the JEM, and the SLA. One group that did not participate in the April cease-fire talks or agreement was the National Movement for Reform and Development, who had split from the JEM in April. Janjaweed and rebel attacks continued despite the ceasefire, and the African Union (AU) formed a Ceasefire Commission (CFC) to monitor its observance.

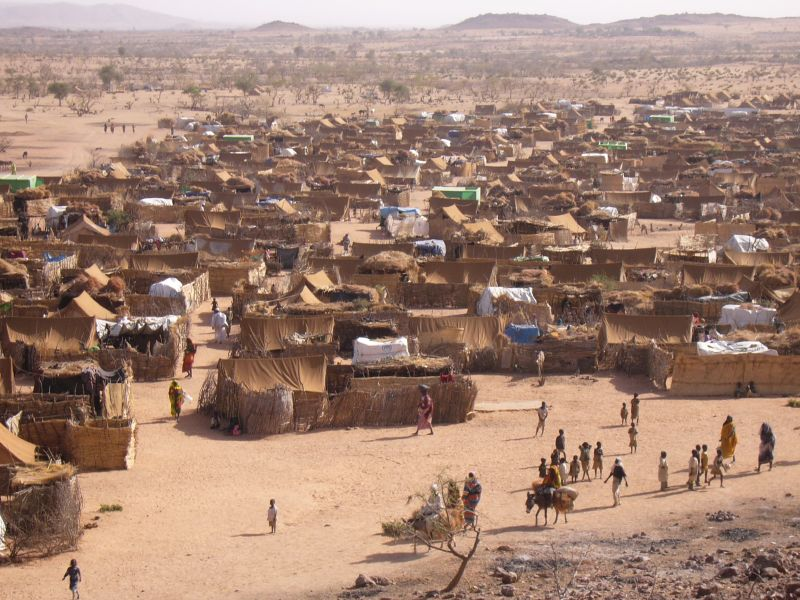
Darfur refugee camp in Chad, 2005

In August, the African Union sent 150 Rwandan troops to protect the ceasefire monitors. However, it soon became apparent that 150 troops would not be enough, and they were subsequently joined by 150 Nigerian troops.

On 18 September, the United Nations Security Council issued Resolution 1564 declaring that the Sudanese government had not met its commitments and expressing concern at helicopter attacks and assaults by the Janjaweed. It welcomed the intention of the African Union to enhance its monitoring mission and urged all member states to support such efforts.

During April, 2005, after the Sudanese government signed a ceasefire agreement with Sudan People's Liberation Army (SPLA) which led to the end of the Second Sudanese Civil War, the African Union Mission in Sudan (AMIS) force was increased by 600 troops and 80 military observers. In July, the force was increased by about 3,300 (with a budget of 220 million dollars). In April, 2005, AMIS's forces were increased to about 7,000.

The scale of the crisis led to warnings of an imminent disaster, with United Nations Secretary-General Kofi Annan warning about the risk of genocide. The scale of the Janjaweed campaign led to comparisons with the Rwandan genocide, a parallel denied by the Sudanese government. Independent observers noted that the tactics, which included dismemberment and killing of noncombatants, including young children and infants, were more akin to the ethnic cleansing used in the Yugoslav wars and warned that the region's remoteness meant that hundreds of thousands of people were effectively cut off from aid. The Brussels-based International Crisis Group had reported in May 2004 that over 350,000 people could potentially die as a result of starvation and disease.

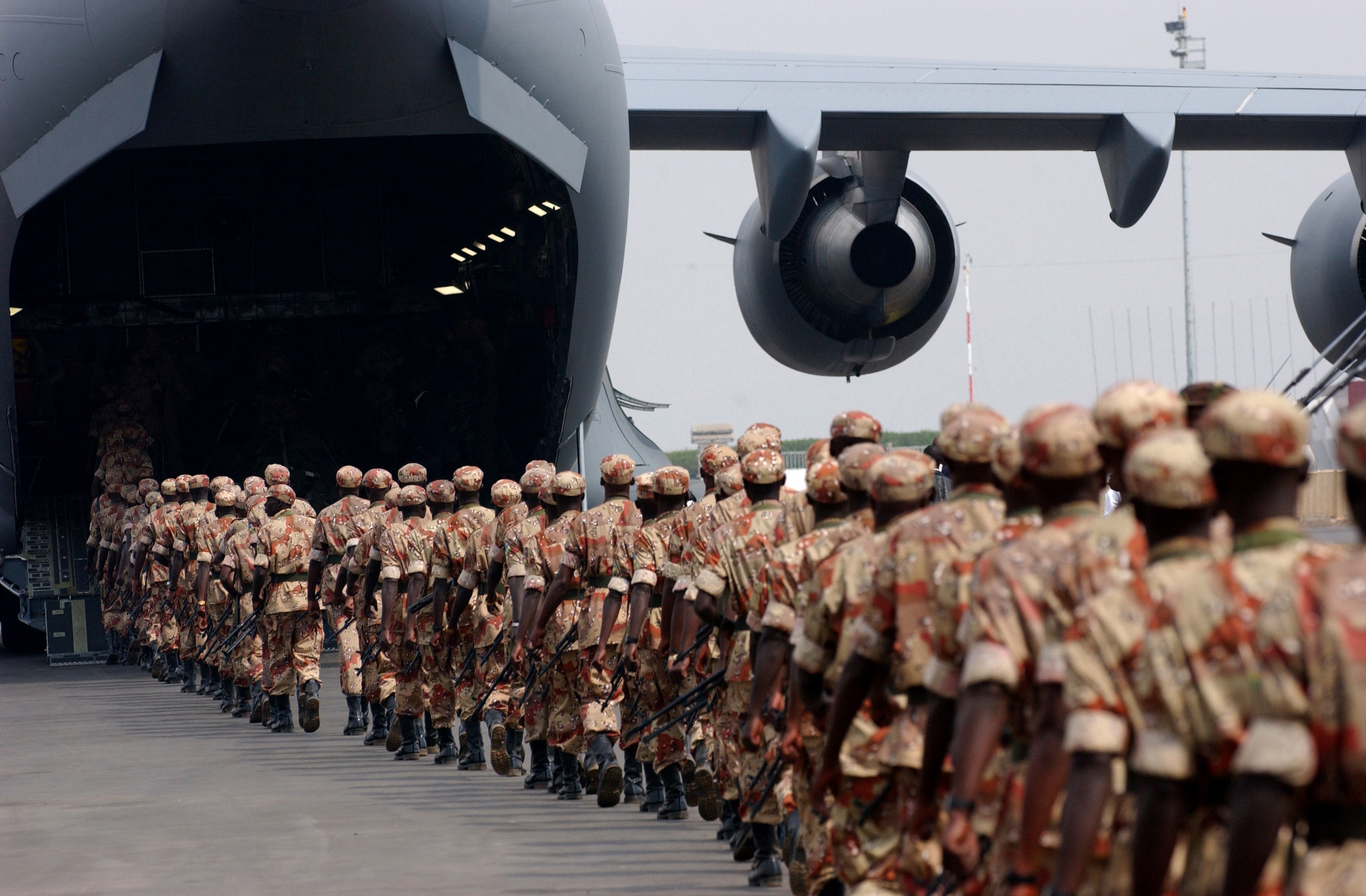
AMIS soldiers from Rwanda preparing to depart to Darfur in 2005

On 10 July 2005, SPLA leader John Garang was sworn in as Sudan's vice-president. However, on 30 July, Garang died in a helicopter crash. Despite improved security, talks between the various rebels in the Darfur region progressed slowly.

An attack on the Chadian town of Adré near the Sudanese border led to the death of 300 rebels in December. Sudan was blamed for the attack, which was the second in the region in three days. Escalating tensions led the government of Chad to declare its hostility toward Sudan and to call for Chadians to mobilise against the "common enemy" (see Chad-Sudan conflict).

=== 2006 ===
On 5 May 2006, the Sudanese government signed the Darfur Peace Agreement along with the faction of the SLA led by Minni Minnawi. However, the agreement was rejected by the smaller JEM and a rival faction of the SLA led by Abdul Wahid al Nur. The accord was orchestrated by chief negotiator Salim Ahmed Salim (working on behalf of the African Union), U.S. Deputy Secretary of State Robert B. Zoellick, AU representatives and other foreign officials operating in Abuja, Nigeria.

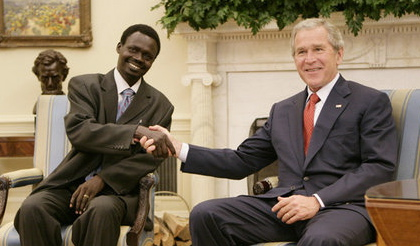
Minni Minnawi with U.S. President George W. Bush after he signed the May agreement

The 115-page agreement included agreements on national and state power-sharing, demilitarization of the Janjaweed and other militias, an integration of Sudan Liberation Movement/Army (SLM/A) and JEM troops into the Sudanese Armed Forces and police, a system of federal wealth-sharing for the promotion of Darfurian economic interests, a referendum on the future status of Darfur and measures to promote the flow of humanitarian aid.

Representatives of the African Union, Nigeria, Libya, the United States, the United Kingdom, the United Nations, the European Union, the Arab League, Egypt, Canada, Norway and the Netherlands served as witnesses.

Renewed fighting began in July and August 2006, and international aid organizations considered leaving due to attacks against their personnel. Annan called for 18,000 international peacekeepers in Darfur to replace the 7,000-man AMIS force. In one incident at Kalma, seven women, who ventured out of a refugee camp to gather firewood, were gang-raped, beaten and robbed by the Janjaweed. When they had finished, the attackers stripped them naked and jeered at them as they fled.

In a private meeting on 18 August, Hédi Annabi, Assistant Secretary-General for Peacekeeping Operations, warned that Sudan appeared to be preparing for a major military offensive. The warning came a day after UN Commission on Human Rights special investigator Sima Samar stated that Sudan's efforts remained poor despite the May Agreement. On 19 August, Sudan reiterated its opposition to replacing AMIS with a UN force, resulting in the US issuing a "threat" to Sudan over the "potential consequences".

On 25 August, Sudan rejected attending a United Nations Security Council (UNSC) meeting to explain its plan to send 10,000 Sudanese soldiers to Darfur instead of the proposed 20,000 UN peacekeeping force. The Security Council announced it would hold the meeting despite Sudan's absence. Also on 24 August, the International Rescue Committee reported that hundreds of women were raped and sexually assaulted around the Kalma refugee camp during the previous several weeks and that the Janjaweed were reportedly using rape to cause women to be humiliated and ostracised by their own communities. On 25 August, the head of the U.S. State Department's Bureau of African Affairs, Assistant Secretary Jendayi Frazer, warned that the region faced a security crisis unless the UN peacekeeping force deployed.

On 26 August, two days before the UNSC meeting and Frazer was due to arrive in Khartoum, Paul Salopek, a U.S. National Geographic Magazine journalist, appeared in court in Darfur facing charges of espionage; he had crossed into the country illegally from Chad, circumventing the Sudanese government's official restrictions on foreign journalists. He was later released after direct negotiation with President al-Bashir. This came a month after Tomo Križnar, a Slovenian presidential envoy, was sentenced to two years in prison for spying.

==== Proposed UN peacekeeping force ====
On 31 August 2006, the UNSC approved a resolution to send a new peacekeeping force of 17,300 to the region. Sudan expressed strong opposition to the resolution. On 1 September, African Union officials reported that Sudan had launched a major offensive in Darfur, killing more than 20 civilians and displacing over 1,000. On 5 September, Sudan asked the existing AU force to leave by the end of the month, adding that "they have no right to transfer this assignment to the United Nations or any other party. This right rests with the government of Sudan." On 4 September, in a move not viewed as surprising, Chad's president Idriss Déby voiced support for the UN peacekeeping force. The AU, whose mandate expired on 30 September 2006, confirmed that the AMIS would leave. The next day, however, a senior US State Department official told reporters that the AU force might remain past the deadline.

==== Autumn ====
On 8 September, António Guterres, head of the United Nations High Commissioner for Refugees, said Darfur faced a "humanitarian catastrophe". On 12 September, Sudan's European Union envoy Pekka Haavisto claimed that the Sudanese army was "bombing civilians in Darfur". A World Food Programme official reported that food aid had been blocked from reaching at least 355,000 people. Annan said, "the tragedy in Darfur has reached a critical moment. It merits this council's closest attention and urgent action." On 14 September, the leader of the Sudan Liberation Movement, Minni Minnawi, stated that he did not object to the UN peacekeeping force, rejecting the Sudanese government's view that such a deployment would be an act of Western invasion. Minnawi claimed that AMIS "can do nothing because the AU mandate is very limited". Khartoum remained opposed to UN involvement, with al-Bashir depicting it as a colonial plan and stating that "we do not want Sudan to turn into another Iraq."

On 2 October, the AU announced that it would extend its presence until 31 December 2006. Two hundred UN troops were sent to reinforce the AU force. On 6 October, the UNSC voted to extend the mandate of the United Nations Mission in Sudan until 30 April 2007. On 9 October, the Food and Agriculture Organization listed Darfur as the most pressing food emergency out of the forty countries listed on its Crop Prospects and Food Situation report. On 10 October, the UN High Commissioner for Human Rights, Louise Arbour, claimed that the Sudanese government had prior knowledge of attacks by Janjaweed militias in Buram, South Darfur the month before, in which hundreds of civilians were killed.

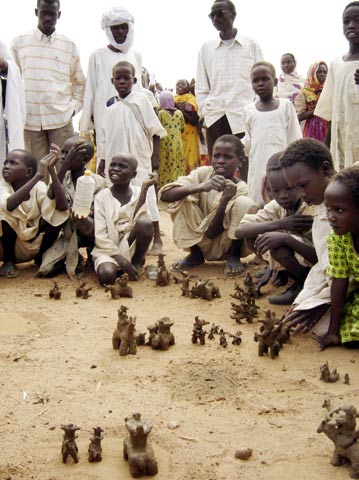
Children in the camps are encouraged to confront their psychological scars. The clay figures depict an attack by Janjaweed.

On 12 October, Nigerian Foreign Minister Joy Ogwu arrived in Darfur for a two-day visit. She urged the Sudanese government to accept the UN proposal. Nigerian President Olusegun Obasanjo spoke against "stand[ing] by and see[ing] genocide taking place in Darfur." On 13 October, US President George W. Bush imposed further sanctions against those deemed complicit in the atrocities under the Darfur Peace and Accountability Act of 2006. The measures were said to strengthen existing sanctions by prohibiting US citizens from engaging in oil-related transactions with Sudan (although US companies had been prohibited from doing business with Sudan since 1997), freezing the assets of complicit parties and denying them entry to the US.

The lack of funding and equipment for the AU mission meant that the work of aid workers in Darfur was severely limited by fighting. Some warned that the humanitarian situation could deteriorate to levels seen in 2003 and 2004, when UN officials called Darfur the world's worst humanitarian crisis.

On 22 October, the Government of Sudan told UN envoy Jan Pronk to leave the country within three days. Pronk, the senior UN official in the country, had been heavily criticized by the Sudanese army after he posted a description of several recent military defeats in Darfur to his personal blog. On 1 November, the US announced that it would formulate an international plan which it hoped the Sudanese government would find more palatable. On 9 November, senior Sudanese presidential advisor Nafie Ali Nafie told reporters that his government was prepared to start unconditional talks with the National Redemption Front (NRF) rebel alliance, but noted he saw little use for a new peace agreement. The NRF, which had rejected the May Agreement and sought a new peace agreement, did not comment.

In late 2006, Darfur Arabs started their own rebel group, the Popular Forces Troops, and announced on 6 December that they had repulsed an assault by the Sudanese army at Kas-Zallingi the previous day. They were the latest of numerous Darfur Arab groups to oppose the government since 2003, some of which had signed political accords with rebel movements.

The same period saw an example of a tribe-based split within the Arab forces, when relations between the farming Terjem and nomadic, camel-herding Mahria tribes became tense. Terjem leaders accused the Mahria of kidnapping a Terjem boy, while Mahria leaders said the Terjem had been stealing their animals. Ali Mahamoud Mohammed, the wali, or governor, of South Darfur, said the fighting began in December when the Mahria drove their camels south in a seasonal migration, trampling through Terjem territory near the Bulbul River. Fighting resumed in July 2007.

==== Proposed compromise UN force and Sudanese offensive ====
On 17 November, reports of a potential deal to place a "compromise peacekeeping force" in Darfur were announced, but would later appear to have been rejected by Sudan. The UN claimed on 18 November that Sudan had agreed to the deployment of UN peacekeepers. Sudan's Foreign Minister Lam Akol stated that "there should be no talk about a mixed force" and that the UN's role should be restricted to technical support. Also on 18 November, the AU reported that Sudanese military and Sudanese-backed militias had launched a ground and air operation in the region that resulted in about 70 civilian deaths. The AU stated that this "was a flagrant violation of security agreements".

On 25 November, a spokesperson for UN High Commissioner for Human Rights accused the Sudanese government of having committed "a deliberate and unprovoked attack" against civilians in Sirba on 11 November, which claimed the lives of at least 30 people. The Commissioner's statement maintained that "contrary to the government's claim, it appears that the Sudanese Armed Forces launched a deliberate and unprovoked attack on civilians and their property in Sirba," and that this also involved "extensive and wanton destruction and looting of civilian property".

=== 2007 ===
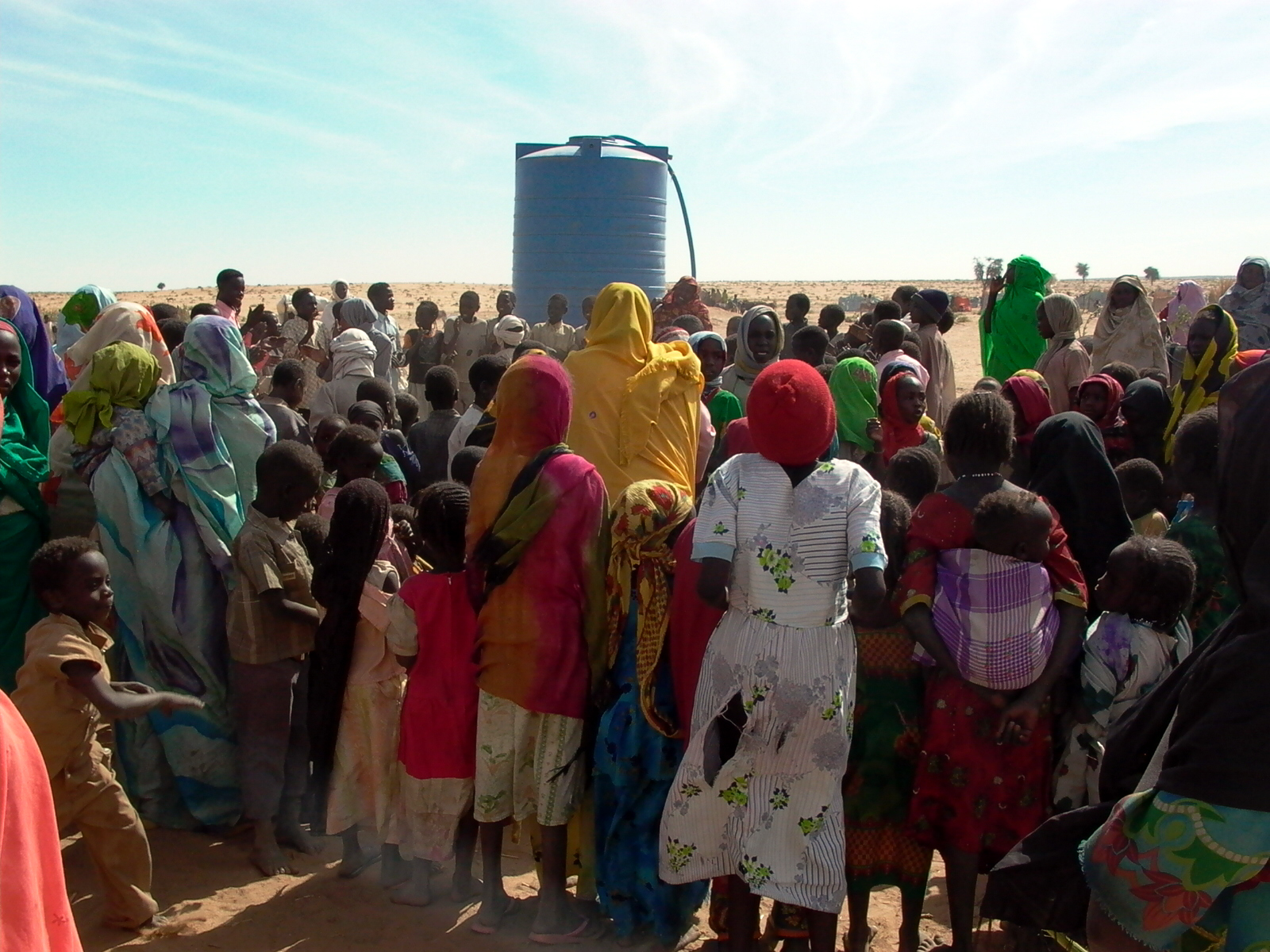
Displaced persons with water tank in Geneina, West Darfur in 2007

According to the Save Darfur Coalition, New Mexico Governor Bill Richardson and al-Bashir agreed to a cease-fire whereby the Sudanese "government and rebel groups will cease hostilities for a period of 60 days while they work towards a lasting peace." In addition, the Save Darfur press release stated that the agreement "included a number of concessions to improve humanitarian aid and media access to Darfur." Despite the formality of a ceasefire there were further media reports of killings and other violence. On 15 April 2007, African Union peacekeepers were targeted and killed. The New York Times reported that "a confidential United Nations report says the government of Sudan is flying arms and heavy military equipment into Darfur in violation of Security Council resolutions and painting Sudanese military planes white to disguise them as United Nations or African Union aircraft."

On 28 February, Sudan's humanitarian affairs minister, Ahmed Haroun, and Janjaweed militia leader, Ali Kushayb, were charged by the International Criminal Court with 51 counts of war crimes and crimes against humanity. Ahmed Haroun said he "did not feel guilty", his conscience was clear, and that he was ready to defend himself.

On 31 March, Janjaweed militiamen killed 200 to 400 people in the eastern border region of Chad near Sudan. The border villages of Tiero and Marena were encircled and then fired upon. The women were robbed and the men shot according to the UNHCR. Many of those who survived the initial attack, ended up dying due to exhaustion and dehydration, often while fleeing. On 14 April 2007, more attacks were reported by the UNHCR in Tiero and Marena.

On 18 April President George W. Bush gave a speech at the United States Holocaust Memorial Museum criticizing the Sudanese government and threatened further sanctions if the situation did not improve.

Al-Bashir and President of Chad, Idriss Déby signed a peace agreement on 3 May 2007 aimed at reducing tension between their countries. The accord was brokered by Saudi Arabia. It asserted that neither country would harbor, train or fund armed movements opposed to the other. Reuters reported that "Deby's fears that Nouri's UFDD may have been receiving Saudi as well as Sudanese support could have pushed him to sign the Saudi-mediated pact with Bashir". Colin Thomas-Jensen, an expert on Chad and Darfur at the International Crisis Group expressed doubts as to whether "this new deal will lead to any genuine thaw in relations or improvement in the security situation". Chadian rebel Union of Forces for Democracy and Development (UFDD) which had fought a hit-and-run war against Déby's forces in eastern Chad since 2006, stated that the Saudi-backed peace deal would not stop its military campaign.

Oxfam announced on 17 June that it would permanently pull out of Gereida, the largest refugee camp, which had a population of over 130,000. The agency cited inaction by local authorities from the Sudan Liberation Movement (SLM), which controls the region, in addressing security concerns and violence against aid workers. An employee of the NGO Action by Churches Together was murdered in June in West Darfur. Vehicle hijackings also made them consider leaving.

BBC News reported that a huge underground lake had been found. This find could eliminate the competition for water resources.

France and Britain announced they would push for a UN resolution to dispatch African Union and United Nations peacekeepers to Darfur and would push for an immediate cease-fire in Darfur and are prepared to provide "substantial" economic aid "as soon as a cease-fire makes it possible".

A 14 July 2007 article noted that in the past two months up to 75,000 Arabs from Chad and Niger had crossed into Darfur. Most have been relocated by Sudanese government to former villages of displaced non-Arab people.

A hybrid UN/AU force was finally approved on 31 July with the unanimously approved United Nations Security Council Resolution 1769. UNAMID was to take over from AMIS by 31 December at the latest, and had an initial mandate up to 31 July 2008.

On 31 July, Mahria gunmen surrounded mourners at the funeral of an important Terjem sheik and killed 60 with rocket-propelled grenades (RPGs) and belt-fed machine guns.

Between 3 August and 5 August a conference was held in Arusha to unite the rebel groups to streamline the subsequent peace negotiations with the government. Most senior rebel leaders attended, with the notable exception of Abdul Wahid al Nur, who headed a rather small splinter group of the SLA/M that he had initially founded in 2003, was considered to be the representatives of a large part of the displaced Fur people. His absence was damaging to the peace talks. International officials stated that there is "no John Garang in Darfur", referring to the leader of the negotiating team of South Sudan, who was universally accepted by the various South Sudanese rebel groups.

The participants were Gamali Galaleiddine, Khalil Abdalla Adam, Salah Abu Surra, Khamis Abdallah Abakar, Ahmed Abdelshafi, Abdalla Yahya, Khalil Ibrahim (of the Justice and Equality Movement) and Ahmed Ibrahim Ali Diraige. Closed-door meetings between the AU-UN and rebel leaders, as well as among rebel leaders took place. Eight more participants arrived on 4 August (including Jar el-Neby, Salah Adam Isaac and Suleiman Marajan), while the SLM Unity faction boycotted the talks because the Sudanese government had threatened to arrest Suleiman Jamous if he left the hospital. The rebel leaders aimed to unify their positions and demands, which included compensation for the victims and autonomy for Darfur. They eventually reached agreement on joint demands, including power and wealth sharing, security, land and humanitarian issues.

In the months through August, Arab tribes that had worked together in the Janjaweed militia began falling out among themselves, and further splintered. Thousands of Terjem and Mahria gunmen traveled hundreds of miles to fight in the strategic Bulbul river valley. Farther south, Habanniya and Salamat tribes clashed. The fighting did not result in as many deaths as in 2003 and 2004. United Nations officials said the groups might be trying to seize land before peacekeepers arrived.

On 18 September, the JEM stated that if the peace talks with Khartoum should fail, they would step up their demands from self-determination to independence.

On 30 September, the rebels overran an AMIS base, killing at least 12 peacekeepers in "the heaviest loss of life and biggest attack on the African Mission" during a raid at the end of Ramadan season.

Peace talks started on 27 October in Sirte, Libya. The following groups attended:

- Justice and Equality Movement splinters:
  - Justice and Equality Movement–Collective Leadership, led by Bahr Idriss Abu Garda
  - Justice and Equality Movement–Azraq, led by Idriss Ibrahim Azraq
  - National Movement for Reform and Development, led by Khalil Abdullah
- Revolutionary Democratic Forces Front, led by Salah Abu Surrah
- United Revolutionary Force Front, led by Alhadi Agabeldour
- Sudan Liberation Movement–G19, led by Khamees Abdullah
- Sudan Federal Democratic Alliance, led by Ahmed Ibrahim Diraige

The following groups did not attend:

- Justice and Equality Movement, led by Khalil Ibrahim; they object to the presence of rebel groups they say had no constituency and no place at the table.
- Sudan Liberation Movement (Abdel Wahed), led by Abdel Wahed Mohamed el-Nur; the group has few forces, but its leader is highly respected; refused to attend until a force was deployed to stem the Darfur violence.
- Sudan Liberation Movement–Unity, originally led by Abdallah Yehya, includes many other prominent figures (Sharif Harir, Abu Bakr Kadu, Ahmed Kubur); the group with the largest number of rebel fighters; object for the same reason as the JEM.
- Ahmed Abdel Shafi, a notable rebel enjoying strong support from the Fur tribe.

Faced with a boycott from the most important rebel factions, the talks were rebranded as an "advanced consultation phase", with official talks likely to start in November or December.

On 15 November, nine rebel groups – six SLM factions, the Democratic Popular Front, the Sudanese Revolutionary Front and the Justice and Equality Movement–Field Revolutionary Command – signed a Charter of Unification and agreed to operate under the name of SLM/A henceforth. On 30 November it was announced that Darfur's rebel movements had united into two large groups and were now ready to negotiate in an orderly manner with the government.

=== 2008 ===
On 20 February, rebels and humanitarian workers reported that a fresh government/militia offensive had trapped thousands of refugees along the Chadian border. As of 21 February, the total dead in Darfur stood at 450,000 with an estimated 3,245,000 people displaced.

On 10 May 2008 Sudanese government soldiers and Darfur rebels clashed in the city of Omdurman, opposite the capital of Khartoum, over the control of a military headquarters. They also raided a police base from which they stole police vehicles. A Sudanese police spokesperson said that the leader of the assailants, Mohamed Saleh Garbo, and his intelligence chief, Mohamed Nur Al-Deen, were killed in the clash.

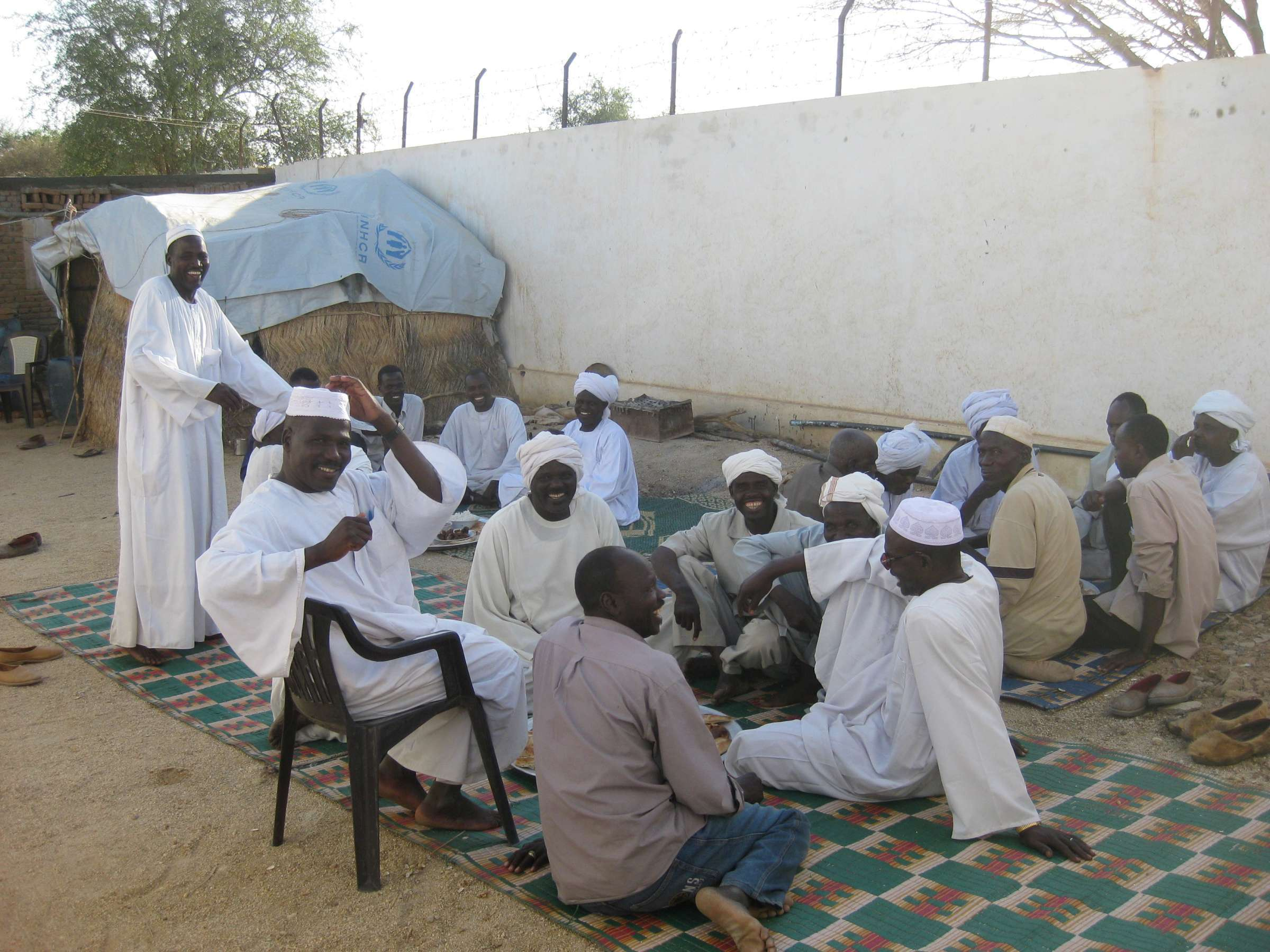
Darfur men in 2008

Witnesses said that heavy gunfire could be heard in the west of Sudan's capital. Sudanese troops backed by tanks, artillery, and helicopter gunships were immediately deployed to Omdurman, and fighting raged for several hours. After seizing the strategic military airbase at Wadi-Sayedna, the Sudanese soldiers eventually defeated the rebels. A JEM force headed to the Al-Ingaz bridge to cross the White Nile into Khartoum. By late afternoon, Sudanese TV claimed that the rebels had been "completely repulsed", while showing live images of burnt vehicles and corpses on the streets. The government imposed a curfew in Khartoum from 5 pm to 6 am, while aid agencies told their workers in the capital to stay indoors.

=== 2009 ===
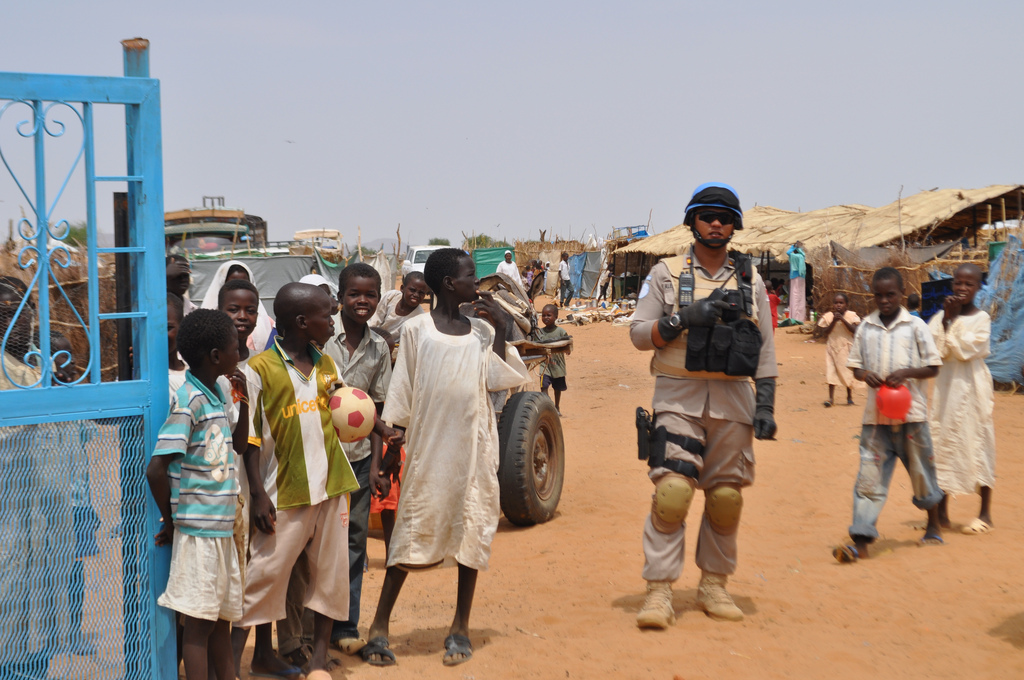
A UN Peacekeeper in the Abu Shouk IDP Camp, September 2009

General Martin Agwai, head of the joint African Union-United Nations mission in Darfur, said the war was over in the region, although low-level disputes remained. There was still "[b]anditry, localised issues, people trying to resolve issues over water and land at a local level. But real war as such, I think we are over that," he said.

=== 2010 to 2012 ===
In December 2010, representatives of the Liberation and Justice Movement (LJM), an umbrella organisation of ten rebel groups formed in February 2010, started a fresh round of talks with the Sudanese government in Doha. A new rebel group, the Sudanese Alliance Resistance Forces in Darfur was formed and JEM planned further talks. Talks ended on 19 December with agreement only on basic principles; these included a regional authority and a referendum on autonomy. The possibility of a Darfuri Vice-President was discussed.

In January 2011, the leader of the LJM, Dr. Tijani Sese, stated that the movement had accepted the core proposals of the Darfur peace document as proposed by the mediators in Doha. The proposals included a $300,000,000 compensation package for victims of atrocities in Darfur and special courts to conduct trials of persons accused of human rights violations. Proposals for a new Darfur Regional Authority were included. This authority would have an executive council of 18 ministers and would remain in place for five years. The current three Darfur states and state governments would continue to exist during this period. In February, the Sudanese government rejected the idea of a single region headed by a vice-president from the region.

On 29 January, the LJM and JEM leaders issued a joint statement affirming their commitment to the Doha negotiations and intention to attend the Doha forum on 5 February. The Sudanese government postponed decision to attend the forum due to beliefs that an internal peace process without the involvement of rebel groups might be possible. Later in February, the Sudanese government agreed to return to Doha with a view to complete a new peace agreement by the end of that month. On 25 February, both the LJM and the JEM announced that they had rejected the peace document proposed by the mediators in Doha. The main sticking points were the issues of a Darfuri vice-president and compensation for victims. The Sudanese government did not comment on the peace document.

On 9 March, it was announced that two more states would be established in Darfur: Central Darfur around Zalingei and Eastern Darfur around Ed Daein. The rebel groups protested and stated that this was a bid to further divide Darfur's influence.

Advising both the LJM and JEM during the Doha peace negotiations was the Public International Law & Policy Group (PILPG). Led by Dr. Paul Williams and Matthew T. Simpson, PILPG's team provided legal support.

In June, a new Darfur Peace Agreement (2011) was proposed by the Doha mediators. This agreement was to supersede the Abuja Agreement of 2005 and when signed, would halt preparations for a Darfur status referendum. The proposed document included provisions for a Darfuri Vice-President and an administrative structure that included three states and a strategic regional authority, the Darfur Regional Authority. The agreement was signed by the Government of Sudan and the LJM on 14 July 2011.

On 1 February 2012, clashes between the JEM and a group of armed Arab citizens in East Darfur left 3 rebels killed, the attacks occurred as a response to repeated violations by JEM in the area.

On 22 February, the Sudan Liberation Movement led by Minni Minnawi (SLM-MM) killed 12 Sudanese soldiers and took control of the Alawna area in North Darfur. The SLM-MM also said they destroyed one vehicle and captured another belonging to the Sudanese forces and said one of their soldiers was wounded in the fighting.

Little progress occurred after September 2012 and the situation slowly worsened and violence was escalating. The population of displaced Sudanese in IDP camps also increased.

=== 2013 ===
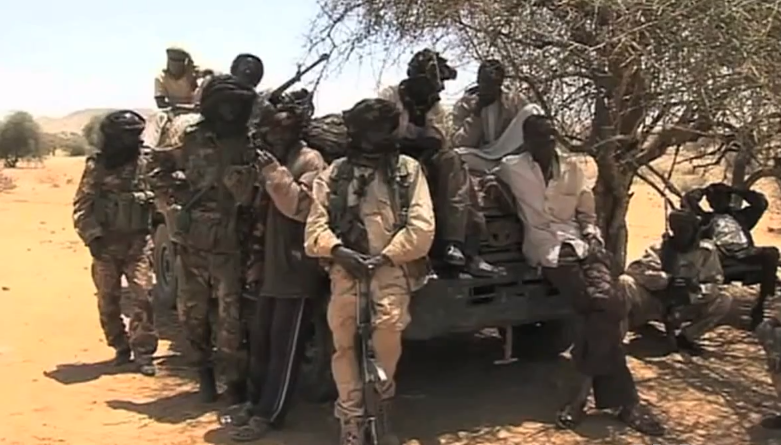
Pro-government militia in Darfur. (2013)

A donors conference in Doha pledged US$3.6 billion to help rebuild Darfur. The conference was criticised in the region that the Sudan Liberation Army (Minni Minnawi) rebels had taken. According to the group's Hussein Minnawi, Ashma village and another town close to the South Darfur capital of Nyala were taken by the SLA.

On 27 April, following weeks of fighting, a coalition that included SLA and JEM said that they had taken Um Rawaba in North Kordofan, outside Darfur, and that they were headed for Khartoum to topple the president. The head of an SLA faction, Abdel Wahid Mohammed al-Nur, called it "a significant shift in the war". An estimated 300,000 were displaced by violence from January through May.

In North Darfur, the Rezeigat tribe and the Beni Hussein group signed a peace deal during July after an eruption of violence between the two groups killed hundreds. Later in July, the Misseriya and Salamat Arab tribes announced a ceasefire after battles killed over 200 people. The UN security counsel also announced a review of its UNAMID mission.

During the first week of August, the Maalia claimed the Rezeigat had killed five members of their tribe in the southeastern region of Adila. They responded by seizing 400 Rizeigat cattle on 6 August. Community leaders intervened to prevent escalation. When the Maalia failed to return the cattle, violence broke out on 10 August. The Rezeigat attacked and reportedly destroyed a Maaliya compound. In the battle, 77 Maaliya and 36 Rezeigat were killed, and another 200 people were injured. Both sides said Land Cruisers were used in the battle. The Maaliya accused the Rezeigat of attacking and burning villages while employing "heavy weaponry". On 11 August, the fighting spread to several other areas in southeastern Darfur. The violence reportedly arose over a land dispute.

=== 2014 ===
On 19 March, peacekeepers said they had received recent reports of villages that were attacked and burned after the UN expressed concern over the increasing number of internally displaced persons. UNAMID said that the attacks were in Hashaba, about 100 kilometers north-west of the city El Fasher, the state capital of North Darfur.

In November, local media reported that 200 women and girls had been raped by Sudanese soldiers in Tabit. Sudan denied this and did not permit the UN (who said their first inquiry was inconclusive "in part due to the heavy presence of military and police") to make another inquiry. An investigation by Human Rights Watch (HRW) released in February said 221 people were raped by government soldiers in "a mass rape that could constitute crimes against humanity". Witnesses reported three separate operations were carried out in one and a half days. Property was looted, men arrested, residents beaten and women and girls raped. Most of the town's population are Fur people. It had been controlled by rebel forces previously but HRW found no evidence that the rebel fighters were in or close to the village when it was attacked.

3,300 villages were destroyed in 2014 in attacks on civilians according to the UN Panel of Experts. Government forces or those aligned with them were behind most attacks. There were more than 400,000 attacks during the first ten months of the year. The report said that it was "highly probable that civilian communities were targeted as a result of their actual or perceived affiliations with armed opposition groups" and that "such attacks were carried out with impunity".

=== 2016 ===
In September 2016, the Sudanese government reportedly launched chemical weapon attacks on civilian populations in Darfur, killing at least 250 people; the majority of the victims were children. It is believed that the munitions contained mustard gas or other blister agents.

=== 2018 ===
Reports from the United Nations–African Union Mission in Darfur (UNAMID) and the African Center for Justice and Peace Studies suggest that low-level violence continued in Darfur through early 2018, with Sudanese government forces attacking communities in the Jebel Marra area. As UNAMID forces began to be drawn down with an eye to exiting Darfur, there were competing views on the levels of unrest in the region: UN officials pointed to a significant reduction in the scale and distribution of violence in Darfur, while other NGOS such as HRW highlighted persistent pockets of unrest.

=== 2019 ===
The August 2019 Draft Constitutional Declaration, signed by military and civilian representatives during the 2018–19 Sudanese Revolution, requires that a peace agreement be made in Darfur and other regions of armed conflict in Sudan within the first six months of the 39-month transition period to democratic civilian government.

In December 2019, The Guardian reported that irrigation projects built around community-based weirs are enabling "green shoots of peace" to appear, helping to end this conflict. This project was conducted with funding from the European Union and was overseen by the United Nations Environmental Program.

=== 2020 ===
Janjaweed militia leader Ali Kushayb was arrested in the Central African Republic on 9 June 2020, thirteen years after he was charged by the International Criminal Court with 51 crimes against humanity and war crimes. He was convicted of war crimes and crimes against humanity by the ICC in 2025.

Three mass shootings took place in Darfur in July 2020.

On 31 August 2020, a peace deal was signed in Juba, South Sudan, between the Transitional Sovereignty Council and several rebel groups, including the Sudan Revolutionary Front (SRF), the SLM/A, the JEM, the Transitional Revolutionary Council, and the Sudan People's Liberation Movement-North (SPLM–N).

Under the terms of the agreement, the factions that signed will be entitled to three seats on the sovereignty council, a total of five ministers in the transitional cabinet and a quarter of seats in the transitional legislature. At a regional level, signatories will be entitled between 30 and 40% of the seats on transitional legislatures of their home states or regions.

Notably absent were rebel factions led by Abdul Wahid al Nur and Abdelaziz al-Hilu who refused to be part of the agreement. On 3 October 2020, the SRF, the SPLM–N led by Malik Agar and the SLM led by Minni Minnawi signed another peace deal with the Sudanese government, with the absence of both al Nur and al-Hilu. However, the deal included terms to integrate rebels into the security forces, and to grant them political representation and economic and land rights, in addition to a 10-year plan to invest $750 million to develop southern and western regions, and to guarantee the return for displaced people.

In December, Sudan started to deploy troops to South Darfur "in large numbers", following recent tribal violence between the Masalit and Fula.

UNAMID ended its mission on 31 December, with a complete withdrawal scheduled for 30 June. At the time the mission ended UNAMID had 4,000 troops, 1,631 police, 480 police advisers, 483 international civilian staff, and 945 national civilian staff in the region as of December 2020.

=== 2021 ===
On 16 January fighting between Masalit people and Arab nomads in Al Geneina District, West Darfur, left 84 dead and 160 wounded. This was two weeks after the United Nations withdrew its peacekeepers from the region. Based on a statement from the Darfur Bar Association, the incident began when a member of an Arab tribe was stabbed by another member of the Masalit tribe. Following the unrest, a high profile delegation authorized by Sudanese Prime Minister Abdalla Hamdok was sent to the region in order to assess the situation.

Ethnic clashes were also reported to have erupted in the eastern part of Sudan on 31 December 2020 and 1 January 2021 between the Beni Amer and Nuba in Port Sudan.

On 17 January, a curfew was put in place by the Sudanese authorities, including a state of emergency in West Darfur region.

Clashes between the Arabs and non-Arabs in West Darfur began on January 15. By 18 January the death toll was reported to have reached at least 129 people, including women and children.

The United Nations has urged the Sudanese government to see to the de-escalation of the violence in West Darfur and safeguard civilian lives.

On 20 January, the residence of the provincial Governor of West Darfur Mohammed Abdalla al-Douma, was under an attempted attack by unidentified gunmen. Security forces managed to repel the attack without any reports of casualties or destruction of properties. Meanwhile, reports from local media suggested that during the assassination attempt, several blasts were heard all over the state.

On 24 January, the UN refugee agency revealed that at least 250 people have died since the initial outbreak of tribal clashes in January. Three humanitarian workers were among those who had been killed. Also, more than 100,000 people are believed to have been displaced, fleeing into neighboring Chad.

On 28 March, Al-Hilu, leader of SPLA-North, signed a peace agreement with the Sudanese government in Juba, South Sudan, which would guarantee freedom of religion in a civil, democratic Sudan that would also have a single unified army to protect national security.

On 5 April, fresh tribal clashes erupted in West Darfur's El Geneina, which led to the death of at least 40 people. During the three days of clashes, at least 58 people were also said to have been injured, according to the VOA News. Later in the evening, Sudan's defense council declared a state of emergency and also deployed troops to the troubled region of West Darfur state.

As of 6 April, the West Darfur State Doctors' Committee reported that the death toll had reached 50, with 132 others injured. According to the UN, reports suggest that there has been the destruction of humanitarian facilities, during the violence in the region. Also, the decision to declare a state of emergency in the region was applauded by the UN envoy for Sudan, Volker Perthes and he urged the government to ensure the protection of humanitarian organizations, so as to provide services to the victims of the violence.

On 7 April, 37 more deaths were recorded by the Sudanese doctors' committee in West Darfur, increasing the total death toll to 87.

On 8 April, the governor of the West Darfur, Mohamed Abdallah Douma stated in a news conference that at least 132 people had been killed during the days of unrest in the state. However, the Western Darfur State Doctors Committee has placed the death toll to be at least 125 during the sixth day of tribal clashes consecutively, with 208 others wounded.

The UN has called on the authorities to ensure that citizens are protected and that an immediate investigation of the clashes is launched. They also maintained that all the perpetrators of the violence must be held responsible, in order to attain justice for those affected during the clashes, including immediate deployment of security forces to the region.

On 12 April, following several days of violence in West Darfur that led to the deaths of at least 144 people, chairman of the ruling Transitional Sovereignty Council, Abdel Fattah al-Burhan, along with high-ranking security and military officials, visited Geneina, capital of West Darfur, where they held separate talks with the Arab Rizeigat and the non-Arab Masalit tribes. After the visit, the Dar Masalit Displaced People expressed their refusal to accept the result of the mediation headed by al-Burhan. They blamed the paramilitary Rapid Support Forces for the unrest in the region.

On 14 April, a statement released by the UN refugee agency confirmed that the violence in Geneina had stopped, based on reports which suggested that there haven't been any shootings for the past four days. The tribal clashes led to at least 1,860 people to flee into neighboring Chad, most of whom are believed to be women, children, and the elderly. Babar Baloch, a spokesman for the UN High Commissioner for Refugees (UNHCR) maintained that the refugees arriving revealed that their homes and properties were being destroyed.

On 28 April Sudanese security forces attempted to forcefully disperse a sit-in protest in Bielel, South Darfur. One woman was said to have been killed while at least eight others were wounded. Tear gas was said to have been used to disperse the crowd by a joint force from both the army and the police, including the firing of live rounds.

Meanwhile, at the secretariat of the state government in Nyala, protesters gathered in front of the building to protest against an attack on their village – Gassat Enjemet – which left three people dead and others wounded.

On 5 May, thousands of displaced people that were affected by the clashes in Geneina, requested to go back to their homes. They made the request due to the poor living conditions in their shelters.

On 29 May, a group of armed men reportedly opened fire in a market in West Darfur's Foro Baranga. As a result of the shooting, one person was said to have been killed, leaving five others seriously wounded. Protests erupted following the attack, with protesters setting many shops on fire and blocking all main roads leading to the town. According to Al Jazeera, some people threatened the doctors at the hospital to attend to their wounded patients and leave other patients.

On 5 June, clashes between the Arab Taisha and ethnic African Fallata tribes in Um Dafuq, South Darfur killed at least 36 people, with 37 others wounded. An aid worker who spoke anonymously revealed that the clash erupted as a result of a land dispute between the two conflicting parties. Subsequently, a certain state of calm was said to have been attained, following the deployment of more troops to Um Dafuk.

== Janjaweed's participation ==
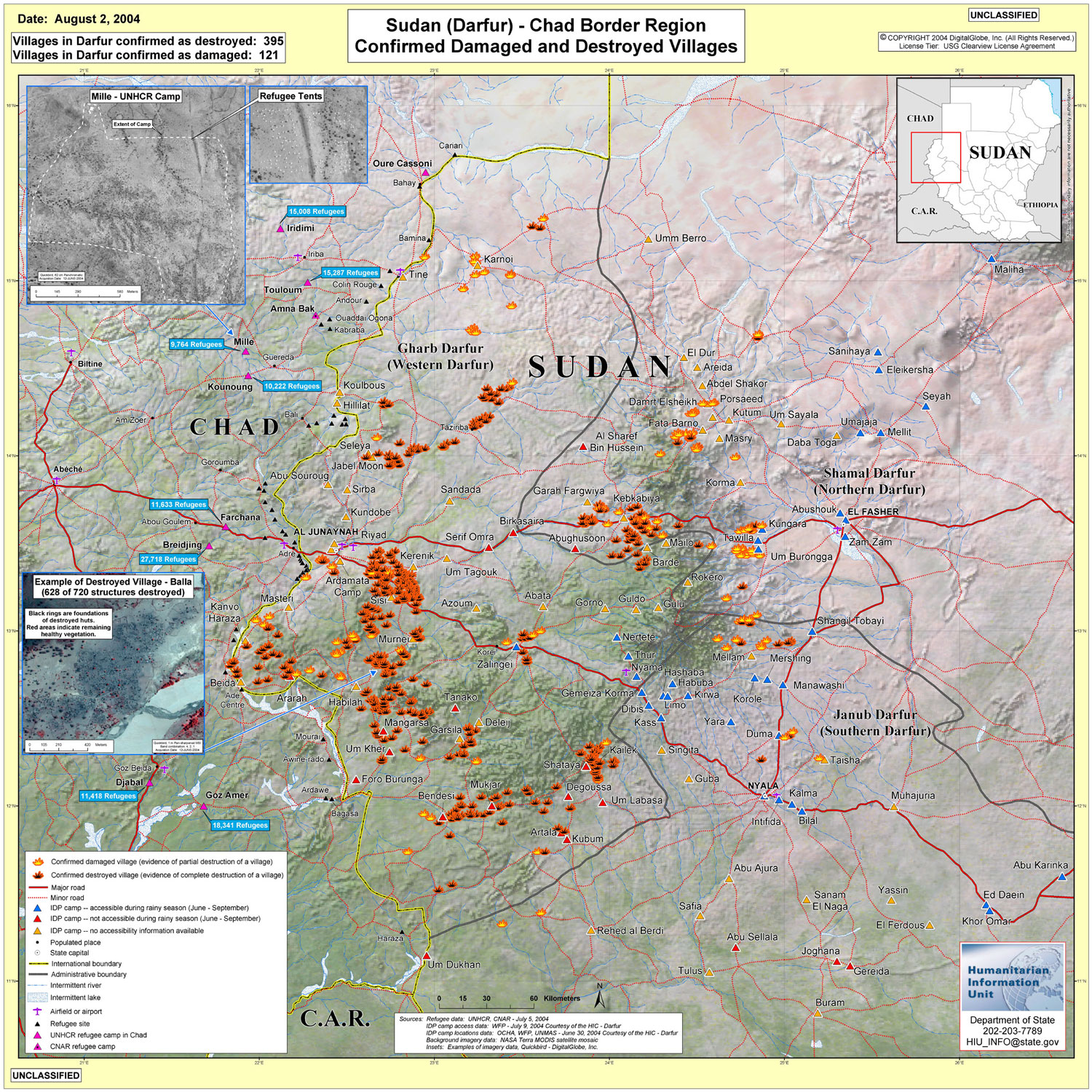
Destroyed villages (August 2004)

The well-armed Janjaweed quickly gained an advantage over rebel factions. By the spring of 2004, several thousand people – mostly from the non-Arab population – had been killed and as many as a million more had been driven from their homes, causing a major humanitarian crisis. The crisis took on an international dimension when over 100,000 refugees poured into neighboring Chad, pursued by militiamen who clashed with Chadian government forces along the border. More than 70 militiamen and 10 Chadian soldiers were killed in one gun battle in April. A United Nations observer team reported that non-Arab villages were singled out, while Arab villages were left untouched:

The 23 Fur villages in the Shattaya Administrative Unit have been completely depopulated, looted and burnt to the ground (the team observed several such sites driving through the area for two days). Meanwhile, dotted alongside these charred locations are unharmed, populated and functioning Arab settlements. In some locations, the distance between a destroyed Fur village and an Arab village is less than 500 meters.

A 2011 study examined 1,000 interviews with black African participants who fled from 22 village clusters to various refugee camps in 2003 and 2004. The study found: 1) the frequency of hearing racial epithets during an attack was 70% higher when it was led by the Janjaweed alone compared to official police forces; it was 80% higher when the Janjaweed and the Sudanese Government attacked together; 2) the risk of displacement was nearly 110% higher during a joint attack compared to when the police or Janjaweed acted alone, and 85% higher when Janjaweed forces attacked alone compared to when the attack was only perpetrated by government forces; 3) attacks on food and water supplies made it 129% more likely for inhabitants to be displaced compared to attacks that involved house burnings or killings; 4) perpetrators knew and took "special advantage" of the susceptibility of Darfur residents to attacks focused on basic resources. This vulnerability came against the backdrop of increased regional desertification.

== Violence against civilians ==
Violence against civilians was a defining feature of the conflict and included killings, torture, rape, abduction, looting, and extortion, much of it committed during attacks on villages. Surveys among displaced people in Murnei and Zalingei indicated that about one in twenty and one in fifty, respectively, had been killed during such attacks. Extrapolated over six months, these figures suggested approximately 3,700 deaths among those who fled to Murnei and 700 among those who reached Zalingei. Around 75% of those killed were men, and human rights organizations also documented several massacres.

Survivors described severe physical abuse, including beatings, deliberate gunshot wounds, attacks with whips and knives, branding, mutilation, and gang rape. Some attacks were carried out publicly in order to humiliate the victims. Civilians were also assaulted in and around displacement camps, particularly when leaving to collect water, firewood, fodder, or other necessities. Within the camps, insecurity was worsened by domestic violence and sexual exploitation by men who controlled access to essential resources.

Attackers frequently used racist insults such as "slaves", "blacks", "Nuba", but there were also threats free from racist or ethnic elements. The Janjaweed subjected their victims to extreme physical suffering and deliberate humiliation, leaving many deeply traumatized.

=== Rape of women and young girls ===
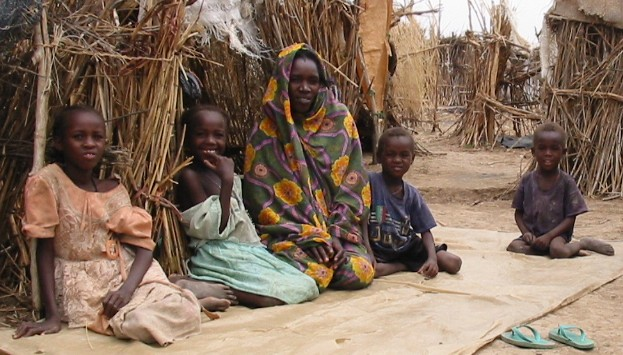
Internally displaced persons' camp

Immediately after the Janjaweed entered the conflict, the rape of women and young girls, often by multiple militiamen and often throughout entire nights, began to be reported at a staggering rate. Children as young as 2 years old were reported victims, while mothers were assaulted in front of their children. Young women were attacked so violently that they were unable to walk following the attack.

Non-Arab people were reportedly raped by Janjaweed militiamen as a result of the Sudanese government's goal of completely eliminating the presence of black Africans and non-Arabs from Darfur. The Washington Post Foreign Service interviewed verified victims of the rapes and recorded that Arabic terms such as "abid" and "zurga" were used, which mean slave and black. One victim, Sawelah Suliman, was told by her assailant, "Black girl, you are too dark. You are like a dog. We want to make a light baby." In an 88-page report, victims from Darfur have also accused the Rapid Support Forces of rape and assault as recently as 2015.

== Mortality estimates ==
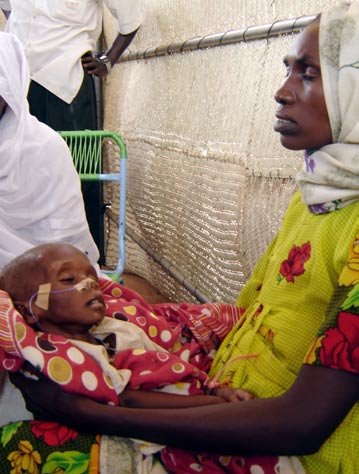
A mother with her sick baby at Abu Shouk IDP camp in North Darfur

Multiple casualty estimates have been published since the war began, ranging from roughly 10,000 civilians (Sudanese government estimate) to hundreds of thousands.

In September 2004, 18 months after the conflict began, the World Health Organization estimated that there had been 50,000 deaths in Darfur, mostly due to starvation. An updated estimate published the following month put the number of deaths for the 6-month period from March to October 2004 due to starvation and disease at 70,000; These figures were criticized because they only considered short periods and did not include deaths from violence. A more recent British Parliamentary Report estimated that over 300,000 people had died and others have published even higher death toll estimates.

In March 2005, the UN's Emergency Relief Coordinator Jan Egeland estimated that 10,000 people were dying each month, excluding deaths due to ethnic violence. An estimated 2.7 million people had at that time been displaced from their homes, mostly seeking refuge in camps in Darfur's major towns. Two hundred thousand had fled to neighboring Chad. Reports of violent deaths compiled by the UN indicate between 6,000 and 7,000 fatalities from 2004 to 2007.

In May 2005, the Centre for Research on the Epidemiology of Disasters (CRED) of the School of Public Health of the Université catholique de Louvain in Brussels, Belgium published an analysis of mortality in Darfur. Their estimate stated that from September 2003 to January 2005, between 98,000 and 181,000 persons died in Darfur, including 63,000 to 146,000 excess deaths.

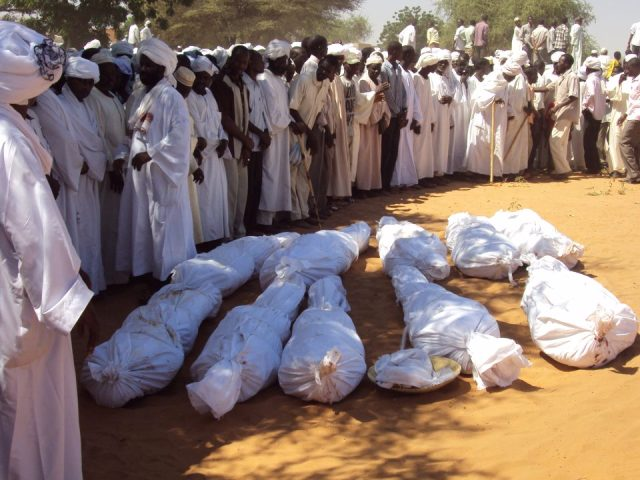
Victims of a massacre

In August 2010, Eric Reeves argued that total mortality from all violent causes, direct and indirect, at that point in the conflict, exceeded 500,000. His analysis took account of all previous mortality data and studies, including that by the Centre for Research on the Epidemiology of Disaster.

The UN disclosed on 22 April 2008 that it might have underestimated the Darfur death toll by nearly 50%.

In July 2009, The Christian Science Monitor published an op-ed stating that many of the published mortality rates have been misleading because they include a large number of people who had died of disease and malnutrition, as well as those who died from direct violence.

In January 2010, the Centre for Research on the Epidemiology of Disasters published an article in a special issue of The Lancet. The article, entitled "Patterns of mortality rates in Darfur conflict", estimated with 95% confidence that the excess number of deaths is between 178,258 and 461,520 (with a mean of 298,271), with 80% of these due to disease.

== International response ==
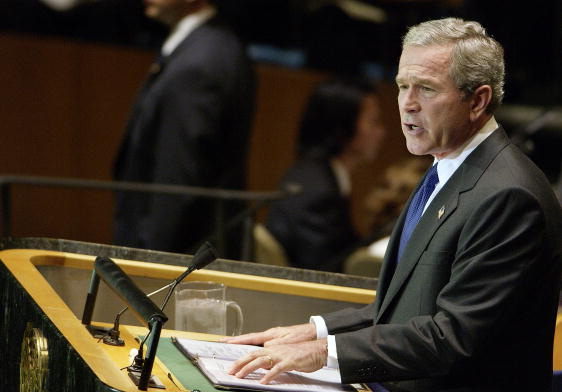
U.S. President George W. Bush speaking to the UN General Assembly on the crisis in Darfur, September 21, 2004

International attention to the Darfur genocide largely began with reports by Amnesty International in July 2003 and the International Crisis Group in December 2003. However, widespread media coverage did not start until the outgoing United Nations Resident and Humanitarian Coordinator for Sudan, Mukesh Kapila, called Darfur the "world's greatest humanitarian crisis" in March 2004. Organizations such as STAND: A Student Anti-Genocide Coalition, later under the umbrella of Genocide Intervention Network, and the Save Darfur Coalition emerged and became particularly active in the areas of engaging the United States Congress and President on the issue and pushing for divestment, initially launched by Adam Sterling under the auspices of the Sudan Divestment Task Force.

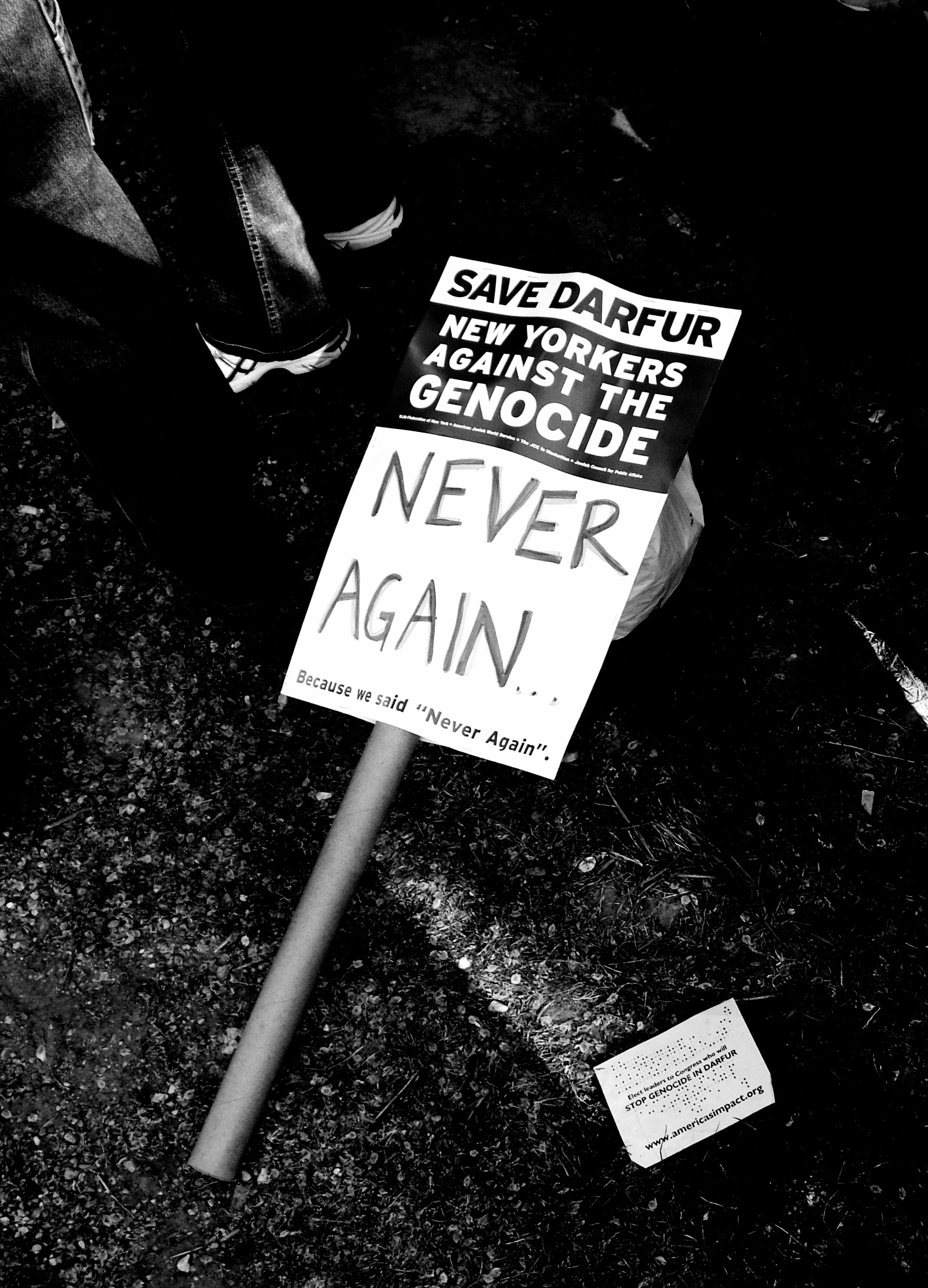
The Save Darfur Coalition advocacy group coordinated a large rally in New York in April 2006. Depicted here is a discarded protest sign littering the street.

In May 2009 the Mandate Darfur was canceled because the "Sudanese government is obstructing the safe passage of Darfurian delegates from Sudan." The Mandate was a conference that would have brought together 300 representatives from different regions of Darfur's civil society. The conference planned was to be held in Addis Ababa sometime in early May.

=== International Criminal Court ===
In March 2005, the UN Security Council formally referred the situation in Darfur to the Prosecutor of the International Criminal Court, taking into account the report of the International Commission of Inquiry on Darfur, authorized by United Nations Security Council Resolution 1564 of 2004, but without mentioning specific crimes. Two permanent members of the Security Council, the United States and China, abstained from the vote on the referral resolution.

In April 2007, the Judges of the International Criminal Court issued arrest warrants against the former Minister of State for the Interior, Ahmed Haroun, and a Janjaweed leader, Ali Kushayb, for crimes against humanity and war crimes. The Sudan Government said that the ICC had no jurisdiction to try Sudanese citizens and that it would not surrender the two men.

On 14 July 2008, the Prosecutor filed ten charges of war crimes against Sudan's incumbent President Omar al-Bashir, including three counts of genocide, five of crimes against humanity and two of murder. The Prosecutor claimed that Mr. al-Bashir "masterminded and implemented a plan to destroy in substantial part" three tribal groups in Darfur because of their ethnicity. Leaders from three Darfur tribes sued ICC prosecutor Luis Moreno Ocampo for libel, defamation, and igniting hatred and tribalism.

After an arrest warrant was issued for the Sudanese president in March 2009, the Prosecutor appealed to add genocide charges. However, the Pre-Trial Chamber found that there was no reasonable ground to support the contention that he had a specific intent to commit genocide (dolus specialis), which is an intention to destroy, in whole or in part, a protected group. The definition adopted by the Pre-Trial Chamber is the definition of the Genocide Convention, the Rome Statute, and some ICTY cases. On 3 February 2010 the Appeals Chamber of the ICC found that the Pre-Trial Chamber had applied "an erroneous standard of proof when evaluating the evidence submitted by the Prosecutor" and that the Prosecutor's application for a warrant of arrest on the genocide charges should be sent back to the Pre-Trial Chamber to review based on the correct legal standard. In July 2010, al-Bashir was charged with three counts of genocide in Darfur by the International Criminal Court for orchestrating the Darfur genocide.

Al-Bashir was the first incumbent head of state charged with crimes under the Rome Statute. He rejected the charges and said, "Whoever has visited Darfur, met officials and discovered their ethnicities and tribes ... will know that all of these things are lies."

It is expected that al-Bashir will not face trial in The Hague until he is apprehended in a nation which accepts ICC jurisdiction, as Sudan is not a party to the Rome Statute, which it signed but did not ratify. Payam Akhavan, a professor of international law at McGill University in Montreal and a former war crimes prosecutor, says although he may not go to trial, "He will effectively be in prison within the Sudan itself...Al-Bashir now is not going to be able to leave the Sudan without facing arrest." The Prosecutor warned that authorities could arrest the President if he enters international airspace. The Sudanese government has announced that the Presidential plane would be accompanied by jet fighters. However, the Arab League announced solidarity with al-Bashir. Since the warrant, he has visited Qatar and Egypt. The African Union also condemned the charges.

=== Foreign governments which supported the Sudanese government ===
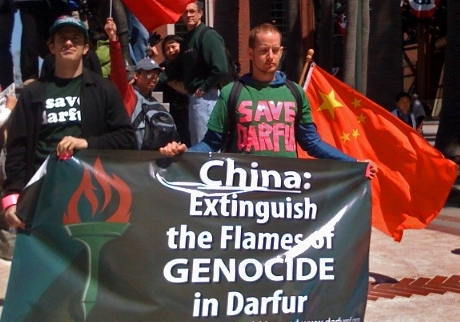
Protests against China's role in the Darfur conflict

Al-Bashir requested assistance from non-western countries after the West, led by America, imposed sanctions on his government. He said, "From the first day, our policy was clear: To look eastward, toward China, Malaysia, India, Pakistan, Indonesia, and even Korea and Japan, even if the Western influence upon some [of these] countries is strong. We believe that the Chinese expansion was natural because it filled the space left by Western governments, the United States, and international funding agencies. The success of the Sudanese experiment in dealing with China without political conditions or pressures encouraged other African countries to look toward China."

In 2007, Amnesty International issued a report accusing China and Russia of supplying arms, ammunition and related equipment to Sudan, some of which the government may have transferred to Darfur in violation of a UN arms embargo. The report claims that Sudan imported 10–20 combat aircraft from China in the early-mid-2000s, including three A-5 Fantan fighters that have been sighted in Darfur. The report provides evidence that the Sudan Air Force conducted indiscriminate aerial bombings of villages in Darfur and eastern Chad using ground attack fighters and repurposed Antonov transport planes. However, it does not specify whether the ground attack fighters in question are those purchased from China in the early-mid-2000s, and the Antonovs' origin remains unclear. The report also lists seven Soviet- or Russian-made Mi-24 Hind gunships that had been deployed to Darfur, though without specifying which country sold them to Sudan, or when. While noting that Russia sold arms worth tens of millions of dollars to Sudan in 2005 alone, the report does not specifically identify any weapons sold to Sudan by Russia after the outbreak of the Darfur conflict or after the imposition of the UNSC ban on arms transfers to Darfur, and it does not provide any evidence that any such weapons were deployed to Darfur.

The NGO Human Rights First claimed that over 90% of the light weapons currently being imported by Sudan and used in the conflict are from China. Human rights advocates and opponents of the Sudanese government portray China's role in providing weapons and aircraft as a cynical attempt to obtain oil, just as colonial powers once supplied African chieftains with the military means to maintain control as they extracted natural resources. According to China's critics, China threatened to use its veto on the U.N. Security Council to protect Khartoum from sanctions and was able to water down every resolution on Darfur in order to protect its interests. Accusations of the supply of weapons from China, which were then transferred to Darfur by the Sudanese government in violation of the UN arms embargo, continued in 2010.

Sarah Wykes, a senior campaigner at Global Witness, an NGO that campaigns for better natural resource governance, says: "Sudan has purchased about $100m in arms from China and has used these weapons against civilians in Darfur."

According to the report Following the Thread: Arms and Ammunition Tracing in Sudan and South Sudan, released in May 2014 by the Swiss research group Small Arms Survey, "Over the period 2001–12, Khartoum's reports to UN Comtrade reveal significant fluctuation in annual conventional arms imports. The majority of the Sudanese government's total self-reported imports of small arms and light weapons, their ammunition, and 'conventional weapons' over the period originated in China (58 per cent), followed by Iran (13 per cent), St. Vincent and the Grenadines (9 per cent), and Ukraine (8 per cent)." The report found that Chinese weapons were pervasive among most parties to the Sudanese conflicts, including the war in Darfur, but identified few if any weapons of Russian origin. (The section "Chinese weapons and ammunition" receives 20 pages in the report, whereas the only mention of Russian arms is to be found in the sentence "the majority of...mines [in South Sudan] have been of Chinese and Soviet/Russian origin.").

China and Russia denied the accusation by stating that they had not broken any UN sanctions. China has a close relationship with Sudan and increased its military co-operation with the government in early 2007. Because of Sudan's plentiful supply of oil, China considers good relations with Sudan to be a strategic necessity. China has direct commercial interests in Sudan's oil. China's state-owned company CNPC controls between 60 and 70 percent of Sudan's total oil production. Additionally, it owns the largest single share (40 percent) of Sudan's national oil company, Greater Nile Petroleum Operating Company. China consistently opposed economic and non-military sanctions on Sudan.

In March 2007, threats to boycott the Olympic games were made by French presidential candidate François Bayrou, in an effort to stop China's support. Sudan divestment efforts concentrated on PetroChina, the national petroleum company with extensive investments in Sudan.

=== Criticism of the international response ===
Gérard Prunier, a scholar specializing in African conflicts, argued that the world's most powerful countries have limited themselves to expressing concern and demand for the United Nations to take action. The UN, lacking initiative and will, initially left the African Union to deploy a token force without a mandate to protect civilians.

On 16 October 2006, Minority Rights Group (MRG) published a critical report, challenging that the UN and the great powers could have prevented the crisis and that few lessons appeared to have been drawn from the Rwandan genocide. MRG's executive director, Mark Lattimer, stated that: "this level of crisis, the killings, rape and displacement could have been foreseen and avoided ... Darfur would just not be in this situation had the UN systems got its act together after Rwanda: their action was too little too late." On 20 October 120 genocide survivors of The Holocaust, and the Cambodian and Rwandan genocides, backed by six aid agencies, submitted an open letter to the European Union, calling on them to do more, proposing a UN peacekeeping force as "the only viable option".

== Coverage by the media ==
Watchers of the Sky, a 2014 documentary by Edet Belzberg, interviews former journalist and United States Ambassador to the United Nations Samantha Power about the war in Darfur. Also featured is Luis Moreno Ocampo, former ICC jurist and lead prosecutor on the ICC investigation in Darfur. The Brutality of the militias, the violence which was used by the armed forces, the corruption and the human rights abuses were also shown on ER television series (e.g. episodes 12x19, 12x20), as well as in the 2007 documentaries They Turned Our Desert Into Fire and The Devil Came on Horseback.

== See also ==
- Abu Suruj
- Banu Hilal
- Bibliography of the Darfur conflict
- Breidjing Camp
- Chadian Civil War (2005–10)
- Command responsibility
- Dar Erenga
- Darfur genocide
- First Sudanese Civil War
- History of Darfur
- History of Sudan
- Human rights in Sudan
- Genocides in history
- Genocide of indigenous peoples
- List of civil wars
- List of conflicts in Africa
- List of ethnic cleansing campaigns
- List of famines
- List of ongoing armed conflicts
- List of wars 2003–present
- Lost Boys of Sudan
- Second Sudanese Civil War
- Slavery in Sudan
- Team Darfur

== Bibliography ==
- Bashir, Halima; Lewis, Damien (2009). Tears of the Desert: A Memoir of Survival in Darfur. One World. ISBN 978-0-345-51046-4.
- Burr, Millard; Collins, Robert O. (2008). Darfur: The Long Road to Disaster. Princeton, NJ: Markus Wiener Pub. ISBN 978-1-55876-470-5.
- Childers, Sam (2009). Another Man's War: The True Story of One Mans Battle to Save Children in the Sudan. Thomas Nelson Inc. ISBN 978-1-59555-162-7.
- Debos, Marielle (2016) [1st pub. 2013]. Living by the Gun in Chad. Combatants, Impunity and State Formation. Translated by Andrew Brown (Revised, Updated, and Translated ed.). London: Zed Books. ISBN 978-1-78360-532-3.
- Flint, Julie; de Waal, Alexander (2005). Darfur: A Short History of a Long War. Zed Books. ISBN 978-1-84277-696-4.
- Grzyb, Amanda F. (2010). The World and Darfur. Arts Insights. ISBN 978-0-7735-3729-3.
- Neville, Leigh (2018). Technicals: Non-Standard Tactical Vehicles from the Great Toyota War to modern Special Forces. Oxford, New York City: Osprey Publishing. ISBN 978-1-4728-2251-2.
