= Humanitarian Ceasefire Agreement =

2004 ceasefire between the Sudanese government and rebel groups in Darfur

- Type: Ceasefire
- Signed: April 8, 2004
- Effective: April 11, 2004
- Parties: Sudanese government; Justice and Equality Movement (JEM); Sudan Liberation Movement/Army (SLM/A)

Following the escalation of the Darfur conflict in Sudan, Chad-brokered negotiations in N'Djamena led to the Humanitarian Ceasefire Agreement between the Sudanese government and the two rebel groups, the Sudanese Justice and Equality Movement (JEM) and the Sudan Liberation Movement/Army (SLM/A) on 8 April 2004. Other signatories were Chad and the African Union. The ceasefire came into effect on 11 April 2004.

As part of the ceasefire, the Sudanese government agreed to disarm the Janjaweed militias that they influenced. However, this disarmament did not happen, and remained an unfulfilled promise through five more agreements after the HCA.

The National Movement for Reform and Development — a group which splintered from the JEM in April did not participate in the ceasefire talks or the agreement. Despite the ceasefire, Janjaweed and SLM/A attacks continued.

The African Union formed a Ceasefire Commission (CFC) to monitor observance of the ceasefire.
