= Ashma (disambiguation) =

Ashma is a long narrative poem of the Sani people.

Ashma may also refer to:

- Ashma, Sudan, a village
- Ashma Kumari KC (born 1998), a Nepali model
