= Abu Gamra =

Town in Sudan

Abu Gamra is a town in Sudan. It was attacked by Sudanese forces during 2003–2004 in the Darfur conflict.
