= El Fasher airport attack (2003) =

- Part of War in Darfur
Date	April 25, 2003
Location	El Fasher, North Darfur, Sudan 13°37′20″N 25°19′46″E
Result	Rebel victory

Belligerents
Sudan: SAF	JEM SLA

Strength
Unknown	33 Land Cruisers

Casualties and losses
75 killed Several military airplanes destroyed 35 Prisoners	9-20 killed

The El Fasher airport attack was an attack conducted by the Sudanese Liberation Army (SLA) and the Justice and Equality Movement (JEM) on the Airport of El Fasher in North Darfur, Sudan. The attack happened on 25 April 2003, and was considered the first large rebel attack in the Darfur war alongside the Battle of Tina. SLA managed to control the airport for several hours and the attack killed 70 government soldiers.

== Background ==
The War in Darfur is considered to have begun on 21 July 2001, when members of the Fur and Zaghawa ethnic groups gathered to swore oaths on the Quran to make fight against the government sponsored attacks in Darfur. The war was preceded by decades of low-level conflict with the pastoral and the farming tribes of Darfur. Fur and Arab tribes had fought from 1987 to 1989 over grazing rights and land ownership Before the airport attack in El Fasher SLA and JEM had operated on a much smaller scale and the attacks hadn't prompted a large response from the Government of Sudan (GOS). Janjaweed raids were infrequent as the rebels conducted only small attacks usually targeting villages.

== The attack ==
On the morning of 25 April 2003, around 33 rebel land cruisers entered the El Fasher airport. The attack, which was conducted by joint SLA and JEM forces, quickly overrun the airport as the Sudanese Armed Forces (SAF) weren't prepared for a full-scale attack. According to the government, the attack destroyed four Antonov bombers while the rebels claimed to have destroyed seven. The rebels managed to control the airport for a few hours before retreating. The rebels killed around 75 soldiers and took 35 soldiers as prisoners. According to the rebels, only 9 rebels were killed but the government claimed to have killed around 20 rebels.

== Aftermath ==
After the attack the Government of Sudan (GOS) and members of the Popular Defence Front (PDF) agreed to ramp up the counter insurgency campaign against the rebels. The counter insurgency campaign was conducted by proxy militias with the support of Sudanese air and ground forces. In late April 2003 Government funded Janjaweed forces conducted attacks targeting the Masalit killing around 55 people. The attack on El Fasher is considered the start of the Darfur Genocide as attacks and raids by Janjaweed forces ramped up significantly after the airport attack. The counter-insurgency attacks resulted in the deaths of around 300,000 civilians and displacement of 2 million Sudanese.
