= Battle of Tina (2003) =

The Battle of Tina
- Part of War in Darfur
Date	March 25, 2003
Location	Tina, North Darfur, Sudan
Result	Rebel victory

Belligerents
Sudan: SAF	SLA

Casualties and losses
- At least One Government official killed Unknown number of civilian deaths Military equipment captured

The Battle of Tina occurred on 25 March 2003, When the Sudanese Liberation Army (SLA) seized the town of Tina in North Darfur, Sudan. SLA captured the garrison town and managed to hold it for a while, capturing large stocks of weapons and equipment.

== Background ==
The war in Darfur began around 2001 when the Darfur Liberation Front (DLF) which later changed its name to the Sudanese Liberation Army, started attacking villages and towns in Darfur. On February 26. 2003, around 300 SLA rebels led by Abdul Wahid al-Nur seized the town of Gulud. This attack led the Government of Sudan (GOS) to open up negotiations with the SLA about a ceasefire. The implemented ceasefire fell through on March 18, when Janjaweed militias funded by the GOS killed a Masalit leader and Sudanese Armed Forces (SAF) attacked the town of Karnoi with helicopter gunships.

== Battle of Tina ==
On 25 March 2003, the SLA retaliated by attacking the garrison town of Tina near the border with Chad. The rebels attacked the border town killing a government customs official and looting the customs office gaining weapons and military equipment in the process. The attack lead to the 5,000 inhabitants of Tina to flee across the border to Chad. The Battle of Tina and The attack on the El Fasher airport lead to GOS start and counter-insurgency operation in Darfur. The operation which mostly utilised government funded proxy militias is considered as the start of the Darfur genocide.
