= Sarah Wykes =

British human rights activist

Director of Corruption Watch Limited
- Incumbent
- Assumed office 20 July 2015

Personal details
- Born: July 1965; York, Yorkshire, England

Sarah Wykes is a British human rights activist. Wykes was born in York in July 1965 and had her early upbringing there. She has a PhD in Hispanic Studies from London University. She worked with Amnesty International for Corporate accountability and has been part of Oxfam.

She was accused of violating the national security of Angola and arrested on the morning of 18 February 2007 in Cabinda, the northern oil-rich exclave separated from the rest of the country by the Democratic Republic of the Congo. She was released on bail on 21 February 2007 but was required to remain in a hotel while investigations continued. She was eventually freed and returned to the UK in March 2007.

== Early life ==
Wykes was born in York in July 1965 and had her early upbringing there. She has a MA and PhD in Hispanic Studies from London University. She worked with Amnesty International for Corporate accountability and has been part of Oxfam. As of 2015, Dr. Wykes was the Director of Corruption Watch Limited based out of London, from 20 July 2015. In collaboration with New Academy of Business, she developed a training course on business and human rights. She was part of Oxfam campaigns and also worked as a researcher in Business and Human Rights Resource Centre. She was an academic at the University of London in the field of Hispanic Studies.

== Arrest in Angola ==
Wykes is an anti-corruption researcher and involved herself in the research of transparency in oil sector for Global Witness, an international NGO. She arrived with another person in Angola, a nation rich in oil reserves, but 95 per cent of the country's population living below the poverty line. The government has been criticized for mismanagement and many independent organizations including the International Monetary Fund sought independent investigation into the accounts. Cabinda is a region in Angola that produced 1.5 million barrels of petrol every day. Wyke arrived to Angola on 11 February and her passport was confiscated the next day and her personal belongings like camera, notepad and computer memory stick were seized.

An unspecified crime against state security was quoted as the reason of the arrest. She was left on bail three days later and was allowed to return to Britain, while the investigation continued in Angola. At the time of arrest on 18 February 2007, she was discussing the issue of revenue transparency with the leaders in Cabinda. Global Witness demanded access to her lawyers, immediate and unconditional release, an apology for ill-treating her from the Angolan Government. They also wanted the UK Government and international actors in Angola to expedite her release.
