= Ashma, Sudan =

Ashma
- Village
- Location in Sudan
- Coordinates: 12°2′11″N 24°52′37″E
- Country: Sudan
- State: South Darfur

Ashma is a village, 8 km (5.0 mi) from the South Darfur state capital Nyala in the south-west of Sudan.

== History ==
During the Darfur conflict, on 8 Apr 2013, the Agence France-Presse news agency reported that the Sudan Liberation Movement/Army (Minni Minnawi) rebels took Ashma village.

On February 21, 2017, as a farmer and his sister returned from working on their lands in Ashma, two herders attacked them, a relative of the victims reported to Radio Dabanga. The man managed to stab one of the assailants before the other shot him. A group of locals traced the perpetrators, seized them and handed them over to the police in Bileil. The family member said that herders have abducted two other farmers from Ashma in retaliation of the arrests.

On July 23, 2019, a farmer was killed by a land mine.
