= National Movement for Reform and Development =

The National Movement for Reform and Development (NMRD) is a Sudanese rebel group based in the region of Darfur. The group was formed when it broke away from the Justice and Equality Movement in March 2004. NMRD mostly consists of ethnic Zaghawas. The NMRD came into existence because of a split between the political lead of JEM and the field commanders, who felt that they had no influence politically. The NMRD signed a cease-fire agreement with the government of Sudan in December 2004. In the agreement, the parties agreed to a mutual exchange of prisoners of war and allowing aid groups to deliver relief to local citizens. It had support from persons living along a stretch of the Sudan–Chad border. Although its force was small, it resumed military operations against the government in 2005.

The political secretary of NMRD is Khalil Abdallah and sanctioned Colonel Gibril Abdul Kareem Barey leads the group.

On July 20, 2005, NMRD and Sudanese government representatives, led by Sharif Omar Badur, met in Al Fasher in northern Darfur to discuss ways of furthering cooperation in a United Nations and African Union monitored meeting.

On January 28, 2006, NMRD attacked a Sudanese military base in Arm Yakui in western Darfur, killing 78 soldiers and taking 17 prisoners. The Sudan People's Armed Forces killed two, and injured five rebels, saying the attack "came suddenly from inside Chadian territory, and we returned fire with the same force using artillery."
