= Outline of prehistoric technology =

Overview of and topical guide to prehistoric technology

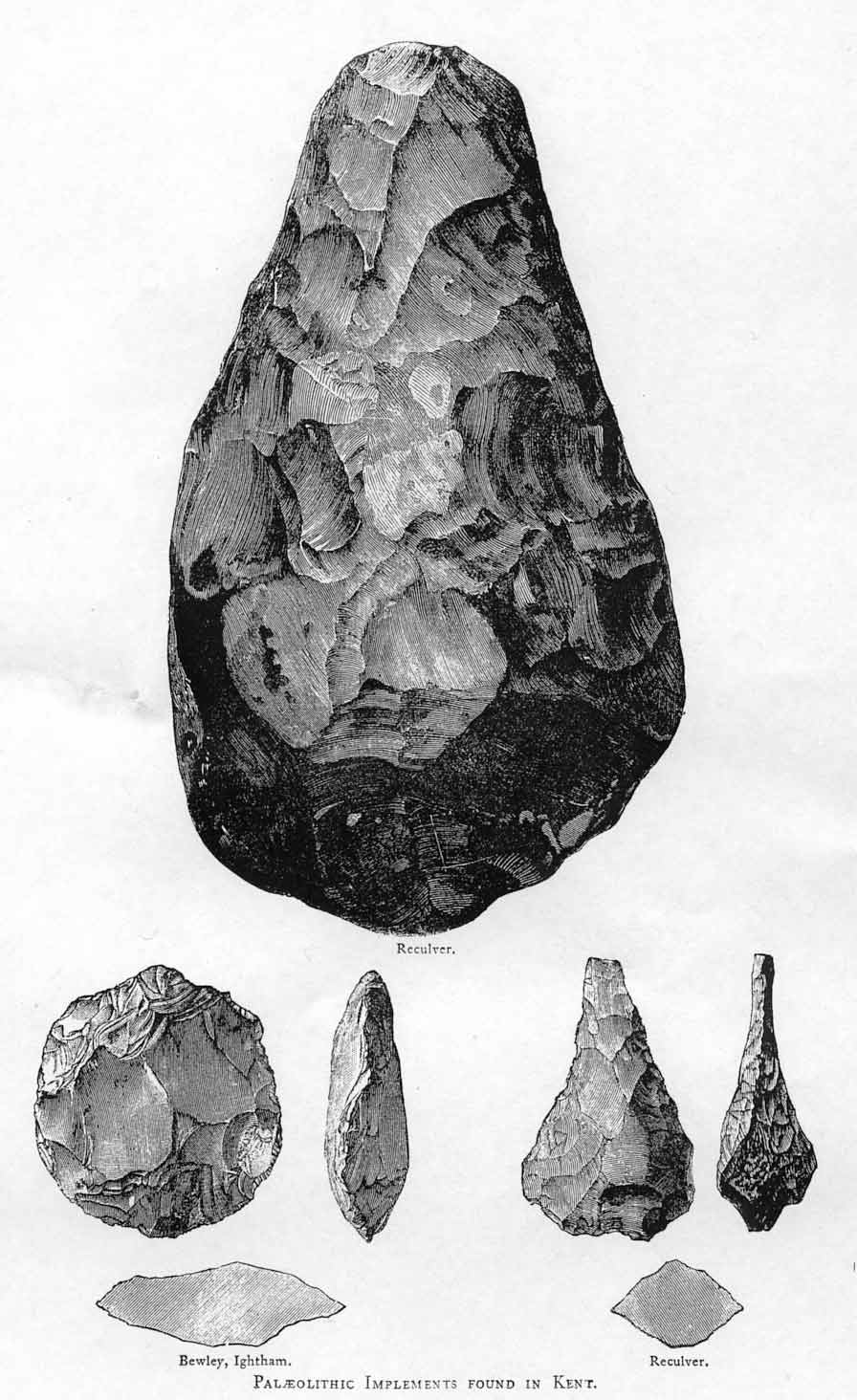
Acheulean hand axes from Kent. The types shown are (clockwise from top) cordate, ficron and ovate. It was the longest-used tool of human history.

The following outline is provided as an overview of and topical guide to prehistoric technology.

Prehistoric technology – technology that predates recorded history. History is the study of the past using written records; it is also the record itself. Anything prior to the first written accounts of history is prehistoric (meaning "before history"), including earlier technologies. About 2.5 million years before writing was developed, technology began with the earliest hominids who used stone tools, which they may have used to start fires, hunt, cut food, and bury their dead.

== Nature of prehistoric technology ==
Hominin timeline
← / Earlier apes; ← / Gorilla split; ← / Chimpanzee split; ← / Earliest bipedal; ← / Earliest sign of Ardipithecus; ← / Earliest sign of Australopithecus; ← / Earliest stone tools; ← / Earliest sign of Homo; ← / Dispersal beyond Africa; ← / Earliest fire / cooking; ← / Earliest rock art; ← / Earliest clothes; ← / Modern humans
(million years ago)

Prehistoric technology can be described as:

- Prehistoric – "before we had written records," from the Latin word for "before," præ. Prehistory is the span of time before recorded history, that is, before the invention of writing systems.
- Technology – making, modification, usage, and knowledge of tools, machines, techniques, crafts, systems, and methods of organization, in order to solve a problem, improve a preexisting solution to a problem, achieve a goal, handle an applied input/output relation or perform a specific function.

== Old World prehistoric technology ==
- Three-age system – in archaeology and physical anthropology, the periodization of human prehistory into three consecutive time periods, each named after the main material used in its respective tool-making technologies: the Stone Age, the Bronze Age, and the Iron Age.
- Beginning of prehistoric technology – the earliest technology began (2.5 million years) before recorded history, that is, at the beginning of the Stone Age.
- Latest prehistoric technology – the level of technology reached before true writing was introduced differed by region (and usually included proto-writing)...
  - Latest prehistoric technology in the Near East – cultures in the Near East achieved the development of writing first, during their Bronze Age.
  - Latest prehistoric technology in the rest of the Old World: Europe, India, and China reached Iron Age technological development before the introduction of writing there.

=== Stone Age technology in the Old World ===
- Stone Age – broad prehistoric period, lasting roughly 2.5 million years, during which stone was widely used in the manufacture of implements with a sharp edge, a point, or a percussion surface. The period began with hominids and ended between 6000 and 2000 BCE with the advent of metalworking.

==== Paleolithic technology ====
- Paleolithic – prehistoric period of human history distinguished by the development of the most primitive stone tools discovered (Grahame Clark's Modes I and II), and covers roughly 99% of human technological prehistory.

==== Lower Paleolithic technology ====
- Lower Paleolithic – earliest subdivision of the Paleolithic or Old Stone Age. It spans the time from around 2.5 million years ago when the first evidence of craft and use of stone tools by hominins appears in the current archaeological record, until around 300,000 years ago, spanning the Oldowan ("mode 1") and Acheulean ("mode 2") lithic technology.
  - Stone tool use – early human (hominid) use of stone tool technology, such as the hand axe, was similar to that of primates, which is found to be limited to the intelligence levels of modern children aged 3 to 5 years. Ancestors of homo sapiens (modern man) used stone tools as follows:
    - Homo habilis ("handy man") – first "homo" species. It lived from approximately 2.3 to 1.4 million years ago in Africa and created stone tools called Oldowan tools.
    - Homo ergaster – in eastern and southern Africa about 2.5 to 1.7 million years ago, it refined Oldowan tools and developed the first Acheulean bifacial axes.
    - Homo erectus ("upright man") – lived about 1.8 to 1.3 million years ago in West Asia and Africa and is thought to be the first hominid to hunt in coordinated groups, use complex tools, and care for infirm or weaker companions.
    - Homo antecessor – earliest hominid in Northern Europe. It lived from 1.2 million to 800,000 years ago and used stone tools.
    - Homo heidelbergensis – lived between 600,000 and 400,000 years ago and used stone tool technology similar to the Acheulean tools used by Homo erectus.
  - Control of fire by early humans – European and Asian sites dating back 1.5 million years ago seem to indicate controlled use of fire by H. erectus. A northern Israel site from about 690,000 to 790,000 years ago suggests controlled use of fire in a hearth from pre-existing natural fires or embers.
  - Burial – the act of placing a deceased person into the ground.
    - Homo heidelbergensis – may have been the first species to bury their dead about 500,000 years ago.

==== Middle Paleolithic technology ====
- Middle Paleolithic period – in Europe and the Near East during which the Neanderthals lived (c. 300,000–28,000 years ago). Their technology is mainly the Mousterian. The earliest evidence (Mungo Man) of settlement in Australia dates to around 55,000 years ago when modern humans likely crossed from Asia by island-hopping. The Bhimbetka rock shelters exhibit the earliest traces of human life in India, some of which are approximately 30,000 years old.
  - Homo neanderthalensis
    - Stone tools – homo neanderthalensis used Mousterian stone tools that date back to around 300,000 years ago and include smaller, knife-like and scraper tools.
    - Burials – homo neanderthalensis buried their dead, doing so in shallow graves along with stone tools and animal bones, although the reasons and significance of the burials are disputed.
  - Homo sapiens – the only living species in the genus Homo originated in Africa about 200,000 years ago. Greater mental capability and ability to walk erect provided freed hands for manipulating objects, which allowed for far greater use of tools.
    - Art of the Middle Paleolithic
    - Burial – intentional burial, particularly with grave goods, may be one of the earliest detectable forms of religious practice since it may signify a "concern for the dead that transcends daily life." The earliest undisputed human burial so far dates back 130,000 years. Human skeletal remains stained with red ochre were discovered in the Skhul cave at Qafzeh, Israel with a variety of grave goods.

==== Upper Paleolithic Revolution ====
- Upper Paleolithic Revolution – theoretical occurrence between 60,000 and 30,000 years ago, possibly the origin of language, resulting in modern human behavior, accompanied radical advancements in technology made possible by it.
  - Behavioral modernity – a set of traits that distinguish Homo sapiens from extinct hominid lineages. Homo sapiens reached full behavior modernity around 50,000 years ago due to a highly developed brain capable of abstract reasoning, language, introspection, and problem solving.
  - Tools – included Aurignacian tools, such as stone bladed tools, tools made of antlers, and tools made of bones.
  - Clothing – evidence, such as possible sewing needles from around 40,000 years ago and dyed flax fibers dated 36,000 BP found in a prehistoric cave in the Republic of Georgia suggest that people were wearing clothes at this time. Human beings may have begun wearing clothing as far back as 190,000 years ago.
  - Art of the Upper Paleolithic – included cave painting, sculpture such as the Venus figurines, carvings and engravings of bone and ivory, and musical instruments such as flutes. The most common subject matter was large animals that were hunted by the people of the time.
    - Prehistoric music
      - Paleolithic flutes
    - Cave painting
      - Cave of Altamira and Paleolithic Cave Art of Northern Spain
      - Côa Valley Paleolithic Art

==== Mesolithic technology ====
- Mesolithic – the transitional period between the Paleolithic hunter-gatherers, beginning with the Holocene warm period around 11,660 BP and ending with the Neolithic introduction of farming, the date of which varied in each geographical region. Adaptation was required during this period due to climate changes that affected environment and the types of available food.
  - Stone tool changes – small stone tools called Microliths, including small bladelets and microburins, emerged during this period.
  - Weapons – spears or arrows were found at the earliest known Mesolithic battle site at Cemetery 117 in the Sudan. Holmegaard bows were found in the bogs of Northern Europe dating from the Mesolithic period.

==== Neolithic Revolution ====
- Neolithic Revolution – first agricultural revolution, representing a transition from hunting and gathering nomadic life to an agriculture existence. It evolved independently in six separate locations worldwide circa 10,000–7000 years BP (8,000–5,000 BC). The earliest known evidence exists in the tropical and subtropical areas of southwestern/southern Asia, northern/central Africa and Central America.
  - Defining characteristics
    - Introduction of agriculture – a defining characteristic of Neolithic societies, which resulted in a swing from a nomadic lifestyle to one that was more sedentary, and the use of agricultural tools such as the plough, digging stick and hoe (tool).
    - Domestication – of animals, including dogs
    - Pottery – emerged as a defining characteristic of the Neolithic period.
  - Other
    - Architecture – included houses and villages built of mud-brick and wattle and daub and the construction of storage facilities, tombs and monuments.
    - Metalworking – copper use began as early as 9000 BC in the Middle East; and a copper pendant found in northern Iraq dated to 8700 BCE. The Old Copper complex in North America's Great Lakes region lasted from 7500 to 1000 BC.
    - Numeric counting – record keeping evolved from a system of counting using small clay tokens that began in Sumer about 8000 BCE.
    - Proto-writing – ideographic and/or early mnemonic symbols used to convey information, probably devoid of direct linguistic content. These systems emerged in the early Neolithic period, as early as the 7th millennium BCE.
      - Neolithic signs in Europe
        - Vinča signs (Tărtăria tablets), ca. 5300 BCE
      - Neolithic signs in China – at a range of Neolithic sites in China, small numbers of symbols of either pictorial or simple geometric nature have been unearthed which were incised into or drawn or painted on artifacts, mostly on pottery but in some instances on turtle shells, animal bones or artifacts made from bone or jade.
        - Jiahu symbols, carved on tortoise shells in Jiahu, ca. 6600 BC
    - Stone tools – ground and polished tools were created during the Neolithic period.
    - Religious structures – such as the Göbekli Tepe built about 12,000 years ago.
    - Wheel – in the late Neolithic period, the wheel was introduced for making pottery.

=== Prehistoric Bronze Age technology in the Old World ===
- Bronze Age – stage of development characterized by the use of copper and its alloy bronze as the chief hard materials in the manufacture of some implements and weapons and of developing trade networks.
    - Bronze Age China
    - Bronze Age India
        - Early Indus script, ca. 3500 BC
    - Bronze Age Europe

=== Prehistoric Iron Age technology in the Old World ===
- Iron Age – age characterized by the widespread use of iron or steel, which coincided with other changes in society, including differing agricultural practices, religious beliefs and artistic styles.
  - Tools – best tools and weapons were made from steel.

=== End of prehistory and the beginning of history ===
- Development of true writing systems – in the Old World, true writing systems developed from neolithic writing in the Early Bronze Age (4th millennium BC). The Sumerian archaic (proto-cuneiform) writing and the Egyptian hieroglyphs are generally considered the earliest true writing systems, both emerging out of their ancestral proto-literate symbol systems from 3400–3200 BC with earliest coherent texts from about 2600 BC.

==== Transition from proto-writing to true writing ====
- General developmental stages leading from proto-writing to true writing:
  - Picture writing system: glyphs directly represent objects and ideas or objective and ideational situations. In connection with this the following substages may be distinguished:
    1. The mnemonic: glyphs primarily a reminder;
    2. The pictographic (pictography): glyphs represent directly an object or an objective situation such as (A) chronological, (B) notices, (C) communications, (D) totems, titles, and names, (E) religious, (F) customs, (G) historical, and (H) biographical;
    3. The ideographic (ideography): glyphs represent directly an idea or an ideational situation.
  - Transitional system: glyphs refer not only to the object or idea which it represents but to its name as well.
  - Phonetic system: glyphs refer to sounds or spoken symbols irrespective of their meanings. This resolves itself into the following substages:
    1. The verbal: glyph (logogram) represents a whole word;
    2. The syllabic: glyph represent a syllable;
    3. The alphabetic: glyph represent an elementary sound.

== Prehistoric technology of the Americas ==
The New World periods began with the crossing of the Paleo-Indians, Athabaskan, Aleuts, Inuit, and Yupik peoples along the Bering Land Bridge onto the North American continent. In their book, Method and Theory in American Archaeology, Gordon Willey and Philip Phillips defined five cultural stages for the Americas, including the three prehistoric Lithic, Archaic and Formative stages. The historic stages are the Classic and Post-Classic stages.

- Paleo-Indian period – the first people who entered, and subsequently inhabited, the Americas during the final glacial episodes of the late Pleistocene period. Evidence suggests big-game hunters crossed the Bering Strait from Asia into North America over a land and ice bridge (Beringia), that existed between 45,000 BCE – 12,000 BCE, following herds of large herbivores far into Alaska.
- Athabaskan-speakers
- Aleuts
- Inuit
- Yup'ik

=== Lithic technology ===
- Lithic technology – occurred from 12,000 to 6,000 years before present and included the Clovis culture, Folsom tradition and Plano culture. Clovis culture was once considered the first culture to use projectile points to hunt on the North American continent. Since then, a pre-Clovis site was found in Manis, Washington that found use of projectile points to hunt mastodons.

=== Archaic period technology ===
- Archaic – was dated from 8,000 to 2,000 years before present. People were hunters of small game, such as deer, antelope and rabbits, and gatherers of wild plants, moving seasonally to hunting and gathering sites. Late in the Archaic period, about 200-500 CE, corn was introduced into the diet and pottery-making became an occupation for storing and carrying food.

=== Formative stage technology ===
- Formative stage – followed the Archaic period and continued until the point of contact by European people. Cultures from that period include that of the Ancient Pueblo People, Mississippian culture and Olmec cultures.

== Prehistoric technologies by type ==
=== Primitive skills ===
- Primitive skills

==== Prehistoric art ====
- Prehistoric art – art produced in preliterate, prehistorical cultures beginning somewhere in very late geological history, and generally continuing until that culture either develops writing or other methods of record-keeping, or makes significant contact with another culture that has, and that makes some record of major historical events.
  - List of Stone Age art
  - Types of prehistoric art
    - Parietal art
      - Rock art
        - Cave painting
    - Prehistoric sculpture
      - Venus figurines
    - Stone circle
  - Prehistoric art by region
    - Japanese Prehistoric Art
    - Scottish art in the Prehistoric era

==== Domestication of animals ====
- Origin of the domestic dog

==== Language / numbers ====
- Language itself
  - Origin of language
- Prehistoric numerals

==== Prehistoric fishing ====
- History of whaling#Prehistoric to medieval times
- History of fishing#Prehistory

==== Prehistoric hunting ====
- Hunting#Paleolithic
  - Game drive system
  - Hunting hypothesis

==== Prehistoric mining ====
- Mining#Prehistoric mining

==== Prehistoric medicine ====
- Prehistoric medicine
- Dentistry#History

=== Prehistoric tools ===
- Timeline of historic inventions#Prehistoric
- History of materials science#Prehistory
- Archaeological industry
  - Oldowan
  - Mousterian
  - Acheulean

==== Prehistoric clothing ====
- History of clothing and textiles#Prehistoric development
- Shoe#History

==== Stone Age tools ====
- Biface
- Hand axe
- Control of fire by early humans
- Bone tool
- Spear#Prehistory
- Prepared-core technique
- Blade (archaeology)
- Chopper (archaeology)
- Cleaver (tool)
- Tool stone
- Lithic flake
- Lithic core
- Lithic reduction
- Tranchet flake
- Langdale axe industry
- Bow and arrow#History
- Chopping tool
- Cupstone
- Bann flake
- Bare Island projectile point, just a few of many kinds of projectile points
- Canaanean blade
- Celt (tool)
- Adze#Europe
- Anvil#History
- Arrow#History
- Sewing needle#Needles in archaeology
- Basket#History
- Pigment#History
- Glue#History
- Rope#History
- Bow drill#History
- Woodworking#History

==== Prehistoric weapons ====
- Prehistoric warfare
  - Prehistoric weapons

== Gallery ==
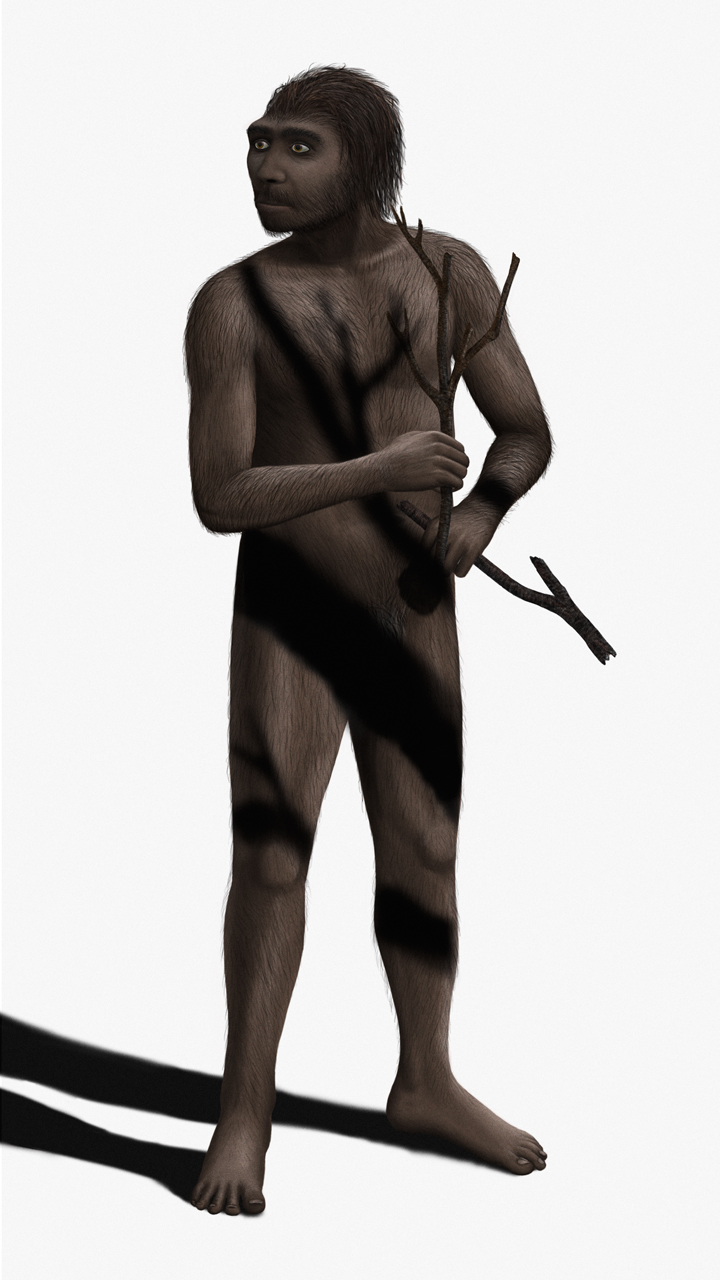
Reconstruction of how homo erectus may have looked

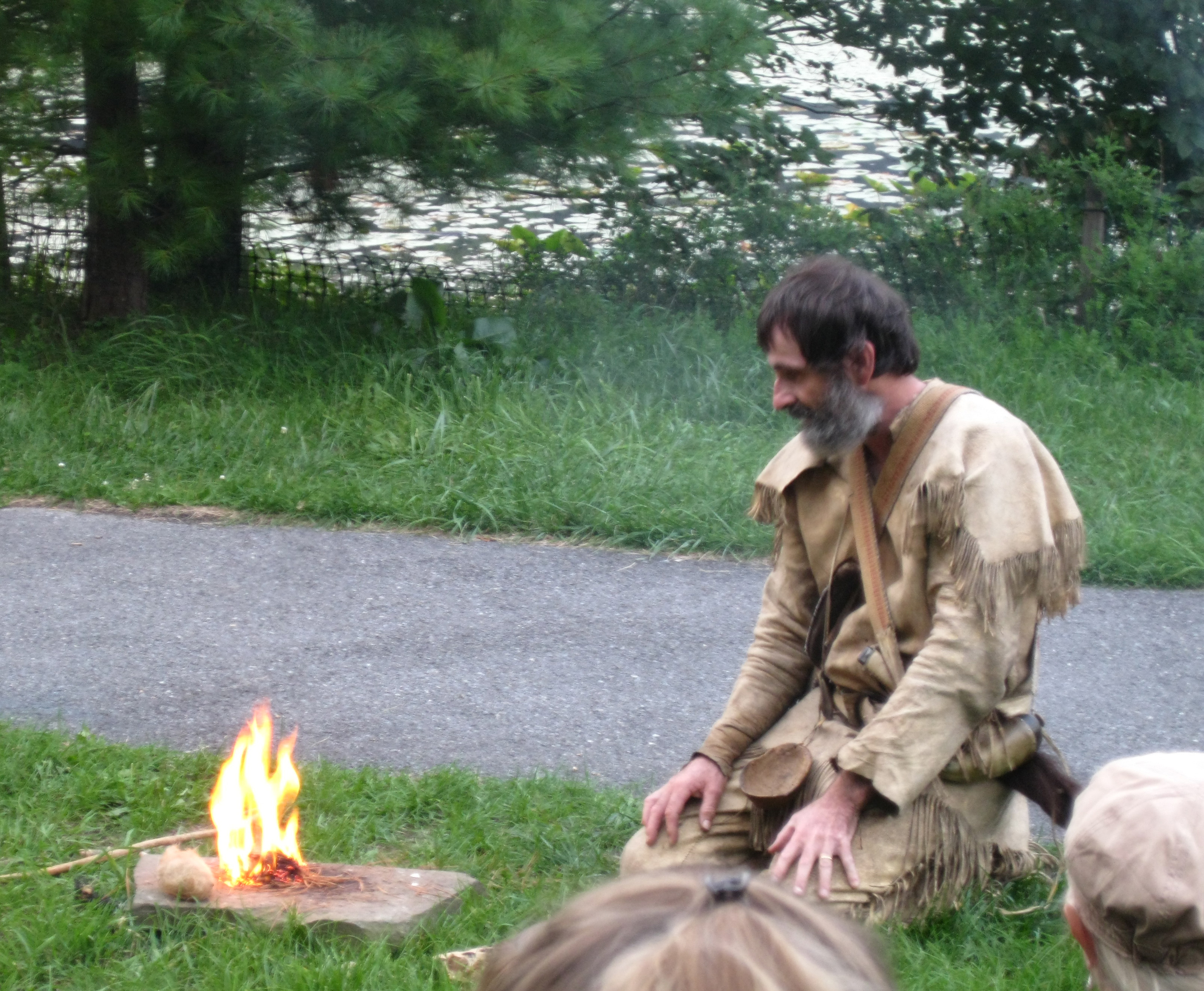
Fire started using a bow drill

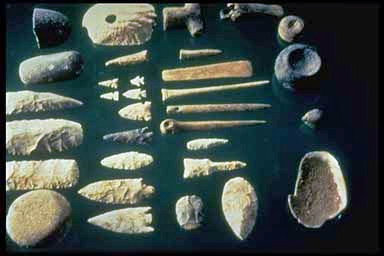
Selection of prehistoric tools

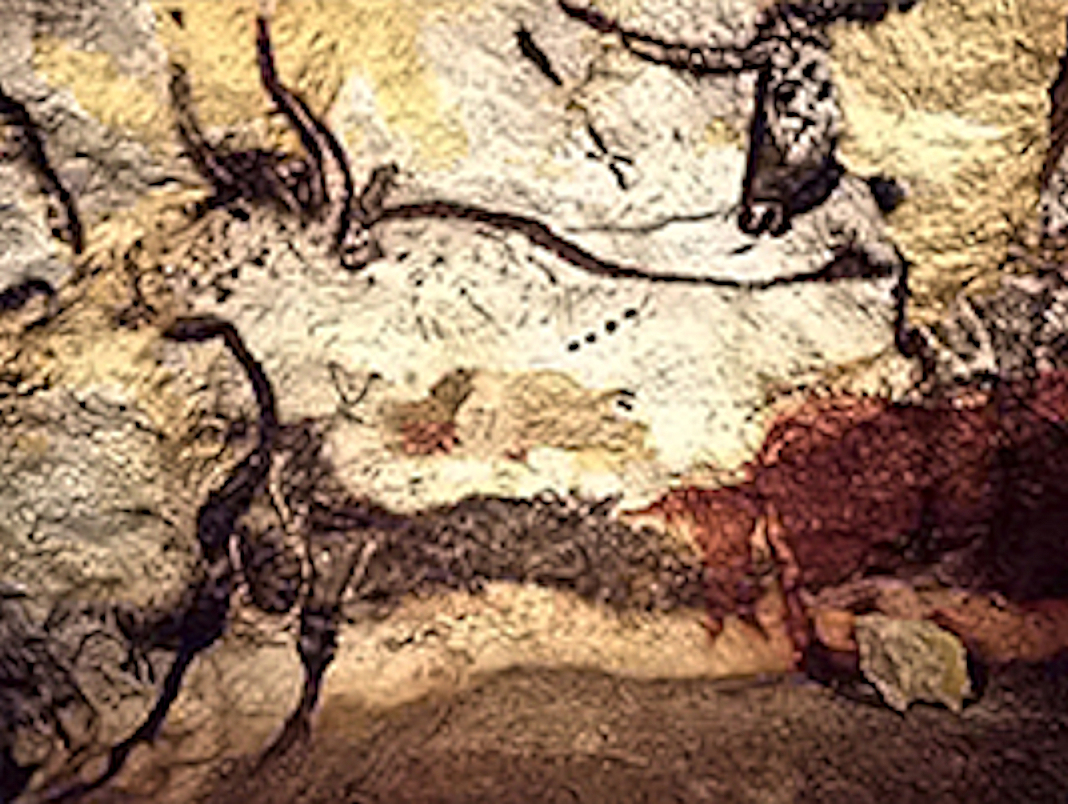
Aurochs on a cave painting in Lascaux, France

== See also ==
- Aboriginal stone arrangement
- Paleolithic diet
- Prehistoric Autopsy (2012 BBC documentary)
- Timeline of human prehistory
