= Prehistoric technology =

Technology that predates recorded history

Prehistoric technology is technology that predates recorded history. History is the study of the past using written records. Anything prior to the first written accounts of history is prehistoric, including earlier technologies. About 2.5 million years before writing was developed, technology began with the earliest hominids who used stone tools, which they first used to hunt food, and later to cook.

There are several factors that made the evolution of prehistoric technology possible or necessary. One of the key factors is behavioral modernity of the highly developed brain of Homo sapiens capable of abstract reasoning, language, introspection, and problem-solving. The advent of agriculture resulted in lifestyle changes from nomadic lifestyles to ones lived in homes, with domesticated animals, and land farmed using more varied and sophisticated tools. Art, architecture, music and religion evolved over the course of the prehistoric periods.

== Old World ==
Hominin timeline
← / Earlier apes; ← / Gorilla split; ← / Chimpanzee split; ← / Earliest bipedal; ← / Earliest sign of Ardipithecus; ← / Earliest sign of Australopithecus; ← / Earliest stone tools; ← / Earliest sign of Homo; ← / Dispersal beyond Africa; ← / Earliest fire / cooking; ← / Earliest rock art; ← / Earliest clothes; ← / Modern humans
(million years ago)

=== Stone Age ===
The Stone Age is a broad prehistoric period during which stone was widely used in the manufacture of implements with a sharp edge, a point, or a percussion surface. The period lasted roughly 2.5 million years, from the time of early hominids to Homo sapiens in the later Pleistocene era, and largely ended between 6000 and 2000 BCE with the advent of metalworking.

The Stone Age lifestyle was that of hunter-gatherers who traveled to hunt game and gather wild plants, with minimal changes in technology. As the last glacial period of the current ice age neared its end (about 12,500 years ago), large animals like the mammoth and bison antiquus became extinct and the climate changed. Humans adapted by maximizing the resources in local environments, gathering and eating a wider range of wild plants and hunting or catching smaller game. Domestication of plants and animals with early stages in the Old World (Afro-Eurasia) Mesolithic and New World (Americas) Archaic periods led to significant changes and reliance on agriculture in the Old World Neolithic and New World Formative stage. The agricultural life led to more settled existences and significant technological advancements. (Note: During the Paleolithic Age, archaic humans had a lifestyle which involved limited use of tools and few permanent settlements. The first major technologies, then, were tied to survival, hunting, and food preparation in this environment. Fire, stone tools and weapons, and clothing were technological developments of major importance during this period. Stone Age cultures developed music, and engaged in organized warfare. A subset of Stone Age humans, including Ngaro Aborigines, developed ocean-worthy outrigger canoe technology, leading to an eastward migration across the Malay Archipelago, across the Indian ocean to Madagascar and also across the Pacific Ocean, which required knowledge of the ocean currents, weather patterns, sailing, celestial navigation, and star maps. The early Stone Age is described as Epipalaeolithic or Mesolithic. The former is generally used to describe the early Stone Age in areas with limited glacial impact. The later Stone Age, during which the rudiments of agricultural technology were developed, is called the Neolithic period. During this period, polished stone tools were made from a variety of hard rocks such as flint, jade, jadeite and greenstone, largely by working exposures as quarries, but later the valuable rocks were pursued by tunnelling underground, the first steps in mining technology. The polished axes were used for forest clearance and the establishment of crop farming, and were so effective as to remain in use when bronze and iron appeared.)

Although Paleolithic cultures left no written records, the shift from nomadic life to settlement and agriculture can be inferred from a range of archaeological evidence. Such evidence includes ancient tools, cave paintings, and other prehistoric art, such as the Venus of Willendorf. Human remains also provide direct evidence, both through the examination of bones, and the study of mummies. Though concrete evidence is limited, scientists and historians have been able to form significant inferences about the lifestyle and culture of various prehistoric peoples, and the role technology played in their lives.

==== Lower Paleolithic ====
The Lower Paleolithic period was the earliest subdivision of the Paleolithic or Old Stone Age. It spans the time from around 2.5 million years ago when the first evidence of craft and use of stone tools by hominids appears in the current archaeological record, until around 300,000 years ago, spanning the Oldowan ("mode 1") and Acheulean ("mode 2") lithic technology.

Early humans (hominids) used stone tool technology, such as a hand axe that was similar to that used by primates, which are found to have intelligence levels of modern children aged 3 to 5 years. Intelligence and use of technology did not change much for millions of years. The first "Homo" species began with Homo habilis about 2.4 to 1.5 million years ago. Homo habilis ("handy man') created stone tools called Oldowan tools. Homo ergaster lived in eastern and southern Africa about 2.5 to 1.7 million years ago and used more diverse and sophisticated stone tools than its predecessor, Homo habilis, including having refined the inherited Oldowan tools and developed the first Acheulean bifacial axes.

Homo erectus ("upright man") lived about 1.8 to 1.3 million years ago in West Asia and Africa and is thought to be the first hominid to hunt in coordinated groups, use complex tools, and care for infirm or weaker companions. Homo antecessor the earliest hominid in Northern Europe lived from 1.2 million to 800,000 years ago and used stone tools. Homo heidelbergensis lived between 600,000 and 400,000 years ago and used stone tool technology similar the Acheulean tools used by Homo erectus.

European and Asian sites dating back 1.5 million years ago seem to indicate controlled use of fire by Homo erectus. A northern Israel site from about 690,000 to 790,000 years ago suggests that man could light fires. Homo heidelbergensis may have been the first species to bury their dead about 500,000 years ago.

==== Middle Paleolithic ====
The Middle Paleolithic period occurred in Europe and the Near East, during which the Neanderthals lived (c. 300,000–28,000 years ago). The earliest evidence (Mungo Man) of settlement in Australia dates to around 40,000 years ago when modern humans likely crossed from Asia by island-hopping. The Bhimbetka rock shelters exhibit the earliest traces of human life in India, some of which are approximately 30,000 years old.

Homo neanderthalensis used Mousterian Stone tools that date back to around 300,000 years ago and include smaller, knife-like and scraper tools. They buried their dead in shallow graves along with stone tools and animal bones, although the reasons and significance of the burials are disputed.

Homo sapiens, the only living species in the genus Homo, originated in Africa about 200,000 years ago. As compared to their predecessors, Homo sapiens had a more complex brain structure, which provided better coordination for manipulating objects and far greater use of tools. There was art created during this period. Intentional burial, particularly with grave goods, may be one of the earliest detectable forms of religious practice since it may signify a "concern for the dead that transcends daily life." The earliest undisputed human burial so far dates back 130,000 years. Human skeletal remains stained with red ochre were discovered in the Skhul cave at Qafzeh, Israel with a variety of grave goods.

==== Upper Paleolithic Revolution ====
During the Upper Paleolithic Revolution, advancements in human intelligence and technology changed radically with the advent of behavioral modernity between 60,000 and 30,000 years ago. Behavioral modernity is a set of traits that distinguish Homo sapiens from extinct hominid lineages. Homo sapiens reached full behavioral modernity around 50,000 years ago due to a highly developed brain capable of abstract reasoning, language, introspection, and problem-solving.

Aurignacian tools, such as stone-bladed tools, tools made of antlers, and tools made of bones were created during this period. People began creating clothing. What appear to be sewing needles were found around 40,000 years ago and dyed flax fibers dated 36,000 BP were found in a prehistoric cave in the Republic of Georgia. Human beings may have begun wearing clothing as far back as 190,000 years ago. Poisoned weapons are a hallmark of advanced hunter-gatherer technology. Traces of toxic plant alkaloids on microlithic arrowheads in KwaZulu-Natal, South Africa, dated to 60,000 years ago.

Cultural aspects emerged, such as art of the Upper Paleolithic period, which included cave painting, sculpture such as the Venus figurines, carvings and engravings of bone and ivory. The most common subject matter was large animals that were hunted by the people of the time. The Cave of Altamira and Paleolithic Cave Art of Northern Spain and Côa Valley Paleolithic Art are examples of such artwork. Musical instruments such as flutes emerged during this period.

==== Mesolithic period ====
The Mesolithic period was a transitional era between the Paleolithic hunter-gatherers, beginning with the Holocene warm period around 11,660 BP and ending with the Neolithic introduction of farming, the date of which varied in each geographical region. Adaptation was required during this period due to climate changes that affected environment and the types of available food.

Small stone tools called microliths, including small bladelets and microburins, emerged during this period. For instance, spears or arrows were found at the earliest known Mesolithic battle site at Cemetery 117 in the Sudan. Holmegaard bows were found in the bogs of Northern Europe dating from the Mesolithic period. These microliths point to the use of projectile technology since they are widely assumed to have formed the tips and barbs of arrows. This is demonstrated by mesolithic assemblages found in southwest Germany, which revealed two types of projectiles used: arrows with transverse, trapezoidal stone tips and large barbed antler "harpoons". These implements indicate the nature of human adaptation to the environment during the period, describing the Mesolithic societies as hunter-gatherers.

==== Neolithic Revolution ====
The Neolithic Revolution was the first agricultural revolution, representing a transition from hunting and gathering nomadic life to an agriculture existence. It evolved independently in six separate locations worldwide circa 10,000–7,000 years BP (8,000–5,000 BC). The earliest known evidence exists in the tropical and subtropical areas of southwestern/southern Asia, northern/central Africa and Central America.

There are some key defining characteristics. The introduction of agriculture resulted in a shift from nomadic to more sedentary lifestyles, and the use of agricultural tools such as the plough, digging stick and hoe made agricultural labor more efficient. Animals were domesticated, including dogs. Another defining characteristic of the period was the emergence of pottery, and, in the late Neolithic period, the wheel was introduced for making pottery.

Neolithic architecture included houses and villages built of mud-brick and wattle and daub and the construction of storage facilities, tombs and monuments. Copper metalworking was employed as early as 9000 BC in the Middle East; and a copper pendant found in northern Iraq dated to 8700 BC. Ground and polished stone tools continued to be created and used during the Neolithic period.

Numeric record keeping evolved from a system of counting using small clay tokens that began in Sumer about 8000 BC.

=== Bronze Age ===
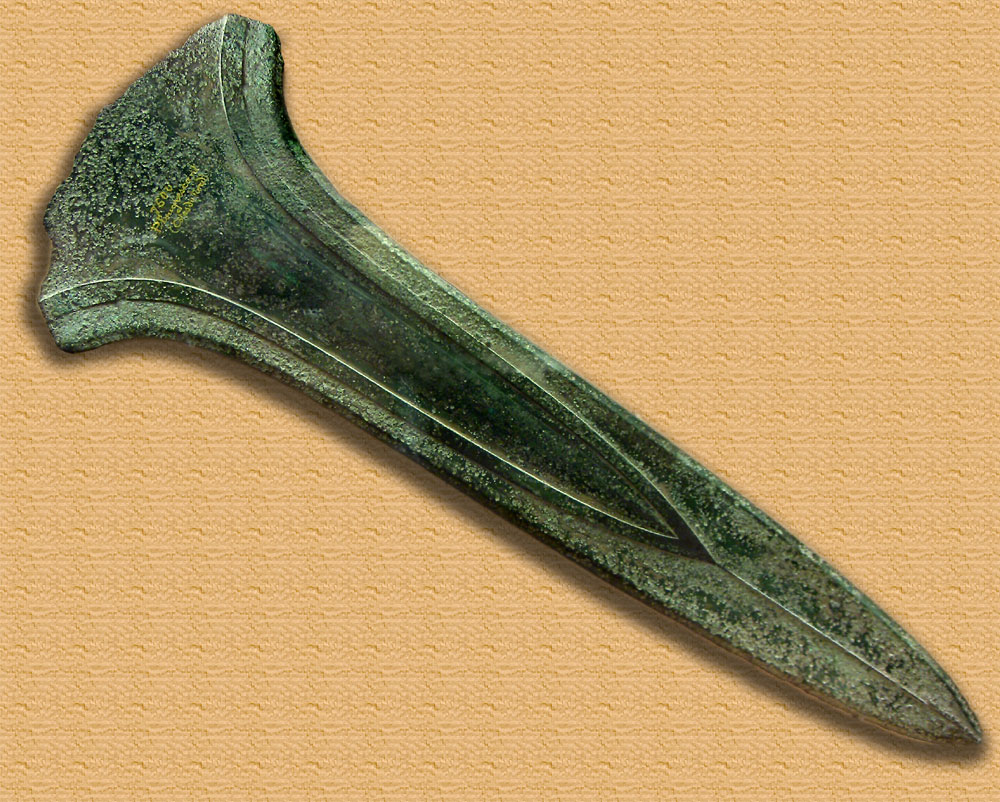
A late Bronze Age sword or dagger blade.

The Stone Age developed into the Bronze Age after the Neolithic Revolution. The Neolithic Revolution involved radical changes in agricultural technology which included development of agriculture, animal domestication, and the adoption of permanent settlements.

The Bronze Age is characterised by metal smelting of copper and its alloy bronze, an alloy of tin and copper, to create implements and weapons. Polished stone tools continued to be used due to their abundance compared with the less common metals (especially tin).

This technological trend apparently began in the Fertile Crescent, and spread outward.

=== Iron Age ===
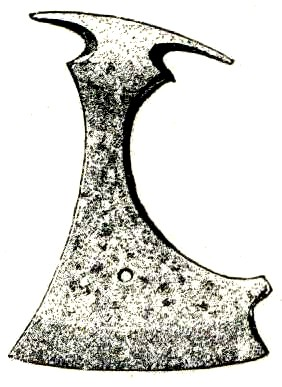
An axehead made of iron, dating from Swedish Iron Age.

The Iron Age involved the adoption of iron or steel smelting technology, either by casting or forging. Iron replaced bronze, and made it possible to produce tools which were stronger, lighter and cheaper to make than bronze equivalents. The best tools and weapons were made from steel.

Other societal changes often accompanied the introduction of iron, including practice changes in art, religion and agriculture. The Iron Age ends with the beginning of the historic periods, generally marked by the development of written language that enabled creation of historic records.

The timing of the adoption of iron depended upon "the availability of iron ore and the state of knowledge". Iron was smelted in Egypt about 6000 B.C. and iron replaced bronze in the Middle East about 1500 B.C. Chinese began casting iron about 5000 B.C. and their methods for casting iron was the precursor to modern steel manufacturing methods. Most of Asia, however, did not adopt production of iron until the historic period.

In Europe, iron was introduced about 1100 B.C. and had replaced bronze for creating weapons and tools by 500 B.C. They made iron through the forging smelting process and integrated casting in the Middle Ages. Large hill forts or oppida were built either as a refuge in time of war, or sometimes as permanent settlements. Agricultural practices were made more efficient with more effective and varied iron tools.

Iron was extracted from metal ore starting about 2000 B.C. in Africa.

== New World ==
The New World periods began with the crossing of the Paleo-Indians, Athabaskan, Aleuts and Eskimos along the Bering Land Bridge onto the North American continent.

The Paleo-Indians were the first people who entered, and subsequently inhabited, the Americas during the final glacial episodes of the late Pleistocene period. Evidence suggests big-game hunters crossed the Bering Strait from Asia into North America over a land and ice bridge (Beringia), that existed between 45,000 BCE – 12,000 BCE, following herds of large herbivores far into Alaska.

In their book, Method and Theory in American Archaeology, Gordon Willey and Philip Phillips defined five cultural stages for the Americas, including the three prehistoric Lithic, Archaic and Formative stages. The historic stages are the Classic and Post-Classic stages.

=== Lithic ===
The Lithic period occurred from 12,000 to 6,000 years before present and included the Clovis, Folsom and Plano cultures. Clovis culture was considered the first culture to use projectile points to hunt on the North American continent. Since then, a pre-Clovis site was found in Manis, Washington that found use of projectile points to hunt mastodons.

=== Archaic ===
The Archaic period in the Americas was dated from 8,000 to 2,000 years before present. People were hunters of small game, such as deer, antelope and rabbits, and gatherers of wild plants, moving seasonally to hunting and gathering sites. Late in the Archaic period, about 200-500 A.D., corn was introduced into the diet and pottery-making became an occupation for storing and curing food.

=== Formative ===
The Formative stage followed the Archaic period in the Americas and continued until there was contact by European people. Some of the cultures from that period include that of the Ancient Pueblo People, Mississippian culture and Olmec cultures.

Cultures of the Formative Stage are supposed to possess the technologies of pottery, weaving, and developed food production. Social organization is supposed to involve permanent towns and villages, as well as the first ceremonial centers. Ideologically, an early priestly class or theocracy is often present or in development.

== Gallery ==
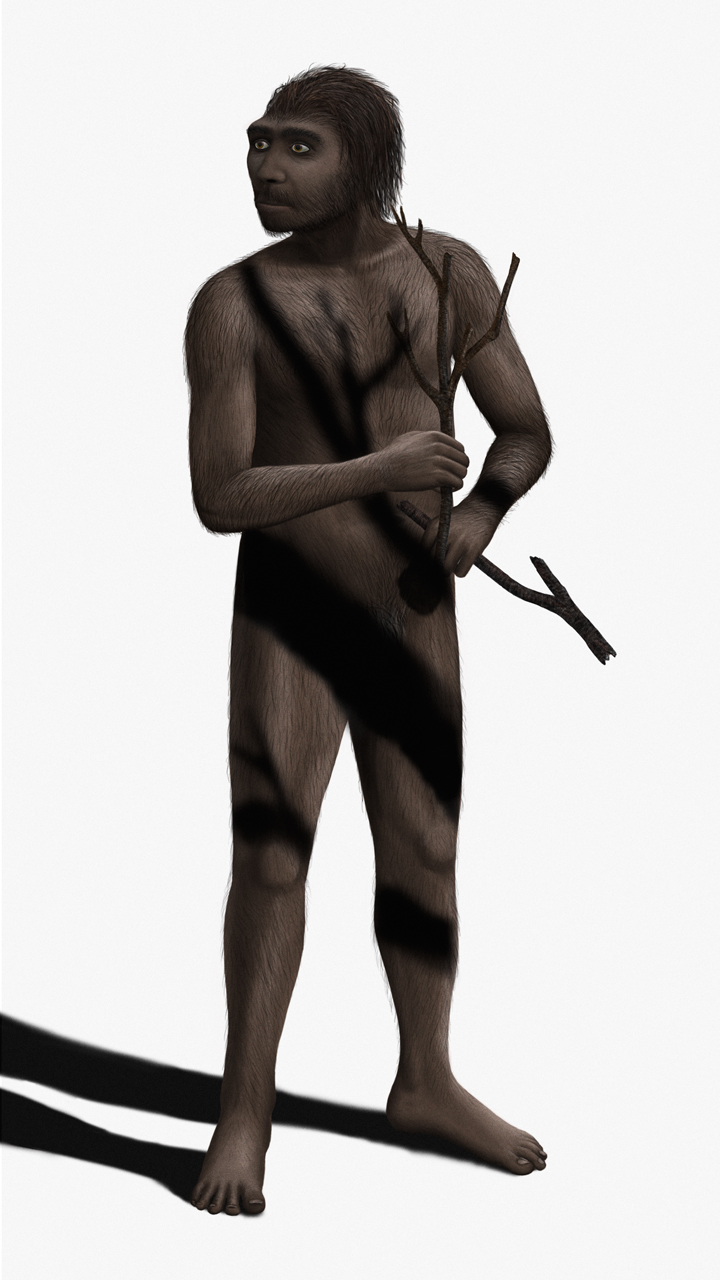
Reconstruction of how Homo erectus may have looked

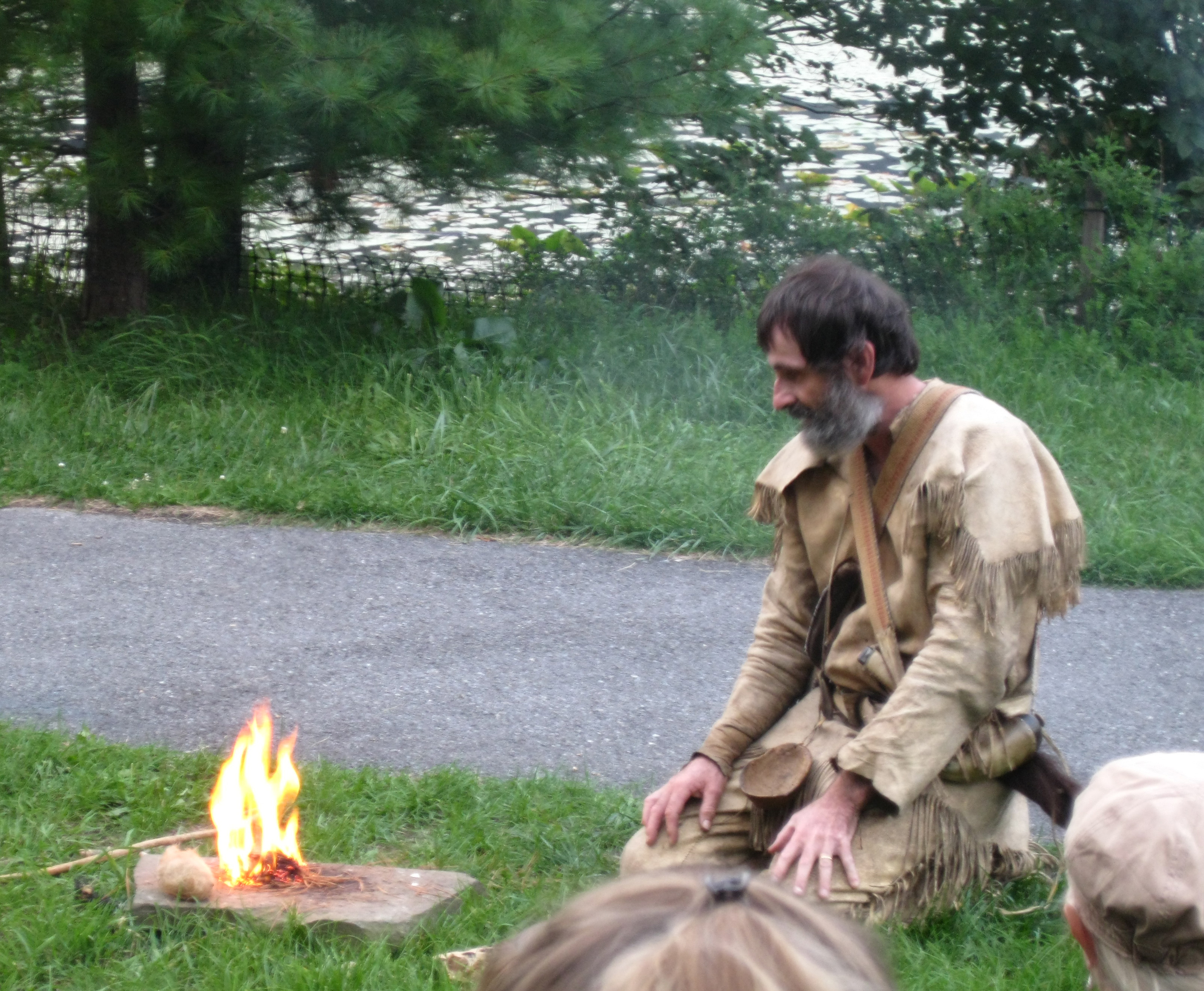
Fire started using a bow drill

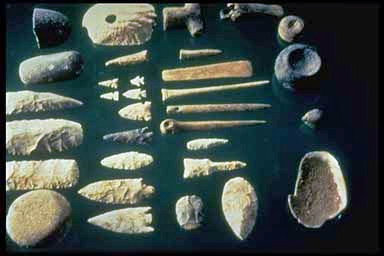
Selection of prehistoric tools

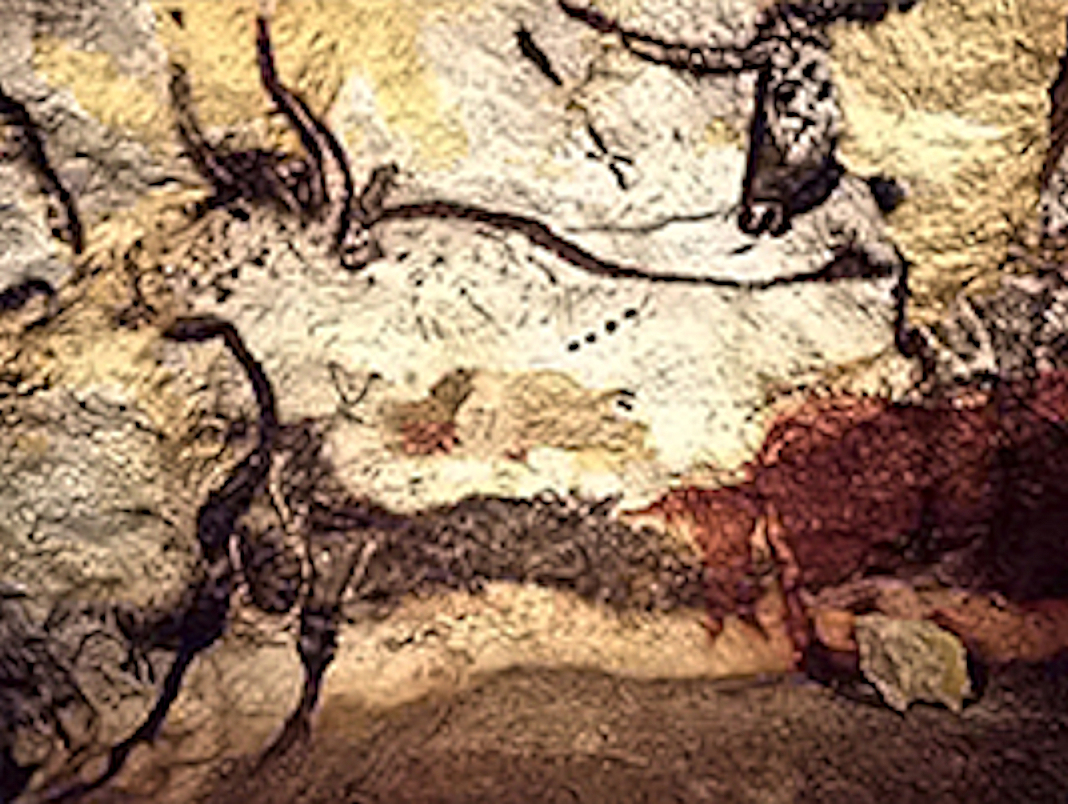
Aurochs on a cave painting in Lascaux, France

== See also ==
- List of Stone Age art
- Timeline of prehistory
