= Nataruk =

Archaeological site in Turkana County, Kenya

Coordinates: 2.70661°N 36.14191°E

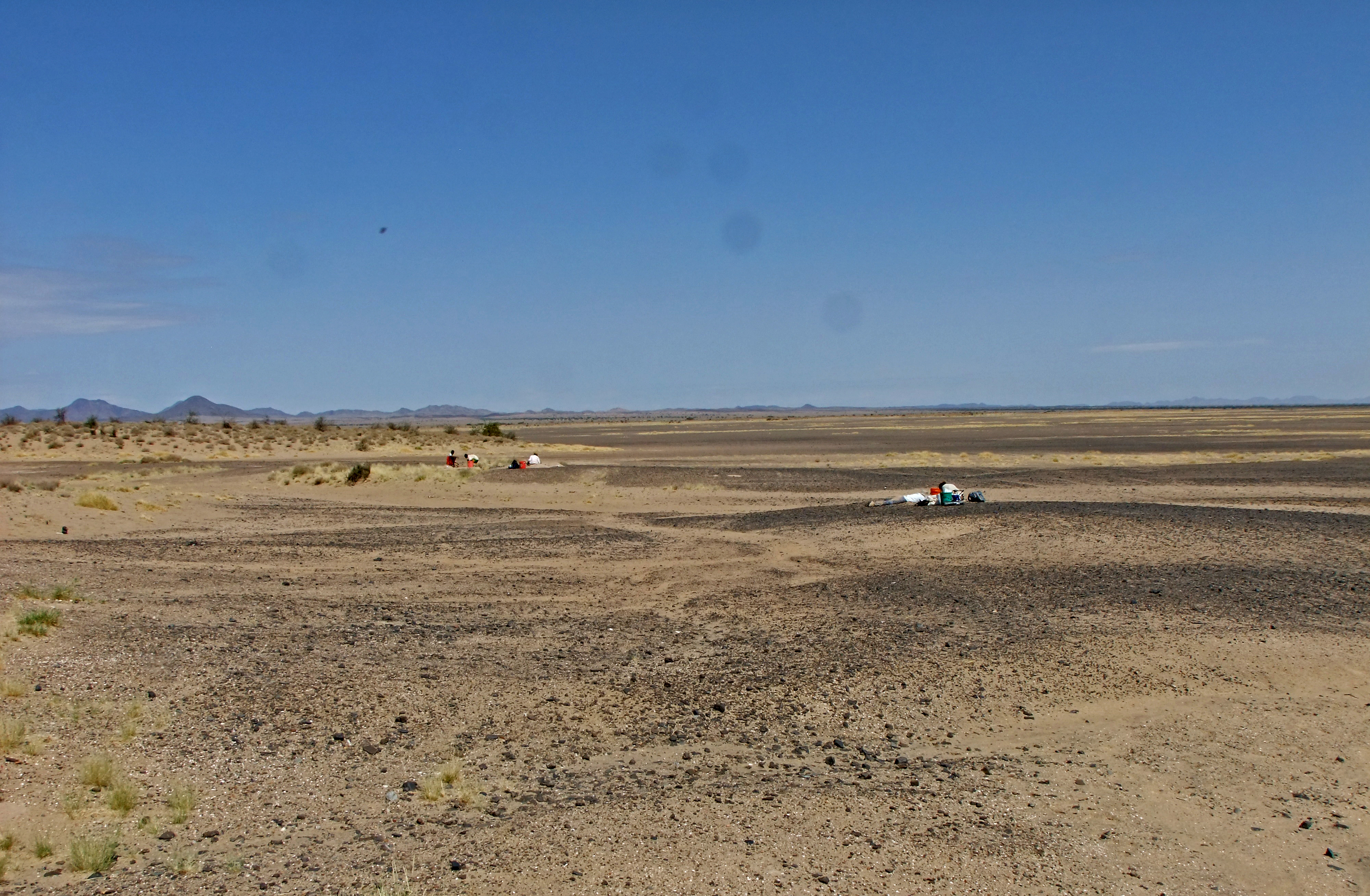
- The site of Nataruk taken during excavations

- Location in Kenya
- Location: Turkana County, Kenya
- Region: Lake Turkana

Site notes
- Excavation dates: from 2012
- Archaeologists: Marta Mirazón Lahr
- Discovered: 2012
- Dated to 9,500–10,500 BP (7,550–8,550 BC)

Nataruk in Turkana County, Kenya, is the site of an archaeological investigation which uncovered the remains of 27 people. It dates between 9,500 and 10,500 BP (7,550–8,550 BC). The remains have garnered wide media attention for possible bioarchaeological evidence of interpersonal violence, i.e. prehistoric warfare.

According to the Nature article published by Dr. Mirazón Lahr and colleagues, the skeletons present the earliest evidence for intergroup violence among hunting-foraging populations, which they interpret as a "massacre": the remains of adults and six children show signs of a violent end, having been clubbed or stabbed and left to die without burial. Two of the male remains had stone projectile tips lodged in the skull and thorax.

However, a 'Brief Communication Arising' published in Nature by Christopher Stojanowski and colleagues calls into question much of the alleged evidence of a "massacre". Their critique centers on two main points. First, these authors suggest that much of the evidence of peri-mortem trauma identified by Mirazón Lahr is equally - if not more - likely to have occurred after deposition; that is, after the skeletons were buried, intentionally or otherwise. Second, Stojanowski disagrees over the interpretation of the site formation processes. Where Mirazón Lahr sees little evidence for intentional burial at the site, Stojanowski argues that the bodies at Nataruk are mostly articulated, spatially organized, non-commingled, and preserve limited variation in body positioning, all of which are inconsistent with skeletons from well-documented massacre sites.

It is unclear exactly what happened at the site, but Mirazón Lahr stands by her interpretation that it was a massacre, the result of an attack by another group of hunter-gatherers. They stated it is "the earliest scientifically-dated historical evidence of human conflict.", although Jebel Sahaba, another prehistoric cemetery site, has been dated between 13,400 and 18,600 BP and predates Nataruk by several millennia. As of 2021 the earliest documented evidence of interpersonal violence between H. sapiens appears to be the partial remains of a skeleton in Wadi Kubbaniya from 19,000-18,000BP.

The excavation at Nataruk, led by Dr. Marta Mirazón Lahr as part of the IN-AFRICA Project, began in 2012.

== Turkana in the late Pleistocene–early Holocene ==
10,000 years ago, Turkana was lush and fertile; Lake Turkana was much larger than it is today. Many sites from this time period have been found along the ancient shore of the lake. Nataruk is one of these sites, a temporary camp where a band of hunter-gatherers went to fish and hunt. The area has produced thousands of animal fossils: elephants, hippos, rhinos, giraffe, zebras, warthogs, buffaloes, antelopes, gazelles, primates, hyraxes, snakes, turtles, crocodiles and fish, as well as lions, hyaenas and wild dogs. The people of southwest Turkana at this time were hunters, gatherers, and fishers. Evidence for hunting and butchering animals has been found, along with hundreds of barbed bone harpoons used for fishing. Pottery has also been found from this time period.

== The discoveries at Nataruk ==
In 2012, fragments of human bones were found on the surface at Nataruk, mixed with gravel, an area that is barren desert today. The survey of the site showed that Nataruk was exceptional not only in the number of exposed remains, but also in their distribution throughout a large area of ~200 x 100 m, forming clusters along a sandy ridge and on two mounts. By the time the excavations were completed, archaeologists had found the remains of 27 people—6 young children, 1 teenager and 20 adults. Twelve of the skeletons—7 men and 5 women—were found as they had died, unburied until they were covered by the shallow water of the lagoon.

Ten of these 12 skeletons show lesions caused by violence—in the head, neck, ribs, hands, and knees, all the parts of the skeleton most commonly involved in cases of violence. These include 2 cases of projectiles in direct association with the remains, one still embedded on the side of the skull, 2 cases of sharp-force trauma to the neck, 7 cases of blunt and/or sharp-force trauma to the head, 2 cases of blunt-force trauma to the knees and 1 to the ribs, and 2 cases of fractures to the hands, possibly caused while parrying a blow.

The lesions were caused by at least 3 types of weapons: projectiles (stone-tipped as well as sharpened arrows), by a weapon similar to a club, and by another close-proximity weapon, possibly a club or wooden handle with hafted sharp stone blades that caused deep cuts. Two individuals were found to have no lesions in the preserved parts of the skeleton, but the position of their hands suggests they may have been bound, including a young woman who was heavily pregnant at the time.

The site of Nataruk and the human remains it preserved were dated three by different methods: radiocarbon, carried out by Rachel Wood at the Australian National University and Beta Analytic Inc., optically stimulated luminescence carried out by Jean-Luc Schwenninger at the University of Oxford, and Uranium-series by Rainer Grün, at Griffiths University, showing them to be between 10,500 and 9,500 years ago.

== The demographic profile of the people found at Nataruk ==
Of the 27 individuals discovered at Nataruk, 4 (KNM-WT 71261, KNM-WT 71262, KNM-WT 71268, KNM-WT 71277) were the remains of adults, too fragmentary to estimate their age and sex accurately. The age and sex of the remaining adults, and age of the children are:

Children	Teenagers	Young women (20–30 yrs)	Young men (20–30 yrs)	Middle Aged Older women (30–45 yrs)	Middle Aged Older men (30–45 yrs)	Older women (45+ yrs)	Older men (45+ yrs)
WT 71272 (< 3 yrs) WT 71269 (3–4 yrs) WT 71271 (4–5 yrs) WT 71273 (5–6 yrs) WT 71270 (< 6 yrs)	WT 71252 (12–15 yrs)	WT 71255 WT 71256 WT 71265	WT 71253 WT 71254	WT 71254 WT 71266 WT 71275	WT 71258 WT 71260 WT 71263 WT 71264 WT 71276	WT 71259	WT 71251

== Nataruk and the prehistory of warfare ==
Warfare, or inter-group conflict, is today associated with one group of people wanting the territory, resources, or power held by another. Prehistoric hunter-gatherer societies were not sedentary and did not own land or have significant possessions, and their small numbers constrained the development of social hierarchies. Therefore, many scholars have argued that warfare only emerged after sedentism, farming, and more complex political systems arose, although this view has been disputed by other scientists. If Mirazón Lahr and colleagues' interpretations are correct, the findings at Nataruk suggest that inter-group conflict has a long history and was part of the life of hunter-gatherers.

Mirazón Lahr argues that this challenges our views of what are the causes of conflict; while it is possible that human prehistoric societies simply responded antagonistically to chance encounters with other groups, she believes that the event preserved at Nataruk was a deliberate attack by one group of hunter-gatherers on another. The evidence from Nataruk shows that the attacking party was carrying weapons that would not normally be carried while hunting and fishing. The lesions show that clubs of at least two sizes were used, indicating that more than one of the attackers were carrying them. The attack combined distance (arrows) and close-proximity (melee) weaponry (clubs, stone knives), suggesting premeditation and planning. Also, there are other examples, though isolated, of violent trauma in the early Holocene archaeological record of Southwest Turkana; one, discovered in the 1970s by archaeologist Larry Robbins, was found ~20 km north of Nataruk at the site of Lothagam; the other two were also discovered by the IN-AFRICA Project at a site close to Nataruk named Kalakoel 4. All three cases involved projectiles, one of the hallmarks of inter-group conflict. Finally, two of the projectiles found embedded in the human skeletons at Nataruk and in 2 of the other 3 cases of violent trauma in Southwest Turkana were made of obsidian, a rare stone in this area, suggesting that the attackers came from a different place. This shows that such attacks happened multiple times in at least three different locations within a relatively small area.

Regarding the motive for the attack, the hunter-gatherers that lived around Nataruk may have had valuable resources that were worth fighting for—water, game and its meat, fish, nuts, or indeed women and children, suggesting that two of the conditions associated with warfare among settled societies—territory and resources—were probably the same for these groups. In particular, that part of the basin would have had an extensive beach along a shallow lake shore that attracted land animals to water and also provided perfect fishing grounds, making it the perfect place to hunt and fish. In contrast, a few kilometres to the east and to the north, the ancient deltas of the Kerio River and Turkwel River would have been forested and more dangerous, while further to the east the mountains that separate Lake Turkana from the Suguta Valley reached into the water. So Nataruk was at the centre of the best hunting and fishing grounds in that part of the Turkana Basin, and the hunter-gatherer communities there had access to much richer resources than others.

Mirazón Lahr argues that evolution is about survival, and that our species is no different from others in this respect. When resources are insufficient, competing is part of surviving, and when groups thrive and expand over the territory of others, it can lead to conflict. In her view, the key to prehistoric conflict was probably population density: very low numbers may have inhibited warfare, while inter-group conflict may have been common in periods of food abundance and increased population density. These conditions were a recurrent part of our evolutionary history, making Nataruk extraordinary not because warfare was rare or because it is 10,000 years old, but because the evidence of inter-group violence has rarely been preserved in the archaeology of nomadic peoples. Unexpectedly, perhaps, those conditions arose when resources were plentiful.

== Nataruk and Jebel Sahaba ==
The Qadan graveyard at Jebel Sahaba (Site 117) is an extraordinary archaeological site. It was excavated by Fred Wendorf in the 1960s, who believed it to be of late Pleistocene-early Holocene age:

"...Near the end of the 1965 excavations several members of the Finnish Expedition joined in the effort to excavate the graveyard. Three burials were cleared by the Finnish group, and one skull was taken to the National Museum of Finland. Forty-nine skeletons were uncovered at this time. Subsequent excavations were undertaken by Marks in October, 1966, and six more skeletons were found. A total of 58 skeletons were recovered from all three projects at the site. Most of these were in excellent condition, and included both males and females, infants and adults. Although radiocarbon dates are not available, on the basis of associated artifacts, plus tenuous geologic evidence, the skeletons are believed to date somewhere between 12,000 and 10,000 B.C. They are particularly significant in that they provide an unusual opportunity to examine a sizable population of Late Pleistocene age."

Antoine Zazzo has since carried out radiocarbon dating of the human remains using apatite, although he stresses the ages obtained should be treated with caution "...because the reliability of the reference age, a bone collagen sample dated in the late 60's or very early 70's, i.e.well before the advent of modern purification techniques, and in a site where collagen preservation is very poor, remains questionable." Nevertheless, the combination of the dates obtained by Antoine, and Wendorf's own assessment of the likely age of the remains, are a strong indication that the age of the human remains in the cemetery must be either a little older or similar to that of Nataruk.

The similarity in age between the two sites makes the comparison of the violent events they preserve fascinating. Jebel Sahaba is a cemetery, in which 58 people were intentionally buried, all in the same position, and in relatively elaborate graves, with some graves either lined by vertical large stone slabs, or covered by horizontal ones. Twenty-three of the 58 people buried at Jebel Sahaba have evidence of having died violently, including embedded projectiles. However, several aspects make Jebel Sahaba very different from Nataruk, suggesting parallels between Jebel Sahaba and later Neolithic sedentary societies:

1. the fact that there was a large cemetery, and one with architecture suggests that those interred at Cemetery 117 lived in a settlement somewhere in the vicinity of the site, thus no longer as nomadic hunter-gatherers;
2. the fact that some of the graves contain more than one skeleton (some with both adults and children) opens the possibility that each grave is an "event", and that the deaths record not a single violent encounter as in Nataruk, but recurrent attacks on Jebel Sahaba throughout a period of time, and that they buried their dead after each attack, in their own cemetery;
3. the fact that the bodies were buried, means that there was time enough after the events in which people died to prepare a grave, of the right size for the number of individuals, in some cases lining them with slabs, to bury them following their traditions, placing the bodies in the same flexed position with the face oriented in the same direction.

The differences between the two sites make what was discovered at Nataruk even more significant by establishing that inter-group violence can and did arise independent of whether populations were sedentary and had possessions that today are identified as valuable. All it needed was for the benefits of stealing from another group to outweigh the costs of fighting for them.
