= Prehistoric warfare =

Type of war

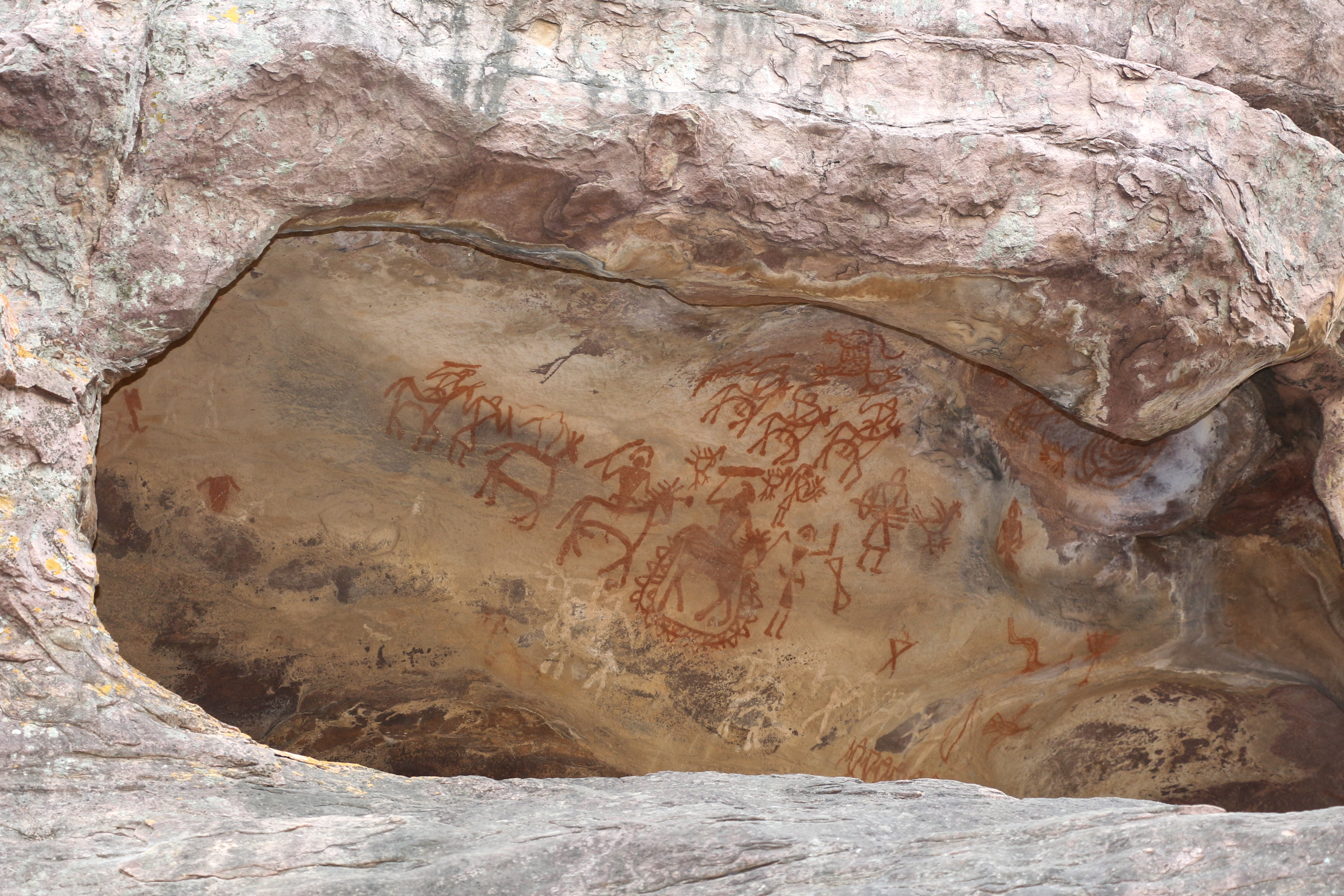
Paintings in Bhimbetka possibly depicting war scene (1000-800 BCE)

Prehistoric warfare refers to war that occurred between societies without recorded history.

The existence—and the definition—of war in humanity's state of nature has been a controversial topic in the history of ideas at least since Thomas Hobbes in Leviathan (1651) argued a "war of all against all", a view directly challenged by Jean-Jacques Rousseau in a Discourse on Inequality (1755) and The Social Contract (1762). The debate over human nature continues, spanning contemporary anthropology, archaeology, ethnography, history, political science, psychology, primatology, and philosophy in such divergent books as Azar Gat's War in Human Civilization and Raymond C. Kelly's Warless Societies and the Origin of War. For the purposes of this article, "prehistoric war" will be broadly defined as a state of organized lethal aggression between autonomous preliterate communities.

== Paleolithic ==
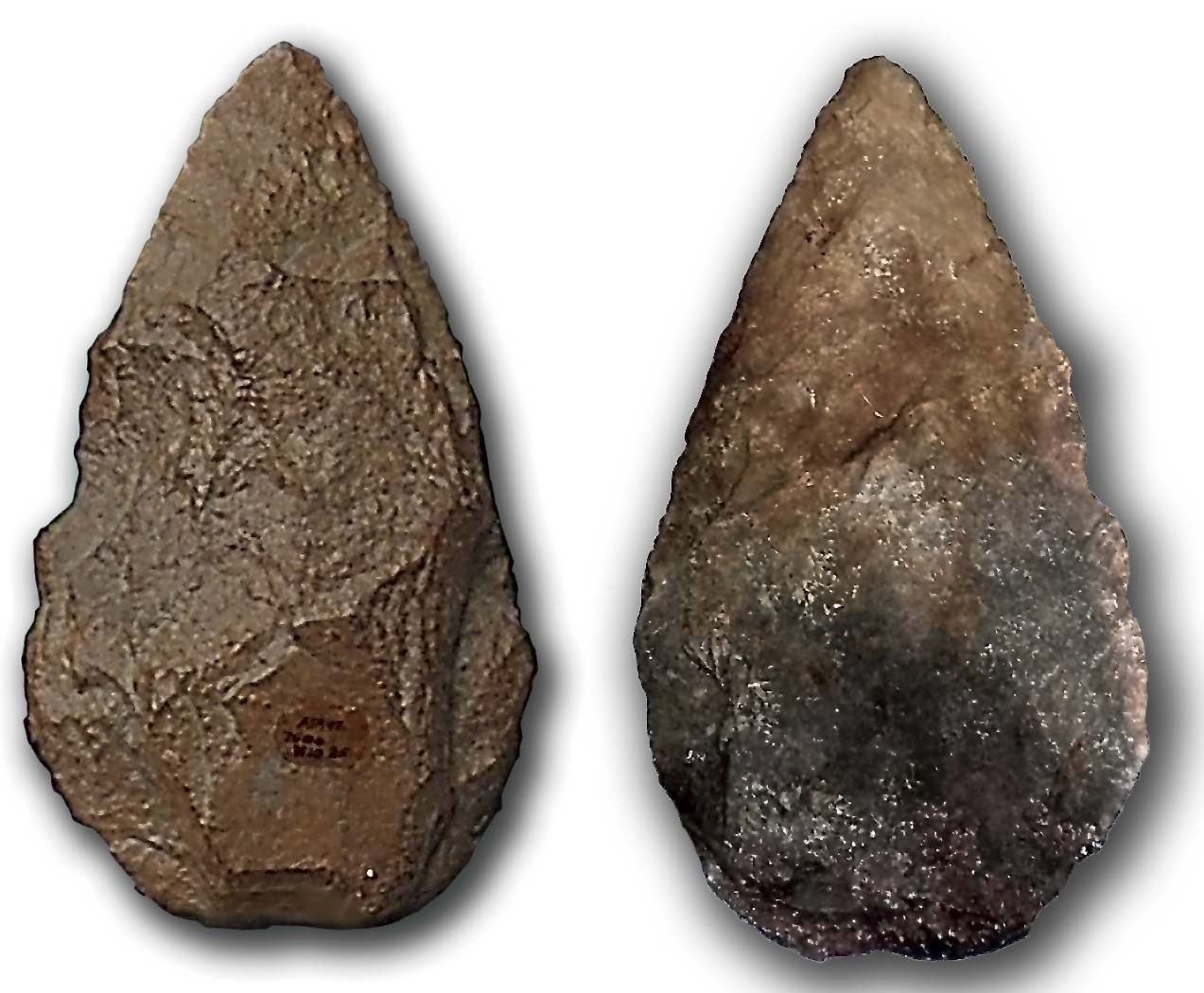
Quartzite hand axe

Some scientists argue that humans have a predisposition for violence. Chimpanzees, one of the great apes genetically closest to humans, are known to wage wars over territories and resources.

According to cultural anthropologist and ethnographer Raymond C. Kelly, population density among the earliest hunter-gatherer societies of Homo erectus was probably low enough to avoid armed conflict. The development of the throwing-spear and ambush hunting techniques required cooperation, which made potential violence between hunting parties very costly. The need to prevent competition for resources by maintenance of low population densities may have accelerated the migration out of Africa of H. erectus some 1.8 million years ago as a natural consequence of conflict avoidance.

Hypotheses which suggest that genocidal violence may have caused the extinction of the Neanderthals have been offered by several authors, including Jared Diamond and Ronald Wright. The hypothesis that early humans violently replaced Neanderthals was first proposed by French paleontologist Marcellin Boule (the first person to publish an analysis of a Neanderthal) in 1912. However, several scholars have formed alternative theories as to why the Neanderthals died out, and there is no clear consensus as to what caused their extinction within the current scientific community.

Raymond C. Kelly believes that this period of "Paleolithic warlessness" persisted until well after the appearance of Homo sapiens some 315,000 years ago, ending only at the occurrence of economic and social shifts associated with sedentism, when new conditions incentivized organized raiding of settlements.

None of the many cave paintings of the Upper Paleolithic depicts people attacking other people explicitly, but there are depictions of human beings pierced with arrows both of the Aurignacian-Périgordian (roughly 30,000 years old) and the early Magdalenian (c. 17,000 years old), possibly representing "spontaneous confrontations over game resources" in which hostile trespassers were killed; however, other interpretations, including capital punishment, human sacrifice, assassination or systemic warfare cannot be ruled out.

It has also been suggested that lack of evidence of Paleolithic warfare is due to differences in archaeology resulting in less evidence being likely to survive to be analysed compared to other eras. Since Paleolithic humans lived in small, mobile bands, with low population densities and less durable structures, while also existing further back in history, this results in a lower probability of finding clear evidence as well as that evidence not decaying by the modern day. Furthermore, humans only began to bury their dead 150,000 years ago and not all cultures did so (some preferring to remove them by cremation or exposure), limiting remains that can be found. The absence of fortifications could also be due to the fact that fortifications would be inefficient to construct for a society that is primarily nomadic and that only spends a short period of time in one place. Kissel et al. argue that while the general scarcity of evidence from the period suggests warfare may not have been common, it does not support the hypothesis that war was absent.

== Epipaleolithic & Mesolithic ==
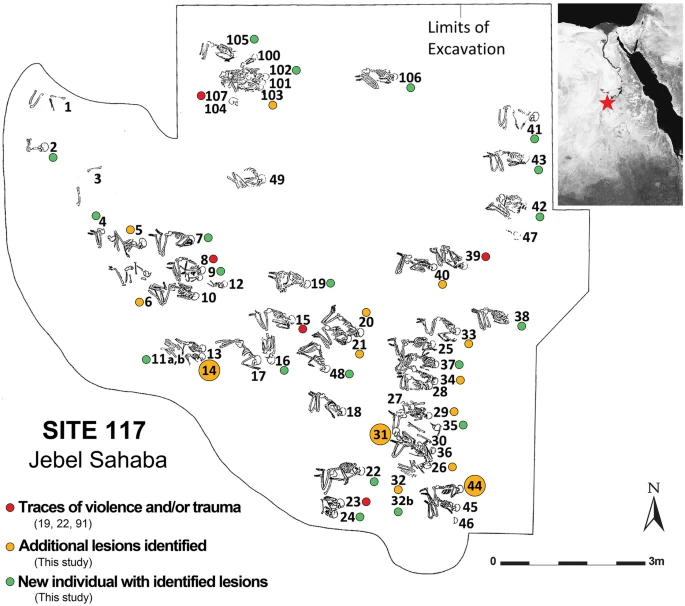
Location of the Jebel Sahaba cemetery

The most ancient archaeological record of what could have been a prehistoric massacre is at the site of Jebel Sahaba, committed against a population associated with the Qadan culture of far northern Sudan. The cemetery contains a large number of skeletons that are approximately 13,000 to 14,000 years old, with 24 out of 59 skeletons presenting projectile points embedded in their skeletons, which indicates that they might have been the casualties of warfare. Significantly, such violence would have occurred during an ecological crisis in which the Nile River, driven by climate change, "cut a gorge eliminating the previous broad spectrum subsistence base," after which "the area was entirely abandoned by humans." Initially, Jebel Seheba was believed to be the site of a singular battle. However re-examination of the remains has superseded this thesis. The co-occurrence of healed and unhealed lesions among 41 individuals was found to strongly support sporadic and recurrent violence between the social groups of the Nile valley.

At the site of Nataruk in Turkana, Kenya, numerous 10,000-year-old human remains were found with possible evidence of major traumatic injuries, including obsidian bladelets embedded in the skeletons, that should have been lethal. According to the original study, published in January 2016, the region was a "fertile lakeshore landscape sustaining a substantial population of hunter-gatherers" where pottery had been found, suggesting storage of food and sedentism. The initial report concluded that the bodies at Nataruk were not interred, but were preserved in the positions the individuals had died at the edge of a lagoon. However, evidence of blunt-force cranial trauma and lack of interment have been called into question, casting doubt upon the assertion that the site represents early intragroup violence.

The oldest rock art depicting acts of violence between hunter-gatherers in Northern Australia has been tentatively dated to 10,000 years ago.

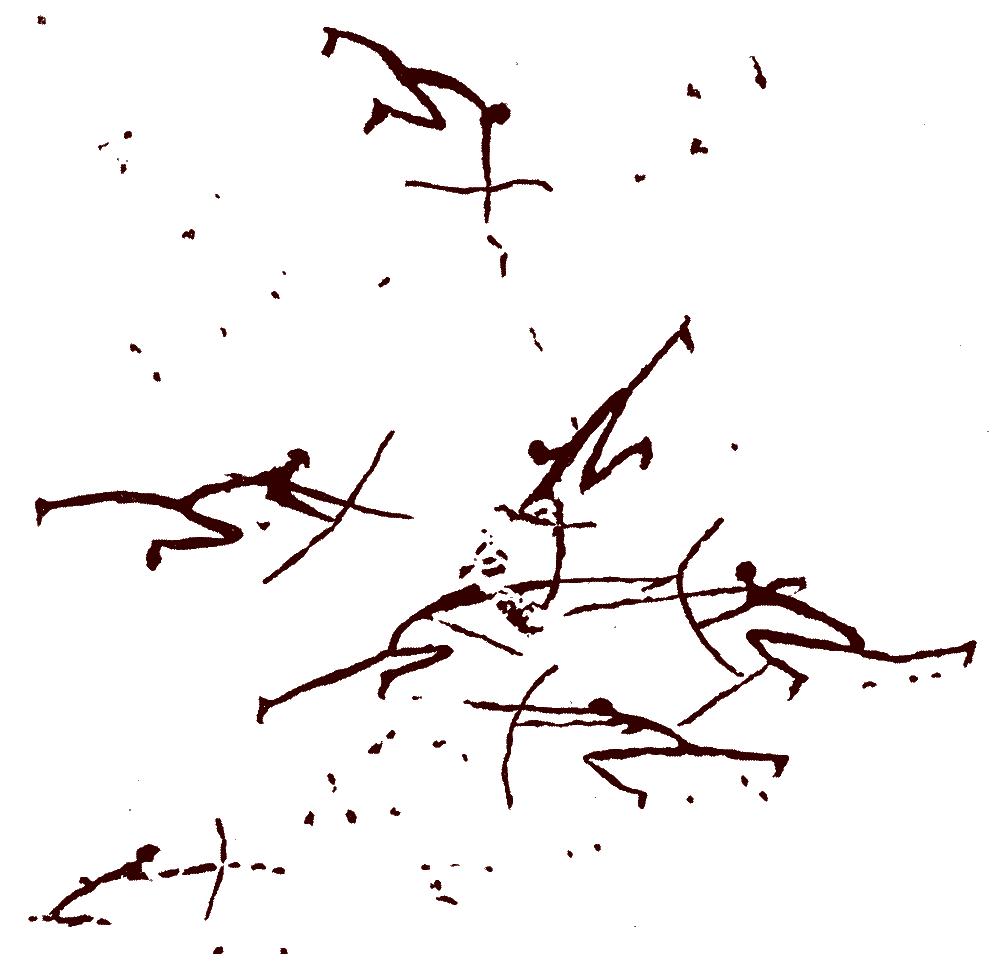
Cave painting of a battle between archers, Morella la Vella, Spain.

The earliest, limited evidence for war in Mesolithic Europe likewise dates to c. 10,000 years ago, and episodes of warfare appear to remain "localized and temporarily restricted" during the Late Mesolithic to Early Neolithic period in Europe. Iberian cave art of the Mesolithic shows explicit scenes of battle between groups of archers. A group of three archers encircled by a group of four is found in Cova del Roure, Morella la Vella, Castellón, Valencia. A depiction of a larger battle (which may, however, date to the early Neolithic), in which eleven archers are attacked by seventeen running archers, is found in Les Dogue, Ares del Maestrat, Castellón, Valencia. At Val del Charco del Agua Amarga, Alcañiz, Aragon, seven archers with plumes on their heads are fleeing a group of eight archers running in pursuit.

Early war was influenced by the development of bows, maces, and slings. The bow seems to have been the most important weapon in early warfare, in that it enabled attacks to be launched with far less risk to the attacker when compared to the risk involved in melee combat. While there are no cave paintings of battles between men armed with clubs, the development of the bow is concurrent with the first known depictions of organized warfare consisting of clear illustrations of two or more groups of men attacking each other. These figures are arrayed in lines and columns with a distinctly garbed leader at the front. Some paintings even portray still-recognizable tactics like flankings and envelopments. However, it has also been argued that these paintings should be interpreted with caution due to the fact that it is not self-evident that the cultures that made them intended to depict actual events or if they were intended to be symbolic or otherwise possess a different meaning.

== Neolithic ==
Systemic warfare appears to have been a direct consequence of the sedentism as it developed in the wake of the Neolithic Revolution. An important example is the massacre of Talheim Death Pit (near Heilbronn, Germany), dated right on the cusp of the beginning European Neolithic, at 5500 BC. Investigation of the Neolithic skeletons found in the Talheim Death pit in Germany suggests that prehistoric men from neighboring tribes were prepared to brutally fight and kill each other in order to capture and secure women. Researchers discovered that there were women among the immigrant skeletons, but within the local group of skeletons there were only men and children. They concluded that the absence of women among the local skeletons meant that they were regarded as somehow special, thus they were spared execution and captured instead. The capture of women may have indeed been the primary motive for the fierce conflict between the men.

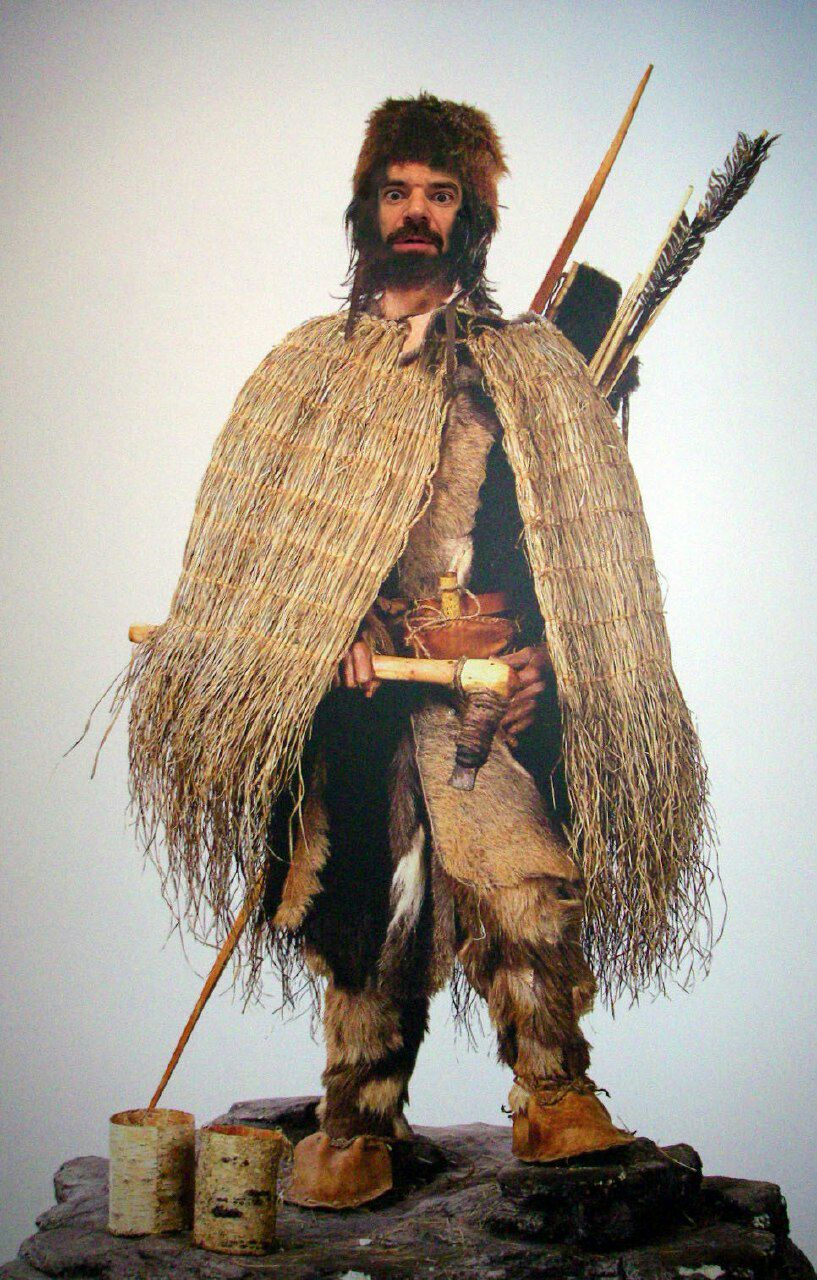
Reconstruction of Otzi, a Neolithic man from Europe carrying a bow, a quiver of arrows and a copper axe. South Tyrol Museum of Archaeology, Italy

Other speculations about the reasons for violence among Linear Pottery Culture settlements in Neolithic Europe include vengeance, conflicts over land and resources, and kidnapping of slaves. Some of these theories related to the lack of resources are supported by the discovery that various fortifications bordering indigenously inhabited areas appear to have not been in use for very long. A mass burial site at Schletz was also fortified, which serves as evidence of violent conflict among tribes and means that these fortifications were built as a form of defense against aggressors. The massacre of Schletz occurred at the same time as the massacre at Talheim and several other massacres. More than 200 Neolithic people were killed during the massacre in the Linear Pottery settlement area of Schletz 7,000 years ago.

More recently, a similar site was discovered at Schöneck-Kilianstädten, with the remains of the victims showing "a pattern of intentional mutilation". While the presence of such massacre sites in the context of Early Neolithic Europe is undisputed, diverging definitions of "warfare proper" (i.e. planned campaigns sanctioned by society as opposed to spontaneous massacres) has led to scholarly debate on the existence of warfare in the narrow sense prior to the development of city states in 20th-century archaeology. In the summary of Heath (2017), accumulating archaeology has made it "increasingly harder" to argue for the absence of organised warfare in Neolithic Europe.

Bioarchaeologists have found from the skeletal remains of more than 2,300 early farmers from 180 sites in northwestern Europe between 8,000 and 4,000 years ago that more than one in ten suffered weapon injuries.

During the period of expansion of hunter-gatherer groups associated with the Pitted Ware culture in southern Scandinavia, the Funnelbeaker farmers constructed a number of defensive palisades, which may mean that the two peoples were in conflict with each other. There is archaeological evidence of high levels of violence among the people of the Pitted Ware culture.

Ötzi, who lived and died in the European Alps some 5,200 years ago, was probably killed in warfare.

Warfare in pre-Columbian North America has served as an important comparandum in the archaeological study of the indirect evidence for warfare in the Neolithic. A notable example is the massacre at the Crow Creek Site in South Dakota (14th century).

== Chalcolithic to Bronze Age ==
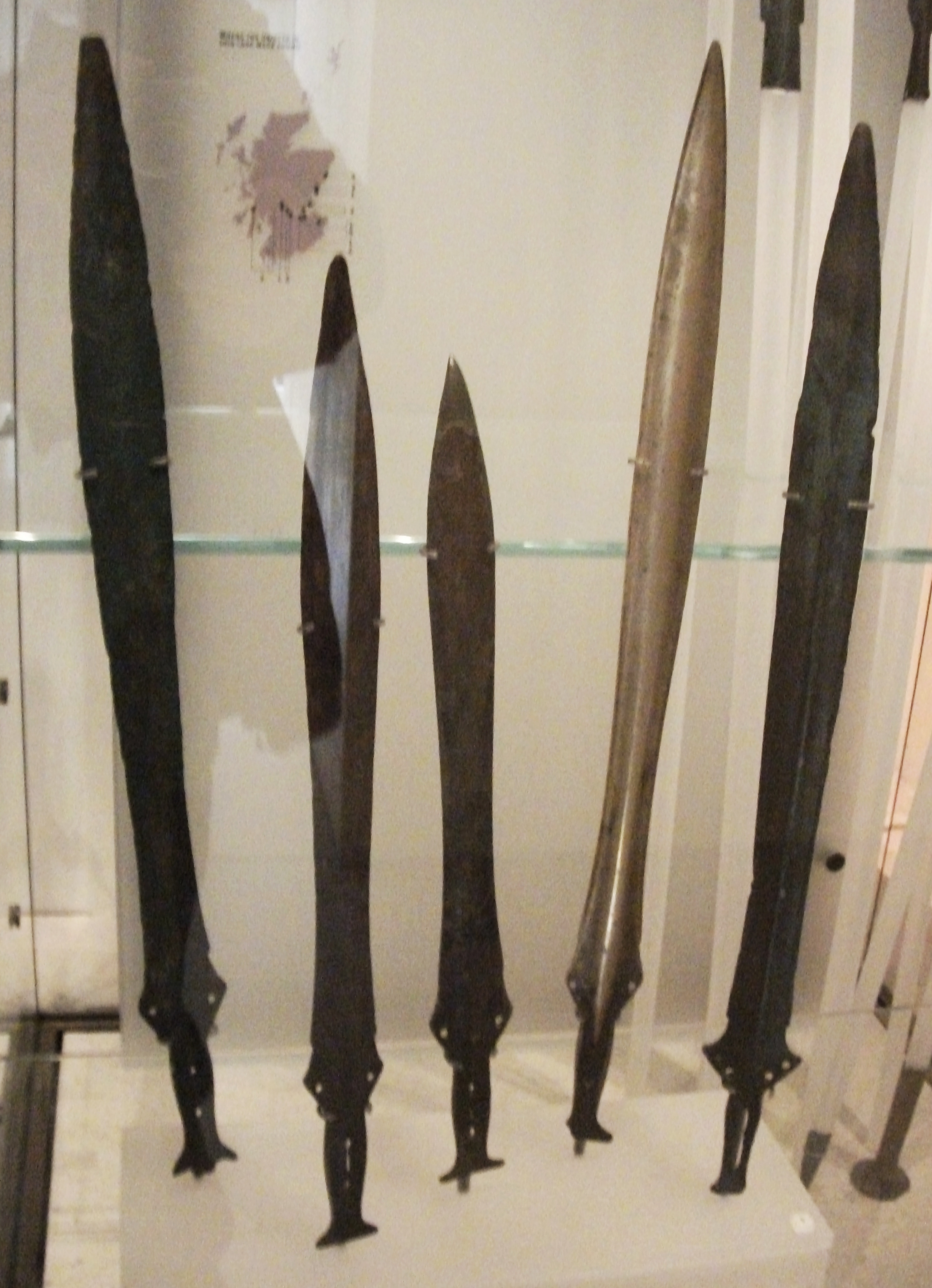
Bronze swords from the Museum of Scotland.

The onset of the Chalcolithic (Copper Age) saw the introduction of copper weapons. Organised warfare between early city states was in existence by the mid-5th millennium BC. Excavations at Mersin, Anatolia show the presence of fortifications and soldiers' quarters by 4300 BC.

Excavation work undertaken in 2005 and 2006 has shown that Hamoukar was destroyed by warfare by around 3500 BC-—probably the earliest urban warfare attested so far in the archaeological record of the Near East. Continued excavations in 2008 and 2010 expand on that.

Archaeological evidence suggests that Proto-Indo-Iranian-speaking Abashevo society was intensely warlike. Mass graves reveal that inter-tribal battles involved hundreds of warriors of both sides. Warfare appears to have been more frequent in the late Abashevo period, and it was in this turbulent environment that the Sintashta culture emerged. The spread of spoke-wheeled chariots has been closely associated with early Indo-Iranian migrations. The earliest known chariots have been found in Sintashta culture burial sites, and the culture is considered a strong candidate for the origin of the technology, which spread throughout the Old World and played an important role in ancient warfare.

Military conquests expanded city states under Egyptian control. Babylonia and later Assyria built empires in Mesopotamia while the Hittite Empire ruled much of Anatolia. Chariots appear in the 20th century BC, and become central to warfare in the Ancient Near East from the 17th century BC. The Hyksos and Kassite invasions mark the transition to the Late Bronze Age. Ahmose I defeated the Hyksos and re-established Egyptian control of Nubia and Canaan, territories again defended by Ramesses II at the Battle of Kadesh, the greatest chariot battle in history. The raids of the Sea Peoples and the renewed disintegration of Egypt in the Third Intermediate Period marks the end of the Bronze Age.

The Tollense valley battlefield is the oldest evidence of a large scale battle in Europe. More than 4,000 warriors from Central Europe fought in a battle on the site in the 13th century BC.

Mycenaean Greeks (c. 1600 – c. 1100 BC) invested in the development of military infrastructure, while military production and logistics were supervised directly from the palatial centers. The most identifiable piece of Mycenaean armor was the boar's tusk helmet. In general, most features of the later hoplite panoply of classical Greek antiquity, were already known to Mycenaean Greece.

Invasions, destruction and possible population movements during the Late Bronze Age collapse, beginning c. 1200 BC

The Late Bronze Age collapse was a time of widespread societal collapse during the 12th century BC, between c. 1200 and 1150. It was sudden, violent, and culturally disruptive for many Bronze Age civilizations, and it brought a sharp economic decline to regional powers, notably ushering in the Greek Dark Ages. Historian Robert Drews argues for the appearance of massed infantry, using newly developed weapons and armour, such as cast rather than forged spearheads and long swords, a revolutionizing cut-and-thrust weapon, and javelins. Such new weaponry, in the hands of large numbers of "running skirmishers", who could swarm and cut down a chariot army, would destabilize states that were based upon the use of chariots by the ruling class. That would precipitate an abrupt social collapse as raiders began to conquer, loot and burn cities.

The Bronze Age in China traverses the protohistoric and historic periods. Evidence from graves at Mogou in Lintan County, Gansu (dated approximately 2300 – 1500 BC) indicates that the Qijia culture experienced high levels of interpersonal violence. During China's Bronze Age, especially under the Shang and Zhou dynasties (c. 1200 – 256 BC), chariots were crucial war machines, used by elites for shock attacks and for archers on open plains, forming a core part of warfare until superseded by cavalry and infantry in the Warring States period.

The Yayoi period (c. 300 BC – 300 AD) in Japan saw a significant rise in violence and warfare, characterized by fortified villages, metal weapons (bronze, then iron), and skeletal trauma from conflict like arrow wounds, linked to agriculture and population pressure. Evidence includes mass graves, fortified settlements (like Yoshinogari), and weaponry, suggesting organized conflict and increasing social complexity leading to the rise of powerful regional chieftains and proto-states, culminating in recorded strife like the Civil War of Wa.

== Iron Age ==
Early Iron Age events like the Greek colonisation and their interaction with Phoenician and Etruscan forces lie within the prehistoric period. Germanic warrior societies of the Migration period engaged in endemic warfare (see also Thorsberg moor and Illerup Ådal). Anglo-Saxon warfare lies on the edge of historicity, its study relying primarily on archaeology with the help of only fragmentary written accounts.

There are around 3,300 structures that can be classed as hillforts or similar "defended enclosures" within Britain. Hillforts in Britain are known from the Bronze Age, but the great period of hillfort construction was during the British Iron Age, between 700 BC and the Roman conquest of Britain in 43 AD. The reason for the emergence of hillforts in Britain, and their purpose, has been a subject of debate. It has been argued that they could have been military sites constructed in response to invasion from continental Europe, sites built by invaders, or a military reaction to social tensions caused by an increasing population and consequent pressure on agriculture.

== Endemic warfare ==
The percentages of men who were killed in wars in eight tribal societies. (Lawrence H. Keeley, War Before Civilization)

In warlike cultures, war is often ritualized with a number of taboos and practices that limit the number of casualties and the duration of the conflict. This type of situation is known as endemic warfare. Among tribal societies engaging in endemic warfare, conflict may escalate to actual warfare occasionally for reasons such as conflict over resources or for no readily understandable reason.

Warfare is known to every tribal society, but some societies developed a particular emphasis on the formation of a warrior culture (such as the Nuer of South Sudan, the Māori of New Zealand, the Dugum Dani of Papua, the Yanomami (dubbed "the Fierce People") of the Amazon.) The culture of inter-tribal warfare has long been present in New Guinea.

== See also ==
- Outline of prehistoric technology
- War Before Civilization

== Bibliography ==
- Fry, Douglas P. (2013). War, Peace, and Human Nature. Oxford University Press.
- Karsten, Rafael (1923). Blood revenge, war, and victory feasts among the Jibaro Indians of eastern Ecuador.
- Kelly, Raymond C. (2000). Warless societies and the origin of war. Ann Arbor: University of Michigan Press.
- LeBlanc, Steven A. (1999). Prehistoric Warfare in the American Southwest. University of Utah Press. ISBN 978-0874805819.
- Lee, Wayne E. (2015). Waging War: Conflict, Culture, and Innovation in World History. Oxford University Press.
- Randsborg, Klavs (1995). Hjortspring: Warfare and Sacrifice in Early Europe. Aarhus, Denmark; Oakville, Connecticut: Aarhus University Press.
- Roksandic, Mirjana, ed. (2004). Violent interactions in the Mesolithic: evidence and meaning. Oxford, England: Archaeopress.
