= Jebel Sahaba =

Prehistoric cemetery site in the Nile Valley

War at Jebel Sahaba
- Part of resource competition in the Nile valley
- Jebel Sahaba (Sudan)
Date	c. 12th millennium BC (see Dating)
Location	Jebel Sahaba (جَبَل ٱلصَّحَابَة) (in modern-day Wadi Halfa District, Sudan) 21°59′N 31°20′E

Belligerents
- Qadan people (probably)

Casualties and losses
- 64 killed
- Site notes
- Discovered: 1964
- Archaeologists: Fred Wendorf
- Condition: 61 skeletons in possession of the British Museum since 2002; 3 skeletons missing

Jebel Sahaba (Arabic: جَبَل ٱلصَّحَابَة, romanized: Jabal Aṣ-Ṣaḥābah, lit. 'Mountain of the Companions'; also Site 117) is a prehistoric cemetery site in the Nile Valley (now submerged in Lake Nasser), near the northern border of Sudan with Egypt in Northeast Africa. It is associated with the Qadan culture. It was discovered in 1964 by a team led by Fred Wendorf.

Since their discovery, the skeletons of Jebel Sahaba have been continuously re-evaluated by anthropologists seeking to determine the circumstances of their death. As of the most recent study (2021), it seems most likely that the war (dating to c. 12th millennium BC) was driven by resource scarcity due to climate change. Tribes of the Qadan culture partook in a series of raids and ambushes against one another with projectile weapons – mostly light arrows, but also much heavier arrows or throwing spears.

The site is often cited as the oldest known evidence of warfare or systemic intergroup violence, although as of 2021 the earliest documented evidence of interpersonal violence appears to be the partial remains of a skeleton in Wadi Kubbaniya from 20 ka (i.e. 19th–18th millennium BC).

== Conflict(s) ==
Initially, Jebel Seheba was believed to be the site of a singular battle. However re-examination of the remains has superseded this thesis as of 2021. The co-occurrence of healed and unhealed lesions among 41 individuals (67.2%) was found to strongly support sporadic and recurrent violence between the social groups of the Nile valley. The projectile direction inferred from lesions suggest a series of raids or ambushes, rather than pitched battles.

It is unclear whether the site is the result of a single conflict, a specific burial place or the evidence of sustained inter-personal violence.

=== Cause ===
Hoffman (1993) argued that the conflict took place due to climate change. By the late Paleolithic, the Qadan culture had developed crop harvesting, being among the first cultures to do so. However, climate change reduced crop yields, and the resulting lack of resources would have given an incentive for local social groups to compete for resources through violent struggles such as at Jebel Sahaba.

Hoffman's thesis has not been contested. Decades later, a 2021 study stated that "major climatic and environmental changes" remained the most probable explanation.

=== Dating ===
Initially in 1988, the violence was dated to 14,979–18,568 BP (i.e. 13,029–16,618 BC). This dating was based on bone collagen from a specific skeleton named JS 43. In the late 2010s, numerous authors rejected this date due to poor collagen preservation. A 2021 article assessed that the violence may date anywhere between 13,400 and 18,600 BP (i.e. 11,450 and 16,650 BC), though 13,362–13,727 BP (i.e. 11,412–11,777 BC) appeared to be the best estimate based on dentine dating.

=== Belligerents ===
The individuals at Jebel Seheba have been associated with the Qadan culture, due to the presence of Qadan artefacts nearby the skeletal remains. However, a 2021 study treats a possible connection with caution, due to the position of the artefacts, and as other cultural entities were present in Lower Nubia.

The projectile nature of at least half of the lesions suggests inter-group attacks, rather than intra-group or domestic conflicts.

=== Demographics ===
Of the skeletons whose sex could be identified, 48.7% were female and 51.3% were male, showing no sex bias. Although people of all expected age groups were present, teenagers, children and infants were under-represented.

=== Weaponry ===
Combat at Jebel Sahaba seems to have been fought exclusively with projectile weapons - mostly light arrows, but also much heavier arrows or throwing spears. The use of points with oblique or transverse distal cutting edges appears to indicate that one of the main lethal properties sought was to slash and cause blood loss. The fact that many were found inside the volume of the skeleton also indicates their efficiency at penetrating the body. The lesions reveal an equal number of posterior and anterior strikes that do not support face-to-face melee battles.

== Discovery ==
It was discovered in 1964 by a team led by Fred Wendorf. The original project that discovered the cemetery was the UNESCO High Dam Salvage Project. This salvage dig project was a direct response to the raising of the Aswan Dam which stood to destroy or damage many sites along its path.

Three cemeteries are present in this area. Of these cemeteries, two comprise Jebel Sahaba, with one cemetery located on either side of the Nile. A third cemetery, Tuskha, is situated nearby.

=== Skeletal remains ===
64 individual skeletons were initially discovered at Jebel Sahaba, as well as numerous other fragmented remains, though 3 skeletons were missing by 2002. Of the ones that were later examined, 38 of the skeletons show signs of trauma, with 16 showing indications of injury at or near time of death. Pointed stone projectiles were found in the bodies of 21 individuals, suggesting that these people had been attacked by spears or arrows. Cut marks were found on the bones of other individuals as well. Some damaged bones had healed, demonstrating a persistent pattern of conflict in this society.

Cranial analysis of the Jebel Sahaba fossils found that they shared osteological affinities with a hominid series from Wadi Halfa in Sudan. Additionally, comparison of the limb proportions of the Jebel Sahaba skeletal remains with those of various ancient and recent series indicated that they were most similar in body shape to the examined modern populations from Sub-Saharan Africa (viz. 19th century fossils belonging to the San population, 19th century West Africa fossils, 19th and 20th century Pygmy fossils, and mid-20th century fossils culled from Kenya and Uganda in East Africa). However, the Jebel Sahaba specimens were post-cranially distinct from the Iberomaurusians and other coeval series from North Africa, and they were also morphologically remote from later Nubian skeletal series and from fossils belonging to the Mesolithic Natufian culture of the Levant. Overall, Jebel Sahaba had a morphology associated with heat adaptation, shared with other Africans. In contrast, the Paleolithic Iberomaurusian and Natufian remains were showing traits for cold adaptation, and plotting with Europe and Circumpolar regions.

=== Curation ===
The skeletal remains and any other artifacts recovered by the UNESCO High Dam Salvage Project were donated by Wendorf to the British Museum in 2001; the collection arrived at the museum in March 2002. This collection includes skeletal and fauna remains, lithics, pottery, and environmental samples as well as the full archive of Wendorf's notes, slides, and other material during the dig.

== Selected individual skeletons ==
Three cases (those of JS 13 and 14 together, 31, and 44) best illustrate the complexity and range of lesions found in the Jebel Sahaba individuals regardless of their age-at-death, sex or burial.

=== Young children (JS 13 and JS 14) ===
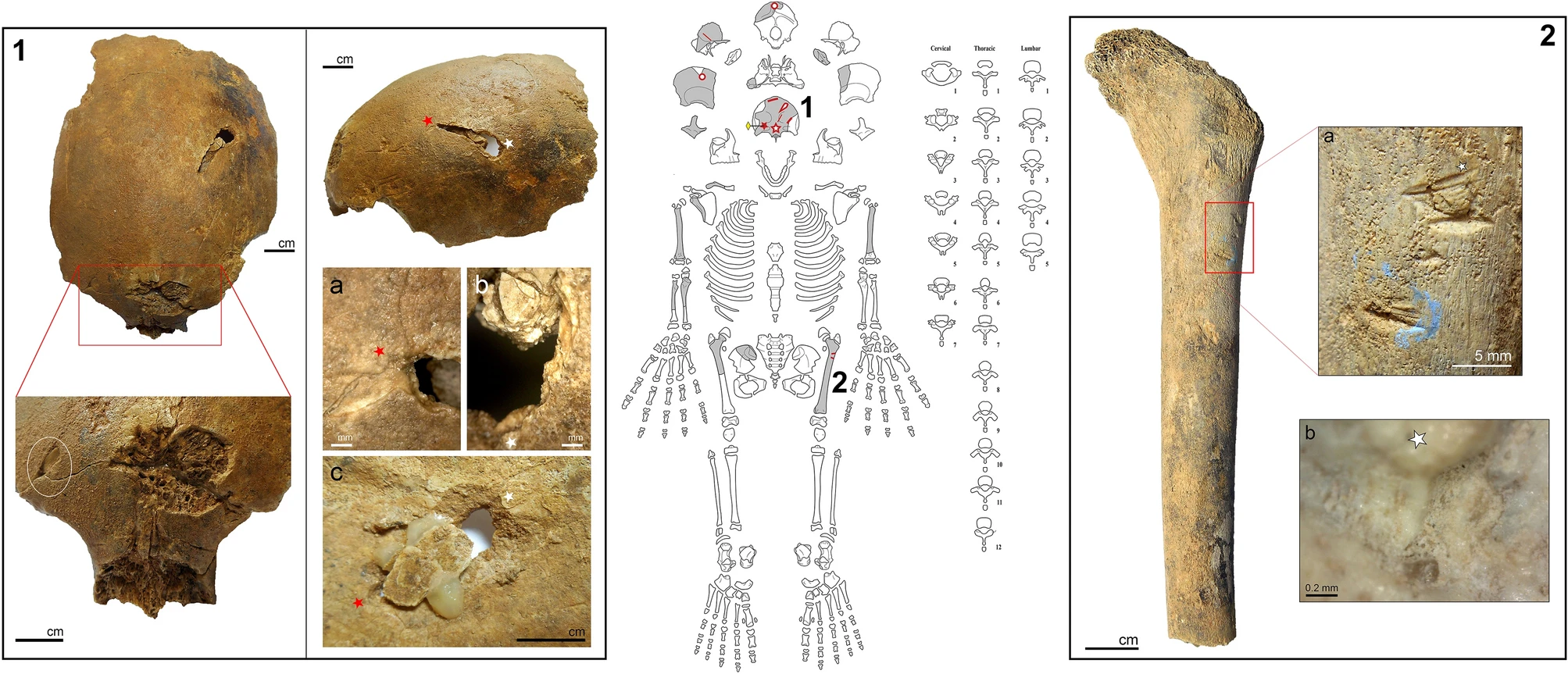
Location and images of the observed osseous lesions on JS 14. See file description for full legend.

The first case concerns the double burial of two children JS 13 and JS 14, who are close to 5 and 4 years of age, respectively, based on dental development and bone growth. Five lithic artefacts were found in association with the two individuals. Although no osseous lesion was visible on JS 13, both the cranium and infra-cranium of JS 14 have unhealed trauma caused by projectile impacts. The majority of the lesions are located on the calvaria and none had previously been documented. The frontal bone exhibits a blunt force trauma at the level of the glabella. Several drag marks and an oblong perforation are also present on the left side of the frontal squama, as well as scraping drag marks close to bregma. Both a puncture site with faulting and part of an embedded artifact are visible approximately one centimeter above the left orbit. A perforation is also present on the right parietal and on the occipital. The frontal and occipital perforation exhibit internal bevelling consistent with projectile impacts. A further set of marks is visible on the left femur, including two groups of drags on the antero-lateral border of the proximal part of the diaphysis. The first group has two subparallel incisions with wide flat floors marked with parallel microstriations. Bone flaking is also present at the end of the trajectory. The second drag is located about one centimeter below the proximal one, and oriented slightly more anteriorly, with a bisecting pattern at the end of the marks. Based on these cutmark characteristics, the projectile most probably arrived from the medial side of the femoral diaphysis, in a downwards motion and towards the lateral side.

=== Injured adult male (JS 31) ===
The second case, JS 31, focuses on the remains of a probable male over 30 years old based on his heavy dental wear and bone remodeling. Seventeen lithic artefacts found in situ were in direct association with his skeletal remains, with two embedded in the bone and fifteen within the physical space of the body. The embedded chips were originally found in the seventh cervical vertebra and in the left pubis, with the bone around both lithics showing severe reactive changes. Unfortunately, these bones are not part of the collection donated to the British Museum. The lesions observed on JS 31 are located on the infra-cranial skeleton. Our reassessment revealed previously unidentified healed and unhealed projectile impact marks (PIMs), as well as healed lesions that are most probably the result of earlier interpersonal injuries. The new unhealed PIMs identified include a puncture with crushing, faulting and flaking of the bone surface on the anterior part of the left scapula and a deep V-shaped drag (2 cm long) on the posterior-medial side of the humerus. JS 31 also has a healed fracture of the distal extremity of the right first metacarpal. Finally, the right femur offers further evidence of healed lesions, with the presence of a bone callus on the lateral side of the proximal part of the shaft and of a healed projectile wound on the anterior side at midshaft. Three previously unidentified embedded lithic chips were found trapped in the healing bulge of the latter.

=== Injured adult female (JS 44) ===
The third case, JS 44, are the remains of a possible female that appears to have been older than 30 years. Twenty-one lithic artefacts were found in close association with the skeleton, one of which was embedded in the fourth rib. Wendorf also noted two examples of chip and/or flake alignments during the excavation which he interpreted as evidence of composite projectile use. The fourth rib with embedded "backed flake" is, unfortunately, also not present in the British Museum Wendorf collection. As with JS 31, all the lesions observed on JS 44 are located in the infra-cranial skeleton, with healed fractures present on the left clavicle, right ulna and radius, and one left rib. The fracture of the left clavicle shaft, located on the acromial end of the diaphysis, reveals a slight torsion and a displacement of the bone fragments. The right forearm healed fracture is oblique, with a displacement (translation and rotation) of the two broken pieces. The clavicle and forearm fractures most probably occurred during the same event. Given the oblique nature in the forearm and acromial involvement in the clavicle, they may have been caused by an indirect trauma, such as a bad fall, rather than a defensive parry fracture. The other lesions, however, are clearly the result of projectile impacts. A triangular notch on the lateral face of the ilium, about 1 cm from the greater sciatic notch, has a lithic fragment embedded in the incision. The laminated aspect of the bone overlying the flake suggests there was an attempt to extract the projectile. The morphology of the PIM also indicates the projectile travelled from the postero-medial to the antero-lateral side of the left pelvic bone, which implies the projectile was travelling back to front. PIMs were also observed on the right femur. Two parallel drags less than 1 cm long and approximately 2 cm from each other are visible on the posterior side of the diaphysis. These drags exhibit a flat bottom with parallel microstriations. The most distal one shows flaking marks on the proximal border. Significantly, the angle of penetration into the bone differs for both drags, with the most proximal one being more tangential. These drag marks reflect a projectile trajectory that came from the disto-lateral to the proximo-medial part of the bone. This upward direction suggests the individual was hit while running or that the projectile was drawn from a lower position. Finally, the spacing between these two drags and their morphology are consistent with the penetration from a single composite projectile. This hypothesis is strengthened by Wendorf's field observation of in situ lithic alignments associated with JS 44.

=== Missing skeletons (JS 1, JS 3 and JS 30) ===
In 2001, Wendorf donated all the archives, artefacts and skeletal remains from his 1965–1966 Nile Valley excavations to the British Museum. Judd's preliminary osteological analysis noted discrepancies between field notes, photographs and associated skeletal remains, including the absence of three individuals, JS 1, JS 3 and JS 30. Not part of the British Museum donation, their whereabouts remains uncertain.

== See also ==
- Prehistoric warfare
- Nataruk
