= Raymond C. Kelly =

American cultural anthropologist and ethnologist

Raymond Case Kelly (born February 16, 1942) is an American cultural anthropologist and ethnologist who has written on the origin of warfare, and on the basis of social inequality in human societies.

== Biography ==
Raymond C. Kelly was born February 16, 1942, in Bridgeport, Connecticut. He is the son of Helen Varkala Kelly and Rowland Leigh Kelly. Both attended the University of Chicago. He has two daughters by previous marriages.

He received his bachelor's degree from the University of Chicago in 1965 and his Ph.D. in anthropology from the University of Michigan in 1974. He taught at the University of Michigan for 33 years and retired in 2002.

His Ph.D. research was in Papua New Guinea, where he spent 16 months doing ethnographic research with the Etoro tribe. This research was the basis for many of his publications. He is the author of four books. He was elected to the National Academy of Sciences in 2005.

== Selected publications ==
- Kelly, R. C. (2005). "Inaugural Article: The evolution of lethal intergroup violence". Proceedings of the National Academy of Sciences. 102 (43): 15294–8. doi:10.1073/pnas.0505955102. PMC 1266108. PMID 16129826.
- (2000) Warless Societies and the Origin of War. Ann Arbor: University of Michigan Press.
- (1993) Constructing Inequality: The Fabrication of a Hierarchiy of Virtue Among the Etoro. Ann Arbor: University of Michigan Press.
- (1985) The Nuer Conquest: The Structure and Development of an Expansionist System. Ann Arbor: University of Michigan Press.
- (1977) Etoro Social Structure: A Study in Structural Contradiction. Ann Arbor: University of Michigan Press.
