= Wadi Kubbaniya =

Palaeolithic site in Egypt

- Location in Egypt
- 24.0925°N 32.785°E
- Periods: Late Paleolithic
- Location: Egypt

Site notes
- Archaeologists: Wendorf and Schild

Wadi Kubbaniya is a Late Paleolithic site in Upper Egypt. Archaeologists initially believed that the site held evidence for some of the earliest examples of agriculture. When Wadi Kubbaniya was discovered, there were traces of barley that were originally thought to be evidence of farming. It is now believed that this is most likely not the case. The site has been dated to between 19,000 and 17,000 years ago using radiocarbon dating. This site was a part of a settlement system that people would come back to during its prime seasons of summer and winter.

== Location ==
Wadi Kubbaniya is located in Southern Egypt. A wadi is a geographical term that describes a valley that would become filled with water and form a stream during the rainy season. Wadis are normally lush and are valuable land for those wanting to have fertile soil. They normally appear within deserts which make their occurrence especially appreciated. Wadi Kubbaniya is found on the western bank of the Nile River and is roughly 30 kilometers from Aswan. In the southwestern desert, Wadi Kubbaniya was one of the three principal paleo-drainage systems.

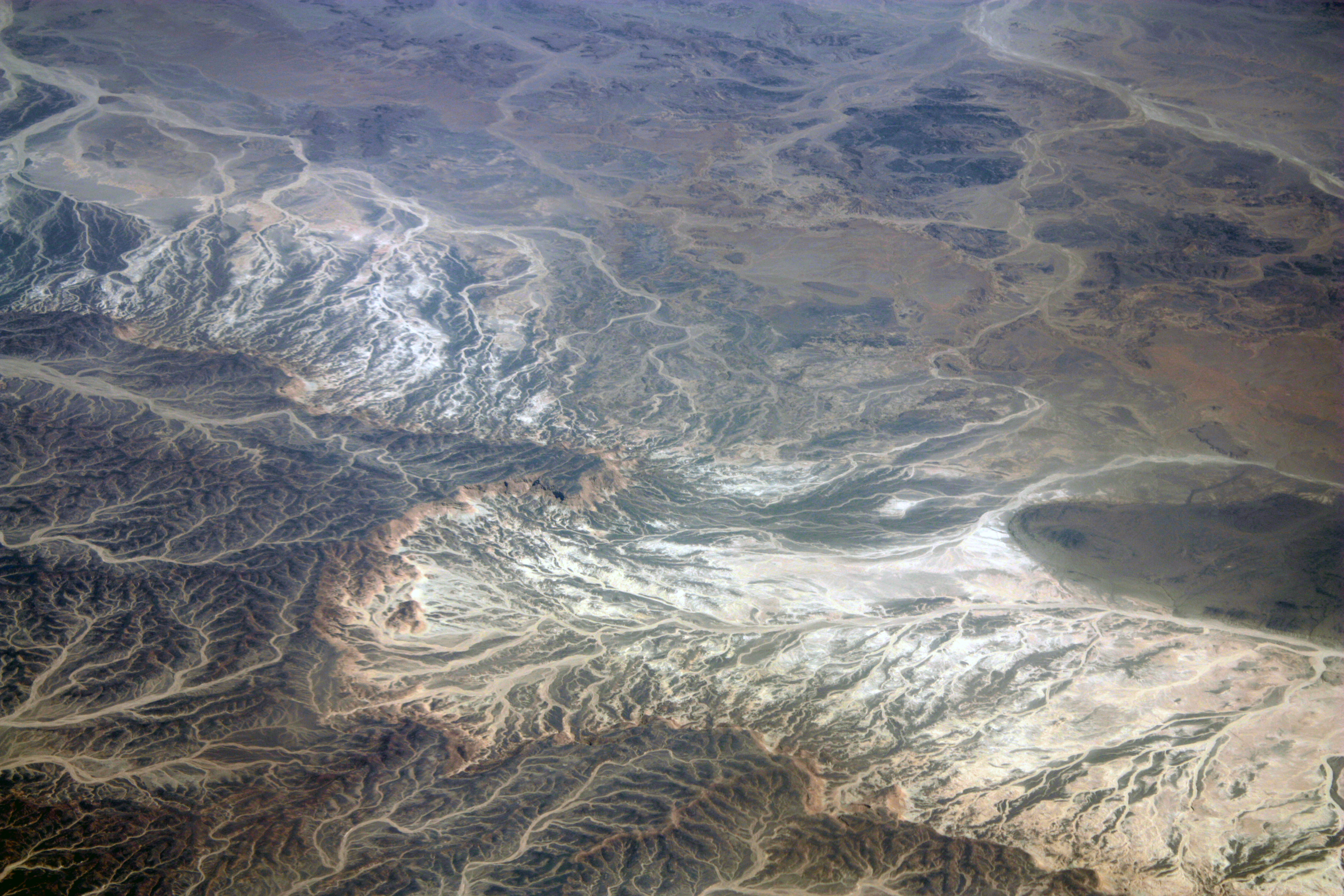
Example of a Wadi in Egypt, present day. A wadi is an area of land that is seasonally flooded. This flooding enriches the soil and makes it an ideal place for vegetation.

== Early agriculture ==
Discovered at the site were barley, lentils, chickpeas (or at least what they thought were chickpeas), and einkorn wheat. Of the plants discovered and identified at the Wadi Kubbaniya site, one of them stood out- barley. A sample was taken from a hearth and sent off for identification. From the sample, there were five grains, which were later identified as barley and einkorn wheat. Based on morphology, archaeologists could not definitively say whether these grains were domesticated or wild. However, archaeologists believed that these cereals could not have grown well without the assistance of humans. Therefore, if cereals were found at this site, and archaeologists believed that cereals could not survive without the intentional act of humans, this meant that this was a site of early farming and cultivation. The einkorn wheat is also commonly seen as a weed that accompanies Near Eastern crops. What bolstered their claim even more was the stone tools discovered. These tools were found with what they hypothesized to be as sickle sheen on them, which can be an indication of agricultural use. Archaeologists used these data and hypotheticals to propose the hypothesis that Wadi Kubbaniya is the earliest known site for agriculture.

However, through further investigation it was determined that the barley found was actually wild and was not an indication of early agriculture taking place at Wadi Kubbaniya. The lentils, which were uncharred, could not have been from any site earlier than 3000 B.C. What they thought were chickpeas ended up being a wild plant that is still found on the Nile today. Despite their hypothesis of early agriculture proving false, the time spent on recovering and studying samples has still proven useful. Due to their convictions of Wadi Kubbaniya being one of the earliest sites for agriculture, there was much time and effort put into carefully excavating plant remains from the soil. There is now a large and diverse collection of plant remains from Wadi Kubbaniya that tells us more about the area, hunter-gatherers, and possibly other Late Paleolithic sites in Egypt.

The earliest examples of plant domestication and crop cultivation from the Old World is currently attributed to sites like Netiv Hagdud and Gilgal, Jericho, and Tell Aswad, which all have evidence for fully domesticated crops.

== Archaeology ==
Wadi Kubbaniya was discovered by Fred Wendorf and Romuald Schild in January 1967 during the Combined Prehistoric Expedition. However, due to time constrictions, they postponed excavating the site. They then had to wait until 1977 for a permit to be granted due to war breaking out. Discoveries reported at Wadi Kubbaniya are: grinding stones, fish bones, charcoal, bird bones, mammal bones, and backed bladelets. Of the sites that produced plant remains, they were reoccupied numerous times. The individuals of the Late Paleolithic in Wadi Kubbaniya mainly survived on fish and plants of the root variety. From these discoveries, notably charred bits of human feces were found- probably from infants. This is significant as it provides direct evidence for human consumption of plants. It is thought that this site was repeatedly occupied during its prime seasons, summer and winter. Other pre-agrarian, hunter gatherer sites that report plant remains are Belilena, Ban Kao, and Abu Hureyra 157; however, these are all Mesolithic sites.

=== Skeleton ===
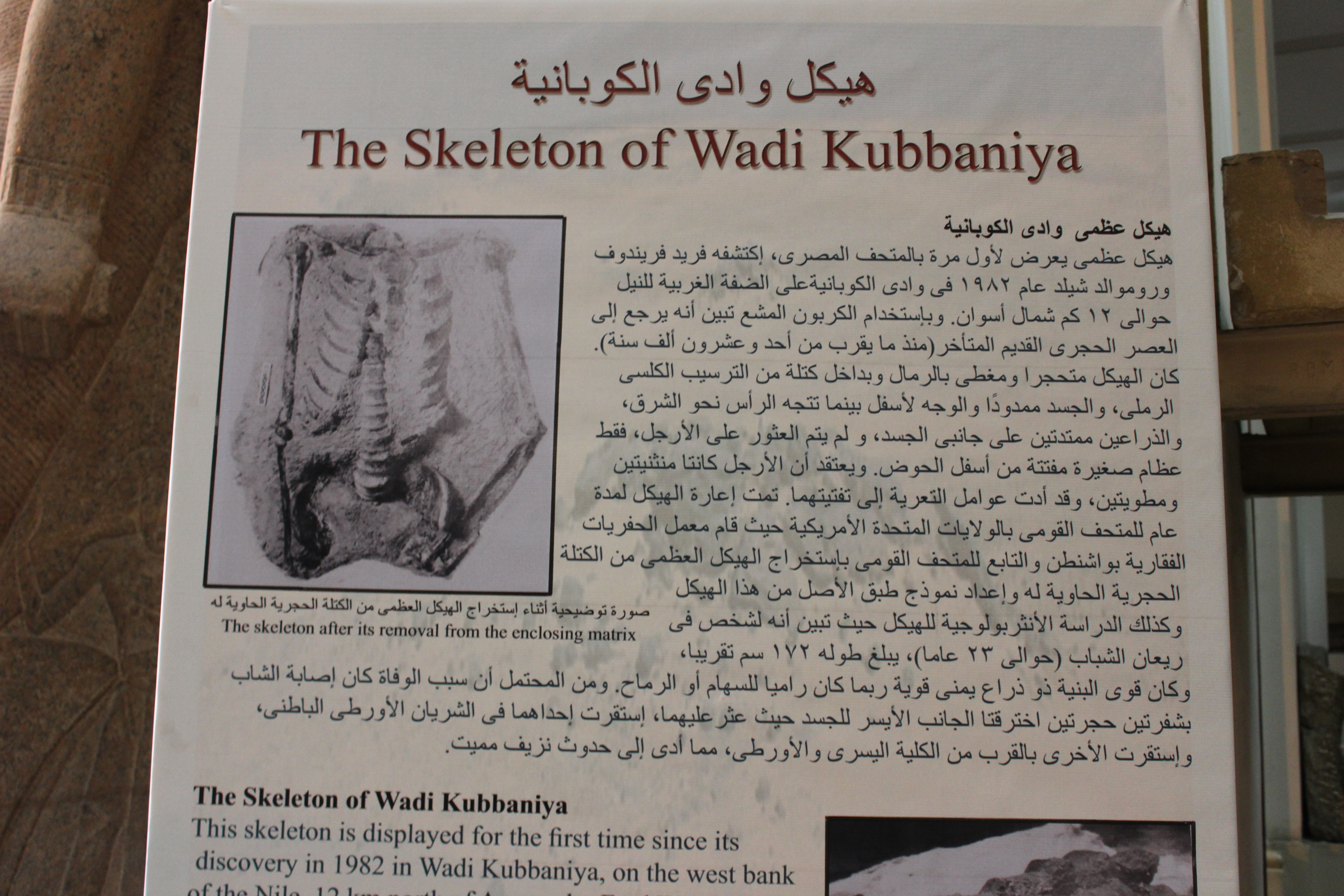
The skeleton found at Wadi Kubbaniya.

A Middle Paleolithic individual was also found entombed within a burial. The remains included part of a skull, lower jaw, the first three cervical vertebrae (fused), the rest of the vertebrae, pelvis, and assorted fragments from the upper and lower limb. This individual was buried face down and they found a chert and chalcedony bladelet around the lumbar vertebra. Blades were located near where there is observed breakage of the right ulna and left humerus; speculative evidence that they were involved in cause of death. However, the blades may have simply been buried with the corpse. Age and sex estimation were performed on the remains, leading to data describing the individual as a young man, possibly 20–25 years old. Biological sex is surmised through the skeleton having a valgus angle within the male range, broader shoulders compared to hips, a narrow pelvic brim, large femoral and humeral heads, evidence for more muscle mass, and a more prominent brow ridge. The age estimation is based on complete tooth eruptions, a closed coronal suture, and complete epiphyseal closure except in the medial heads of clavicles and heads of ribs. The hands show evidence of this individual working with more precision rather than participating in work that requires constant heavy lifting (i.e. farmer or smith); proposed skills include net-making (fisher) or blade-making (hunter).

=== Plant remains ===
Of the sixteen sites excavated, only four sites had evidence of plant remains and/or feces. These plant remains, overall, consist of fruits, tissues of soft vegetables, and 25 different types of seeds. The soft tissue of the vegetables were preserved due to its interaction with fire which acted as a type of conservation. This is significant as these soft tissues do not easily preserve in the archaeological record, and these are the first discovered from antiquity. These areas where plant remains were found were all overlooking what used to be the floodplain, on the top of dunes. One of the identified plants was barley, which is what lead early researchers to believe this site was the origin for early agriculture. But after more research was done it was found that all of the 13 identified plants were actually wild, and still grow wild in the Nile Valley today. These identified plant remains, or their near relatives, have been relied upon by modern hunter-gathers according to ethnohistorical records.

The nut-grass tubers that were found are known for having some toxins and a surplus of fibers. In order to eat these tubers consistently, these fibers and toxins need to be worked away. This can be done with boiling or grinding. The grinding stones found at the site are strong evidence that they ground these tubers to make them more edible.

Radiocarbon dates were published by The Tucson Laboratory. They are as follows: site E-78-3: 18,000-17,870bp; site E-81-1: 17,990- 17,210bp; site E-84-4: 17,810- 17,300bp with +/-150- +/-280 years in error range.

=== Recent discoveries ===
Site WK26 is a recently studied area in Wadi Kubbaniya. Work on this site began in 2014 by the Combined Prehistoric Expedition Foundation and the Aswan-Kom Ombo Archaeological Project (CPEF/AKAP). It is located to the west of the field site that Wendorf and Schild excavated during 1978 to 1983. The area was initially discovered in 2012. This site was theorized to be more recent than other excavated sites in Wadi Kubbaniya due to the discovery of an Ounan point; these points have been found in other areas of Egypt and were dated to the early to mid-Holocene. In Area A, during excavations they found 2 hearths, 19 postholes, and what remained of a pit. Of the stone tools discovered, they were determined to be basic technology- mostly made of Chert and Egyptian flint. Handstones and grinding stones were also found at the site and many of them had evidence of ochre on them. Six of these stone implements were tested for pollen, phytoliths, and starch. The pollen pointed to possible seed processing. From this testing, much evidence pointed to the people of this site having possessed tools such as sickles that they used on the available plants. Of the bones found, there were only Clarias, a type of fish. No mammal bones were present. Scientists theorized that the evidence of only fish indicated that this site was a dry season occupation zone. All of this evidence points to a people that had a complex and diverse system of providing for themselves.

== Lithics ==
=== Afian industry ===
From Wadi Kubbaniya, there have been lithics found that are attributed to the Afian industry. Site E-83-4 has been excavated and documented to have contained 461 pieces that resemble the Afian industry, with 262 being chips and chunks and 3 cores. The site has been dated to 16.5-15/14.5 cal ka BP during the time of usage of the Afian industry. Bladelets and long, small flakes are what characterize the Afian industry. The presence of retouched tools and the Levallois technique is sometimes observed in this assemblage. The discovery of the Afian industry here is significant because it suggests multiple occupations.

=== Silsilian industry ===
A site in Wadi Kubbaniya has also been associated with the Silsilian industry. A non-Levallois technique that uses triangular and trapezoidal tool forms. One third of this collection was blank production. Wendorf and Schild pointed out that the artifacts found from this assemblage are not like anything they had observed in Upper Egypt. 2063 artifacts were collected from site E-78-5e which shows evidence for a blade industry with materials of mainly chert, but also agate, granite, jasper, quartz, and chalcedony. Over 9000 artifacts attributed to the Silsilian industry were found at site E-84-2. This assemblage has been dated to between 18.7 cal ka BP and 17.5 cal ka BP. From this sample, most of the artifacts found were blades. Some argue that the Silsilian industry is really a part of the Ballanan, and spans from northern Upper Egypt to Nubia.
