= Qadan culture =

Culture in Upper Egypt approximately 15,000 years ago

Qadan Culture
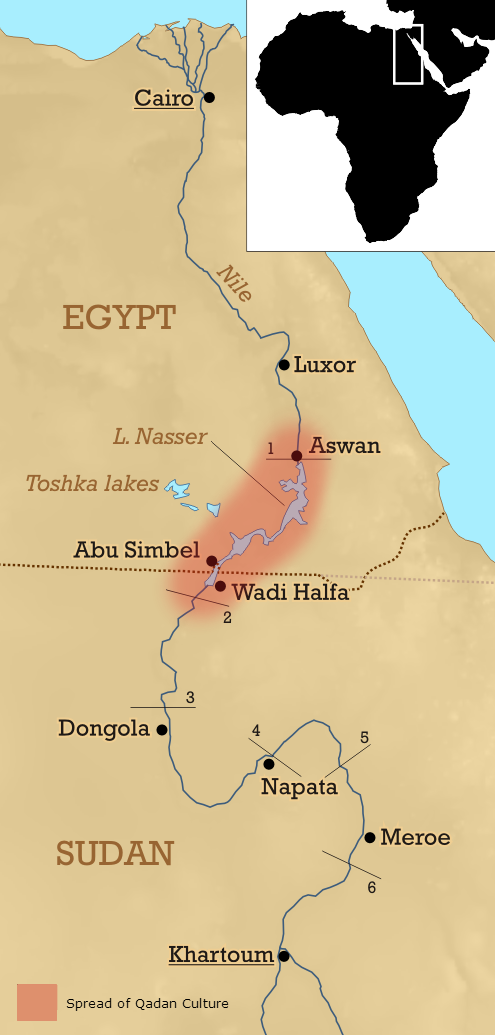
- Geographical range: Nubia
- Period: Mesolithic
- Dates: 15,000 BP — 11,000 BP
- Major sites: Cemetery 117
- Preceded by: Sebilian
- Followed by: Jebel Sahaba

The Qadan culture (13000-9000 BCE) was an ancient culture that, archaeological evidence suggests, originated in Nubia approximately 15,000 years ago. This way of life is estimated to have persisted for approximately 4,000 years, and was characterized by hunting, as well as a unique approach to food gathering that incorporated the preparation and consumption of wild grasses and grains. Systematic efforts were made by the Qadan people to water, care for, and harvest local plant life, but grains were not planted in ordered rows.

Sites from this period span from the Second Cataract of the Nile to Tushka, situated approximately 250 kilometers upriver from Aswan.

In archaeological terms, the Qadan culture is generally viewed as a cluster of Mesolithic Stage communities living in Nubia in the upper Nile Valley prior to 9000 BCE. At a time of relatively high water levels in the Nile, it is characterized by a diverse stone tool industry that is taken to represent increasing degrees of specialization and locally differentiated regional groupings. Large numbers of grinding stones and blades have been found with glossy films of silica on them, which could possibly be the result of cutting grass stems on their surfaces. There is some evidence of conflict between the groups, suggesting periods of invasion or intense inter-tribal war. In fact, about 40 percent of individuals buried in the Jebel Sahaba cemetery near the border of Sudan on the Nile river show signs of fatal wounds caused by projectiles, from weapons such as spears, darts, or arrows. The remains found in the cemeteries suggest that ritual burials were practiced.

The Qadan economy was based on fishing, hunting, and, as mentioned, the extensive use of wild grain.

Linguist Christopher Ehret has identified the Qadan culture with the Proto-Afroasiatic homeland; the absence of agricultural terms in The Proto-Afroasiatic Language indicates they were grain collectors rather than farmers similar to the Qadan culture, and the diversity of Afrasian languages in Africa rather than west Asia suggests a North east African origin for the language family, Proto-Afroasiatic was likely spoken between 18,000 and 8,000 BCE overlapping with the archaeological age of the Qadan culture.
