= Fred Wendorf =

American prehistorian (1924–2015)

- Born: 31 July 1924; Terrell, Texas
- Died: 15 July 2015 (aged 90); Dallas, Texas
- Education: Harvard University
- Spouse: Christy Bednar
- Children: (6) Gail, Cindy, Kelly, Carl, Michael and Scott
- Awards: Fellow of National Academy of Sciences (1987); Distinguished Service Medal for Conservation Service (1988); Lucy Wharton Drexel Medal for Archaeological Achievement (1996); Egyptian Geological Survey Award (1997); Fellow of Polish Academy of Arts and Sciences (2012)
- Scientific career
- Fields: Archaeology
- Workplaces: Texas Tech University, Southern Methodist University

Denver Fred Wendorf (July 31, 1924 – July 15, 2015) was an American archaeologist known primarily for his groundbreaking research in northeast Africa. He also founded the Fort Burgwin Research Center and Department of Anthropology at Southern Methodist University, where he was Henderson-Morrison Professor of Prehistory. He won numerous awards throughout his career and was a member of the United States National Academy of Sciences.

== Biography ==
Wendorf had an interest in the field of archaeology ever since his childhood when at the age of 8 Wendorf began to find and collect arrowheads. Wendorf started studying archaeology collegiately in 1942 at the University of Arizona. However, it was cut short due to serving in World War II as a rifle platoon leader with the 86th Infantry Regiment of the U.S. Army’s 10th Mountain Division. Wendorf resumed his studies one year later after suffering a battle wound to his arm. This injury and the experience behind it earned Wendorf a Purple Heart and a Bronze Star. Wendorf continued his college education at colleges close to whatever military hospital he was reporting to. This included the University of Michigan. Wendorf received his bachelor's degree from the University of Arizona in 1948, then his doctorate degree of Harvard University in 1953. Wendorf's first archaeology job was in New Mexico at a construction site of a natural gas pipeline. This involved Wendorf excavating roughly one hundred and fifty sites off this pipeline. He then became a research archaeologist with the Museum of New Mexico in Santa Fe. Soon after Wendorf was contacted by an amateur archaeologist about the remains of human bone fragments that he had previously found around Midland. This excavation took place at what is now known as the “Midland Man” site and was a milestone for Wendorf. Following this excavation Wendorf joined the staff of what is now Texas Tech University where he held the first ever summer archaeological field school. In 1958 he went back to being the associate director at the Museum of New Mexico. Wendorf was one of the first archaeologists to answer an international plea to excavate along the Nile River Valley.

Wendorf created SMU’s anthropology department in 1964. At this time Wendorf switched his archaeological focus from the American Southwest to northeast Africa. Wendorf expanded his work by getting involved in the protection of historical shipwrecks. His investigations eventually led to the Abandoned Shipwrecks act of 1987, which protects historical shipwrecks in the United States. Wendorf was the director of the Combined Prehistoric Expedition until 1999. This expedition was in Africa and covered from the early stone age till around to late Bronze Age and has given us a tremendous amount of insight on behavior during those historic times along the Nile and in the desserts. Wendorf's work has won him many awards including;

- Received a medal from the supreme council of antiques of Egypt in 1974
- Elected into the National Academy of Sciences in 1987
- Received a Lucy Wharton Drexl Medal for archaeological achievement in 1996

Wendorf retired in 2003. Wendorf died on Wednesday, July 15, 2015 due to a long term illness. He was a father to his three daughters, Gail Wendorf, Cindy Ruiz and Kelly Wendorf, and to his three sons, Carl Wendorf, Michael Wendorf and Scott Wendorf. Denver Fred Wendorf was a husband to his wife Christy Bednar and a brother to his sisters, Mildred DiMaggio and Mary Ann Stripling.

== Bibliography ==
- Prehistory of the Eastern Sahara. Studies in Archaeology. Academic Press. 1980. ISBN 978-0-12-743960-0.
- Egypt During the Last Interglacial. Springer. 1993. ISBN 978-0-306-44409-8. (with Romuald Schild, Angela E. Close)
- Holocene Settlement of the Egyptian Sahara: Volume 1: The Archaeology of Nabta Playa. Springer. 2001. ISBN 978-0-306-46612-0. (with Romuald Schild)
- Fort Burgwin Research Center. Southern Methodist University Press. 2007. ISBN 978-0-9795372-0-2. (with James E. Brooks)
- Desert Days: My Life As a Field Archaeologist. Southern Methodist University Press. 2008. ISBN 978-0-87074-524-9.

== See also ==
- Cantonment Burgwin
- Cemetery 117
