= Lithic technology =

Ancient production techniques

In archaeology, lithic technology includes a broad array of techniques used to produce usable tools from various types of stone. The earliest stone tools to date have been found at the site of Lomekwi 3 (LOM3) in Kenya and they have been dated to around 3.3 million years ago. The archaeological record of lithic technology is divided into three major time periods: the Paleolithic (Old Stone Age), Mesolithic (Middle Stone Age), and Neolithic (New Stone Age). Not all cultures in all parts of the world exhibit the same pattern of lithic technological development, and stone tool technology continues to be used to this day, but these three time periods represent the span of the archaeological record when lithic technology was paramount. By analysing modern stone tool usage within an ethnoarchaeological context, insight into the breadth of factors influencing lithic technologies in general may be studied. See: Stone tool. For example, for the Gamo of Southern Ethiopia, political, environmental, and social factors influence the patterns of technology variation in different subgroups of the Gamo culture; through understanding the relationship between these different factors in a modern context, archaeologists can better understand the ways that these factors could have shaped the technological variation that is present in the archaeological record.

== Raw materials ==
Useful raw materials all have common characteristics, which make them ideal for stone tool production. To make a stone material ideal for tool production, it must be non-crystalline or glassy, which allows for conchoidal fracturing. These characteristics allow the person forming the stone (the flintknapper) to control the reduction precisely to make a wide variety of tools.

There are numerous factors as to why some raw materials would be chosen over others and can result in the use of low quality materials. A few examples of such factors include the availability of materials, the proximity to materials, and the quality of materials. To help understand this, archaeologists have applied models of risk management to stone artifacts. Theories have suggested that in times of high risk, more effort will be put into acquiring high quality material that is more reliable and can be maintained over longer periods of time. In times of low risk, lower quality materials may be acquired from closer sources. However, Mackay and Marwick (2011) found that this pattern does not always hold true in their application of this theory to the South African Pleistocene record. They then used computer simulations to understand why the relationship between the time put into producing technology and subsistence acquisition would produce the patterns they saw. Mackay and Marwick found that when less time was put into acquiring material for and producing technology, that extra time increased the chances of encounters and thus increases the chances of acquiring more resources in a shorter period of time. This demonstrates that raw material choice is not always straightforward, nor are high quality materials always sought out.

Some types of raw materials are:

- Agate
- Basalt
- Chalcedony
- Chert
- Diorite
- Flint
- Greenstone
- Jadeite
- Jasper
- Obsidian
- Onyx
- Quartz
- Quartzite
- Sandstone
- Schist
- Silcrete

== Manufacture ==
Stone tools are manufactured using a process known as lithic reduction. The technique used is dependent upon the level of detail required for the desired tool. The technique with the least detail is conducted using a hammerstone, in which a hard rock (often sandstone) is struck against the raw material to chip off large flakes and begin to shape the stone. Using a hammerstone produces what is called a preform, which is the core of the tool in need of more detailed refinements. The next technique allows for an increased level of detail; using a soft hammer (often made of wood or bone), one can chip away flakes of material with more precision. The most precise technique is known as pressure flaking. This technique involves pressing small flakes off rather than by means of percussion. Bone and antlers are often used as punches to create a precisely detailed tool. Another technique, known as indirect percussion, combines the use of a punch and a hammer to apply pressure to a precise area of the stone. For the most part, stone cores can only be used to a certain extent before they become exhausted cores. As such, it is typically the flakes, or debitage, that are the basis for stone tools. The flakes are shaped using the lithic reduction techniques, allowing for creation of various tools such as arrowheads and handaxes.

Two stone characteristics will determine whether one is able to chip away large enough flakes to make tools out of: whether the stone is of a cryptocrystalline structure, and how conchoidally the stone fractures. A cryptocrystalline stone is one that is made up of minute crystals that can only be seen with a microscope. Conchoidal fractures are described as smooth, curved breaks from the base stone. Stones that have both of these characteristics allow for flakes that are big and sharp enough for a variety of tools to be made. Obsidian is a great example of a material that is perfect for making tools with, as it is both cryptocrystalline and it fractures conchoidally. Many early Middle Eastern and American civilizations used obsidian as a basis for tools as its internal structure made it easier to chip away than most of the other stones in the area.

During an experiment conducted by Dibble and Whittaker, they found that the angle hit at the exterior platform would produce different flake types. The exterior platform angle is an angle formed by hitting the intersection of the platform surface and the exterior of the core. When hitting the core at a low exterior platform angle, a feather termination is produced. When the exterior platform angle is hit near a mid-range to low angle, a hinge termination is produced. The highest exterior platforms produce the overshoots. The desired termination is generally the feather termination due to its sharp edge.

== See also ==
- Knapping
- Experimental archaeology
- Tranchet axe
