= Prehistoric Egypt =

Period before the First Dynasty of Egypt

Prehistoric Egypt / Predynastic Egypt
- 300,000 BCE–3100 BCE
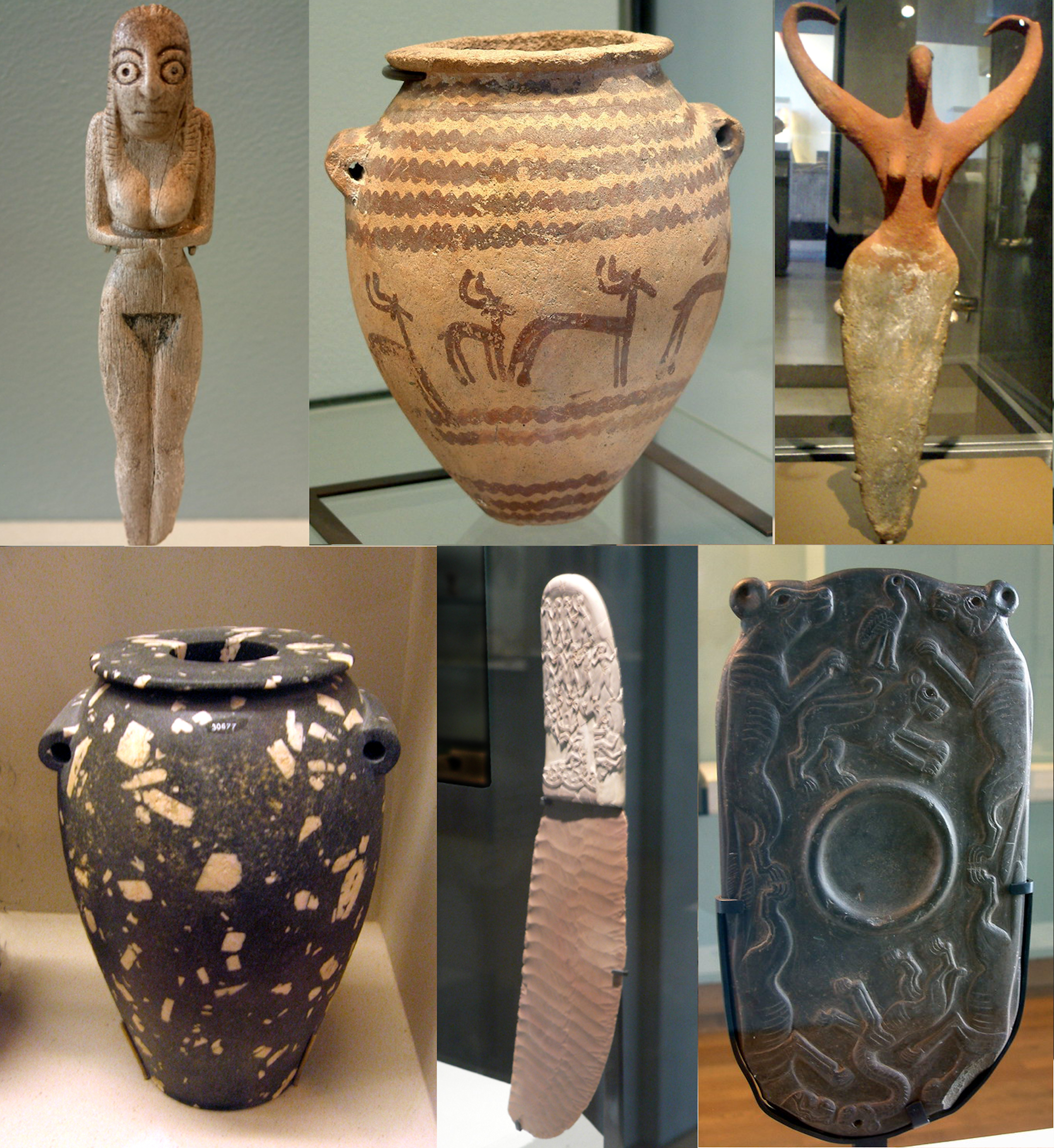
- Artifacts of Egypt from the Prehistoric period, from 4400 to 3100 BC. First row from top left: a Badarian ivory figurine, a Naqada jar, a Bat figurine. Second row: a diorite vase, a flint knife, a cosmetic palette.
- Common languages: Egyptian
- Religion: Proto-religion
- Demonym: Egyptian
- Historical era: Prehistory
  - Established: 300,000 BCE
  - Unification: 3100 BCE
Succeeded by
Early Dynastic Period
- Today part of: Egypt

Prehistoric Egypt and Predynastic Egypt was the period of time starting at the first human occupation of the region and ending at the First Dynasty of Egypt around 3100 BC.

At the end of prehistory, "Predynastic Egypt" is traditionally defined as the period from the final part of the Neolithic period beginning c. 6210 BC to the end of the Naqada III period c. 3000 BC. The dates of the Predynastic period were first defined before widespread archaeological excavation of Egypt took place, and recent finds indicating a gradual Predynastic development have led to controversy over when exactly the Predynastic period ended. Thus, various terms such as "Protodynastic period", "Zero Dynasty" or "Dynasty 0" are used to name the part of the period which might be characterized as Predynastic by some and Early Dynastic by others.

The Predynastic period is generally divided into cultural eras, each named after the place where a certain type of Egyptian settlement was first discovered. However, the same gradual development that characterizes the Protodynastic period is present throughout the entire Predynastic period, and individual "cultures" must not be interpreted as separate entities but as largely subjective divisions used to facilitate study of the entire period.

The vast majority of Predynastic archaeological finds have been in Upper Egypt, because the silt of the Nile River was more heavily deposited at the Delta region, completely burying most Delta sites long before modern times.

== Paleolithic ==
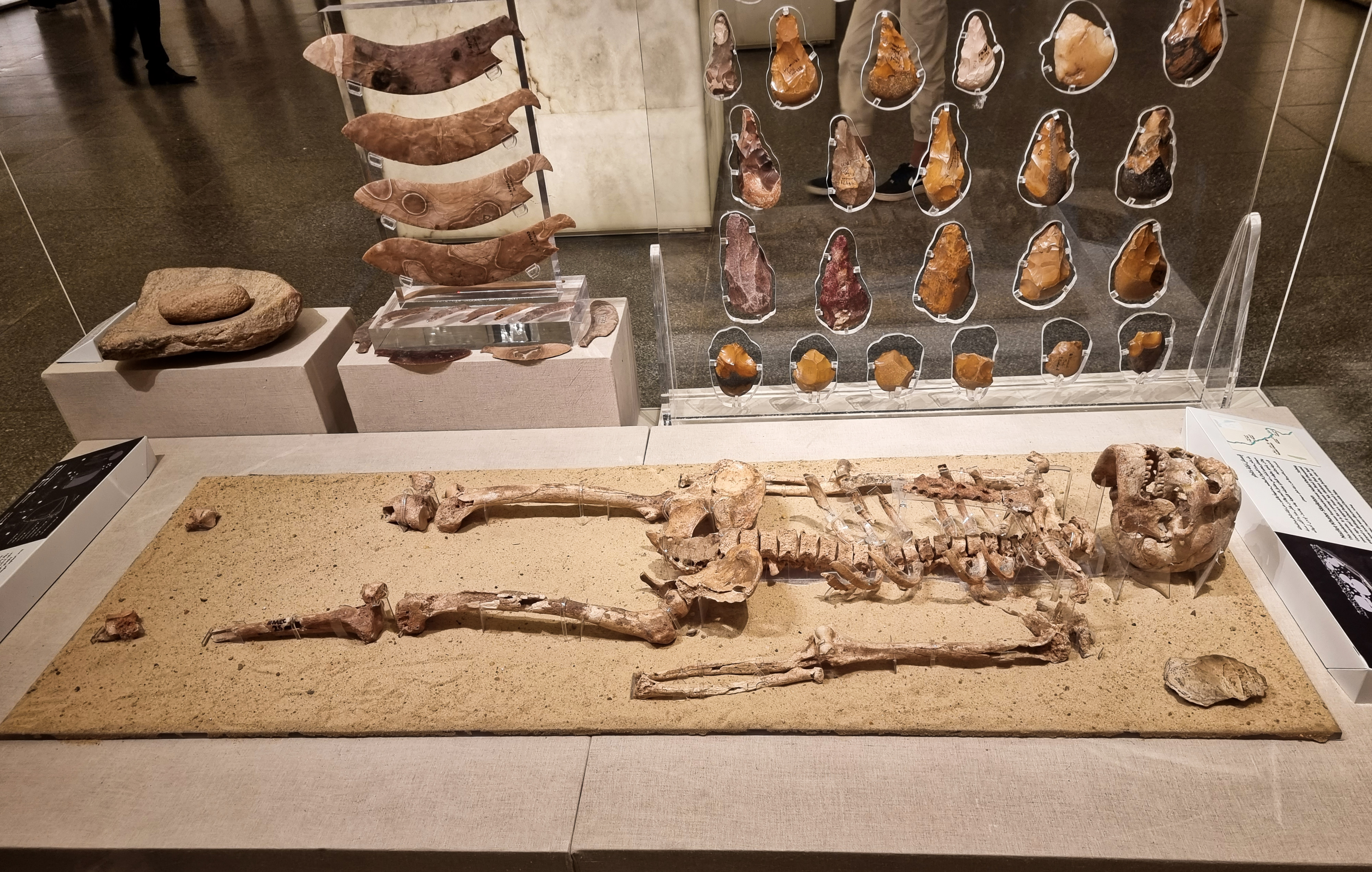
Nazlet Khater skeleton, Upper Paleolithic, 35,000 before present; National Museum of Egyptian Civilization, Cairo

It is theorized that Egypt has been inhabited by humans (including archaic humans) for over a million (and probably over 2 million) years, though the evidence for early occupation of Egypt is sparse and fragmentary. The oldest archaeological finds in Egypt, stone tools belonging to the Oldowan industry, are poorly dated. These tools are succeeded by those belonging to the Acheulean industry. The youngest Achulean sites in Egypt date to around 400,000–300,000 years ago.

During the Late Pleistocene, when Egypt was occupied by modern humans, several archaeological industries are recognised including the Silsilian, Fakhurian, Afian, Kubbaniyan, Idfuan-Shuwikhatian, and the Isnan industries.

=== Wadi Halfa ===
Some of the oldest known structures were discovered in Egypt by archaeologist Waldemar Chmielewski along the southern border near Wadi Halfa, Sudan, at the Arkin 8 site. Chmielewski dated the structures to 100,000 BC. The remains of the structures are oval depressions about 30 cm deep and 2 × 1 meters across. Many are lined with flat sandstone slabs which served as tent rings supporting a dome-like shelter of skins or brush. This type of dwelling provided a place to live, but if necessary, could be taken down easily and transported. They were mobile structures—easily disassembled, moved, and reassembled—providing hunter-gatherers with semi-permanent habitation.

=== Aterian industry ===
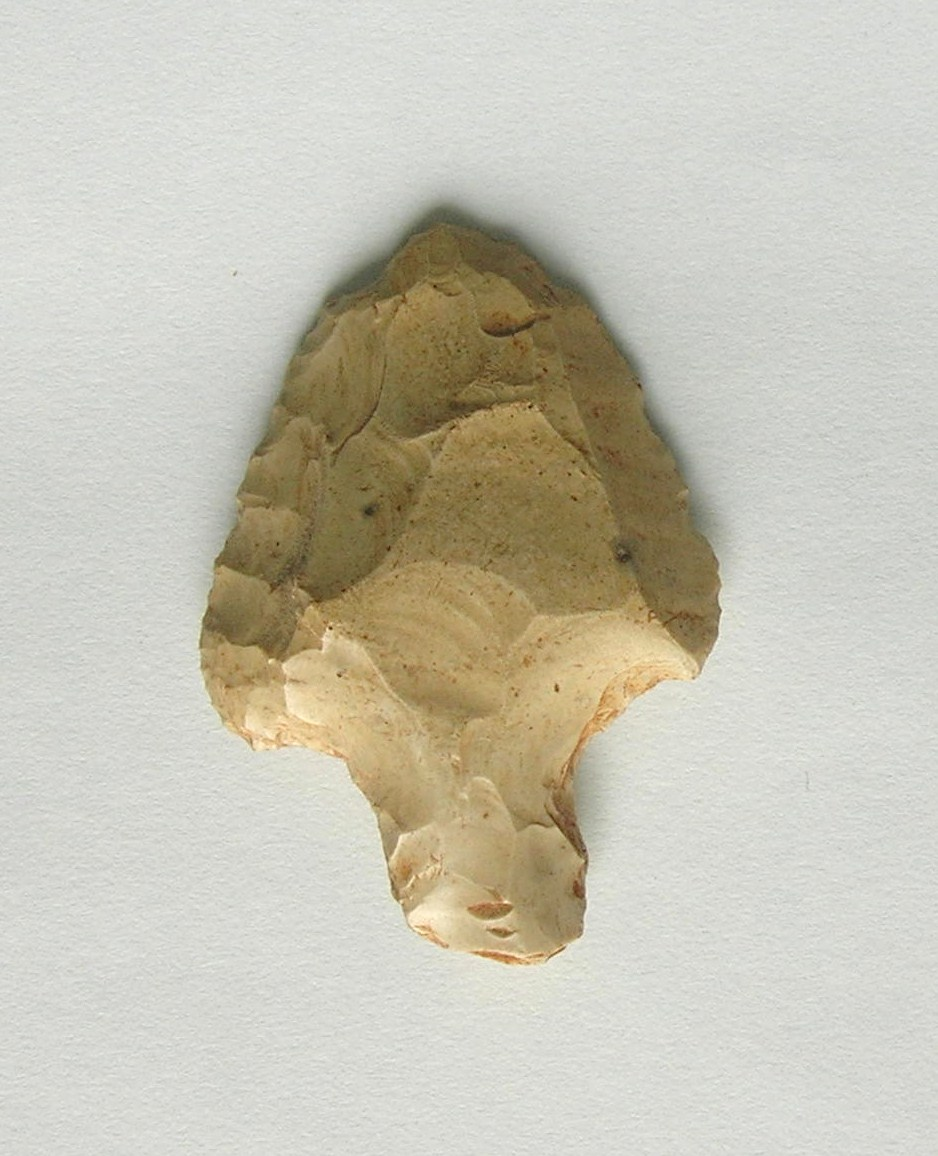
Aterian point from Zaccar, Djelfa region, Algeria.

Aterian tool-making reached Egypt c. 42,000 BP.

=== Khormusan industry ===
The Khormusan industry in Egypt began between 42,000 and 32,000 BP. Khormusans developed tools not only from stone but also from animal bones and hematite. They also developed small arrow heads resembling those of Native Americans, but no bows have been found. The end of the Khormusan industry came around 16,000 B.C. with the appearance of other cultures in the region, including the Gemaian.

=== Late Paleolithic ===
The Late Paleolithic in Egypt started around 32,000 BP. The Nazlet Khater skeleton was found in 1980 and given an age of 33,000 years in 1982, based on nine samples ranging between 35,100 and 30,360 years old. This specimen is the only complete modern human skeleton so far found from the earliest Late Stone Age in Africa.

The Fakhurian late Paleolithic industry in Upper Egypt, showed that a homogenous population existed in the Nile-Valley during the late Pleistocene. Studies of the skeletal material showed they were in the range of variation found in the Wadi Halfa, Jebel Sahaba and fragments from the Kom Ombo populations.

The site of Wadi Kubbaniya in Upper Egypt was inhabited during the Late Paleolithic. Archaeological excavations at the site have found the remains of a number of crops, including barley and wheat. It is believed that the site was seasonally occupied, with the population responding to the annual inundation of the Nile River. The inhabitants of this settlement primarily lived around the dune field that dominates much of the landscape. A variety of plant remains, lithic tools, hearths, and grinding stones have all been uncovered during excavations at the site.

== Mesolithic (c. 20000 to 6000 BC) ==
=== Halfan and Kubbaniyan culture ===
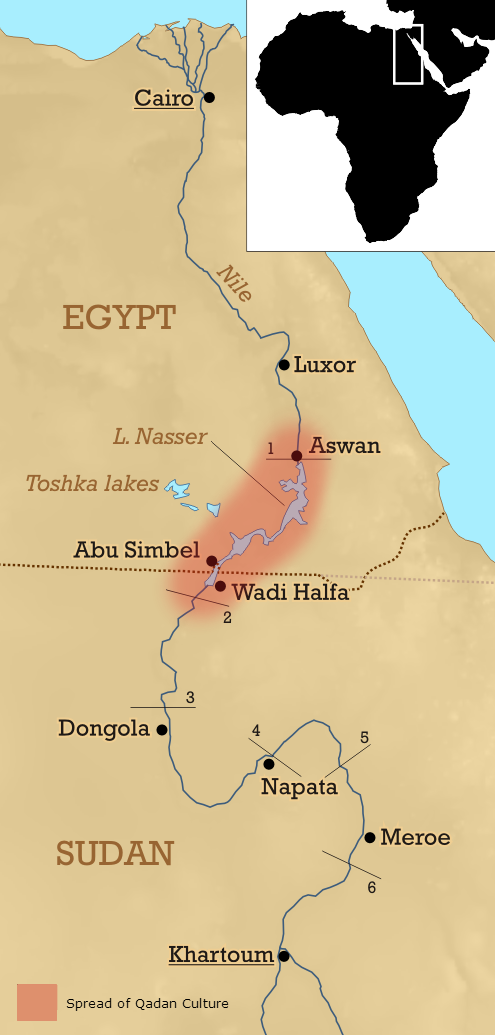
Location of the Qadan culture

The Halfan and Kubbaniyan, two closely related industries, flourished along the Upper Nile Valley. Halfan sites are found in the far north of Sudan, whereas Kubbaniyan sites are found in Upper Egypt. For the Halfan, only four radiocarbon dates have been produced. Schild and Wendorf (2014) discard the earliest and latest as erratic and conclude that the Halfan existed c. 22.5-22.0 ka cal BP (22,500-22,000 calibrated years before present). People survived on a diet of large herd animals and the Khormusan tradition of fishing. Greater concentrations of artifacts indicate that they were not bound to seasonal wandering, but settled for longer periods. The Halfan culture was derived in turn from the Khormusan, (Note: The Khormusan is defined as a Middle Palaeolithic industry while the Halfan is defined as an Epipalaeolithic industry. According to scholarly opinion, the Khormusan and the Halfan are viewed as separate and distinct cultures.) which depended on specialized hunting, fishing, and collecting techniques for survival. The primary material remains of this culture are stone tools, flakes, and a multitude of rock paintings.

=== Sebilian culture ===
The Sebilian culture began around 13,000 BC and vanished around 10,000 BC. In Egypt, analyses of pollen found at archaeological sites indicate that the people of the Sebilian culture (also known as the Esna culture) were gathering grains, though domesticated seeds were not found. It has been hypothesized that the sedentary lifestyle practiced by these grain gatherers led to increased warfare, which was detrimental to sedentary life and brought this period to an end.

=== Qadan culture ===
The Qadan culture (13,000–9,000 BC) was a Mesolithic industry that, archaeological evidence suggests, originated in Upper Egypt (present-day south Egypt) approximately 15,000 years ago. The Qadan subsistence mode is estimated to have persisted for approximately 4,000 years. It was characterized by hunting, as well as a unique approach to food gathering that incorporated the preparation and consumption of wild grasses and grains. Systematic efforts were made by the Qadan people to water, care for, and harvest local plant life, but grains were not planted in ordered rows.

Around twenty archaeological sites in Upper Nubia give evidence for the existence of the Qadan culture's grain-grinding culture. Its makers also practiced wild grain harvesting along the Nile during the beginning of the Sahaba Daru Nile phase, when desiccation in the Sahara caused residents of the Libyan oases to retreat into the Nile valley. Among the Qadan culture sites is the Jebel Sahaba cemetery, which has been dated to the Mesolithic.

Qadan peoples were the first to develop sickles and they also developed grinding stones independently to aid in the collecting and processing of these plant foods prior to consumption. However, there are no indications of the use of these tools after 10,000 BC, when hunter-gatherers replaced them.

== Pre-Dynastic Egypt (c. 6000-3000 BC) ==
The term "Pre-Dynastic" often cover the subsequent Neolithic as well as the Chalcolithic periods, starting circa 6000-5500 BC.

=== Neolithic (c. 6000-4000 BC) ===
Early evidence for Neolithic cultures in the Nile Valley are generally located in the north of Egypt, exhibiting well-developed stages of Neolithic subsistence, including the cultivation of crops and sedentism, as well as pottery production from the late 6th Millennium BC onwards.

==== Neolithic anthropology ====
The natural scientist Frédéric Falkenburger in 1947, based on a sample set of around 1,800 prehistoric Egyptian crania, noted great heterogeneity amongst his samples. Falkenburger categorized them based on the nasal index, overall head and face form, taking into account width, eye socket structure, amongst other given indicators. He divided and characterized the skulls into four types: Cro-Magnon type, "Negroid" type, Mediterranean type, and mixed types resulting from the mixture of the aforementioned groups. Similarly, the craniometrics of early Egyptians were according to the physician and anthropologist Eugene Strouhal in 1971, designated as either Cro-Magnon of North Africa, Mediterranean, "Negroid" of East Africa, and intermediate/mixed.

According to professor Fekhri A. Hassan, the peopling of the Egyptian Nile Valley from archaeological and biological data, was the result of a complex interaction between coastal northern Africans, "neolithic" Saharans, Nilotic hunters, and riverine proto-Nubians with some influence and migration from the Levant (Hassan, 1988).

Egypt was one of the first areas to adopt the Neolithic package emerging from West Asia as early as the 6th millennium BCE. In particular, goats and sheep, which are not indigenous to Africa, were introduced from the Neolithic Levant around 6000 BCE, probably through the Sinai Peninsula, followed by a rapid spread. Population genetics in the Nile Valley observed a marked change around this period, as shown by odontometric and dental tissue changes. Cultural exchange and trade between the two regions, including Egypt-Mesopotamia relations, then continued through the 4th millennium BCE, as shown by the transfer of Mesopotamian Late Uruk period features to the Nile Valley of the later Predynastic Period. Migration flows from Mesopotamia accompanied such cultural exchanges, possibly through the sea routes of the Mediterranean and the Red Sea or through yet un-sampled intermediaries in the Levant, which could explain the relative sparsity of genetic influence from known Chalcolithic/Bronze Age Levantine populations.

==== Lower Egypt ====
===== Faiyum B, Qarunian culture =====
Faiyum B culture, also called Qarunian due to being of the Lake Qarun or Qaroun area is an Epipalaeolithic (also called Mesolithic) culture and predates Faiyum A culture. No pottery has been found, with blade types being both plain and microlithic blades. A set of gouges and arrow-heads suggests it may have had contact with the Sahara (c. 6500 to - 5190 BC).

Maciej Henneberg (1989) documented a remote 8,000 year old female skull from the Qarunian. It showed closest affinity to Wadi Halfa, modern African groups and Aboriginal Australians, being quite different from Epipalaeolithic materials of Northern Africa usually labelled as Mechta-Afalou (Paleo-Berber) or the later Proto-Mediterranean types (Capsian). The skull still had an intermediate position, being gracile, but possessing large teeth and a heavy set jaw. Similar results would later be found by a short report from SOY Keita in 2021, showing affinities with the Qarunian skull and the Teita series.

===== Faiyum A culture =====
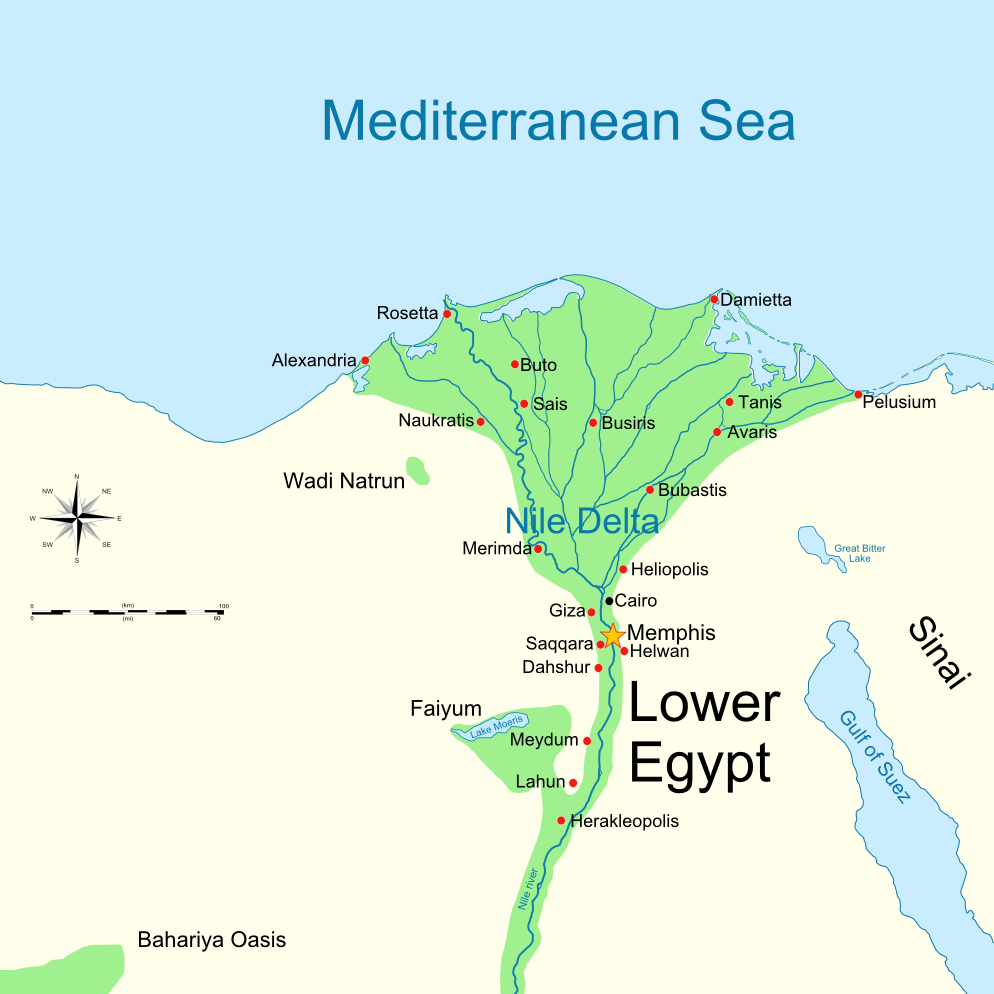
Map of Lower Egypt, and location of the Faiyum Oasis

Dating to about 5600-4400 BC of the Faiyum Neolithic, continued expansion of the desert forced the early ancestors of the Egyptians to settle around the Nile more permanently, adopting increasingly sedentary lifestyles. The Faiyum A industry is the earliest farming culture in the Nile Valley. Archaeological deposits that have been found are characterized by concave base projectile points and pottery. Around 6210 BC, Neolithic settlements appear all over Egypt. Some studies based on morphological, genetic, and archaeological data have attributed these settlements to migrants from the Fertile Crescent in the Near East returning during the Egyptian and North African Neolithic, bringing agriculture to the region.

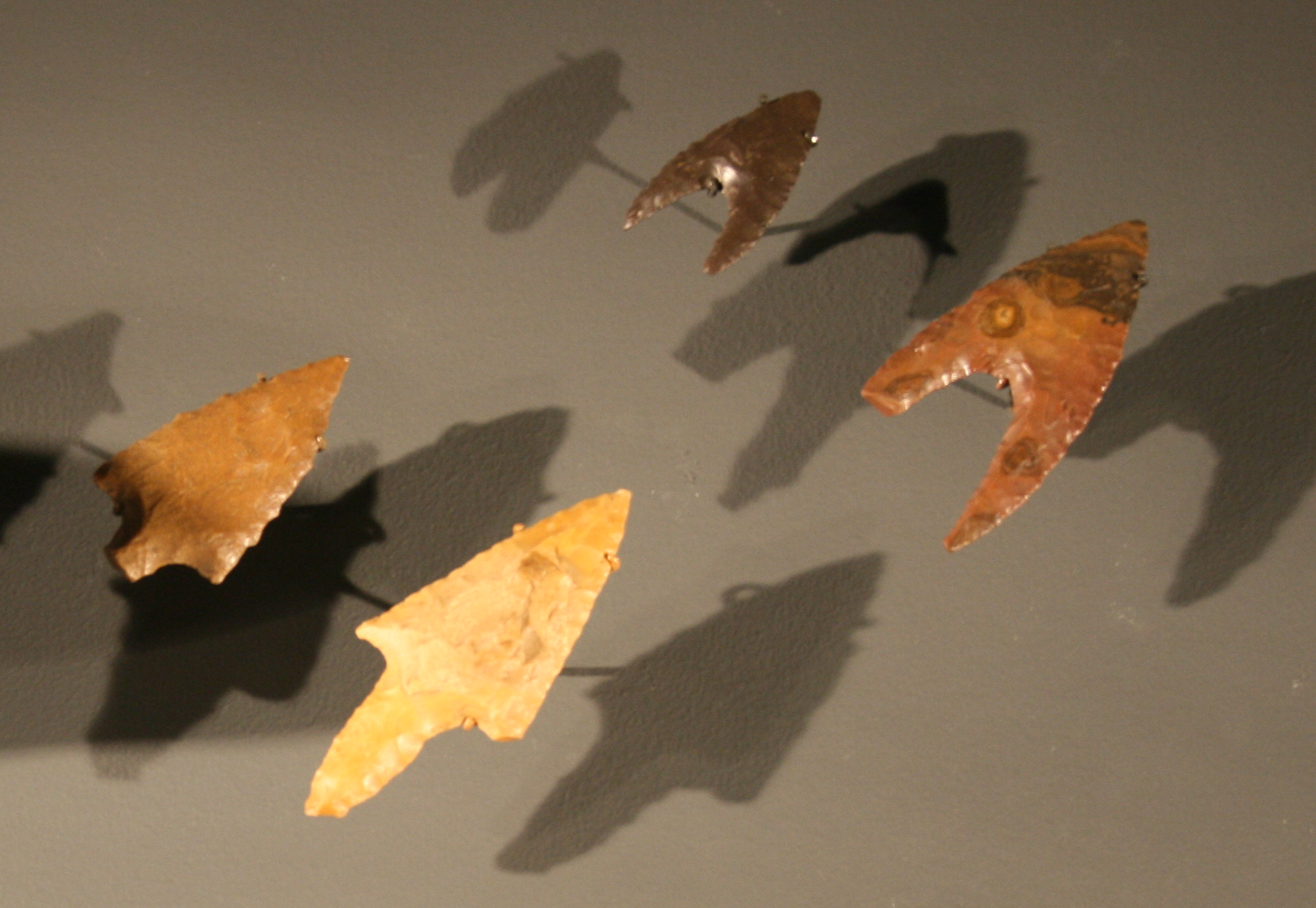
Arrowheads from Al Faiyum

Studies in anthropology and post-cranial data has linked the earliest farming populations at Faiyum, Merimde, and El-Badari, to Near Eastern populations. The archaeological data also suggests that Near Eastern domesticates were incorporated into a pre-existing foraging strategy and only slowly developed into a full-blown lifestyle. (Note: Settler colonists from the Near East would most likely have merged with the indigenous cultures resulting in a mixed economy with the agricultural aspect of the economy increasing in frequency through time, which is what the archaeological record more precisely indicates. Both pottery, lithics, and economy with Near Eastern characteristics, and lithics with North African characteristics are present in the Fayum A culture.) Finally, the names for the Near Eastern domesticates imported into Egypt were not Sumerian or Proto-Semitic loan words.

However, some scholars have disputed this view and cited linguistic, physical anthropological, archaeological and genetic data which does not support the hypothesis of a mass migration from the Levant during the prehistoric period. According to historian William Stiebling and archaeologist Susan N. Helft, this view posits that the ancient Egyptians are the same original population group as Nubians and other Saharan populations, with some genetic input from Arabian, Levantine, North African, and Indo-European groups who have known to have settled in Egypt during its long history. On the other hand, Stiebling and Helft acknowledge that the genetic studies of North African populations generally suggest a big influx of Near Eastern populations during the Neolithic Period or earlier. They also added that there have only been a few studies on ancient Egyptian DNA to clarify these issues.

Egyptologist Ian Shaw (2003) wrote that "anthropological studies suggest that the predynastic population included a mixture of racial types (Negroid, Mediterranean and European)", but it is the skeletal material at the beginning of the pharaonic period that has proven to be most controversial. He said according to some scholars there may have been a much slower period of demographic change, than previously hypothesized rapid conquests of people coming into Egypt from the East. It probably involved the gradual infiltration of a different physical type from Syria-Palestine, via the eastern Delta.

Weaving is evidenced for the first time during the Faiyum A Period. People of this period, unlike later Egyptians, buried their dead very close to, and sometimes inside, their settlements.

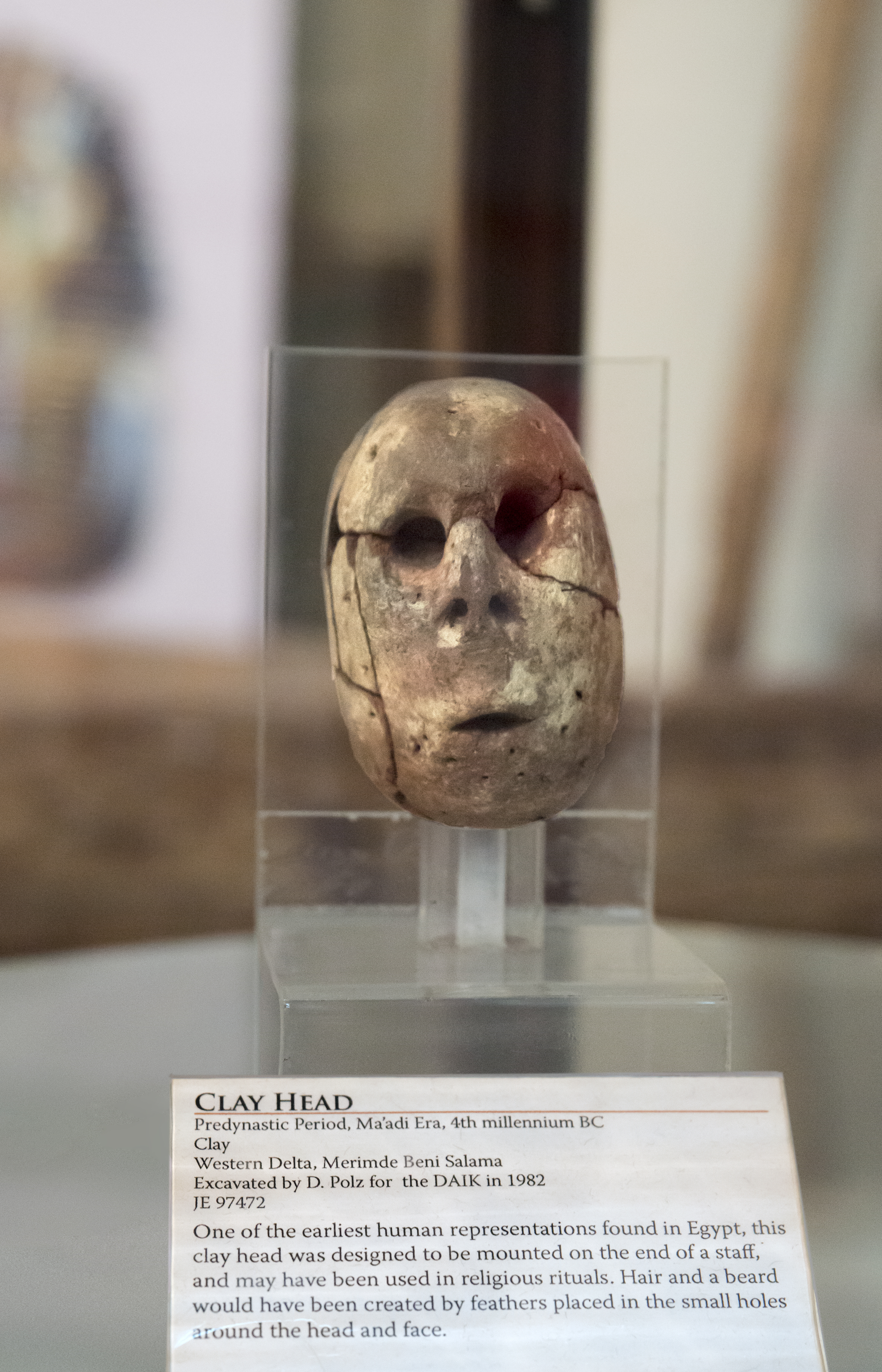
Merimde culture clay head, circa 5,000 BC. This is one of the earliest known representations of a human head in Egypt.

Although archaeological sites reveal very little about this time, an examination of the many Egyptian words for "city" provides a hypothetical list of causes of Egyptian sedentarism. In Upper Egypt, terminology indicates trade, protection of livestock, high ground for flood refuge, and sacred sites for deities.

===== Merimde culture =====
From about 5000 to 4200 BC the Merimde culture, so far only known from Merimde Beni Salama, a large settlement site at the edge of the Western Delta, flourished in Lower Egypt. The culture has strong connections to the Faiyum A culture as well as the Levant. People lived in small huts, produced a simple undecorated pottery and had stone tools. Cattle, sheep, goats and pigs were held. Wheat, sorghum and barley were planted. The Merimde people buried their dead within the settlement and produced clay figurines. The first life-sized Egyptian head made of clay comes from Merimde.

The community at Merimde Beni Salama was primarily sedentary. Archaeological stratification shows that the site had been continuously inhabited for several centuries, with people during that time conducting trade with regions outside of the Nile Valley. The settlement itself was home to several large communal storage pits, and the inhabitants resided in sturdy structures that were constructed with mud slabs. Not much is known about the details surrounding Merimde society, but the site provides little evidence to suggest a pronounced level of socioeconomic differentiation between individuals. Additionally, the culture’s stone tools appear to show a degree of standardization and organization, with the majority of lithics found at the site being classified as bifacially carved core tools.

===== El Omari culture =====
The El Omari culture is known from a small settlement near modern Cairo. People seem to have lived in huts, but only postholes and pits survive. The pottery is undecorated. Stone tools include small flakes, axes and sickles. Metal was not yet known. Their sites were occupied from 4000 BC to the Archaic Period (3,100 BC).

===== Maadi culture =====
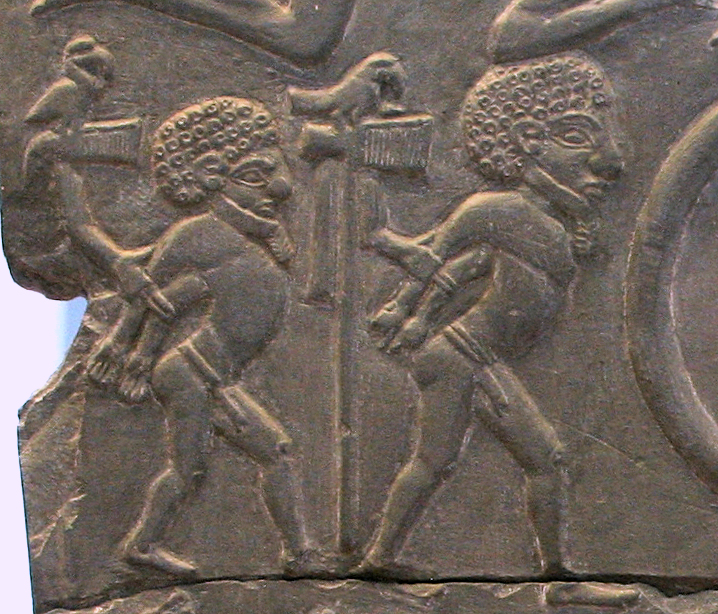
The prisoners on the Battlefield Palette may be the people of the Buto-Maadi culture subjugated by the Egyptian rulers of Naqada III.

The Maadi culture (also called Buto Maadi culture) is the most important Lower Egyptian prehistoric culture dated about 4000–3500 BC, and contemporary with Naqada I and II phases in Upper Egypt. The culture is best known from the site Maadi near Cairo, as well as the site of Buto, but is also attested in many other places in the Delta to the Faiyum region. This culture was marked by development in architecture and technology. It also followed its predecessor cultures when it comes to undecorated ceramics.

Copper was known, and some copper adzes have been found. The pottery is hand-made; it is simple and undecorated. Presence of black-topped red pots indicate contact with the Naqada sites in the south. Many imported vessels from Palestine have also been found. Black basalt stone vessels were also used.

The culture primarily relied on the cultivation of crops such as wheat and barley, as well as herding animals such as cattle, sheep, and pigs. People lived in small huts, partly dug into the ground. The dead were buried in cemeteries, but with few burial goods. The Maadi culture was replaced by the Naqada III culture; whether this happened by conquest or infiltration is still an open question.

The developments in Lower Egypt in the times previous to the unification of the country have been the subject of considerable disputes over the years. The recent excavations at Tell el-Farkha, Sais, and Tell el-Iswid have clarified this picture to some extent. As a result, the Chalcolithic Lower Egyptian culture is now emerging as an important subject of study.

===== Gallery =====
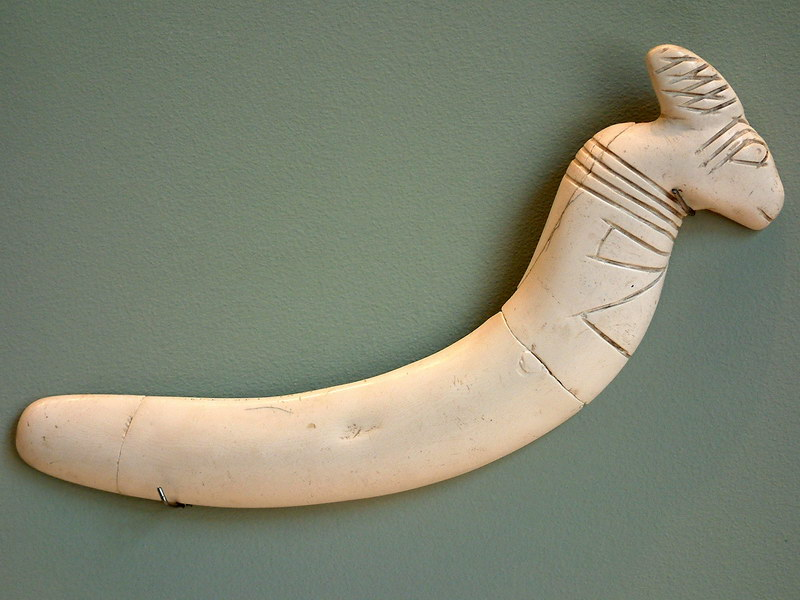
Clapper discovered in Maadi, Louvre Museum

Carved catfish bones, and jar discovered in Maadi

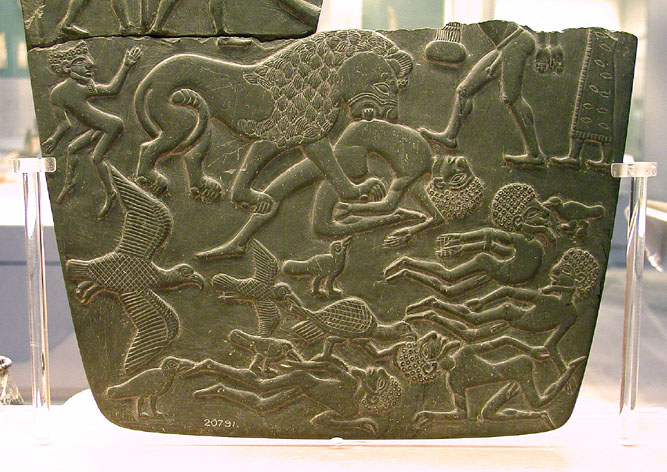
Possible prisoners and wounded men of the Buto-Maadi culture devoured by animals, while one is led by a man in long dress, probably an Egyptian official (fragment, top right corner). Battlefield Palette.

==== Upper Egypt ====
===== Tasian culture =====
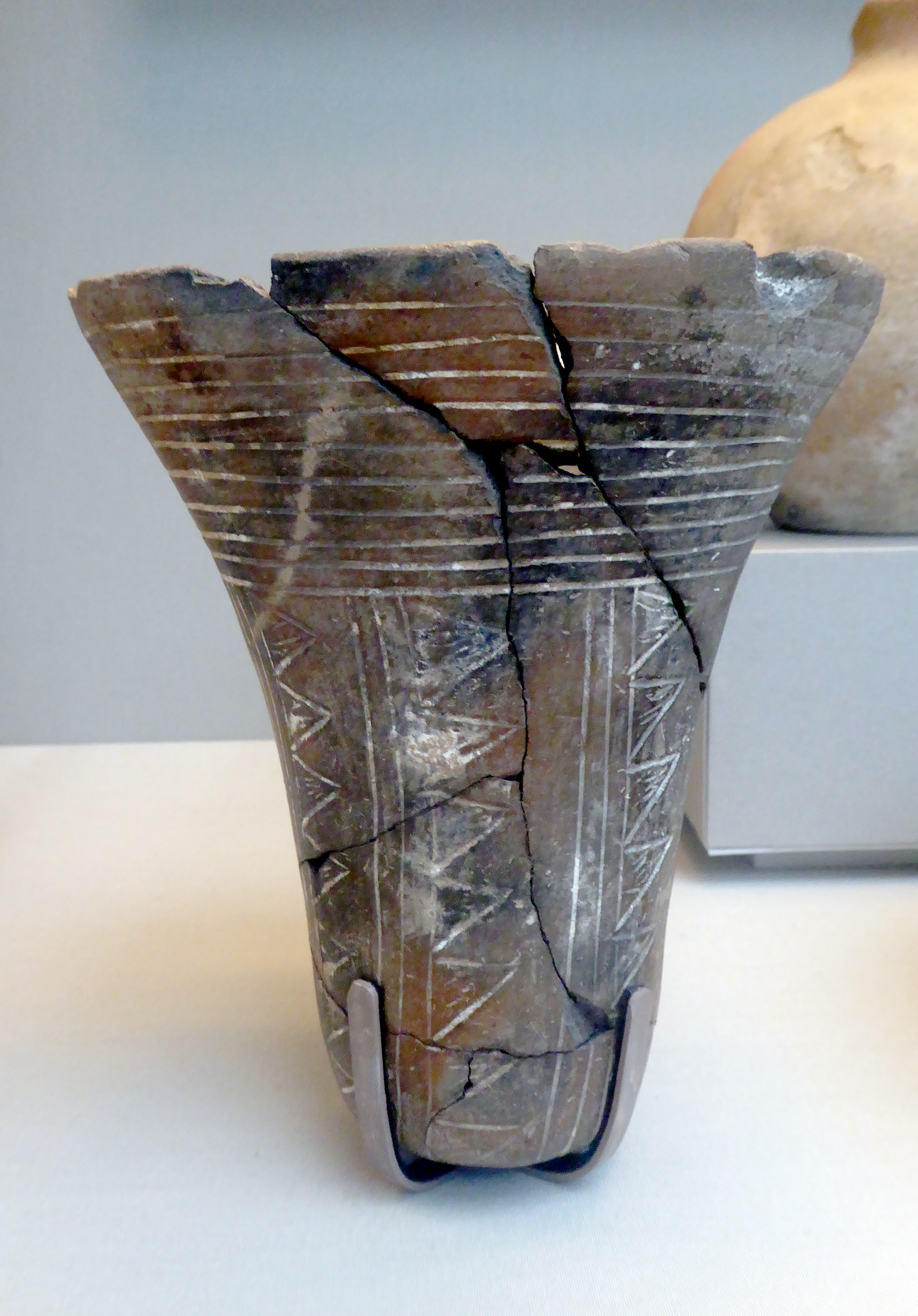
Tasian beaker, found in a Badarian grave at Qau; tomb 569, around 4000 BC; Upper Egypt; British Museum

The Tasian culture appeared around 4500 BC in Upper Egypt. This culture group is named for the burials found at Der Tasa, on the east bank of the Nile between Asyut and Akhmim. It is believed that the Tasian culture primary resided in the desert, and often interacted with other nearby cultures in the Nile Valley, such as the Badarian. The Tasian culture group is notable for producing the earliest blacktop-ware, a type of red and brown pottery that is colored black on the top portion and interior. This pottery is vital to the dating of Predynastic Egypt. Because all dates for the Predynastic period are tenuous at best, WMF Petrie developed a system called sequence dating by which the relative date, if not the absolute date, of any given Predynastic site can be ascertained by examining its pottery.

As the Predynastic period progressed, the handles on pottery evolved from functional to ornamental. The degree to which any given archaeological site has functional or ornamental pottery can also be used to determine the relative date of the site. Since there is little difference between Tasian ceramics and Badarian pottery, the Tasian Culture overlaps the Badarian range significantly. From the Tasian period onward, it appears that Upper Egypt was influenced strongly by the culture of Lower Egypt. Archaeological evidence has suggested that "the Tasian and Badarian Nile Valley sites were a peripheral network of earlier African cultures of around which Badarian, Saharan, Nubian, and Nilotic peoples regularly circulated." Bruce Williams, Egyptologist, has argued that the Tasian culture was significantly related to the Sudanese-Saharan traditions from the Neolithic era which extended from regions north of Khartoum to locations near Dongola in Sudan.

===== Badarian culture =====
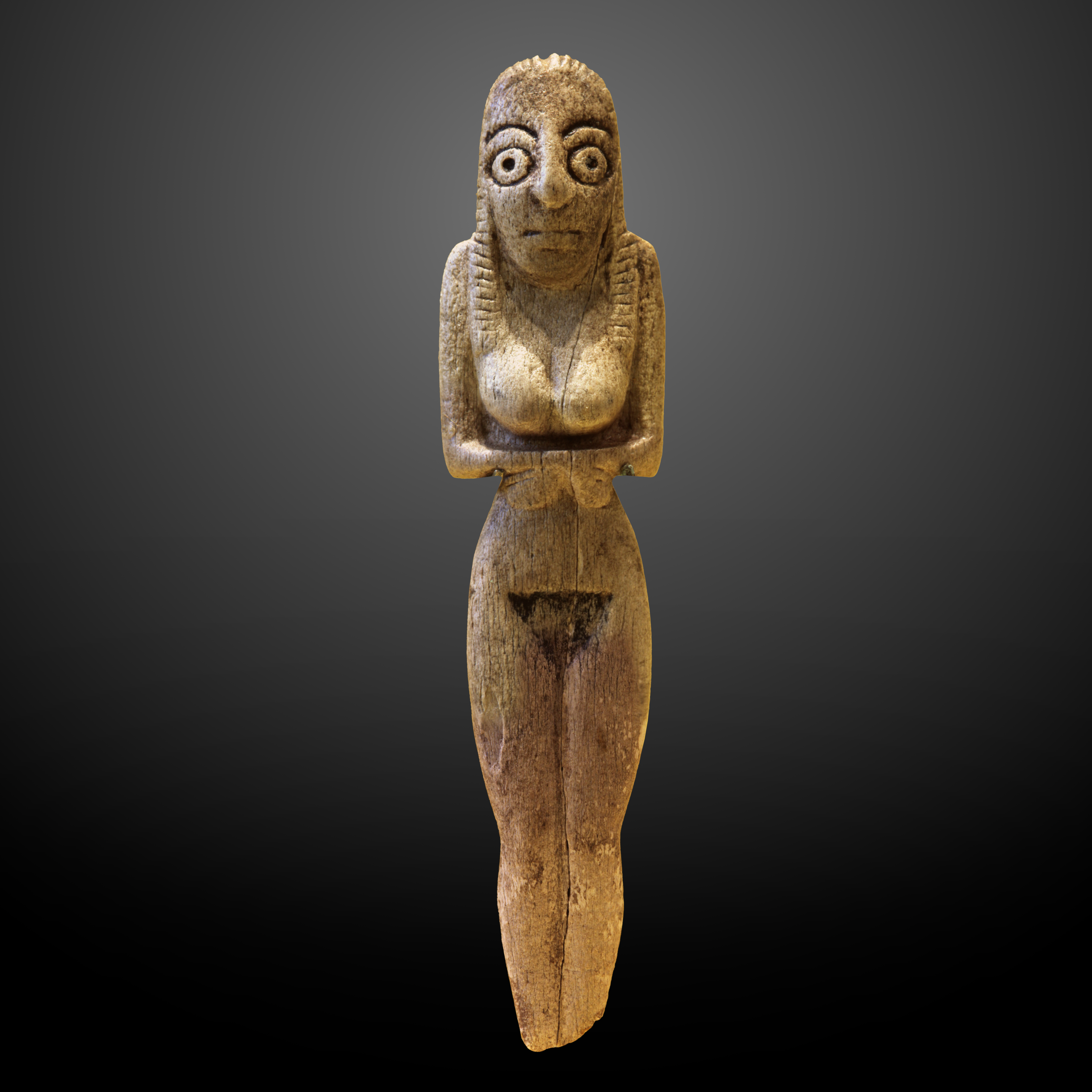
Ancient Badarian mortuary figurine of a woman, held at the Louvre

The Badarian culture, from about 4400 to 4000 BC, is named for the Badari site near Der Tasa. It followed the Tasian culture, but was so similar that many consider them one continuous period. The Badarian Culture continued to produce the kind of pottery called blacktop-ware (albeit much improved in quality) and was assigned Sequence Dating numbers 21–29. The primary difference that prevents scholars from merging the two periods is that Badarian sites use copper in addition to stone and are thus Chalcolithic settlements, while the Neolithic Tasian sites are still considered Stone Age.

Badarian flint tools continued to develop into sharper and more shapely blades, and the first faience was developed. Distinctly Badarian sites have been located from Nekhen to a little north of Abydos. It appears that the Faiyum A culture and the Badarian and Tasian Periods overlapped significantly; however, the Faiyum A culture was considerably less agricultural and was still Neolithic in nature. Many biological anthropological studies have shown strong biological affinities between the Badarians and other Northeast African populations. However, according to Eugene Strouhal and other anthropologists, Predynastic Egyptians like the Badarians were similar to the Capsian culture of North Africa and to Berbers.

In 2005, Keita examined Badarian crania from predynastic upper Egypt in comparison to various European and tropical African crania. He found that the predynastic Badarian series clustered much closer with the tropical African series. Although, no Asian or other North African samples were included in the study as the comparative series were selected based on "Brace et al.'s (1993) comments on the affinities of an upper Egyptian/Nubian epipaleolithic series". Keita further noted that additional analysis and material from Sudan, late dynastic northern Egypt (Gizeh), Somalia, Asia and the Pacific Islands "show the Badarian series to be most similar to a series from the northeast quadrant of Africa and then to other Africans".

Dental trait analysis of Badarian fossils conducted in a thesis study found that they were closely related to both Afroasiatic-speaking populations inhabiting Northeast Africa, as well as the Maghreb. Among the ancient populations, the Badarians were nearest to other ancient Egyptians (Naqada, Hierakonpolis, Abydos and Kharga in Upper Egypt; Hawara in Lower Egypt), and C-Group and Pharaonic era skeletons excavated in Lower Nubia, followed by the A-Group culture bearers of Lower Nubia, the Kerma and Kush populations in Upper Nubia, the Meroitic, X-Group and Christian period inhabitants of Lower Nubia, and the Kellis population in the Dakhla Oasis. Among the recent groups, the Badari markers were morphologically closest to the Shawia and Kabyle Berber populations of Algeria as well as Bedouin groups in Morocco, Libya and Tunisia, followed by other Afroasiatic-speaking populations in the Horn of Africa.

=== Chalcolithic (c. 4000-3000 BC) ===
==== Naqada culture ====
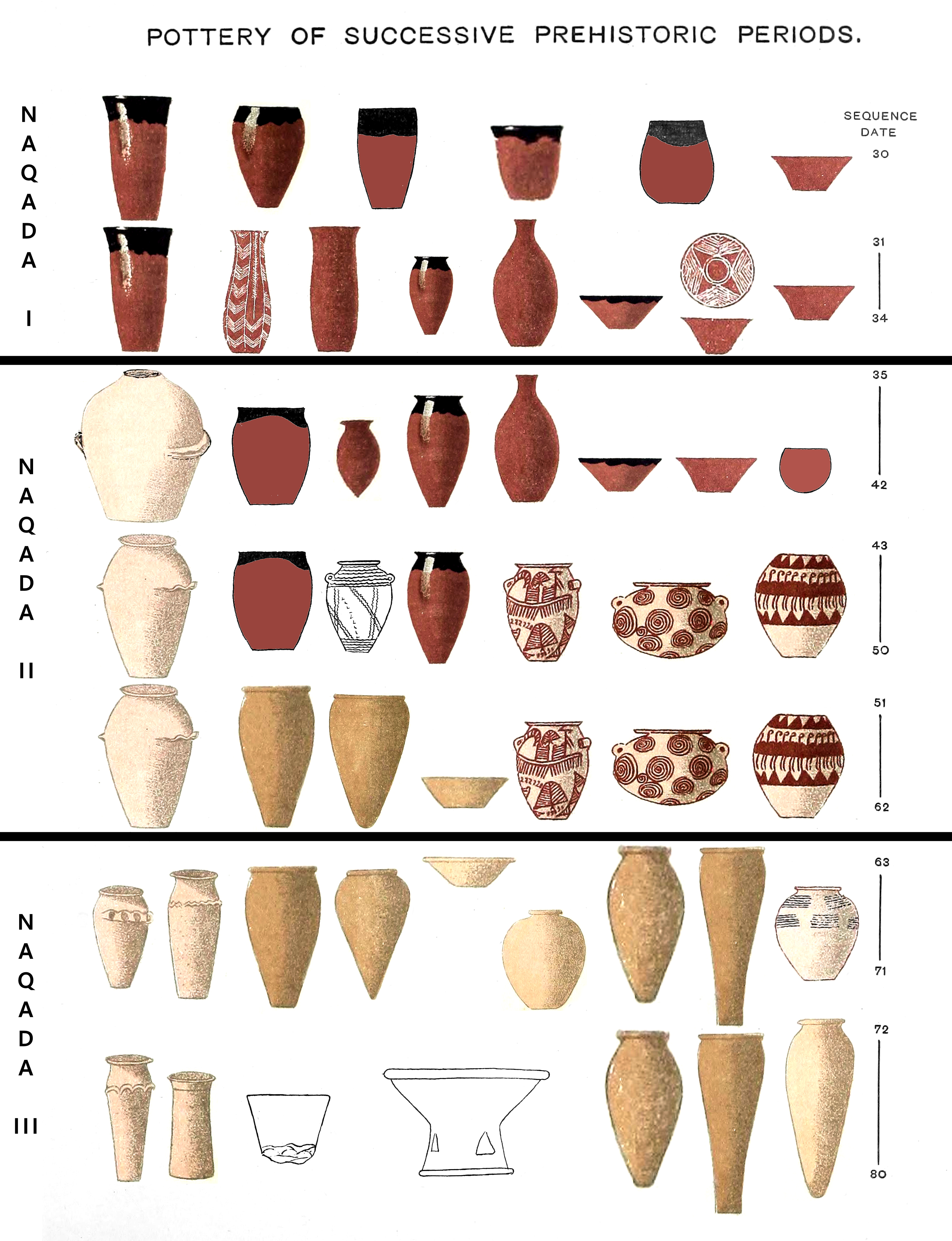
Evolution of Egyptian prehistoric pottery styles, from Naqada I to Naqada II and Naqada III

The Naqada culture is an archaeological culture of Chalcolithic Predynastic Egypt (c. 4000–3000 BC), named for the town of Naqada, Qena Governorate. It is divided in three sub-periods: Naqada I, II and III.

Similar to the preceding Badarian culture, studies have found Naqada skeletal remains to have Northeast African affinities. A study by Dr. Shormaka Keita found that Naqada remains were conforming almost equally to two local types, a southern Egyptian pattern (which shares closest resemblance with Kerma), and a northern Egyptian pattern (most similar to Coastal Maghreb).

In 1996, Lovell and Prowse also reported the presence of individuals buried at Naqada in what they interpreted to be elite, high status tombs, showing them to be an endogamous ruling or elite segment of the local population at Naqada, which is more closely related to populations in northern Nubia (A-Group) than to neighbouring populations in southern Egypt. Specifically, they stated the Naqda samples were "more similar to the Lower Nubian protodynastic sample than they are to the geographically more proximate southern Egyptian samples" in Qena and Badari. However, they found the skeletal samples from the Naqada cemeteries to be significantly different to protodynastic populations in northern Nubia and predynastic Egyptian samples from Badari and Qena, which were also significantly different to northern Nubian populations. Overall, both the elite and nonelite individuals in the Naqada cemeteries were more similar to each other than they were to the samples in northern Nubia or to samples from Badari and Qena in southern Egypt.

In 2023, Christopher Ehret reported that the physical anthropological findings from the "major burial sites of those founding locales of ancient Egypt in the fourth millennium BCE, notably El-Badari as well as Naqada, show no demographic indebtedness to the Levant". Ehret specified that these studies revealed cranial and dental affinities with "closest parallels" to other longtime populations in the surrounding areas of northeastern Africa "such as Nubia and the northern Horn of Africa". He further commented that "members of this population did not come from somewhere else but were descendants of the long-term inhabitants of these portions of Africa going back many millennia". Ehret also cited existing, archaeological, linguistic and genetic data which he argued supported the demographic history.

===== Naqada I (Amratian culture) =====
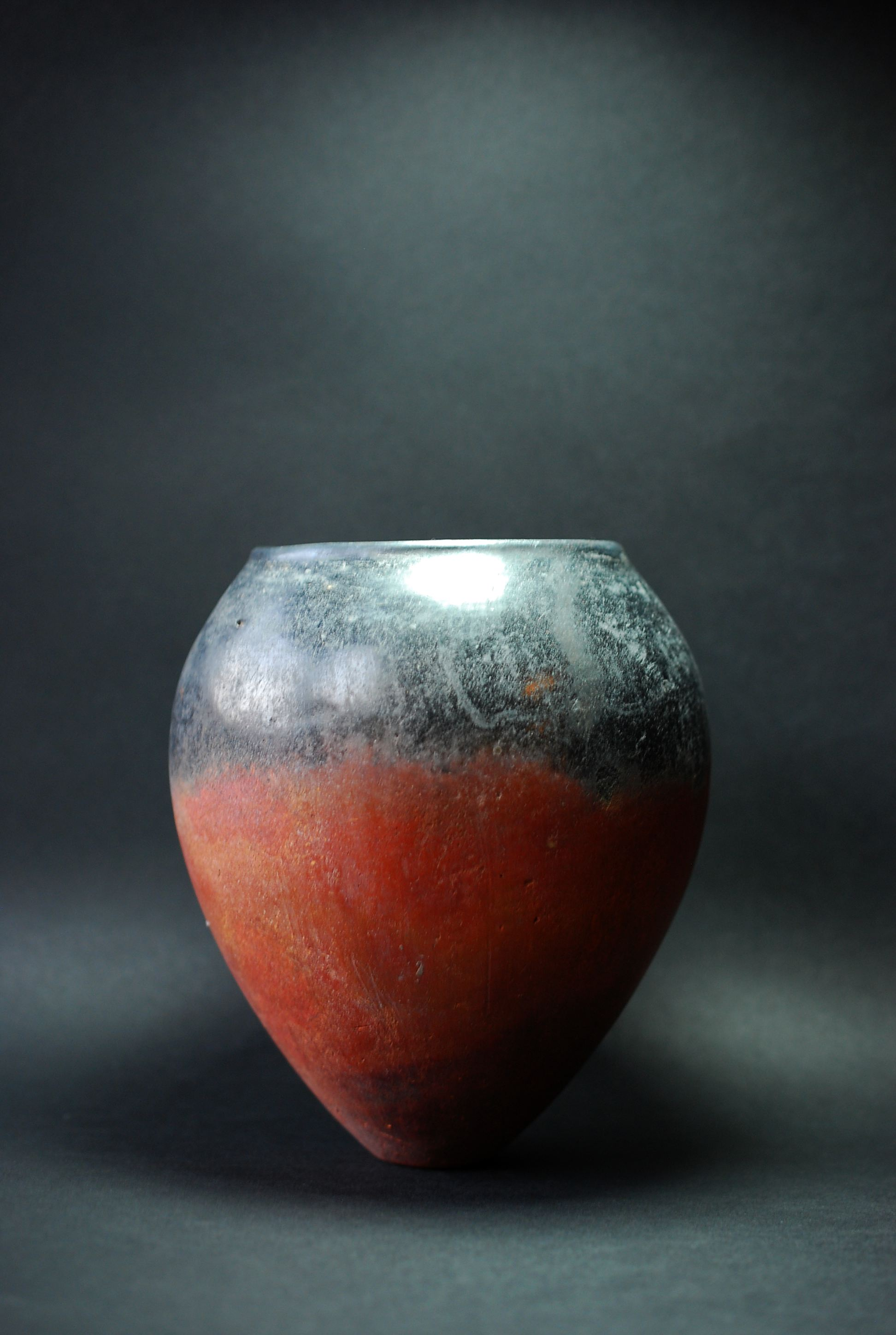
Ovoid Naqada I (Amratian) black-topped terracotta vase, (c. 3800–3500 BC).

The Amratian culture lasted from about 4000 to 3500 BC. It is named after the site of El-Amra, about 120 km south of Badari. El-Amra is the first site where this culture group was found unmingled with the later Gerzean culture group, but this period is better attested at the Naqada site, so it also is referred to as the Naqada I culture. Black-topped ware continues to appear, but white cross-line ware, a type of pottery which has been decorated with close parallel white lines being crossed by another set of close parallel white lines, is also found at this time. The Amratian period falls between S.D. 30 and 39 in Petrie's Sequence Dating system.

Newly excavated objects attest to increased trade between Upper and Lower Egypt at this time. A stone vase from the north was found at el-Amra, and copper, which is not mined in Egypt, was imported from the Sinai, or possibly Nubia. Obsidian and a small amount of gold were both definitely imported from Nubia. Trade with the oases also was likely.

New innovations appeared in Amratian settlements as precursors to later cultural periods. For example, the mud-brick buildings for which the Gerzean period is known were first seen in Amratian times, but only in small numbers. Additionally, oval and theriomorphic cosmetic palettes appear in this period, but the workmanship is very rudimentary and the relief artwork for which they were later known is not yet present.

Later Amratian pottery and artwork often depicts various plants and animals. Pieces featuring fish, birds, elephants, crocodiles, and other animals have all been dated to the late Amratian. One small bowl depicts a man standing on a boat or raft while he appears to hunt a hippopotamus with a harpoon. The human figure is also commonly depicted on Amratian vessels. Jar E3002 in the Brussels Art & History Museum shows a group of eight men, two of which are wearing feathers and animal tails, while holding their arms above their heads. Additionally, bowl UC9547 in the Petrie Museum of Egyptian Archaeology shows two men in a weaving scene, providing early evidence for textile production in Egypt.

===== Naqada II (Gerzean culture) =====
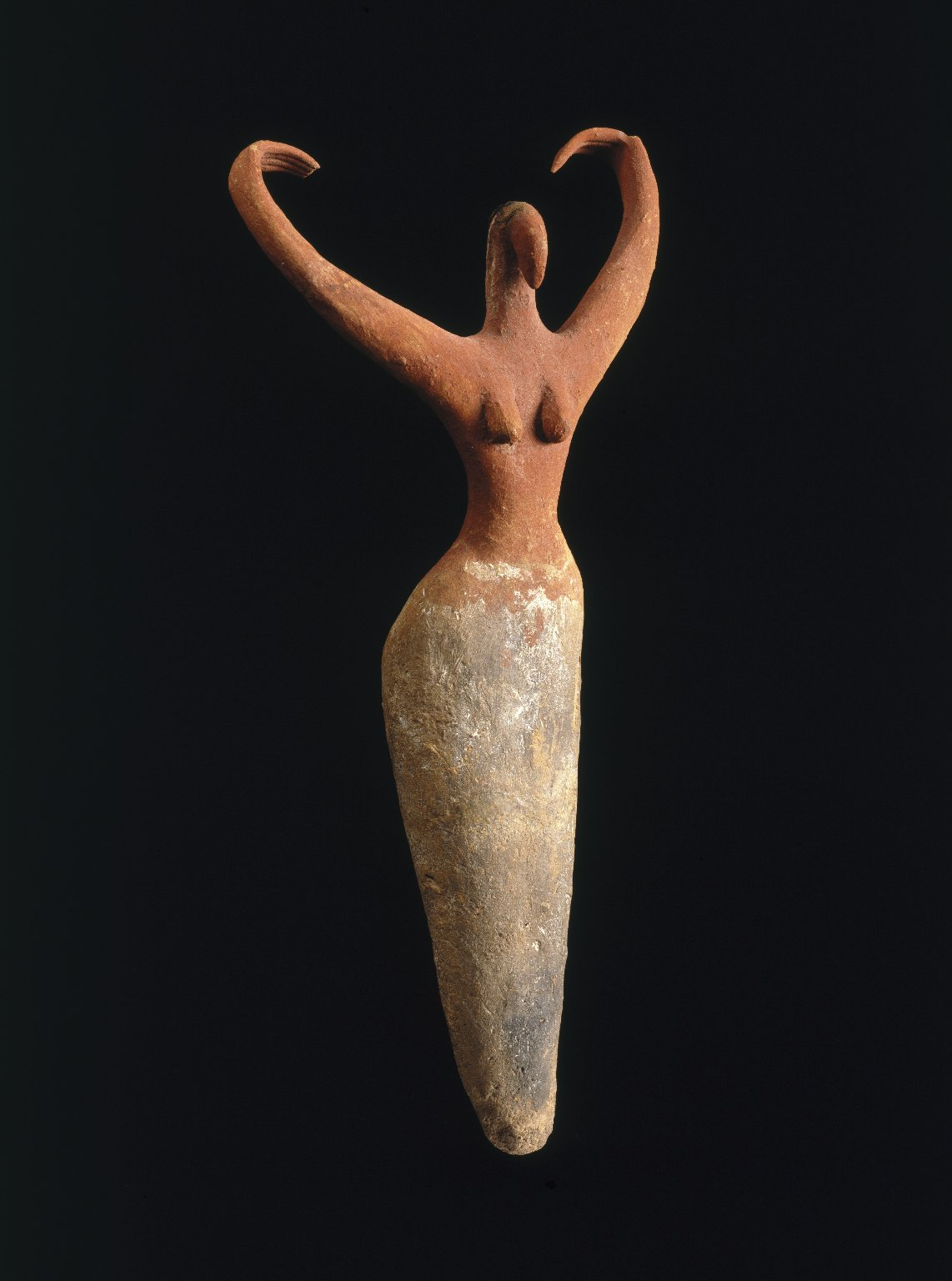
Naqada figure of a woman interpreted to represent the goddess Bat with her inward curving horns. Another hypothesis is that the raised arms symbolize wings and that the figure is an early version of the white vulture goddess Nekhbet, c. 3500–3400 B.C.E. terracotta, painted, 11 1/2 in × 5 1/2 in × 2 1/4 in (29.2 cm × 14.0 cm × 5.7 cm), Brooklyn Museum

The Gerzean culture, from about 3500 to 3200 BC, is named after the site of Gerzeh. It was the next stage in Egyptian cultural development, and it was during this time that the foundation of Dynastic Egypt was laid. Gerzean culture is largely an unbroken development out of Amratian Culture, starting in the delta and moving south through upper Egypt, but failing to dislodge Amratian culture in Nubia. Gerzean pottery is assigned values from S.D. 40 through 62, and is distinctly different from Amratian white cross-lined wares or black-topped ware. Gerzean pottery was painted mostly in dark red with pictures of animals, people, and ships, as well as geometric symbols that appear derived from animals. Also, "wavy" handles, rare before this period (though occasionally found as early as S.D. 35) became more common and more elaborate until they were almost completely ornamental.

Gerzean culture coincided with a significant decline in rainfall, and farming along the Nile now produced the vast majority of food, though contemporary paintings indicate that hunting was not entirely forgone. With increased food supplies, Egyptians adopted a much more sedentary lifestyle and cities grew as large as 5,000.

It was in this time that Egyptian city dwellers stopped building with reeds and began mass-producing mud bricks, first found in the Amratian Period, to build their cities.

Egyptian stone tools, while still in use, moved from bifacial construction to ripple-flaked construction. Copper was used for all kinds of tools, and the first copper weaponry appears here. Silver, gold, lapis, and faience were used ornamentally, and the grinding palettes used for eye-paint since the Badarian period began to be adorned with relief carvings.

Gebel el-Arak knife (3450-3400 BC)

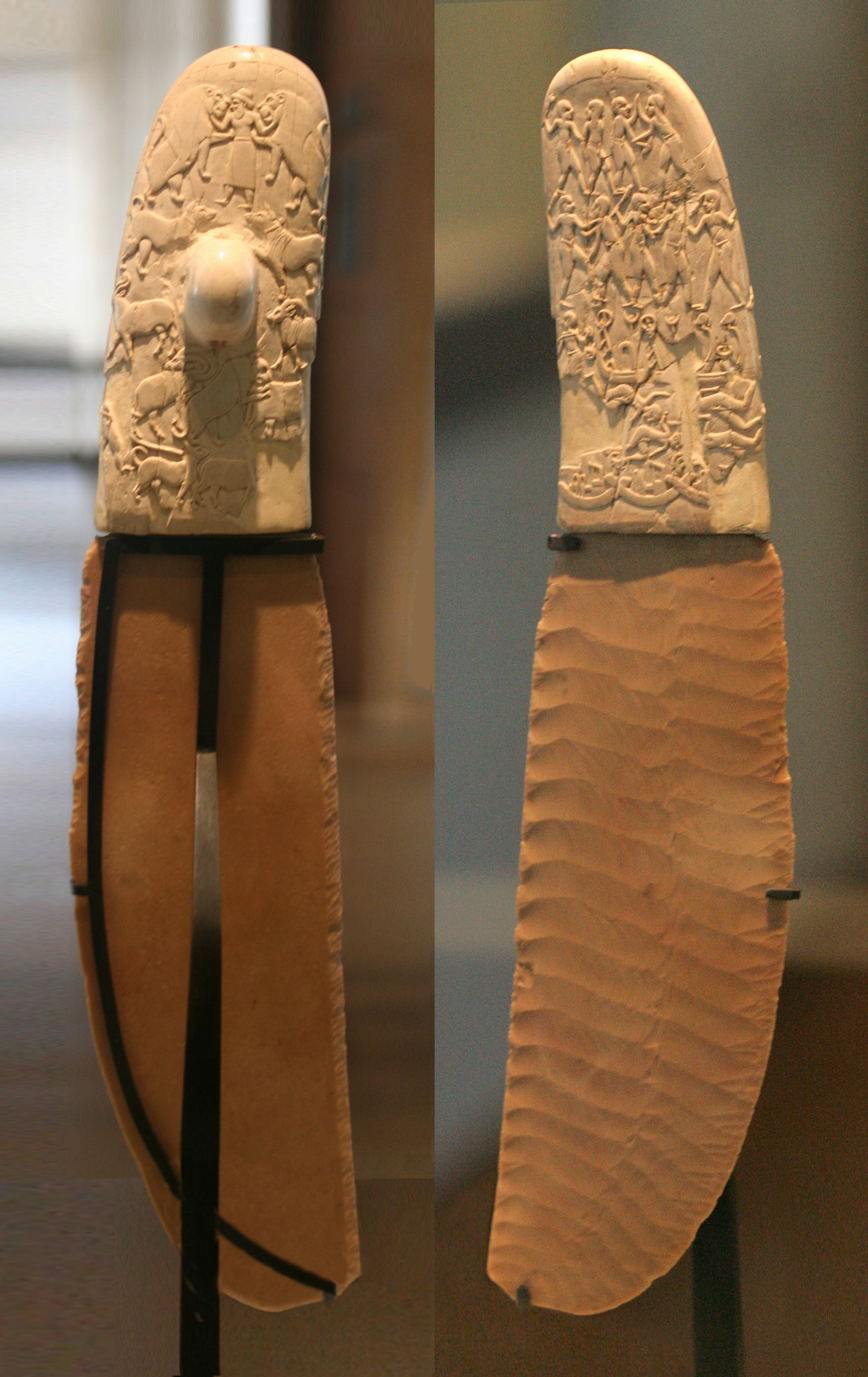
Egyptian prehistoric Gebel el-Arak Knife, Abydos, Egypt. Louvre Museum.

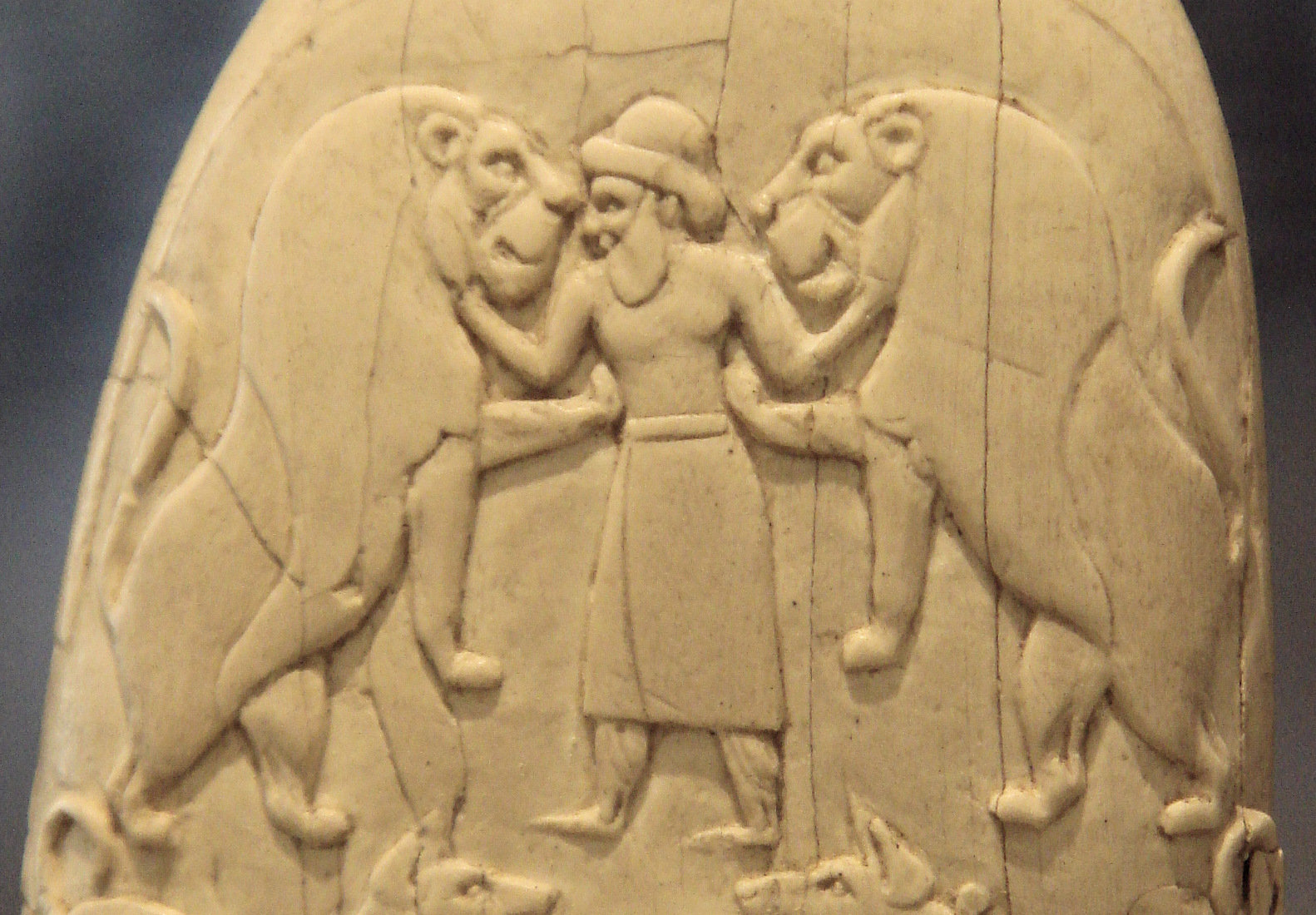
Mesopotamian king as Master of Animals on the Gebel el-Arak Knife. This work of art both shows the influence of Mesopotamia on Egypt at an early date, during a period of Egypt-Mesopotamia relations, and the state of Mesopotamian royal iconography during the Uruk period.

The first tombs in classic Egyptian style were also built, modeled after ordinary houses and sometimes composed of multiple rooms. Although further excavations in the Delta are needed, this style is generally believed to originate there and not in Upper Egypt.

Although the Gerzean Culture is now clearly identified as being the continuation of the Amratian period, significant Mesopotamian influence worked its way into Egypt during the Gerzean, interpreted in previous years as evidence of a Mesopotamian ruling class, the so-called dynastic race, coming to power over Upper Egypt. This idea no longer attracts academic support.

Distinctly foreign objects and art forms entered Egypt during this period, indicating contacts with several parts of Asia. Objects such as the Gebel el-Arak knife handle, which has patently Mesopotamian relief carvings on it, have been found in Egypt, and the silver which appears in this period can only have been obtained from Asia Minor.

In addition, Egyptian objects are created which clearly mimic Mesopotamian forms, although not slavishly. Cylinder seals appear in Egypt, as well as recessed paneling architecture, the Egyptian reliefs on cosmetic palettes are clearly made in the same style as the contemporary Mesopotamian Uruk culture, and the ceremonial mace heads which turn up from the late Gerzean and early Semainean are crafted in the Mesopotamian "pear-shaped" style, instead of the Egyptian native style.

The route of this trade is difficult to determine, but contact with Canaan does not predate the early dynastic, so it is usually assumed to have been conducted over water. During the time when the Dynastic Race Theory was still popular, it was theorized that Uruk sailors circumnavigated Arabia, but a Mediterranean route, probably by middlemen through Byblos, is more likely, as evidenced by the presence of Byblian objects in Egypt.

The fact that so many Gerzean sites are at the mouths of wadis that lead to the Red Sea may indicate some amount of trade via the Red Sea (though Byblian trade potentially could have crossed the Sinai and then taken the Red Sea). Also, it is considered unlikely that something so complicated as recessed panel architecture could have worked its way into Egypt by proxy, and at least a small contingent of migrants is often suspected.

Despite this evidence of foreign influence, Egyptologists generally agree that the Gerzean Culture is still predominantly indigenous to Egypt.

===== Naqada III (Protodynastic Period) =====
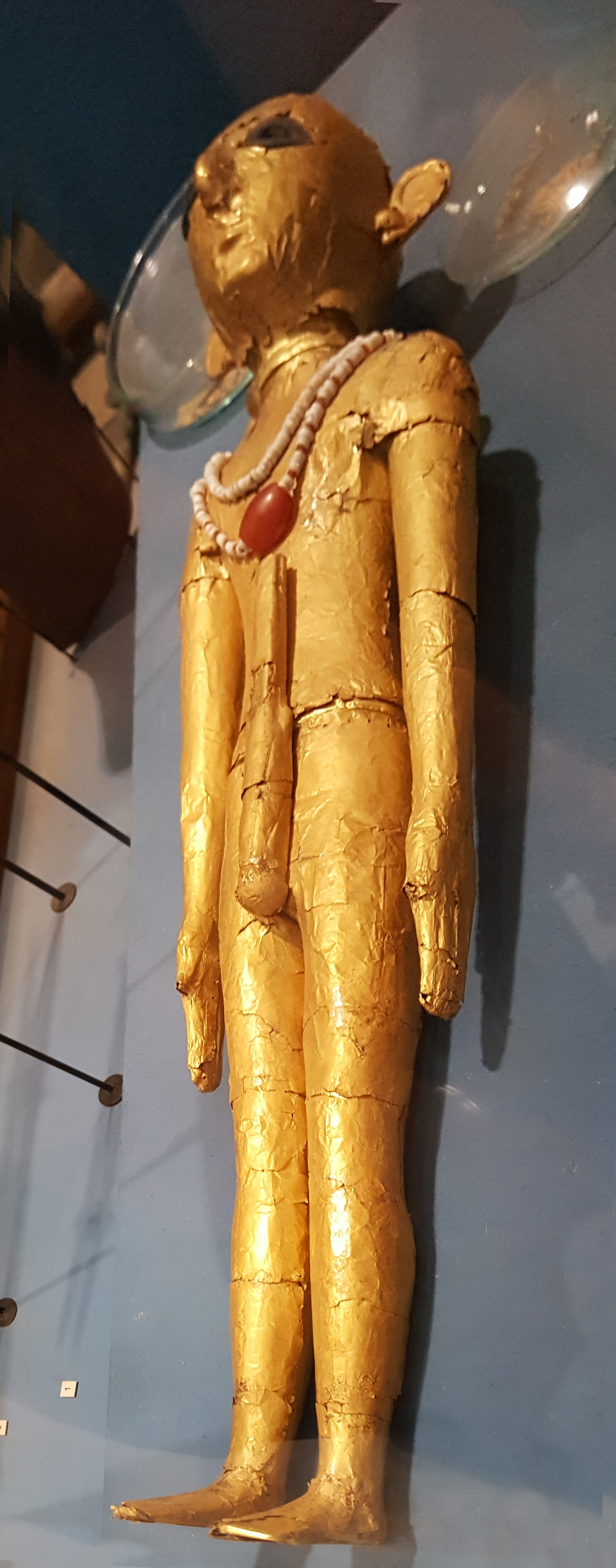
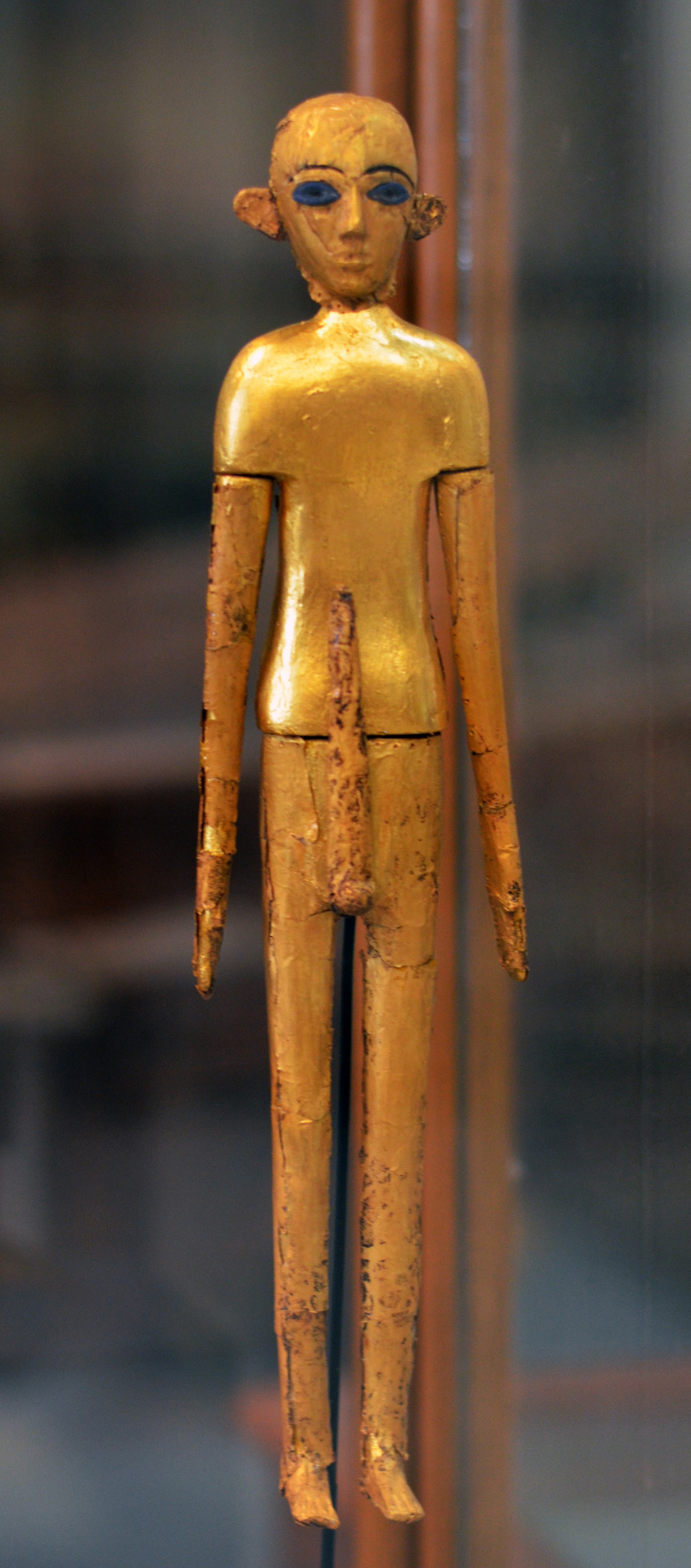
Oldest known representations of ancient Egyptian rulers, from Tell el-Farkha (60 cm father left, 30cm son right). Late Predynastic period (Naqada III b, c. 3200–3000 BC). Egyptian Museum (Cairo).

The Naqada III period, from about 3200 to 3000 BC, is generally taken to be identical with the Protodynastic period, during which Egypt was unified.

Naqada III is notable for being the first era with hieroglyphs (though this is disputed by some), the first regular use of serekhs, the first irrigation, and the first appearance of royal cemeteries.

The relatively affluent Maadi suburb of Cairo is built over the original Naqada stronghold.

Bioarchaeologist Nancy Lovell had stated that there is a sufficient body of morphological evidence to indicate that ancient southern Egyptians had physical characteristics "within the range of variation" of both ancient and modern indigenous peoples in the Sahara and tropical Africa. She summarised that "In general, the inhabitants of Upper Egypt and Nubia had the greatest biological affinity to people of the Sahara and more southerly areas", but exhibited local variation in an African context.

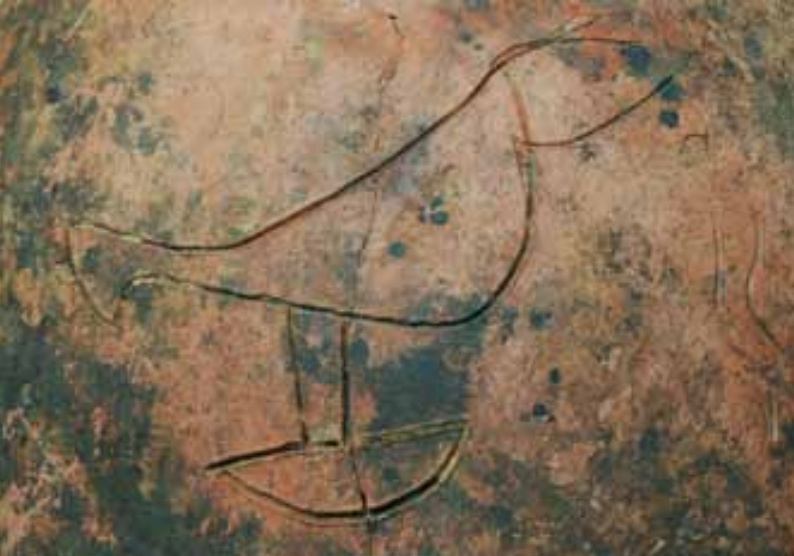
Name of King Iry-Hor, Dynasty 0, Eastern Kom, Tell el-Farkha.

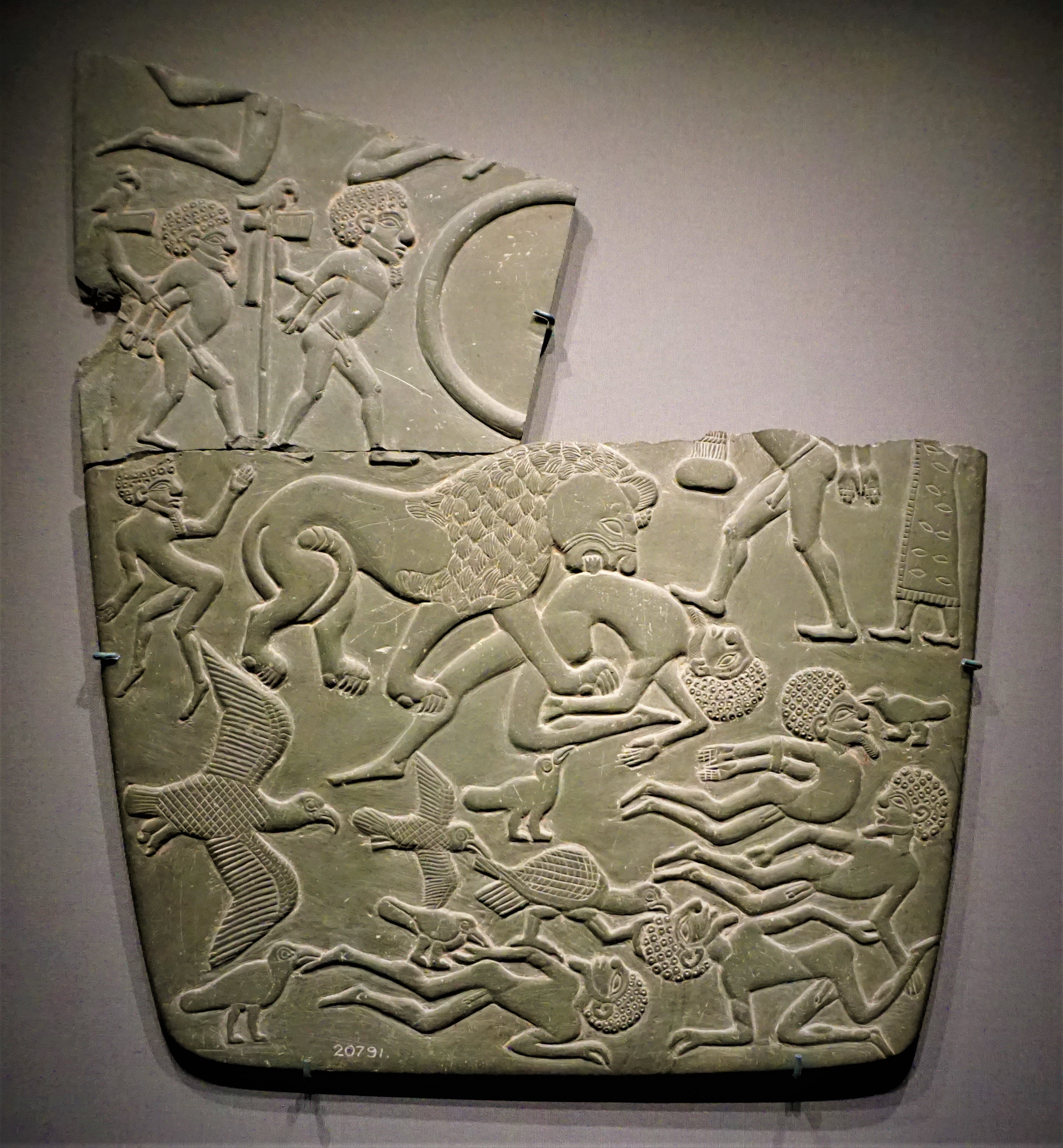
The Battlefield Palette, possibly showing the subjection of the people of the Buto-Maadi culture, by the Egyptian rulers of Naqada III, circa 3100 BC.

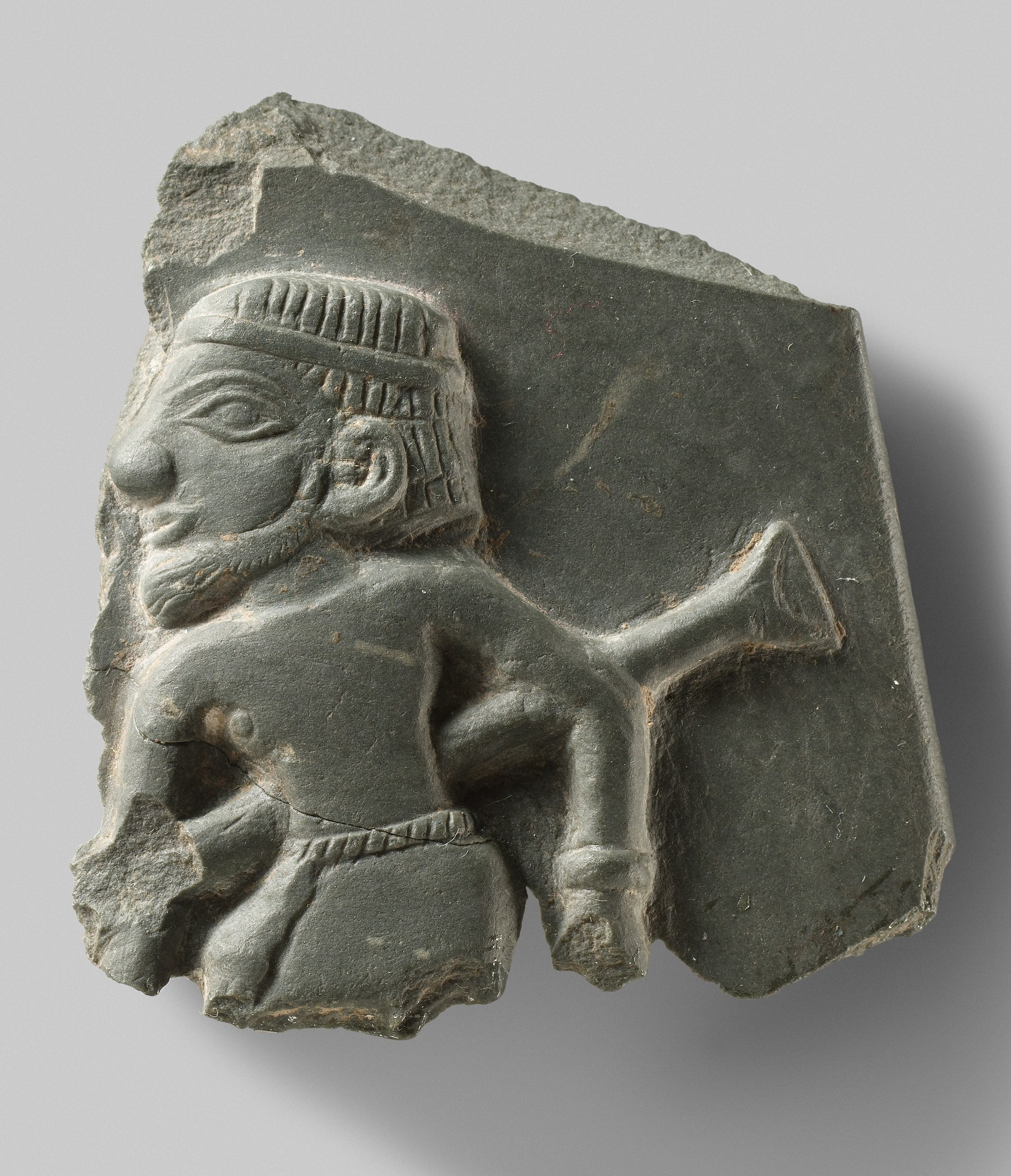
Fragment of a ceremonial palette illustrating a man and a type of staff. Circa 3200–3100 BC, Predynastic, Late Naqada III.

===== Genetics at the end of the Neolithic period =====
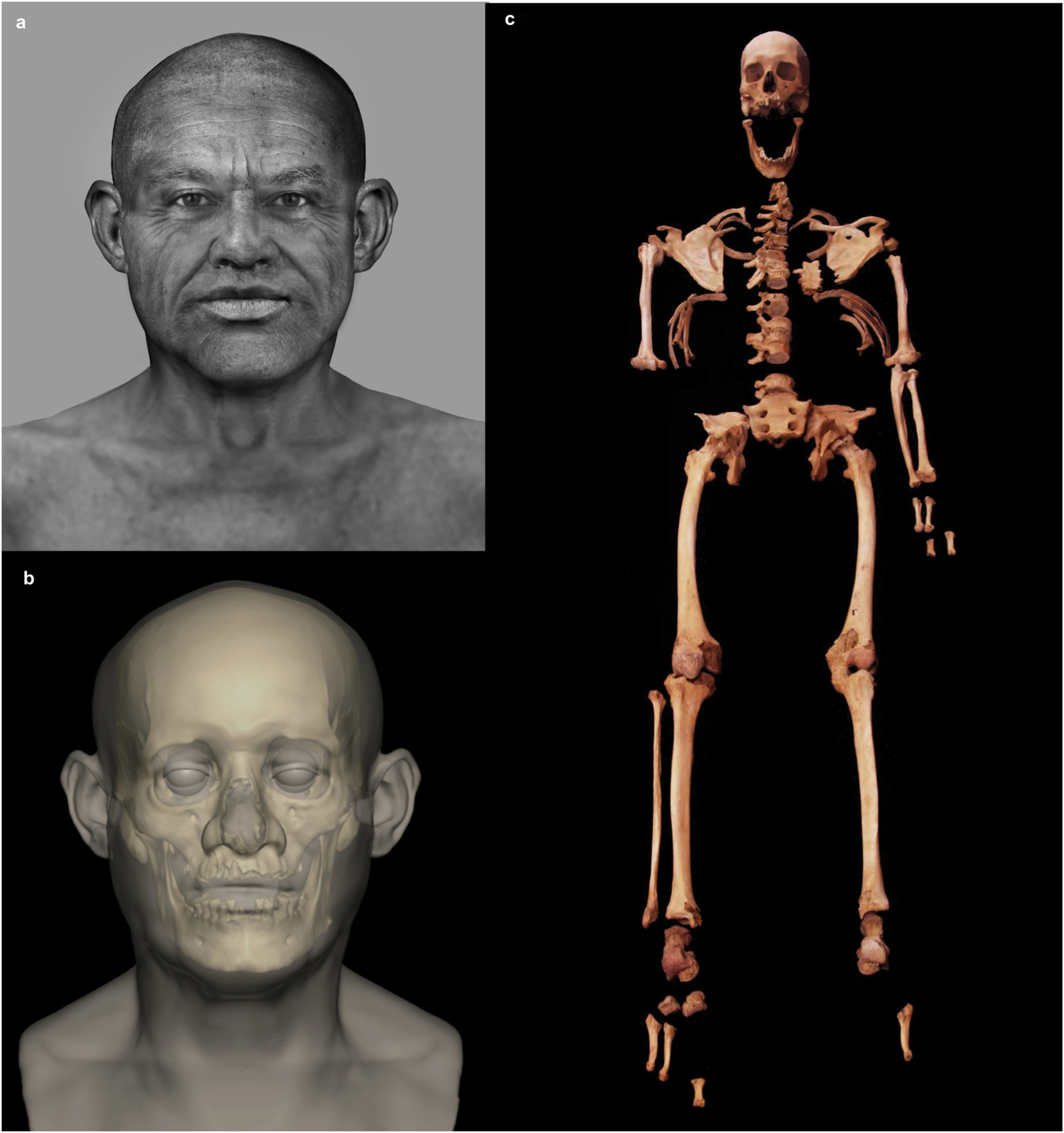
Facial reconstruction and depiction created from the Nuwayrat Early Dynastic individual, carbon dated to 2855–2570 BCE, soon after the end of the Neolithic period.

For the first time in 2025, a study was able to give insights into the genetic background of Early Dynastic Egyptians, by sequencing the whole genome of an Old Kingdom adult male Egyptian of relatively high-status, radiocarbon-dated to 2855–2570 BCE, which was excavated in Nuwayrat (Nuerat, نويرات), in a cliff 265 km south of Cairo. Before this study, whole-genome sequencing of ancient Egyptians from the early periods of Egyptian Dynastic history had not yet been accomplished, mainly because of the problematic DNA preservation conditions in Egypt.

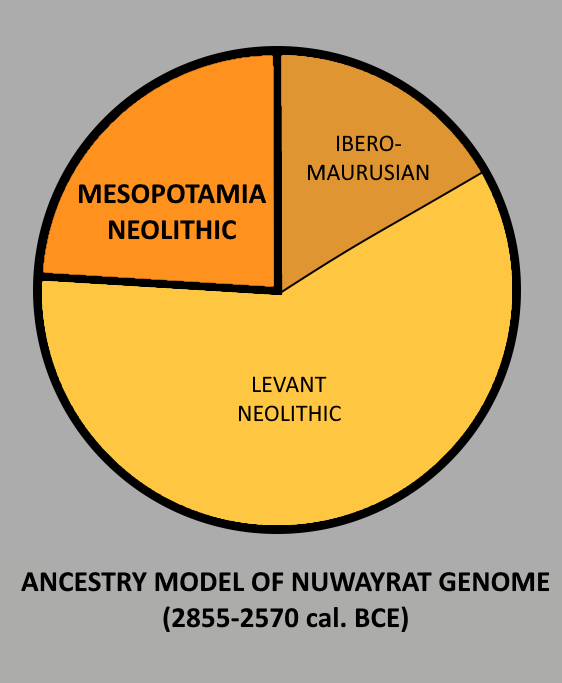
Ancestry model of 3rd millennium Egyptian genome from Nuwayrat.

The corpse had been placed intact in a large circular clay pot without embalming, and then installed inside a cliff tomb, which accounts for the comparatively good level of conservation of the skeleton and its DNA. Most of his genome was found to be associated with North African Neolithic ancestry, but about 20% of his genetic ancestry could be sourced to the eastern Fertile Crescent, including Mesopotamia. The genetic profile was most closely represented by a two-source model, in which 77.6% ± 3.8% of the ancestry corresponded to genomes from the Middle Neolithic Moroccan site of Skhirat-Rouazi (dated to 4780–4230 BCE), which itself consists of predominantly (76.4 ± 4.0%) Levant Neolithic ancestry and (23.6 ± 4.0%) minor Iberomaurusian ancestry, while the remainder (22.4% ± 3.8%) was most closely related to known genomes from Neolithic Mesopotamia (dated to 9000-8000 BCE). Genomes from the Neolithic/Chalcolithic Levant only appeared as a minor third-place component in three-source models. A 2022 DNA study had already shown evidence of gene flow from the Mesopotamian and Zagros regions into surrounding areas, including Anatolia, during the Neolithic, but not as far as Egypt yet.

Overall, the 2025 study "provides direct evidence of genetic ancestry related to the eastern Fertile Crescent in ancient Egypt". This genetic connection suggests that there had been ancient migration flows from the eastern Fertile Crescent to Egypt, in addition to the exchanges of objects and imagery (domesticated animals and plants, writing systems...) already observed. This suggests a pattern of wide cultural and demographic expansion from the Mesopotamian region, which affected both Anatolia and Egypt during this period.

The Mesopotamian ancestors of the Nuwayrat individual may have migrated to Egypt during the Neolithic period, or may have arrived in a recent period through a yet unknown migration through the Near-East, or alternatively through direct sea-routes in the Mediterranean or the Red Sea.

The authors acknowledged limitations of the 2025 study, such as their reliance on a single Egyptian genome for analysis, and known limitations in predicting the above-referenced phenotypic traits in understudied populations. Analyses excluded any substantial ancestry in the Nuwayrat genome related to a previously published 4,500-year-old hunter-gatherer genome from the Mota cave in Ethiopia, or other individuals in central, eastern, or southern Africa.

Regarding the supplement facial reconstruction, the researchers noted that while the DNA analysis is indicative of population origin, there was no physical evidence of any particular skin colour, eye colour, or hair colour, and therefore, the reconstruction was produced in black and white without head hair or facial hair.

===== International Scholarship =====
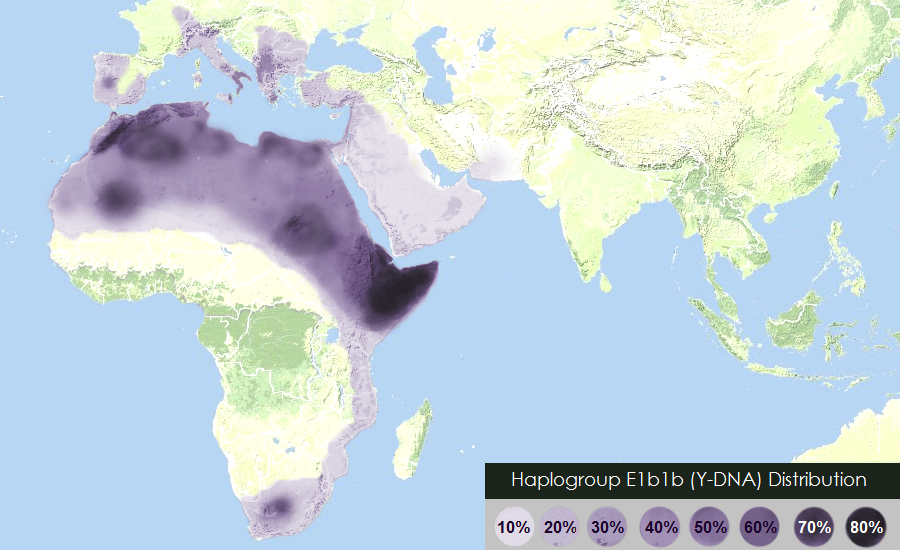
E1b1b is a common paternal haplogroup across much of Africa, including Egypt. "Haplogroup E is defined by the M96 SNP (and others), for which a cautious reading of all of the evidence would indicate an eastern tropical African origin (Cruciani, 2007; Gomes et al., 2010; Trombetta et al., 2015)".

In 2025, the UNESCO International Scientific Committee published a review of their 1974 Symposium which discussed the Peopling of Ancient Egypt and featured multidisciplinary views on the population formation of Egypt. UNESCO International Scientific Committee Chair Augustin Holl stated that Egypt was situated in an intersection between Africa and Eurasia but affirmed "Egypt is African" with "a fluctuating distribution of African and Eurasian populations depending on historical circumstances".

According to anthropologist Alain Anselin, reviewer of the 1974 symposium, the weight of recent evidence had repositioned Upper Egypt as the origin centre for pharaonic unification and the "migration of peoples of the Sahara and groups from the South to the valley - something confirmed by research over the last thirty years". Anselin referenced a range of specialist studies (anthropology, linguistics, population genetics and archaeology) presented at a triennial conference in 2005 which he stated was a continuation of the 1974 recommendations. This included a genetic study which quantified the "key impact" of Sub-Saharan populations and showed that the early pre-dynastic population of the Berber people of the Siwa Oasis in north-western Egypt had close demographic links with people of North-East Africa. He further described the value of other studies such as a Crubezy study which "traced the boundaries of the ancient Khoisan settlement to Upper Egypt, where its faint traces remain identifiable and Keita’s work, as the most groundbreaking", and that Cerny's team had identified close genetic and linguistic links between the peoples of Upper Egypt, North Cameroon (some of whom spoke Chadic languages) and Ethiopia (some of whom spoke Kushitic languages). Genetic analysis of a modern Upper Egyptian population had "confirmed the presence of ancient DNA related to current sub-Saharan populations", with 71% of the sampled cases carrying E1b1 haplogroup and 3% carrying the L0f mitochondrial haplogroup. A secondary review published in 2025 noted the results were preliminary and need to be confirmed by other laboratories with new sequencing methods. The genetic marker E1b1 was identified to have wide distribution across Egypt, with "P2/215/M35.1 (E1b1b), for short M35, likely also originated in eastern tropical Africa, and is predominantly distributed in an arc from the Horn of Africa up through Egypt".

Mainstream scholars have situated the ethnicity and the origins of predynastic, southern Egypt as a foundational community primarily in northeast Africa which included the Sudan, tropical Africa and the Sahara whilst recognising the population variability that became characteristic of the pharaonic period. Pharaonic Egypt featured a physical gradation across the regional populations, with Upper Egyptians having shared more biological affinities with Sudanese and southernly African populations, whereas Lower Egyptians had closer genetic links with Levantine and Mediterranean populations.

== Lower Nubia ==
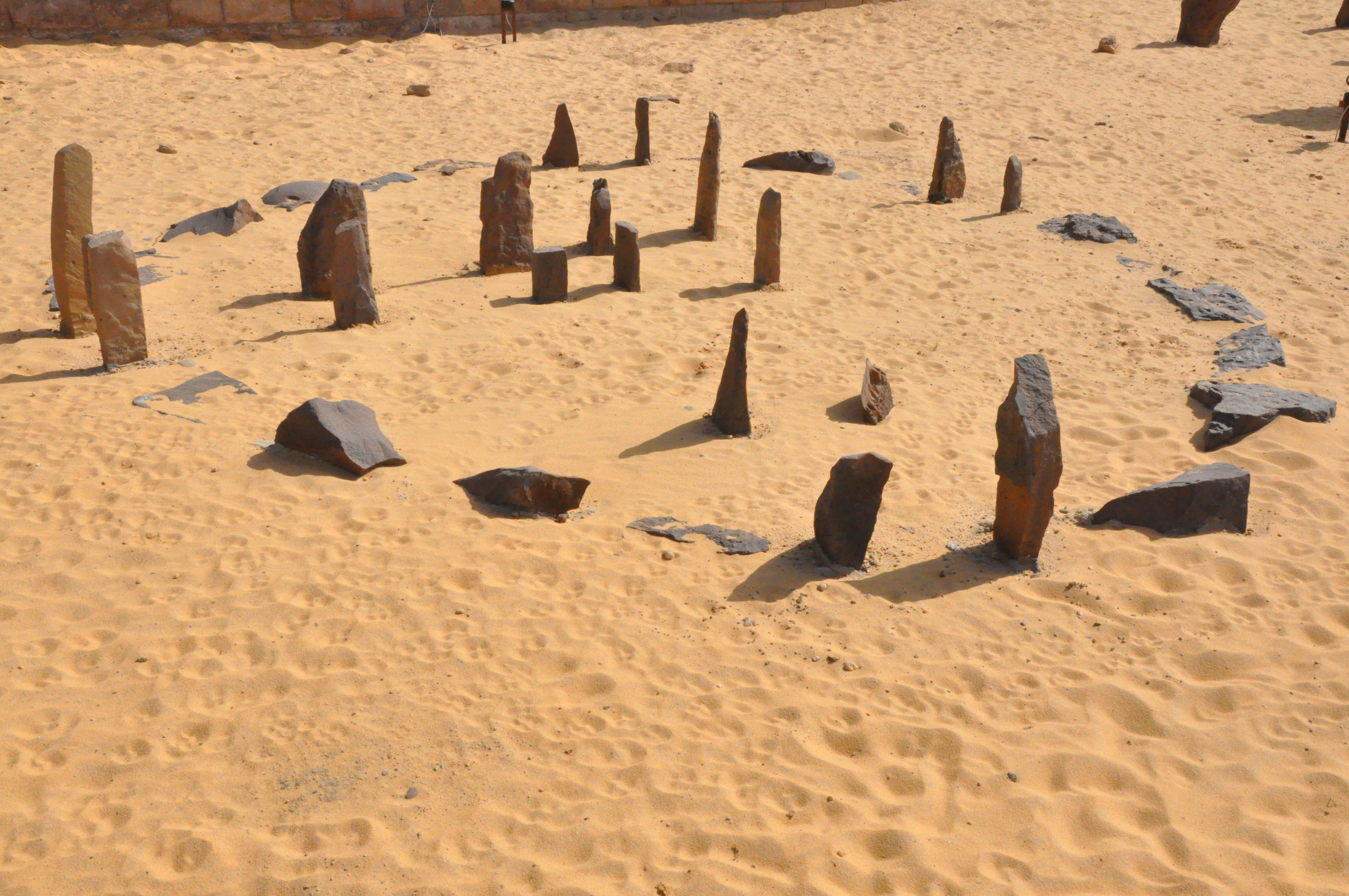
Nabta Playa "calendar circle", reconstructed at Aswan Nubia museum.

Lower Nubia is located within the borders of modern-day Egypt but is south of the border of Ancient Egypt, which was located at the first cataract of the Nile.

=== Nabta Playa ===
Nabta Playa was once a large internally drained basin in the Nubian Desert, located approximately 800 kilometers south of modern-day Cairo or about 100 kilometers west of Abu Simbel in southern Egypt, 22.51° north, 30.73° east. Today the region is characterized by numerous archaeological sites. The Nabta Playa archaeological site, one of the earliest of the Egyptian Neolithic Period, is dated to circa 7500 BC. Also, excavations from Nabta Playa, located about 100 km west of Abu Simbel for example, suggest that the Neolithic inhabitants of the region included migrants from both Sub-Saharan Africa and the Mediterranean area. According to Christopher Ehret, the material cultural indicators correspond with the conclusion that the inhabitants of the wider Nabta Playa region were a Nilo-Saharan-speaking population.

Egyptian historian H. A. A. Ibrahim examined the megalithic complex of Nabta Playa, Upper Egypt to understand the cultural and population influences of the Holocene on pre-dynastic Egypt. She cited an anthropological study confirming the appearance of a Sub-Saharan high status child in a ceremonial center and concluded that the megalithic structures had close resemblance to comparable structures in the Sahelian and Sub-Saharan regions of Africa.

== Timeline ==
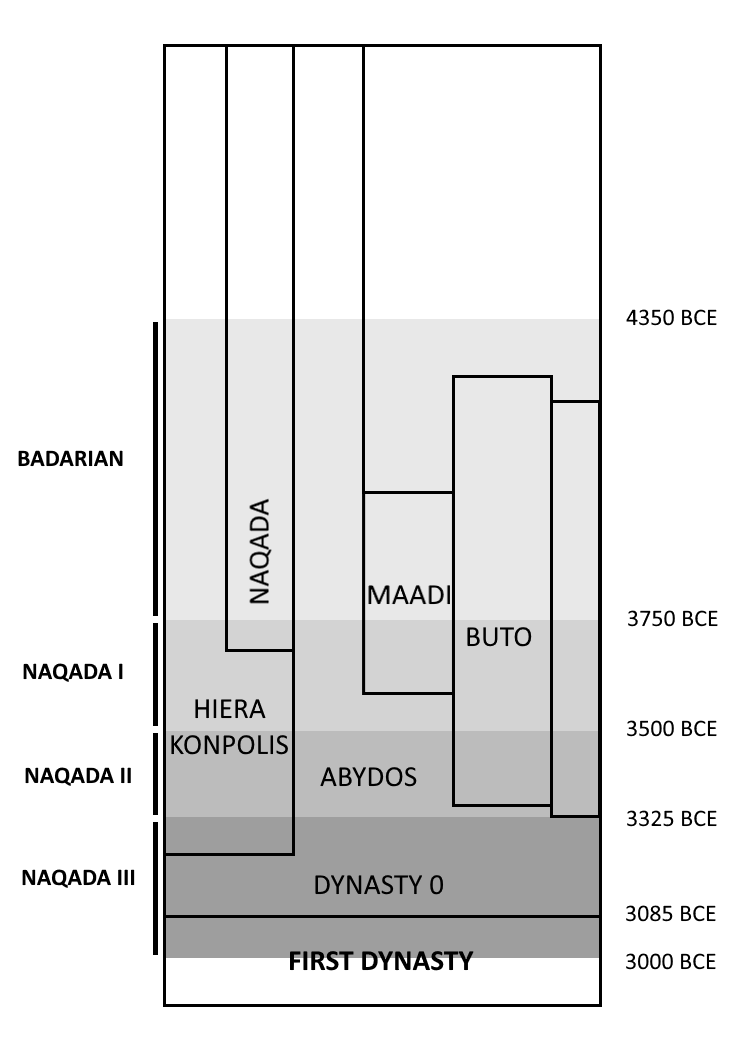
Chronology of state formation in Ancient Egypt.

- Late Paleolithic, from 40th millennium BC
  - Aterian tool-making
  - Semi-permanent dwellings in Wadi Halfa
  - Tools made from animal bones, hematite, and other stones
- Neolithic, from 11th millennium BC
  - c. 10,500 BC: Wild grain harvesting along the Nile, grain-grinding culture creates world's earliest stone sickle blades roughly at end of Pleistocene
  - c. 8000 BC: Migration of peoples to the Nile, developing a more centralized society and settled agricultural economy
  - c. 7500 BC: Importing animals from Asia to Sahara
  - c. 7000 BC: Agriculture—animal and cereal—in East Sahara
  - c. 7000 BC: in Nabta Playa deep year-round water wells dug, and large organized settlements designed in planned arrangements
  - c. 6000 BC: Rudimentary ships (rowed, single-sailed) depicted in Egyptian rock art
  - c. 5500 BC: Stone-roofed subterranean chambers and other subterranean complexes in Nabta Playa containing buried sacrificed cattle
  - c. 5000 BC: Alleged archaeoastronomical stone megalith in Nabta Playa.
  - c. 5000 BC: Badarian: furniture, tableware, models of rectangular houses, pots, dishes, cups, bowls, vases, figurines, combs
  - c. 5000 BC: Cosmetics
  - c. 4500 BC: Donkey domestication
  - c. 4400 BC: finely-woven linen fragment
- From 4th millennium BC, inventing has become prevalent
  - 4th millennium BC: Gerzean tomb-building, including underground rooms and burial of furniture and amulets
  - c. 4000 BC: early Naqadan trade
  - c. 4000 BC: Conifer wood imported from West Asia
  - c. 4000 BC: Faience, some of the world's earliest-known glazed ceramic beads
  - c. 3900 BC: An aridification event in the Sahara leads to human migration to the Nile Valley
  - c. 3500 BC: Lapis lazuli imported from Badakshan and / or Mesopotamia
  - c. 3500 BC: Senet, world's oldest (confirmed) board game
  - c. 3400 BC: (Meteoric) iron works, mortar (masonry)
  - c. 3300 BC: Double reed instruments and lyres (see Music of Egypt)
  - c. 3100 BC: Pharaoh Narmer, or Menes, or possibly Hor-Aha unified Upper and Lower Egypt

== See also ==
- 5.9 kiloyear event
- Prehistoric Arabia
- Prehistoric North Africa
