= Halfan =

Halfan may refer to:

- Halofantrine, an anti-malarial drug
- Halfan culture, 18,000 to 12,500 BC in Nubia and Egypt
