= Sequence dating =

Archaeological relative dating method based on linking pottery styles to time periods

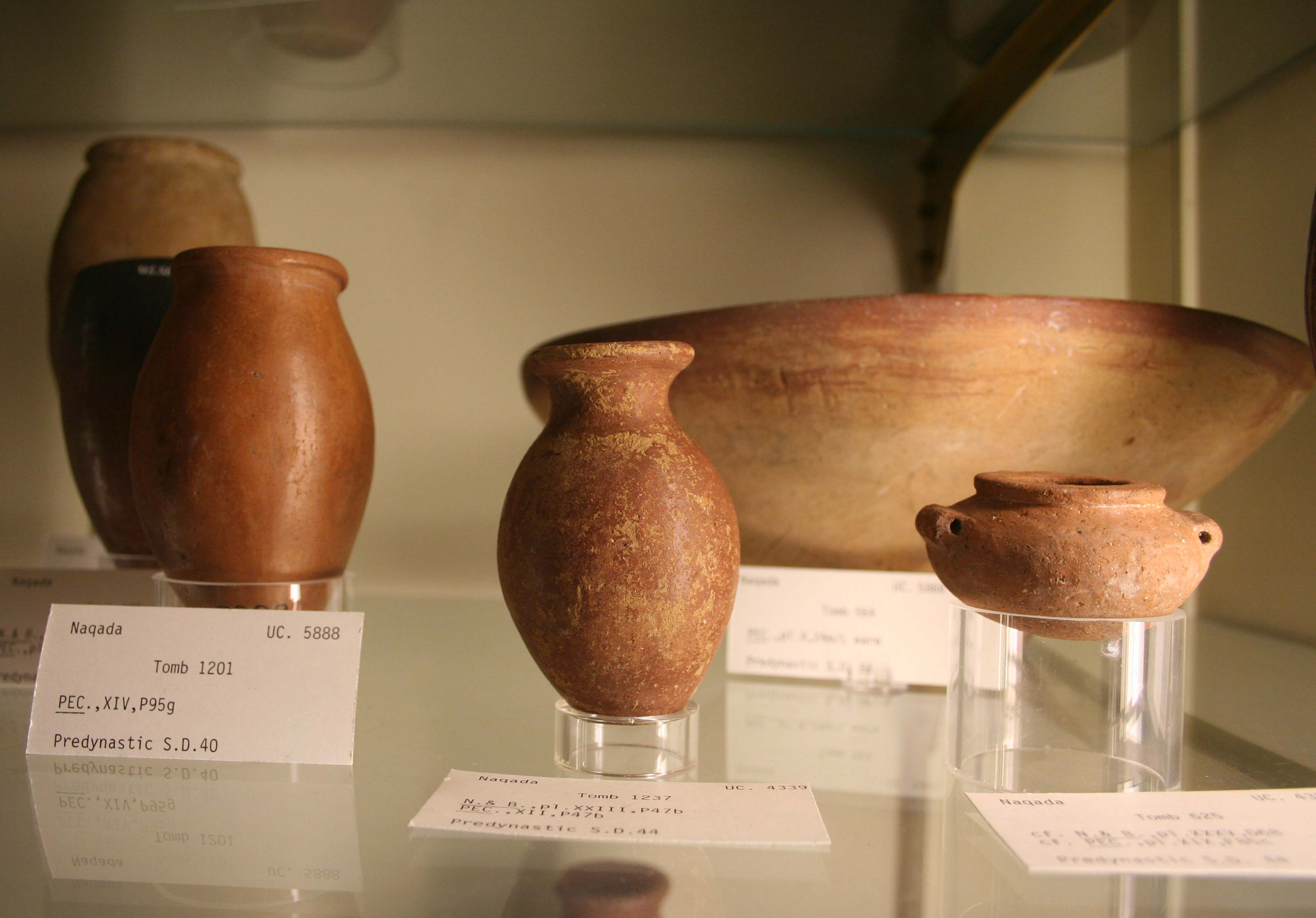
Predynastic pottery from the Naqada culture in the Petrie Museum

Sequence dating, an archaeological relative dating method, allows assemblages to be arranged in a rough serial order, which is then taken to indicate time. Sequence dating is a method of seriation developed by William Matthew Flinders Petrie. By linking styles of pottery with different time periods, he was able to establish the relative chronology of the site.

Sir Flinders Petrie was the first to use seriation in Egyptology. Flinders Petrie, the younger contemporary of archaeologist Augustus Pitt Rivers, was meticulous in his excavations and recorded every artifact and detail on site. From his work, Petrie was able to bring chronological order to 2,200 pit graves of the Naqada cemetery in Upper Egypt.

The sequence dating method allowed the relative date, if not the absolute date, of any given Predynastic Egypt site to be ascertained by examining the handles on pottery, general form of the piece, and the stratigraphic layer it was found in. As more evidence of the predynastic period is uncovered, this dating method in relation to the pottery on site aids in determining the relative date of the site.

== Types of seriation ==
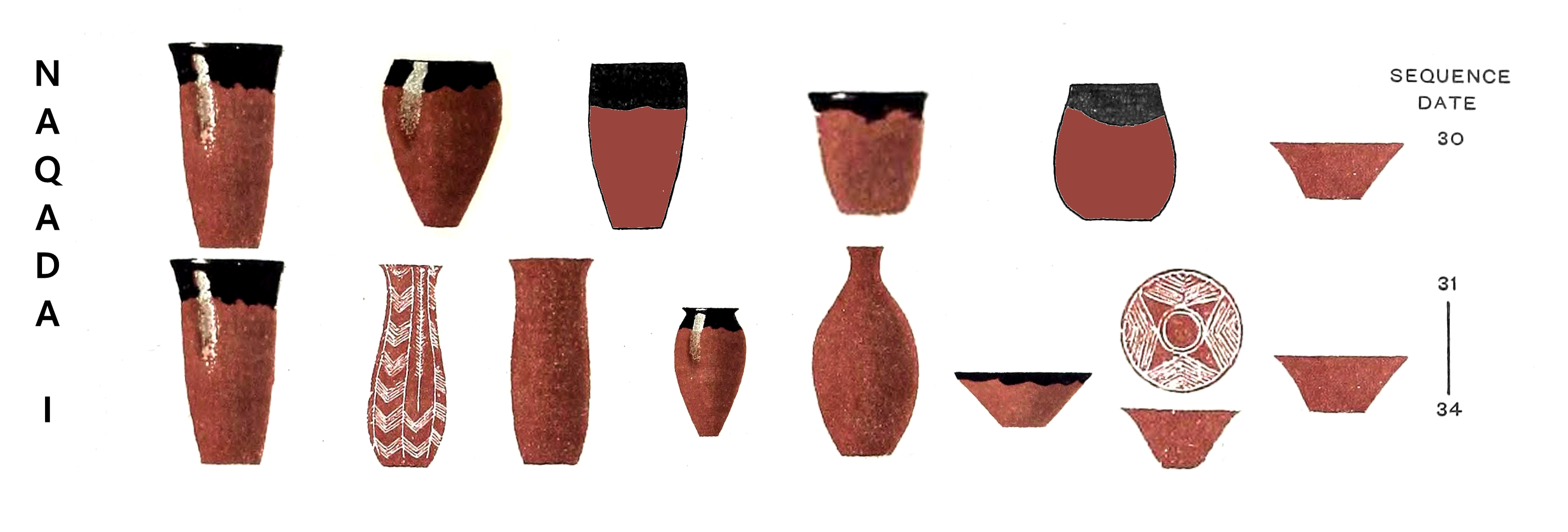
Naqada I pottery, per Flinders Petrie, with Sequence Dating numbers

=== Contextual seriation ===
Contextual seriation, which was developed by Flinders Petrie, created sequences of assemblages and arranged them in what he thought was their chronological order based on the inventory of grave contents, his work in Egypt proved this to be a generally true reflection of their chronological sequences.

=== Frequency seriation ===
Frequency seriation measures changes in abundance of a certain ceramic style. This technique was developed in a pioneering paper by W.S. Robinson and G.W. Brainerd, published in 1951. It was created because of artifacts in Mayan sites that had been recovered in the 1940s without stratigraphic context. The assumption was that certain styles of pottery were popular in certain times, and during that time, the popularity would reach a peak and then fade away. So, if a similar style of pottery was found at a different site, they must be from around the same time period.

== Development ==
The European strategy would eventually make its way into Americanist archaeology during the late 19th century, but it would not be until the second decade of the 20th century that sequence and detail became a part and parcel of archaeology method. Sequence dating has been deemed an obsolete and inaccurate method of dating archaeological sites and artifacts, since archaeologists have discovered more precise methods of dating archaeological sites and artifacts.

== See also ==
- Archaeological association
- Archaeological context
- Archaeological phase – Process to reveal former land use
- Excavation
- Harris matrix
- Law of superposition – Law stating that newer strata stack above older ones
