= Halfan culture =

Prehistoric people in the Upper Nile Valley

- Geographical range: Nubia
- Period: Epipalaeolithic
- Dates: 22.5-22.0 to 16.0 ka cal BP
- Preceded by: Khormusan
- Followed by: Qadan culture, Sebilian

The Halfan industry is one of the Late Epipalaeolithic industries of the Upper Nile Valley that seems to have appeared in northern Sudan c. 22.5-22.0 ka cal BP. It is one of the earliest known backed-bladelet industries in Northern Africa, dating between 22.5 and 16 ka cal BP in Nubia. The Halfan is restricted to the north of Sudan. A parallel industry discovered in Egypt, which is in all respects similar, is known as the Kubbaniyan.

It has been suggested that the Halfan was related to the Iberomaurusian industry in the Maghreb. The earliest Iberomaurusian is dated to c. 26.0-22.5 ka cal BP and it is not clear whether the Iberomaurusian or the Halfan is more ancient. The Halfan is believed to have descended from the Khormusan Culture which depended on specialized hunting, fishing, and collecting techniques for survival.

The Halfan people survived on a diet of large herd animals and the Khormusan tradition of fishing. Greater concentrations of artifacts indicate that they were not bound to seasonal wandering, but settled for longer periods at preferred and more convenient sites from where to make short forays into their seasonal ones. The primary material remains of the Halfan complex are their stone tools, flakes, and a multitude of rock paintings.

The Halfan industry is characterized by three main tools: Halfa flakes, backed microflakes, and backed microblades. It is only during a transitional stage that all three occur in significant amounts, but all types do occur in every assemblage. The most general observation, is the relative proportions of flakes, microblades, and cores chosen for retouch. This reflects both the tools desired in each assemblage (i.e., Halfa flakes vs. backed microblades), and the degree of the development of the microblade technology (i.e., backed flakes vs. backed microblades).

The only type which shows a high stage of development is the Halfa core. The basic orientation of the Halfa core to opposed platforms is reflected in the number of poor opposed platform flake cores. These are never extensively utilized, and no real care has gone into their initial preparation. The Halfa core does, however, have a number of features which could lead to more generalized, yet effective, core types.

Levallois cores are present, but they are poorly made and have not received the careful attention that the Halfa cores have. In fact, the Levallois flake is merely a more generalized form of Halfa flake and as such could have been of no great value to an industry producing Halfa flakes.
