= Sebilian =

Archaeological culture in Egypt spanning c. 13,000 – 10,000 BCE

- Geographical range: Nubia
- Period: Prehistoric Nubia
- Dates: circa 15,000 BE — circa 12,000 BE
- Preceded by: Halfan culture
- Followed by: Qadan culture

The Sebilian is a pre-historic archaeological culture in Nubia spanning the period c. 13,000–10,000 B.C.

== Location ==
The culture is known by the name given by Edmond Vignard to finds he located at Kom Ombo on the banks of the river Nile from 1919 continuing into the 1920s.

Nine sites were found by A. Marks in the area of the Wadi Halfa; Wendorf located three approximately 10 kilometres from Abu Simbel. The culture is located in entirety only in proximity to the Nile, ranging from Wadi Halfa to Qena.

== Dating ==
The culture was dated by Vignard as spanning the period c. 13,000–10,000 B.C.

Dating by way of geology shows the industry to have occurred within a period 15,000 - 10,500 B.C though the industry has been subsequently re-established sui generis as emerging during 13,000 BC.

Later archaeology had identified the Sebilian as having occurred during the same periods of time as those industries named the Silsilian, and the Sebekian of Upper Egypt that occurred 12,000 B.C. or perhaps earlier.

Vignard's analysis of the findings have been criticised, and later re-evaluated by P.E.L. Smith and Fekri Hassan though are considered to have given life to the modern field of investigation into a hitherto unknown (or only surmised) area of pre-history of Egypt.

== Characteristics ==
Sebilian implements were located along the Nile River at the 10–15 foot terraces. The formal characteristics of the finds indicate a development of technique that passed through three phases.

- SEBILIAN I were formally akin to Mousteroid tool-points, using a technique typical of the levallois diorite based industry, with few microburins present archaeologically.
- SEBILIAN II and III tools were made using a technique indicative of a microblade industry that had changed the production material to flint with a much greater number of microburins found.

The industry was re-designated SEBILIAN based on those previously classified type I, and described as crudely produced, possibly resultant of the necessities of the occasional opportunities for groups engaged in hunting activities.

The dietary manifestations evidenced were of the sort expected from a semi-sedentary population living near to the Nile river, namely fish, and much less frequently crocodile and turtle.
