= Nazlet Khater =

Archaeological site in Upper Egypt

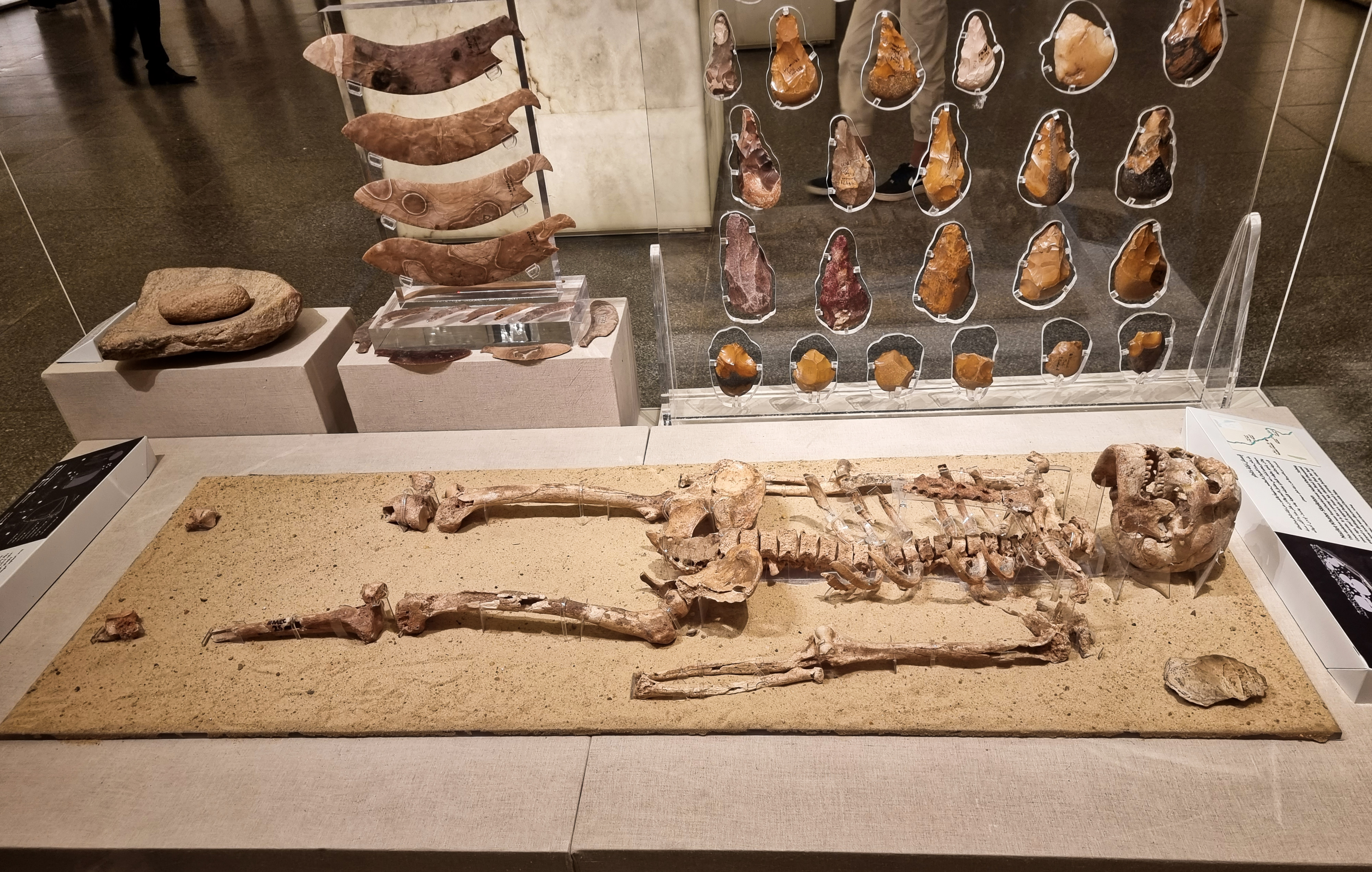
Skeleton from Nazlet Khater

Nazlet Khater is an archeological site located in Upper Egypt that has yielded evidence of early human culture and anatomically modern specimens dating to approximately thirty to fifty thousand years ago.

Excavations at the Nazlet Khater 2 site (Boulder Hill) yielded the remains of two human skeletons in 1980. One of the skulls was that of a male subadult. The cranium was generally modern in form, but with a very wide face, and it evinced some archaic traits in the temple and mandible areas. Below the skull, the skeleton was robust, but otherwise, anatomically modern. Morphological analysis of the Nazlet Khater mandible indicates that the specimen was distinct from the examined Late Pleistocene and Holocene North African specimens.

Ron Pinhasi and Patrick Semal (2000) found strong Stone Age Sub-Saharan affinities in the 33,000 year old skeleton from Nazlet Khater, Upper Egypt as the authors noted "The morphometric affinities of the 33,000 year old skeleton from Nazlet Khater, Upper Egypt are examined using multivariate statistical procedures. The results indicate a strong association between some of the sub-Saharan Middle Stone Age (MSA) specimens, and the Nazlet Khater mandible, which are different from modern sub saharan africans. Furthermore, the results suggest that variability between African populations during the Neolithic and Protohistoric periods was more pronounced than the range of variability observed among recent African and Levantine populations."

The Nazlet Khater 2 skeleton possesses two plesiomorphic features in its mandible, which are not found among coeval, anatomically modern, humans. This suggests that the ancestors of the specimen may have interbred with neighboring late archaic humans. At Nazlet Khater 4 to the southeast, Upper Paleolithic axes, blades, burins, end scrapers, and denticulates were also excavated. The site has been radiocarbon dated to between 30,360 and 35,100 years ago. The similarities between NK2 and Upper Paleolithic European samples may indicate a close relationship between this Nile Valley specimen and European Upper Paleolithic modern humans.

Since 2021, the skeletal remains of Nazlet Khater mummy is exhibited in National Museum of Egyptian Civilization
