= Khormusan =

Paleolithic archeological industry in Nubia

Khormusan industry was a Paleolithic archeological industry in Nubia dated at 42,000 to 18,000 BP.

The Khormusan industry in Nubia began between 42,000 and 32,000 BP. Khormusans developed tools not only from stone but also from animal bones and hematite. They also developed small arrow heads resembling those of Native Americans, but no bows have been found. The end of the Khormusan industry came around 18,000 BP, with the appearance of other cultures in the region, including the Gemaian. It was succeeded by the Halfan culture.
