= Sudan floods =

Sudan floods can refer to:

- 1988 Sudan floods
- 2007 Sudan floods
- 2013 Sudan floods
- 2018 Sudan floods
- 2020 Sudan floods – Floods within Sudan caused by rainfall
- 2022 Sudan floods – Natural disaster in the Sudan in 2022
- 2024 Sudan floods

== See also ==
- Floods in South Sudan (South Sudan being independent from Sudan as of 2011)
