= List of floods in Sudan =

In Sudan, frequent floods occur due to the high water levels of the Blue Nile River, which meets the White Nile in Khartoum. From 2017 to 2021, there were 388,600 people affected by floods annually.

== List ==
date of flood	level	losses
1946	unknown	The 1946 flood caused great destruction in Sudan, causing casualties and caused the spread of infectious diseases
1988	15.68 cubic metres (554 cu ft)	76 dead, hundreds wounded, and many economic losses
2007	unknown	64 dead, 335 wounded, and 30,000 homes destroyed
2013	17.4 cubic metres (610 cu ft)	More than 300,000 people were affected, the flood destroyed more than 25,000 homes. Government agencies also announced the deaths of nearly 50 people.
2018	15.6 cubic metres (550 cu ft)	At least 23 people were killed, more than 60 people were injured, more than 19,640 homes were destroyed, and an estimated 222,275 people were affected by these floods.
2020	More than 17 cubic metres (600 cu ft)	At least 100 people were killed, more than 500,000 people were affected by the flood, and more than 100,000 square meters were destroyed.
2022	16.42 cubic metres (580 cu ft)	According to reports, more than 97,227 have been displaced, 4,800 livestock have been lost, and nearly 5,100 hectares of land have been damaged or destroyed.
2024	unknown	At least 100 people were killed, at least 12,000+ houses destroyed or damaged, 198,000 feddans (~205,500 acres) of farmland damaged, 44,000+ displaced
