= Agriculture in Sudan =

Economic sector in Sudan

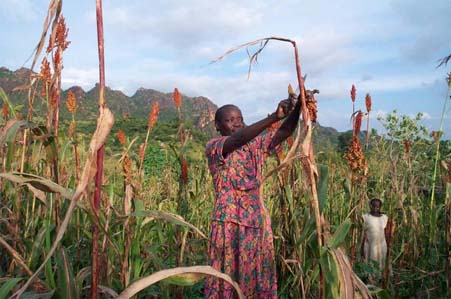
A farmer in the Nuba Mountains

Agriculture in Sudan plays an important role in that country's economy. Agriculture and livestock raising are the main sources of livelihood for most of the Sudanese population. It was estimated that, as of 2011, 80 percent of the labor force were employed in that sector, including 84 percent of the women and 64 percent of the men.

Agricultural products regularly accounted for about 80 to 95 percent of exports until the oil industry came on line. Total sector activities contributed an estimated 35.5 percent of GDP in 2006, a decline from the years prior to the development of the oil industry. Crop cultivation was divided between a market-oriented sector comprising mechanized, large-scale irrigated and rain-fed farming (mainly in central Sudan) and small-scale farming following traditional practices carried out in parts of the country where rainfall or other water sources were sufficient for cultivation.

Large investments occurred over time in mechanized, irrigated, and rain-fed agriculture, which together accounted for roughly two-thirds of Sudan’s cultivated land. The early emphasis on growing cotton on irrigated land decreased. Peanuts, wheat, and sugarcane are major crops, and considerable quantities of sesame also are grown. Rain-fed mechanized fanning continues to produce mostly sorghum, but the cultivation of sesame has increased, and short-fiber cotton is also grown. Production in both subsectors increased domestic supplies and export potential. This gain appeared, however, to have been achieved mainly by expanding the cultivated area rather than by increasing productivity.

Most subsistence cultivators produced sorghum as their staple crop, although in the northerly rain-fed cultivated areas millet was the principal staple. Subsistence farmers also grew peanuts and sesame. Following food shortages in 2001, there was an attempt to increase land area for the production of food. The increase in food production, however, was at the expense of the production of export crops, although export crops increased in 2004 and the export of sesame and cotton continued to increase through 2008.

== History ==
Around 4000 B.C. there was harvesting of wild grains, fishing, hunting, and the domestication of sheep, goats and dogs. The harvesting of wild grains was well established in Nubia, especially during wet seasons. From about 3000 B.C. migrants brought the technique of simple tilling and cultivation to the area of modern Kordofan. Cultivation also spread to the Ethiopians highlands, which spurred the Nilotes to come down to more hospitable plains of the present Sudan region. By 2000 B.C. pastoralism had arrived with the long-horned cattle and products such as milk and butter were added to diets. During the Meroitic Empire, while lasted from 750 B.C. to 350 A.D., agriculture was not longer limited to the Nile valley and expanded to areas such as the Butana plain which offered fertile clay. On the plain dura, sorghum and vulgare was grown for the first time and advancements enabled the construction of canals and sophisticated irrigation networks. Cotton was introduced in 400 B.C. and a textiles industry flourished for several centuries. Around the time of the Egyptian invasion in 1820, agriculture transformation had occurred with respect to irrigation, improved utilization of the rain lands, and new exotic crop species. Egyptian markets were also responsible for increased agricultural output. During the Mahdiya War (1881-1899) much of agriculture was abandoned as people fled. Soon after in the early 1900s cotton rapidly expanded due to high demand from the British. In 1937, the completion of the Jebel Aulia Dam, 50 Km South of Khartoum, transformed agricultural production.

The Gezira Scheme, which originated as a pilot cotton-growing project in 1911 during the Anglo-Egyptian period, expanded into one of the world’s largest irrigation projects. The completion of the Sennar Dam in 1925 enabled a major expansion of irrigated cotton cultivation and played a significant role in the modernization of Sudanese agriculture during the twentieth century.

== Land use ==
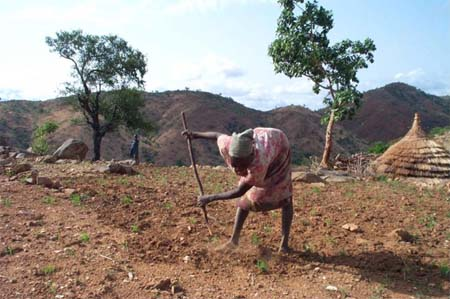
Farming in the Nuba Mountains

Before the secession of South Sudan, the Ministry of Agriculture estimated that Sudan had 84 million hectares of potentially arable land. The area under permanent crops was estimated at more than 19 million hectares in 2010, about 23 percent of potential arable land.

Substantial variations existed in land classified as actually used or potentially usable for livestock grazing. The Ministry of Agriculture and the United Nations Food and Agriculture Organization (FAO) classified about 24 million hectares as pastureland. In 1975, however, a United Nations interagency mission to Sudan had estimated the total potential grazing land at between 120 million and 150 million hectares. Total forest area declined from 71.2 million hectares in 1990 to 61.6 million hectares in 2000. The use of some woodland areas for grazing, the dearth of rainfall during the 1980s, and the ecological damage from mechanized farming caused steady deforestation.

In 2011 Sudan still had a substantial amount of land suitable for future cropping. The 1975 UN mission believed that two-thirds of the potential area for livestock grazing, however, was already in use, and that proportion had probably increased over time with the rising numbers of livestock. In addition to land suitable for cultivation and livestock grazing, Sudan also had about 76 million to 86 million hectares of desert. An area of about 2.9 million hectares was covered by swamps and inland water, and additional land was occupied by urban settlements and other man-made features.

== Land tenure ==
The right to own property, to bequeath it to heirs, and to inherit it was established by the 1973 constitution (then known as the Permanent Constitution), although that right was suspended in 1985. Sudan has long had a system of land registration through which an individual, an enterprise, or the government can establish title to a piece of land. Such registration was extensive in Northern Sudan, especially in the then-states of Al-Khartoum, Al-Awsat, and Ash Shamali. Before 1970 all other land (unregistered) belonged to the state, which held ownership in trust for the people, who had customary rights to it.

The Unregistered Land Act of 1970 declared that all waste, forest, and unregistered lands were government land. Private land was limited to that registered before 1970 under a 1929 land ordinance and was limited to agricultural land along the Nile and a few areas along other water courses. Such land amounted to only about 1 percent of all land. Individuals could, however, lease land from the government and gain usufruct rights.

The government owned most of the land used by the modern agricultural sector and leased it to tenants (for example, in the Gezira Scheme) or to private entrepreneurs, such as most operators of large-scale mechanized rain-fed farming. The lease rights were for specified periods of time; for example, leases rights for the large mechanized farms were typically for 25 years.

There were also many variants of land tenure. The communal land used for pasture and for subsistence cultivation was owned by the government but under the control of the community or local leader, who allocated it to households of the village or ethnic group for their exclusive cultivation. The rights to such land might be passed on to heirs, but ordinarily the land could not be sold or otherwise disposed of, nor used as collateral. The right was also retained to land left fallow, although in Bahr al-Ghazal, Upper Nile, and Equatoria there were communities where another individual could claim such land by clearing it.

Among the transhumant communities of the North, the rights to cultivated land were much the same, but the dominant position of livestock in community activities introduced certain other communal rights that included common rights to grazing land, the right-of-way to water and grazing land, the right to grass on agricultural land unless the occupier cut and stacked it, and the right to crop residues unless similarly treated. In the western savannas, private ownership of stands of hashab (gum arabic) trees could be registered, an exception to the usual government ownership of the forests, but dead wood for domestic fuel and the underlying grass were common property. Water, a matter of greatest importance to stock raisers, was open to all if free standing, but wells and the associated drinking troughs were private property and retained by the digger season after season. In Northern Sudan, especially in the western region where increasing population and animal numbers placed pressure on the land, violations of customary laws and conflicts between ethnic groups over rights to pasturage and water increased during the 1990s and early 2000s. These were major factors behind the warfare that began in Western Sudan in early 2003.

== Crops ==
Sesame seed became Sudan’s prime agricultural export commodity in the mid-1990s, and it was also used domestically to produce oil for cooking. The yield varied in recent years, with a production of 416,000 tonnes in 1996. It was 350,000 tonnes in 2008 and about 248,000 tonnes in 2010 because of a decline in productivity. As of 2018, Sudan produced 981,000 tons of sesame seed, making it the world's largest producer. Sesame exports earned US$141 million in 1996, some 23 percent of export revenues. They decreased to US$93 million in 2007, constituting 1.2 percent of export earnings, but increased to US$167.3 million in 2010.

Gum arabic is the most important forest product of Sudan, which accounts for 80 percent of the world’s supply. It is collected from acacia trees in Darfur and Kordofan and used widely in industry for products ranging from mucilage (for postage stamps), to foam stabilizers, to excipient in medicines and dietetic foods. The Gum Arabic industry markets the product, with restraints placed on the right of any private company to independently export unprocessed gum arabic in 2009. The justification given for regulating its sale is that its quality would deteriorate and export quantities and prices would decline if sales were deregulated. Moreover, even though gum arabic requires minimal processing and packaging, the prices received by producers in 2000-2001 were only 21 percent of world market prices. Export markets for it are price sensitive, as there are synthetic substitutes and competition from Chad, Mauritania, Senegal, Mali, and Nigeria. Production in 1994-95 was 84,000 tonnes. It declined to 16,000 tonnes by 2000 but surpassed 30,000 tonnes in 2010. Export earnings were US$40 million in 2003 and about US$24 million in 2010.

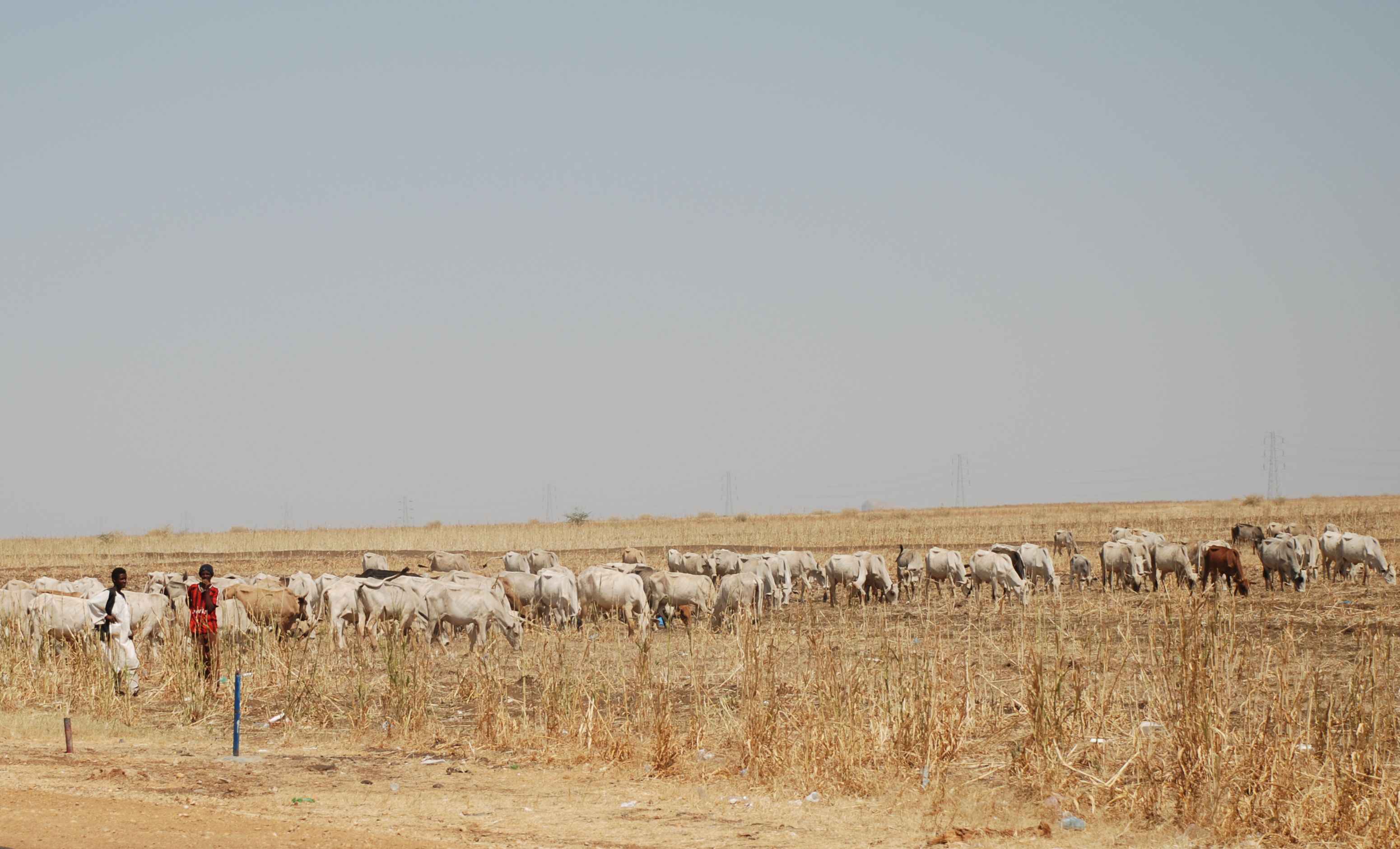
Cattle in sorghum field, Gezira

Peanuts are one of Sudan’s major cash crops. Peanuts grow on rain-fed land in the far west and also under irrigation. They are both a domestic source of food and oil and a major export. Production had been decreasing as a result of low producer prices, low world market prices, disease, and drought, but conditions turned around in the early 2000s. Production was 1.2 million tonnes in 2003, although revenues remained low. Production dropped around 2008-2010, but Sudan produced 2.8 million tons of peanuts as of 2018, making Sudan the fourth largest producer in the world. Exports provided US$741,000 in 2007 and US$200,000 in 2010.

Sorghum is the Sudanese staple food crop, but the yield varies, depending on weather conditions and the amount of irrigated land used for it. Production is also cyclical; when there are large surpluses of the grain, prices fall, discouraging production in the subsequent year. Output reached a high of nearly 5.2 million tonnes in 2003 but declined to 3.9 million tonnes in 2008 and to an estimated 2.6 million tonnes in 2010 as production continued to drop. In 2018, Sudan produced 4.9 million tons of sorghum, making it the world's third-largest producer. Exports in 2010 realized an estimated US$200,000.

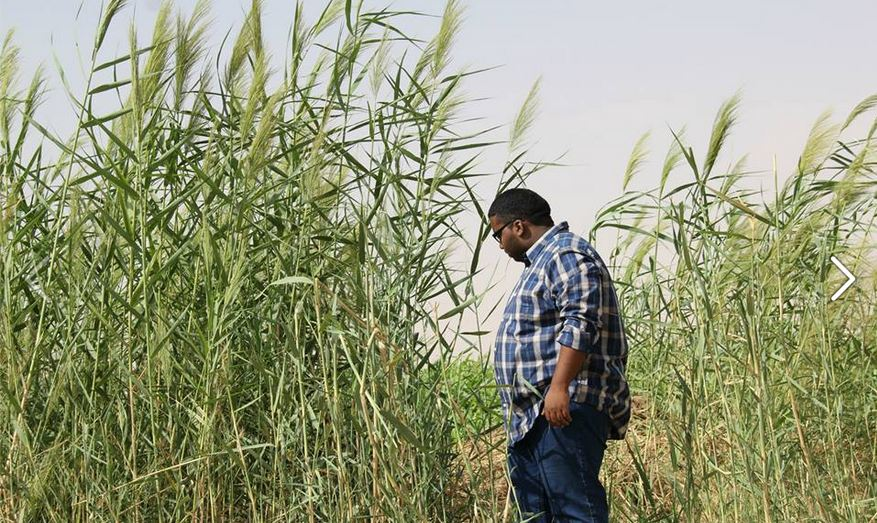
Wheat production in Karima

Wheat is also grown in irrigated areas as an import substitute. Its production varies in a pattern similar to that of sorghum, reacting to changes in prices. Production was 587,000 tonnes in 2008 but fell to 403,000 tonnes in 2010 because of a decrease in the cultivated area. As of 2018, Sudan produced 595,000 tons of wheat. Overall, grain production (sorghum, millet, and wheat) is insufficient for rising domestic demand, even with good harvests in recent years, requiring Sudan to depend upon imports, especially imports of wheat.

As of 2018, Sudan produced 2.6 million tons of millet, making it the third largest producer in the world.

Sugar production began in the 1960s to replace the second most expensive import after petroleum. The largest of the parastatal sugar projects, the Kananah Sugar Project, opened in 1981 and was important in eliminating sugar imports by 1986. In 1999 plans were announced for a large production facility in the White Nile region, with major funding from the Chinese government. Sudan and the People’s Republic of China also agreed to build a sixth sugar plant. And, in May 2002, Sudan inaugurated a new facility at the state-owned Sudan Sugar Company in New Haifa, which by the late 2000s produced 60,000 tonnes of white sugar per year. In 2008 sugar cane production throughout Sudan totaled 7.5 million tonnes. In 2018, production in Sudan was 5.9 million tons.

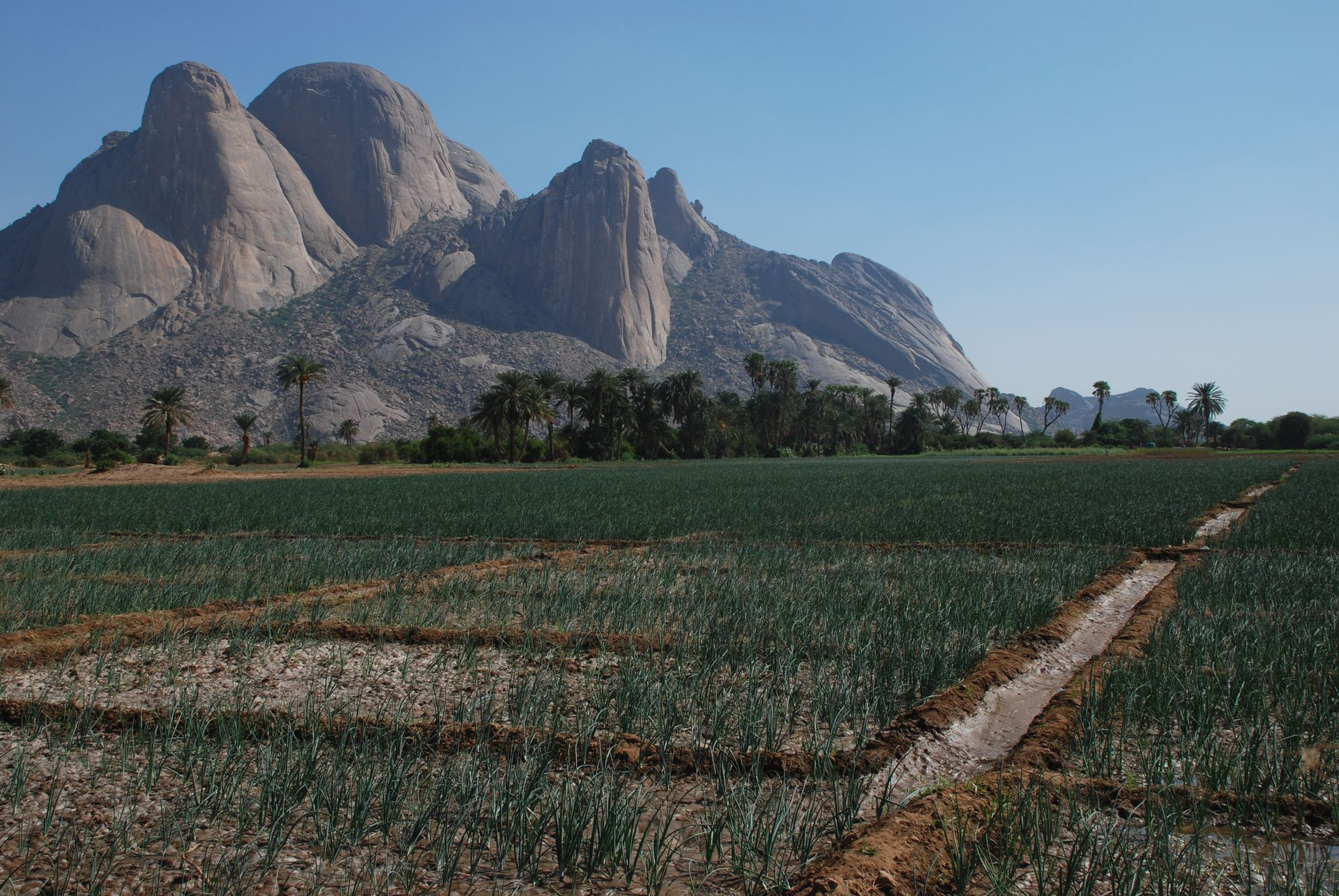
Onion fields in Kassala

Cotton was traditionally the most important export crop and the major irrigated crop, but it has declined in importance. The main types of cotton grown were medium-staple Akala, some long-staple Barakat, and a little long-medium staple Shambat B. A small amount of rain-fed, short-staple cotton was also grown. Cotton’s contribution to export revenue decreased from 53 percent in the 1970s to 1 percent in 2008. Exports of cotton provided US$134 million in earnings in 2008 but fell to an estimated US$40.4 million in 2010. In 2018, Sudan produced 160,000 tons of cotton.

As of 2018, Sudan also produced 1.5 million tons of onions, 951,000 tons of banana, 907 thousand tons of mango (including mangosteen and guava), 674,000 tons of tomato, 442,000 tons of potato, 440,000 tons of date, 304,000 tons of okra, 283 thousand tons of lemon, 240,000 tons of cucumber, 234,000 tons of grapefruit, 234,000 tons of sweet potato, 187,000 tons of yam, 172,000 tons of watermelon, 161,000 tons of orange, and smaller quantities of other agricultural products.

== Irrigated agriculture ==
Sudan had a modern irrigated agriculture sector totaling about 800,000 hectares in 2010, out of about 84 million hectares that were potentially arable. This was a slight decline from the prior year and well below the more than 2 million hectares of the early 1990s. The Nile and its tributaries were the source of water for 93 percent of irrigated agriculture, and of this, the Blue Nile accounted for about 67 percent. Gravity flow was the main form of irrigation, although pumps served part of the irrigated area.

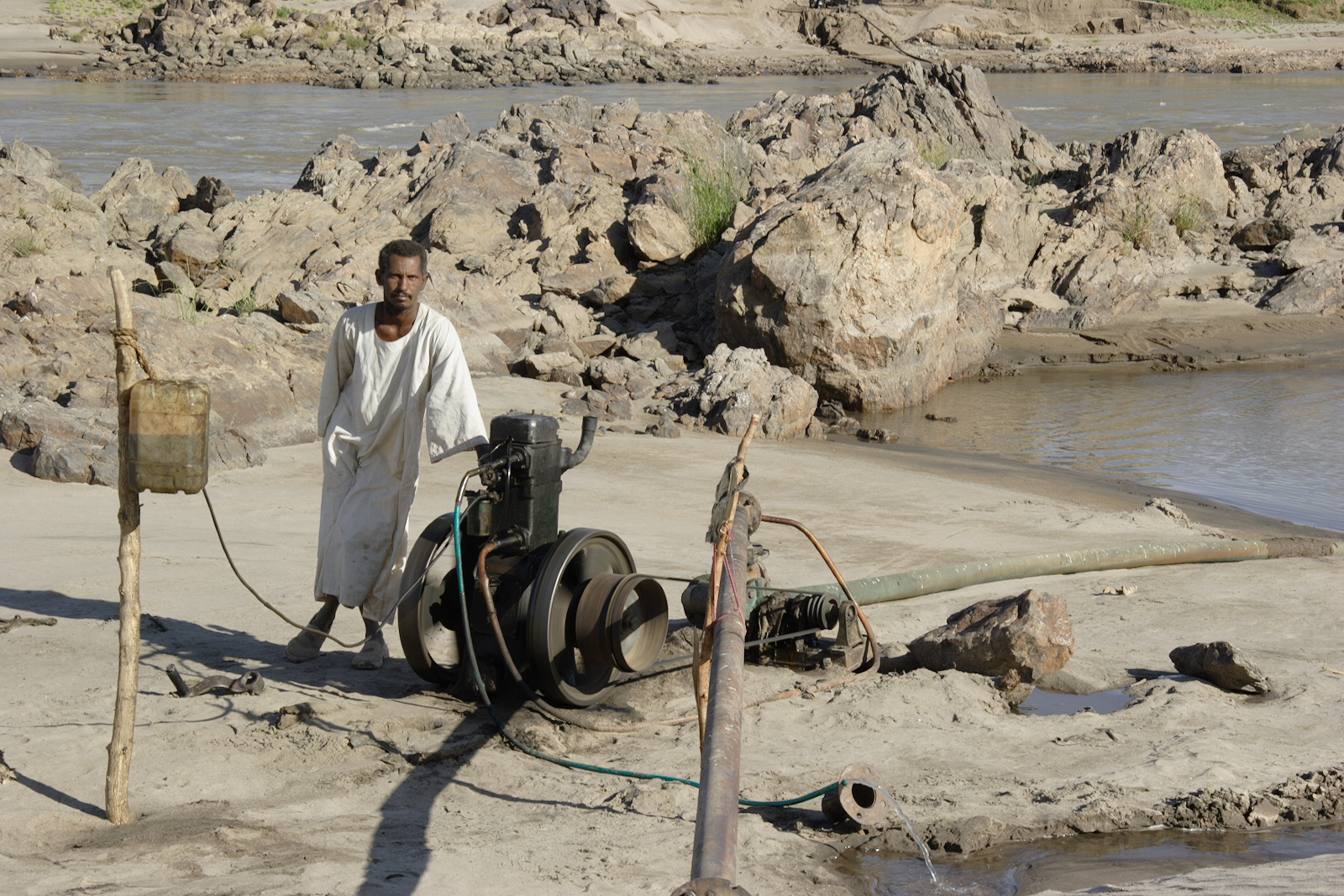
A Sudanese farmer operating an irrigation pump

The waters of the Nile in Sudan were used for centuries for traditional irrigation, taking advantage of the annual Nile flood. Such usage continued in the early 2000s, along with the traditional shaduf (a device to raise water) and waterwheel to lift water to fields in local irrigation projects. These devices were rapidly being replaced by more efficient mechanized pumps. Among the first efforts to employ irrigation for modern commercial cropping was the use of the floodwaters of the Qash River and the Barakah River (both of which originate in Eritrea) in eastern Sudan to grow cotton on their deltas, which began in the 1860s. Between the 1940s and the 1970s, various projects were developed to irrigate land. Both deltas yielded only one crop a year, watered by the flood. Adequate groundwater, however, offered the eventual possibility of using pump irrigation from local wells for additional cropping or for supplementing any flood shortages.

Since the 1950s, the government has constructed a number of large pump projects, mostly on the Blue Nile. These have included the Junayd project on the east bank of the Blue Nile east of the Gezira Scheme. In the 1970s, when the consumption and import of sugar grew rapidly, domestic production became a priority. Consequently, two major pump-irrigated sugar plantations were established on the White Nile in the Kosti area.

The government's Dams Implementation Unit signed contracts in 2010 with two Chinese companies for a US$838 million project in northeastern Sudan. The Upper Atbarah Dams Complex Project would comprise two dams, on the Setit and the Atbarah, and the Upper Nile Dam. The project was part of the dam-construction program that included the building of the 1,250-megawatt Merowe Dam and the heightening of the Roseires Dam. The new dams were expected to contribute to the irrigation of some 210,000 hectares of agricultural land and to help revitalize land in the New Haifa Agricultural Scheme.

== Rainfed agriculture ==
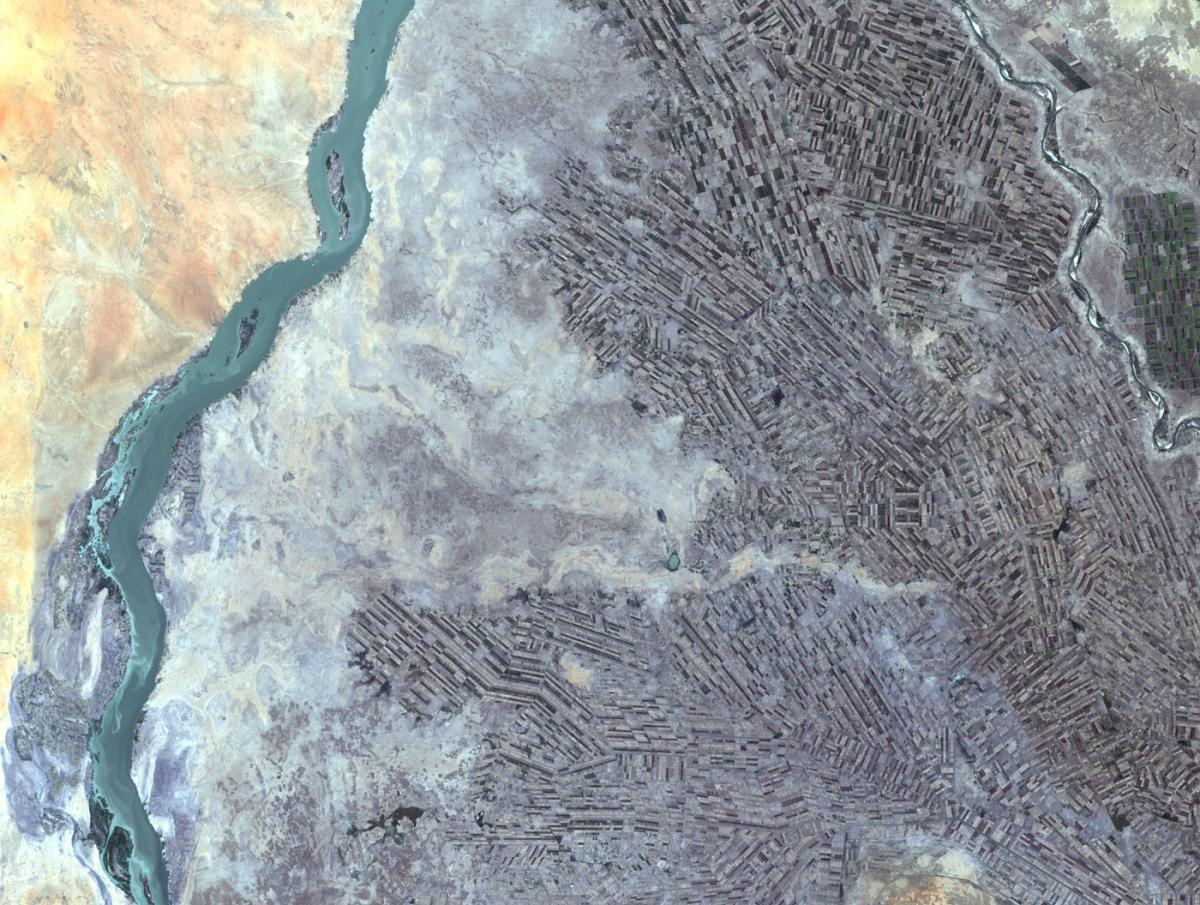
Irrigation of the Nile delta

Cultivation dependent on rainfall falls into two categories. Most Sudanese farmers had always relied on rainfed fanning. In addition to these traditional farms, there is a large modern mechanized rainfed agricultural sector.

=== Mechanized rainfed agriculture ===
The mechanized rainfed agricultural sector developed after 1944-45, when a government project to cultivate the cracking clays of central Sudan started in the area of Al-Gedaref (also seen as Al-Qadarif). Its prime purpose was to meet the food needs of army units stationed in British colonies in East Africa (present-day Kenya, Tanzania, and Uganda). The alkaline clays and loams in this area were not suitable for cultivation by hand or by oxen. An average of about 6,000 hectares a year was cultivated between 1945 and 1953, chiefly producing sorghum, under a sharecropping arrangement between the government and fanners who had been allocated land in the project. These estates proved costly, however, and in 1954 the government began encouraging the private sector to take up mechanized fanning in the area, a policy that continued after Sudan gained independence in 1956. The government maintained several state farms to demonstrate production methods and to conduct research, but research activities were very limited because of staffing and funding problems.

The private-sector response was positive, and by 1960 mechanized farming had spread into other areas of the cracking-clay zone in central and eastern Sudan. The government set aside rectangular areas that were divided into plots of 420 hectares (later raised in places to 630 hectares) each. Half of these plots were leased to private fanners, the other half left fallow. After four years, the originally leased land was to be returned to fallow and the farmer was to receive a new lease for an adjacent fallow area. When the demand for land grew faster than it could be demarcated, areas outside the designated project limits were taken over by private individuals. The four-year lease proved unpopular because it meant new investment in clearing land every four years, and apparently much of the worked land continued to be cultivated while fallow land was also placed under cultivation.

The investment requirements for mechanized farming favored prosperous cultivators, and eventually most farms came to be operated by entrepreneurs who raised capital through mortgageable property or other assets in the urban centers. Through arrangements with other individuals, these entrepreneurs frequently managed to control additional plots beyond the legal limit of two. Their ability to obtain capital permitted them also to abandon depleted land and to move into newly demarcated uncleared areas, a practice that had a deleterious impact on the environment, deprived the indigenous inhabitants of work opportunities, and increased desertification. The government established the Mechanized Farming Corporation (MFC) in 1968 as an autonomous agency under the Ministry of Agriculture and Natural Resources, to expand the operator base and to introduce more control over land allocation, crops, and farming methods. With loans from the IDA, the MFC was able to provide technical assistance, credit for land clearing and machinery, and marketing aid to individual farmers and cooperative groups. The MFC also became the operator of state farms.

The area under this system of management by the late 1990s had spread to about 5.9 million hectares in the states of Al-Gedaref, Blue Nile, Upper Nile, White Nile, Sinnar, and South Kordofan. The farms were then usually well over 420 hectares as a result of combining leased plots and creating family partnerships. The government also allocated large plots of 21,000^420,000 hectares to Sudanese and Gulf state investors.

Only a few crops were suitable for cultivation in the cracking-clay area, principally sorghum. Sesame and short-fiber cotton also grew successfully but in relatively smaller quantities. Land preparation, seeding, and most threshing were mechanized on these farms, but some threshing, as well as weeding and harvesting, was done by seasonal labor.

=== Traditional rain-fed agriculture ===
Traditional rain-fed farming involves nomadic and seminomadic peoples and transhumance, as well as settled agriculture, which also includes significant numbers of livestock. Although almost all these systems exist in every state, they are most prevalent in the Kordofan and Darfur States, Sinnar, and the Blue Nile and White Nile States. Livestock, part of almost every farming system, serve as both a capital asset and a hedge against the risk of farming, particularly because of recurrent droughts.

Settled farmers usually produce a combination of food crops and cash crops, such as karkade (hibiscus), sesame, and watermelon, on 4.2 to 6.3 hectares. The total area under crops in the traditional rain-fed fanning system in 2010 was estimated to be almost 12 million hectares.

== Animal husbandry ==
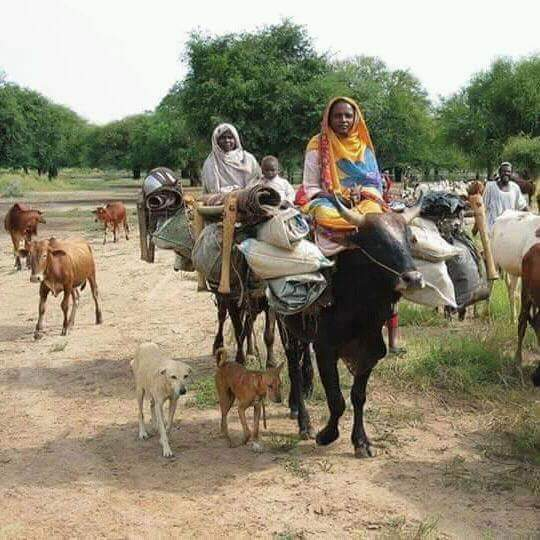
Baqqara people with cattle, Sudan

Livestock raising is important throughout Sudan except in the extremely dry areas of the North. It provides a large part or the entire livelihood of nearly half the population of Sudan, mainly in the traditional farming sector. In recent years, the government has encouraged commercial livestock production of camels, goats, sheep, and cattle for sale abroad. The range of offerings in the sector includes live animal exports, meat, hides and skins, and dairy products.

Livestock is of increasing importance in the agricultural economy, and it has become the fastest growing non-oil export sector. The Arab states of the Persian Gulf, especially Saudi Arabia, are the source of especially strong demand for Sudan’s livestock.

Sudanese cattle are of two principal varieties: Baqqara and Nilotic. The Baqqara and two subvarieties constitute the majority of the country’s cattle. This breed is found chiefly in the western savanna regions and in fewer, although significant, numbers farther to the east as far north as Kassala. Because of periodic rinderpest epidemics, the total number of cattle was relatively small until about 1930. A vaccination program begun about that time, and mass inoculations during the succeeding decades resulted in a great increase in numbers.

In the vast areas used by pastoral herders, cattle husbandry is conducted in an economic, cultural, and social context that evolved over generations. This includes an emphasis on increasing herd size as an investment for future family security. Small surpluses (usually bulls) are available for subsistence use, exchange, or sale for local consumption or export. Cattle are also used for marriage payments and for rituals. Numbers of cattle help to establish or increase status and power in a social system in which cattle are the measure of wealth.

Transhumant groups own most of the Nilotic variety of cattle, and their migrations, related to the wet and dry seasons, usually do not exceed 150-160 kilometers. The majority of Baqqara cattle belong to the Baqqara Arabs, who were once largely nomadic, but since at least the early 1900s usually maintained a settled base in which to cultivate crops. The farmers, their relatives, or their agents move the cattle over traditional migratory routes northward during the rainy season and southward to the area of the Bahr al-Arab as the dry season progresses. Migrations in either direction might amount to 400 kilometers.

The expansion of mechanized rain-fed agriculture in the region used by the Baqqara, continued government efforts to enlarge the cultivated area, and pressures on the land from the growing population gradually reduced grazing areas. At the same time, traditional cultural forces brought about a steady increase in cattle numbers. The result was a growing overstock and pasture depletion until the outbreak of civil war in 1983, which was followed by the devastating droughts of the 1980s and early 1990s that greatly reduced livestock numbers throughout Sudan.

Sheep are herded chiefly by transhumants in Darfur and Kordofan. Large numbers are found in the drier areas at greater elevations than the usual cattle zone. There were several breeds but the predominant and preferred one is the so-called desert sheep, which has both good weight and good milk yield. Villagers in Al-Gedaref and Sinnar also raise large numbers of sheep, mostly on a nonmigratory basis. Fodder comes from crop residues on irrigated and rain-fed farms and from vegetation along the rivers and canals.

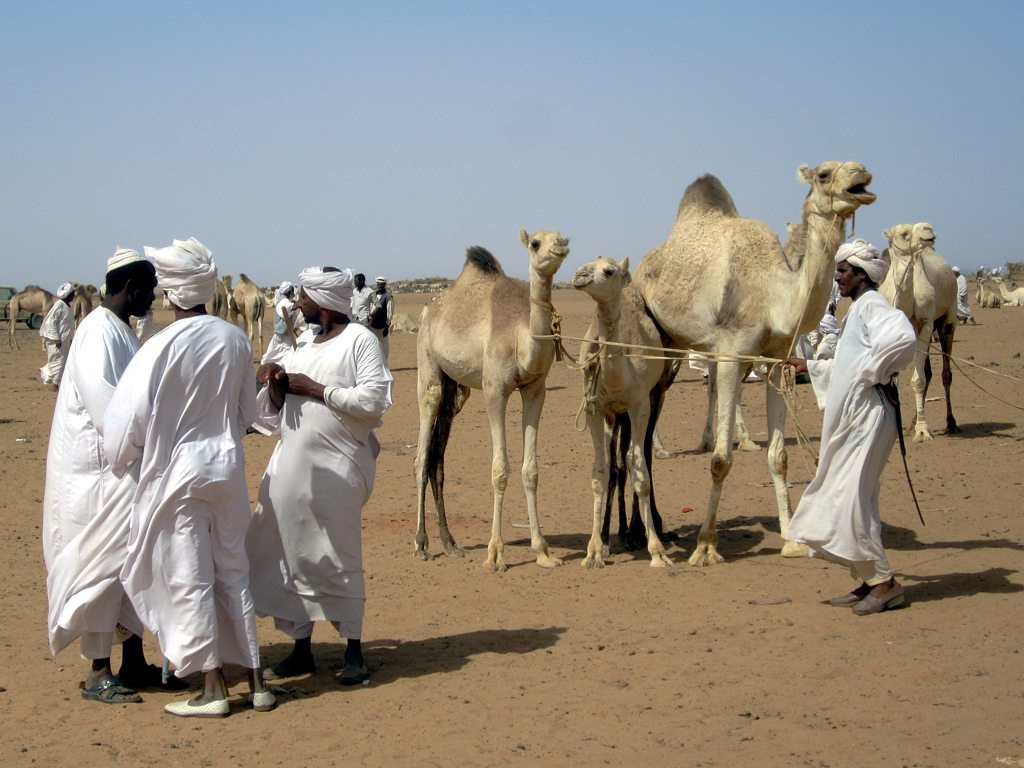
Herders at the camel market on the far west side of Omdurman

Goats, of which there are three principal breeds (desert, Nubian, and Nilotic), are found throughout the country south of the northern desert areas. They are raised mainly by settled families for milk and meat. Goat meat, although less popular than mutton, forms part of the diet of most families, particularly the poorer ones. Goat milk is an important source of protein, and many families in urban areas keep a few goats for their milk.

Camel farming in Sudan is largely concentrated in the desert and subdesert regions of northern Darfur, northern Kordofan, and southern Al-Gedaref. They are kept almost entirely by nomadic and seminomadic peoples, for whom the animal represents the preferred mode of transport. Camels are also important for milk and for meat. Camel ownership and numbers are sources of prestige in nomadic societies.

Donkeys, horses, and a small number of pigs (kept by such non-Muslim peoples as the Nuba) are also raised in Sudan. Poultry is raised mainly by farm families and villagers, although a modern sector consisting of government commercial operations and some semicommercial private ventures has developed. A significant poultry industry exists in Khartoum, and beekeeping has also been introduced.

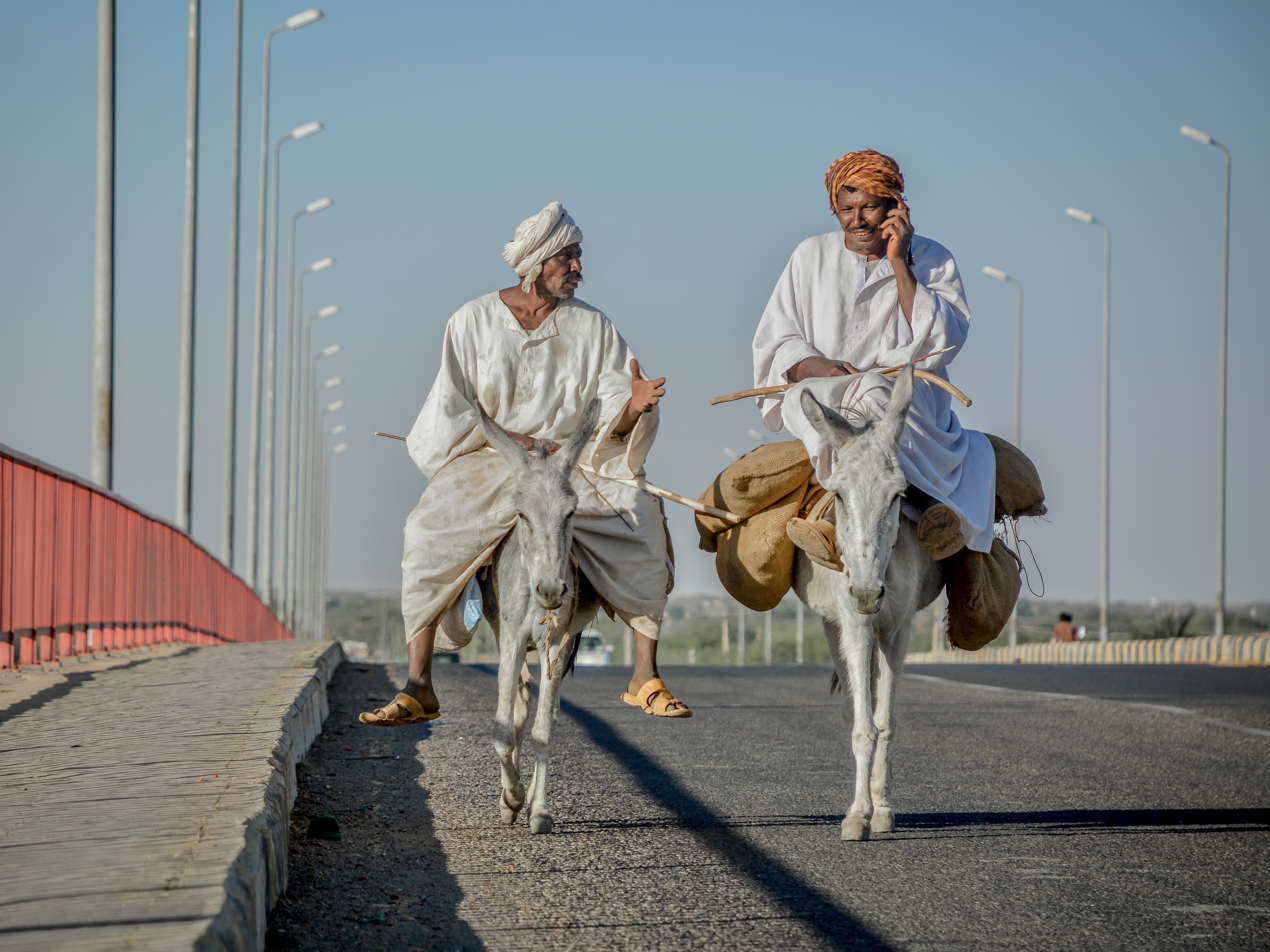
Men riding donkeys, Sudan

In 1983 Sudan’s more than 50 million animals comprised the second largest national herd in Africa, exceeded only by that of Ethiopia. By 1991 the herd had been reduced by perhaps one-third by the droughts of the 1980s-1991, the August 1988 floods in the South, described as the worst in Sudan's history, and the ravages of civil war in the South. Many families and indeed whole ethnic groups, who traditionally survived on their cattle, sheep, goats, or camels, lost all of their herds and were forced to migrate to the Three Towns (Omdurman, Khartoum, and Khartoum North) in search of sustenance.

Total livestock production increased rapidly in the second half of the 1990s. The numbers of sheep quadrupled in the 1990s in response to the export market in the Persian Gulf states, especially Saudi Arabia. In 2000, however, exports were affected by an outbreak of Rift Valley fever in Saudi Arabia. The Saudi government blamed the problem on livestock imported from East Africa, and Saudi Arabia and other Gulf states placed a ban on imports from the region, which had a severe impact on Sudan’s livestock sector. By 2004, livestock had rebounded from the impact of drought, floods, and Gulf-state import bans, with sales in that year of US$134 million. Another outbreak of Rift Valley fever caused some losses once again in 2007-8 and resulted in temporary import restrictions against Sudanese livestock. Sales declined to US$80 million in 2007, and to US$42 million in 2008.

Total livestock numbered almost 142 million head in 2010, including nearly 42 million cattle, 52 million sheep, 43.4 million goats, and 4.6 million camels, as well as thousands of horses, donkeys, and mules. The same year, Sudan exported 91,700 head of livestock at an estimated value of US$136 million. Further growth of the sector was predicted as Gulf investors, particularly from Saudi Arabia, had committed to investment in new production facilities.

== See also ==
- Forestry in Sudan
- Fishing in Sudan
