= Gressly =

Gressly is a surname. Notable people with the surname include:

- Amanz Gressly (1814–1865), Swiss geologist and paleontologist
- David Gressly (born 1956), American humanitarian
