= Seyi =

Nigerian given name

- Gender: Unisex
- Language: Yoruba

Origin
- Origin: Nigeria
- Region of origin: South western Nigeria

Other names
- Variant forms: Oluwaseyi, Oluseyi

Seyi, Oluseyi, or Oluwaseyi is a Yoruba unisex given name and an occasional surname.It means"does it".

== Given name ==
- Oluwaseyi Ayodele, Tech Advocate and 3MTT Nigeria Community Manager, Lagos
- Oluseyi Petinrin, Nigerian Air Force officer
- Josephine Oluseyi Williams, Nigerian financial expert
- Oluseyi Smith, Canadian sprinter
- Oluseyi Bajulaiye, United Nations official
- Seyi Ajirotutu, soccer player
- Oluwaseyi Makinde, Nigerian businessman
- Samuel Oluwaseyi Ameobi, professional footballer
- Oluwaseyi Babajide "Sheyi" Ojo, English footballer
- Oluwaseyi Akerele, Nigerian record producer and songwriter
- Joseph "Joe" Oluwaseyi Temitope Ayodele-Aribo, English professional footballer
- Seyi Abolaji, American soccer player
- Seyi Akiwowo, British women's rights activist and campaigner
- Adam Adeoye Oluwaseyi Yusuff, English professional footballer
- Seyi Shay, Nigerian-based singer and songwriter
- Seyi Olofinjana, Nigerian professional footballer

== Surname ==
- Hakeem Oluseyi
- Tani Oluwaseyi, Canadian soccer player
