= Sara Hebe =

Argentine musician (born 1983)

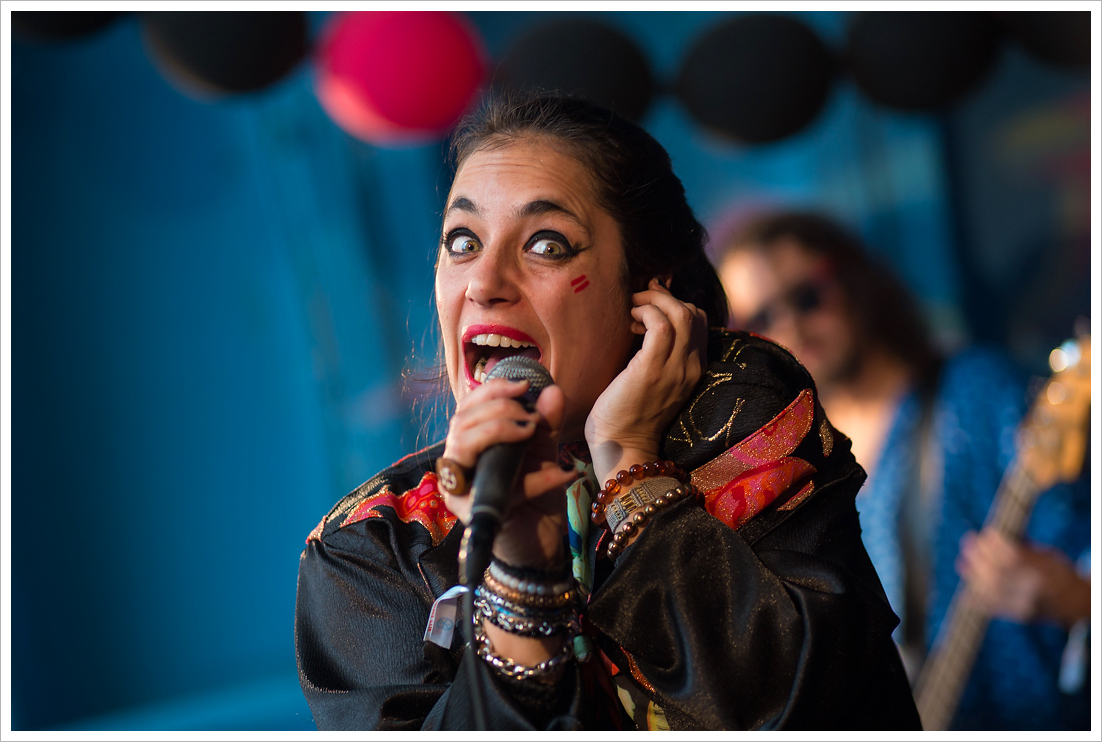
- Sara Hebe at the Fusion Festival (2015)

Background information
- Born: Sara Hebe Merino; July 9, 1983 (age 42); Trelew
- Origin: Chubut, Argentina
- Genres: electronic music, funk, political hip-hop, punk rock, rap, reggaeton
- Instrument: singing
- Years active: 2007–present
- Spinoffs: Ramiro Jota
- Partner: Flor Linyera
- Website: www.instagram.com/sara_hebe/

Sara Hebe Merino (born July 9, 1983, in Trelew) is an Argentine rapper and musician. The dominant genre of Hebe's work is rap, in addition to which she also performs music on the borderline of funk, punk rock, reggaeton and cumbia. The themes of Hebe's songs revolve around freedom of speech, feminism, the defence of human rights, social crisis and the political situation in Argentina. She describes herself as a transfeminist.

== Biography ==
Sara Hebe Merino was born on July 9, 1983, in Trelew, Argentina, in the province of Chubut. The singer's mother and grandmother passed on her love of poetry, which later influenced the direction of young Hebe's artistic way. From an early stage in her education, the artist was inspired by the attitude and output of Hebe de Bonafini and Estela de Carlotto:

Escucharlas te conmueve o no te conmueve. A mí me conmovió, me cambió la cabeza, me hizo pararme desde un lugar nuevo y desde ahí me puse a escribir, actuar, trabajar. Posicionada en ese lugar del sistema productivo e ideológico.

— Sara Hebe, Me cansé de opinar, no quiero repetirme, interview with Pikara Magazine

In 2001, Hebe began studying law in Buenos Aires, which she ultimately dropped out of. She began to take dance and theatre classes: for two years she trained in hip-hop and dancehall dance with choreographer Marita Amendola; she also completed a theatre workshop led by Norman Briski. In 2007, she began to compose her first songs, creating lyrics and music based on beats found on the Internet.

She released her first album in 2009 and its title, La Hija del Loco, referred to the nickname the young Hebe used in Chubut.

In January 2010, she was invited by the Free Culture Collective of the World Social Forum in Porto Alegre, Brazil, and in October of the same year, the Revolución de Caracas collective in Venezuela invited her to represent Argentina at the fifth International Hip-Hop Summit.

Since the beginning of her professional career, Hebe has collaborated with Ramiro Jota, an Argentinian DJ and music producer. The artist performs mainly in South and Central America and has toured twice in Europe.

Hebe is a lesbian committed to defending the rights of the LGBT community through her work. The rapper was in relationship with Flor Linyera, singer and keyboardist of the group Kumbia Queers.

== Discography ==
- La hija del Loco (2009)
- Puentera (2012)
- Colectivo Vacío (2015)
- Sara Hebe (2017)
- Politicalpari (2019)
- Sucia Estrella (2022)
