= Manuel Silva =

Manuel Silva may refer to:

- Manuel Silva (athlete) (born 1978), Portuguese Olympic athlete
- Manuel Silva (sport shooter) (born 1971), Portuguese sport shooter
- Manuel Silva (basketball) (born 1968), Angolan basketball coach and former player
- Manuel Fernando Silva (born 1973), Portuguese volleyball player
- Manuel Aranda da Silva, minister in the Mozambican Government
- Manuel Pereira da Silva (1920–2003), Portuguese sculptor
- Manu Silva (born 2001), Portuguese footballer
- Manuel Camilo Silva, mayor of the commune of Pichilemu
