= 2013 Sudan floods =

Continuous and heavy rains in much of Sudan, starting in early August 2013, resulted in flood damage in at least 14 of 18 Sudanese states. Over 300,000 people are reported to have been affected, with over 25,000 homes reported destroyed. Government agencies report that nearly 50 people have been killed.

== Flooding ==
As of 22 August 2013, the World Health Organization (WHO) reports that 320,000 people, or families, are affected. On 19 August, the WHO had estimated that about 250,000 people have been forced from their homes, with the Ministry of Health reporting 45 deaths and 70 injuries. Property damage was reported in 14 of the 18 Sudanese states and the WHO stated concern about the effect to public health of the collapse of an estimate 53,000 pit latrines. Flash floods continued to pose a danger in late August 2013.

The states affected are Khartoum, Northern, River Nile, Gezira, Red Sea, Sennar, North Kordofan, Gedaref, North Darfur, Blue Nile, White Nile and South Darfur, Kassala, and South Kordofan, according to the Ministry of Health. The Humanitarian Aid Commission further reports affected populations in Abyei and West Kordofan.

The capital Khartoum was reported to be suffering its worst flooding in 25 years, after flash floods struck urban areas earlier in August. While Khartoum is vulnerable to flash floods because of poor drainage and urban planning, the 2013 floods were particular severe. More than 15,000 homes in Khartoum are reported destroyed, with thousands more damaged. The most damage in Khartoum occurred in Shar El-neel, Ombadah, and Karari. In Blue Nile, floods from heavy rains destroyed almost 12,000 houses in Damazine, El Roseires, Giessan, and Bau, with Damazine reporting the most damage.

== Discrepancies in reported numbers ==
There are discrepancies between the numbers of affected given by different Sudanese agencies. The Ministry of Health estimates 66,895 affected households, while the Humanitarian Aid Commission estimates 105,964 households, as of 22 August 2013. Assuming five people per Sudanese household, the HAC estimate implies 530,000 affected individuals.

== Response ==
The Government of Sudan is leading and coordinating the emergency response. The Humanitarian Aid Commission activated the National Flood Task Force on 18 August. There has been public criticism of the government response. MP Al-Fadil Hag Suleima, head of the parliamentary subcommittee on Legislation and Justice, accused the administration of Omar al-Bashir of negligence in its response to the floods, and also stated that the states' governments were locating houses on flood plains for financial gain. Sudanese bloggers have been harshly critical, accusing the Khartoum state government of hiring companies associated with the ruling National Congress Party to build failed sewage and infrastructure projects. In response, two Khartoum state ministers accused Facebook bloggers of being "seculars" do not believe in the "act of God." The public outcry over the government response is seen as giving fresh energy to attempts to ignite an "Arab Spring-style uprising."

Saudi Arabia, Morocco, Qatar, United Arab Emirates, the United States, South Korea, Ethiopia, Germany, Japan and Egypt have pledged humanitarian aid to flood victims. In response to the floods, a youth-led initiative called "Nafeer" was founded to assist victims.

== See also ==
- 2007 Sudan floods
- 2018 Sudan floods
- 2020 Sudan floods
- 2022 Sudan floods
- 2024 Sudan floods
