= 2018 Sudan floods =

Natural disaster in Sudan

From July to November 2018, Sudan experienced extensive flooding due to extreme rainfall. The most affected states were Kassala, West Kordofan, and Khartoum. By August 16, at least 23 people had been killed and over 60 injured. By November 5, over 19,640 homes had been destroyed, and an estimated 222,275 people had been affected.

== See also ==
- 2007 Sudan floods
- 2013 Sudan floods
- 2020 Sudan floods
- 2022 Sudan floods
- 2024 Sudan floods
