= Floods in South Sudan =

Floods in South Sudan are a frequent occurrence, with the country's location in the Nile River Basin and its low-lying topography making it vulnerable to floods. They have been recorded in the country since the 1960s, and their impacts have become increasingly severe in recent years due to climate change and poor drainage infrastructure.

== Impacts ==
Floods have caused displacement and the loss of homes and personal belongings. Many schools have also been closed due to the floods. The floods have also destroyed crops, leading to food shortages and increased food prices. Livestock has also been impacted, with many animals being swept away by floodwaters.

== Ongoing 2024 floods ==
The 2024 South Sudan floods started in August 2024 and have been so catastrophic that some parts of the country have been under water for several years.

== See also ==
- Floods in Sudan
