= 2007 Sudan floods =

On 3 July 2007, flash floods during Sudan's rainy season devastated much of the country's central, southern, and western regions. The Sudanese government referred to the floods as the "worst in living memory".

An estimated 200,000 Sudanese were made homeless while 122 reportedly died. The United Nations played a principal role in the ensuing recovery and relief program.

== Damage ==
As of 12 August 2007, the emergency had caused the total or partial destruction of over 150,000 homes, leaving at least 750,000 homeless or in need of emergency shelter due to a destroyed home (according to an average of available estimates).

The areas worst affected were the states of Kassala, Khartoum, North Kurdufan, Unity State, and Upper Nile. The United Nations, whilst not providing specific figures for the devastation, estimates that "well over 30,000 houses" were fully destroyed, and "at least 365,000 people" have already been directly affected, including a reported 64 dead and 335 injured.

The United Nations reported on 19 August the following highlights:

- At least 257 schools destroyed, leaving over 56,000 children without primary education.
- At least 12,000 livestock, 16,000 chickens, and 96,000 feddans of crops lost.
- Outbreaks of waterborne disease continue in Gedaref and Kassala, killing one person every two weeks on average.

== Response ==
Within four weeks after torrential rains started to devastate many parts of the Sudan, the United Nations and partners, in support of the Government, have assisted up to half a million people affected by the floods. This includes aid of a preventive nature, designed to avert the huge risk of epidemics.

David Gressly, acting United Nations Resident Coordinator in the country, stated: "Although the floods came earlier than expected, the response has been swift and successful. We had contingency measures in place, and were able to prevent further distress to the population. [But] if current flooding patterns continue unabated, the situation will deteriorate considerably".

On 6 August 2007, the United Nations reported that the following had been achieved:

- The United Nations and partners have so far supplied essential non-food items to approximately 200,000 people, whose indispensable household goods were lost in the destruction. Families received badly needed commodities, such as blankets, pieces of plastic sheeting to serve as shelter, jerry cans for carrying and storing clean water, cooking sets, and sleeping mats. However, it is estimated that many more people will need similar relief over the coming months.
- Amidst the risk of waterborne epidemics, the lack of clean water has been a primary concern. In close cooperation with the Government, the United Nations and partners have so far provided water purification products and hygiene education to approximately 500,000 people without access to clean water, with over 1,400 kilograms of chlorine powder and 878,000 chlorine tablets already supplied. In Kassala near the Eritrean border, tankers have been delivering clean water to the most affected neighbourhoods, covering at least 10,000 people. Over the rest of the rainy season, clean water — potentially life-saving — will continue to be a priority need for hundreds of thousands.
- Despite these preventive measures, 637 cases of suspected acute watery diarrhoea were reported in the states of Gedaref and Kassala in Sudan's east, leading to 39 known deaths. Emergency epidemic surveillance measures have been put in place, along with pre-positioning of preventive and curative health supplies. Over 34,000 people in the affected areas have received cholera awareness education. In order to respond to the increased risk of potential diseases transmittable by insects, the United Nations and partners will endeavour to procure sufficient medical drugs, mosquito nets, insecticides, and other supplies, to cover all those in need until the emergency is over.
- So far, 40,000 flood victims have received food, but the United Nations estimates that many more could soon be in need of emergency food rations.

== Funding ==
On 16 August, the United Nations announced that an appeal for the floods would be forthcoming. The amount of the appeal, however, was not disclosed.

On 20 August 2007, the United Nations Office for the Coordination of Humanitarian Affairs announced that US$8.7 million had been allocated to the response, from its Central Emergency Response Fund (CERF). The statement also noted that US$3.8 million had already been allocated to the response from a local pooled fund.

The Resident Coordinator and Humanitarian Coordinator of the United Nations, Oluseyi Bajulaiye, then launched an appeal on 28 August to the international community, requesting US$20.2 million in funding for the ongoing response.

== See also ==
- 2013 Sudan floods
- 2018 Sudan floods
- 2020 Sudan floods
- 2022 Sudan floods
- 2024 Sudan floods
