= Oluseyi Bajulaiye =

United Nations official

Personal details
- Citizenship: Nigerian

Oluseyi Bajulaiye is a Nigerian diplomat. He is a senior United Nations official with a background in UNHCR activities dealing with refugees and humanitarian programs.

== Career ==
Since 2005, he is the Deputy Resident Coordinator and Humanitarian Coordinator in the Sudan. And following the departure of titular Resident Coordinator and Humanitarian Coordinator Manuel Aranda da Silva in June 2007, he has since that time been the acting Resident Coordinator and Humanitarian Coordinator - a function which also carries the title of Deputy Special Representative of the Secretary-General, and which is the highest United Nations post in the country, besides that of Special Representative of the Secretary-General Ashraf Qazi (nominated in September 2007, and previously vacant).

During his mandate in the Sudan, he was at the forefront in coordinating the United Nations response to the 2007 Sudan floods. In particular, he appealed to the international community to fund the response in an amount exceeding US$20 million.

In September 2007, he was also the official hosting the visit of United Nations Secretary-General Ban Ki-moon, and he helped ensure that the issues of humanitarian access and protection of civilians were on the agenda.

In 2018, Bajulaiye was appointed as a Member of the Board of Lagos State Teaching Hospital, Lagos, Nigeria.
