= Nafeer =

2013 Sudanese volunteer flood-relief initiative

Nafeer (Arabic: نفير) was a volunteer-led humanitarian initiative formed in Khartoum, Sudan, in August 2013 in response to severe flooding around the capital. Organised largely by young volunteers and coordinated through social media, the group provided emergency relief at a time when many residents and observers considered the official response inadequate. Commentators have identified it as a forerunner of the Emergency Response Rooms that emerged during the civil war that began in 2023.

== Background ==
Nafeer is a long-standing Sudanese tradition of collective action and mutual assistance, derived from an Arabic term commonly translated as "a call to mobilise" or "a call to collective action". Historically it described communities pooling labour and resources for tasks such as harvesting, housebuilding or responding to emergencies, and it features in Sudanese songs and oral traditions.

In late July and August 2013, unusually heavy rains caused the Nile and seasonal watercourses to overflow, submerging low-lying neighbourhoods in and around Khartoum. Estimates of those affected ranged around 180,000 people, with thousands of homes destroyed. Public anger grew over what critics described as an insufficient government response, and protests broke out in several flood-affected areas.

== Formation and activities ==
Nafeer was created on Facebook in early August 2013 and grew rapidly into a structured volunteer operation. According to one contemporary account, around 1,200 volunteers had registered within the initiative's first week. A later peer-reviewed case study described Nafeer as adopting a flat management structure divided into 14 committees, with a coordination committee liaising between them; specialised committees handled areas such as health and sanitation, engineering, volunteer training and surveys. Nafeer's activities included distributing food, delivering basic health care through mobile clinics, conducting environmental sanitation campaigns, raising public awareness, and building and reinforcing flood barricades.
