= Karari =

Karari करारी
- Town
- Location in Uttar Pradesh, India Karari (India)
- Coordinates: 25.45°N 81.43°E
- Country: India
- State: Uttar Pradesh
- District: Kaushambi
- Elevation: 95 m (312 ft)

Population (2001)
  - Total: 12,754

Languages
  - Official: Hindi
- Time zone: UTC+5:30 (IST)
- PIN: 212206
- Telephone code: 05331
- Vehicle registration: UP

Karrari also known as Karari करारी is a town and a nagar panchayat in Kaushambi district in the Indian state of Uttar Pradesh. The town has a predominantly rural demographic, with agriculture being the primary occupation of the residents. The population consists of a mix of various castes and communities, with a significant proportion belonging to the Scheduled Castes and Other Backward Classes. Overall, Karari Kaushambi is a typical rural town in India with a primarily agrarian economy and a diverse population.

== Demographics ==
As of 2011 India census, Karari had a population of 16,467. Males constitute 51.5% of the population, females 48.5% Karari has an average literacy rate of 72.2%, higher than state average of 67.7%: male literacy is 78.7%, and female literacy is 65.4%. In Karari, 15.5% of the population is under 6 years of age.

== Transport ==
Karari is situated about 45 km from Allahabad and 13 km from Bharwari railway station. It is near Chitrakut Dham, and the living place (Rajapur) of poet Tulsi Das, who had written immortal poetic book known as Shri Ram Charitra Manas. Karari can be reached through private bus from Allahabad railway station and lot of private Zeeps are available from Chauphatka (Allahabad).

== Schools and colleges ==
Karari is emerge as education hub for nearby areas there are following colleges—Dr. Rizvi Degree College, Dr. Rizvi College of law, Dr. Rizvi Engeeniering College, Karari Inter College, Riyaz Intermediate College, Allama Jawwadi Inter College, and Mother India Inter College. Riyaz intermediate college. United public school.

== Navagrah temple ==
Navagrah temple was built by Somnath Verma. It was opened to the public in 2017. Otherthan this temple there are many famous near by temples Agiyona Mata ji temple, Barambaba temple. Karari Ramleela and Bharat milap is famous and 3 days pre-diwali fair is the main attraction.
