= List of Rift Valley fever outbreaks =

Rift Valley fever (RVF) outbreaks affecting humans and livestock occur across sub-Saharan Africa, with outbreaks occurring elsewhere infrequently. Outbreaks usually correspond with the El Niño, associated with increased rainfall and flooding, causing increases in the mosquito population, which act as vector for the virus. The earliest documented outbreak was identified in livestock in Kenya in 1931, and RVF is believed to have been circulating in the country earlier in the 20th century. The first recorded human deaths occurred in 1974 in South Africa.

== Kenya, 1931 ==
While RVF may well have been circulating at least as early as 1912 or 1913 when along with a variety of other livestock diseases were described, a series of unexplained deaths were also described that had occurred in lambs in Kenya, the first documented outbreak was identified in Kenya in 1931. While the initial set of Kenyan cases in this 1931 outbreak were identified because of sudden death in a large number of lambs, the disease was also found in cattle as well as in humans including scientists, veterinarians, and farmers working with those animals leading to a total of over 5,000 deaths, all limited to livestock.

== Kenya, 1950–1951 ==
While no cases were reported in Kenya from 1936 to 1950, another severe outbreak in 1950 and 1951 resulted in 500,000 cases and 100,000 deaths in livestock and an undetermined numbers of humans with fever symptoms, but no human deaths.

== South Africa, 1974–1976 ==
After heavy rain and flooding in South Africa, a Rift Valley fever outbreak, which ultimately extended from 1974 to 1976, infected more than 500,000 animals. Significantly, during this outbreak, in 1974, the first human deaths were reported from the Rift Valley Fever Virus. In total during this outbreak, there were 110 human cases and seven deaths.

== Egypt, 1977–1979 ==
The first cases of Rift Valley fever recorded outside of sub-Saharan Africa were in an outbreak that began in Egypt in 1977. Livestock trade along the Nile irrigation system was blamed for its introduction. The fever may have been introduced via sheep that were imported from Sudan or imported from Zimbabwe. The outbreak lasted from 1977 to 1979 and significantly damaged the Egyptian economy resulting in, for the first time, a significant numbers of human deaths. In total, there were an estimated 200,000 people infected and at least 594 deaths.

== Kenya, 1997–1998 ==
From late October 1997 to early January 1998, Kenya received 60 to 100 times the normal rainfall resulting in an outbreak of Rift Valley fever. By early 1998, farmers reported deaths of as many as 70% of their sheep and goats and 20 to 30% of their cattle and camels. By 1998, reports were in that more than 400 people had died. Later estimates suggested that as many as 27,500 people were infected within a single district in Kenya, making it the largest outbreak in East Africa.

== Saudi Arabia and Yemen, 2000 ==
In 2000, there was an outbreak of Rift Valley fever in Saudi Arabia and Yemen again tied to excessive rainfall. Critically, this was the initial outbreak outside of the African continent, and was thought to have spread from the 1997-1998 Kenyan outbreak. The Saudi government blamed the problem on livestock imported from East Africa, and Saudi Arabia and other Gulf states placed a ban on imports from the region, which greatly affected East Africa's livestock sector. In animals, there were over 10,000 infected and 1,000 deaths in Saudi Arabia and 22,000 infections and 6,000 deaths in Yemen [KK]. In humans, there were 886 cases in Saudi Arabia and 1328 cases in Yemen with 123 and 166 deaths, respectively.

== Kenya and Somalia, 2006–2007 ==
In November 2006, a Rift Valley fever outbreak started in Kenya. The cases were from the North Eastern Province and Coast Province of Kenya, which had received heavy rain, causing floods and creating breeding grounds for mosquitoes, which spread the virus of the fever from infected livestock to humans.

By 7 January 2007, about 75 people had died and another 183 were infected. The outbreak forced the closure of livestock markets in the North Eastern Province, affecting the economy of the region.

The outbreak was subsequently reported to have moved into Maragua and Kirinyaga districts of Central Province of Kenya.

On 20 January 2007, the outbreak was reported to have crossed into Somalia from Kenya and killed 14 people in the Lower Jubba region.

As of 23 January 2007, cases had started to crop up at the Kenyan capital, Nairobi. Businesses were suffering large losses, as customers were shunning the common meat joints for the popular nyama choma (roast meat), as it was believed to be spreading the fever.

In December 2006 and again in January 2007, Taiwan International Health Action (Taiwan IHA) began operating missions in Kenya consisting of medical experts assisting in training laboratory and health facility personnel, and included donations of supplies, such as mosquito sprays. The United States Centers for Disease Control also set up an assistance mission and laboratory in Kenya.

By the end of January, 2007, some 148 people had died since the outbreak began in December.

On 14 March 2007, the Kenyan government declared RVF cases to be diminished after spending an estimated $2.5 million in vaccine and deployment costs. It also lifted the ban on cattle movement in the affected areas. The final death toll in this outbreak was more than 150 people.

However, on 8 June 2018, the Ministry of Health in Kenya declared another outbreak of RVF.

== Sudan, 2007 ==
As of 2 November 2007, 125 cases, including 60 deaths, had been reported from more than 10 localities of White Nile, Sinnar, and Gezira states in Sudan. Young adult males were predominantly affected. More than 25 human samples have been found positive for RVF by PCR or ELISA.

== Madagascar, 2008–2009 ==
During two consecutive seasons of heavy rains in 2008 and 2009, there were two separate outbreaks in Madagascar resulting in 712 suspected human cases and 26 deaths. Studies showed the Rift Valley fever virus strains found in Madagascar were similar to those found in the 2006-2007 outbreak in Kenya.

== South Africa, 2008–2011 ==
There were minor outbreaks in 2008 and 2009 in South Africa, followed by an extensive outbreak of infections in 2010. As of 8 April 2010, the Ministry of Health South Africa had reported 87 human cases infected with Rift Valley fever (RVF), including two deaths in Free State, Eastern Cape and Northern Cape provinces. Most of these cases reported direct contact with RVFV-infected livestock and or were linked to farms with confirmed animal cases of RVF. The human cases were among farmers, veterinarians and farm workers. All cases were confirmed with RVF by test conducted at the National Institute of Communicable Diseases (NICD) in Johannesburg, South Africa.

An outbreak of Rift Valley fever virus (RVFV) infection affected sheep, goats, cattle and wildlife on farms within Free State, Eastern Cape, Northern Cape, Western Cape, Mpumalanga, North West, and Gauteng provinces. As of 29 March 2010, about 78 farms reported laboratory-confirmed animal cases, with extensive livestock deaths.

By 2011, at least 20,000 animal infections and 8,851 deaths, and 302 human infections and 25 deaths had been reported.

Before this outbreak, sporadic cases of RVFV infection in animals had been documented in South Africa. The last major outbreak of the disease in humans occurred between 1974 and 1976, where an estimated 10,000 to 20,000 cases were recorded.

== France, 2011 ==
On 19 October 2011, a case of Rift Valley fever contracted in Zimbabwe was reported in a Caucasian female traveler who returned to France after a 26-day stay in Marondera, Mashonaland East Province during July and August, 2011 but later classified as "not confirmed."

== Mauritania, 2012 ==
In September, 2012, there was a human case of Rift Valley fever reported in southern Mauritania. There were a total of 34 cases reported including 17 deaths, and in each case, there was documented contact between the identified cases and animals.

== Niger, 2016 ==
The first outbreak of Rift Valley fever in Niger occurred in 2016, with a total of as many as 266 suspected human cases, and included significant loss of cattle as well as 33 human deaths including 17 that were confirmed cases.

== Uganda, 2016, 2018, 2019 ==
In March 2016, a male butcher from Kabale District in western Uganda reported to a local hospital with symptoms of headache, fever, fatigue and bleeding, subsequently testing positive for Rift Valley fever. The CDC sent epidemiologists to the District to assist the Ugandan Ministry of Health with the epidemiologic investigation of this small, localized outbreak of 3 confirmed and 2 probable cases. Working with the Uganda Virus Research Institute (UVRI) and the Uganda Ministry of Health, the CDC team conducted a serologic study in animals and humans and also assessed residents’ knowledge, attitudes, and practices related to Rift Valley Fever. The team collected samples from cows, goats and sheep, and interviewed and tested 650 district residents. A coordinated educational campaign targeting the general population, farmers, herders, and butchers was initiated and informational posters were created targeting these groups.

In January 2018, three human cases of RVF were confirmed in three separate Ugandan districts. By July 2018, an outbreak was declared with 6 confirmed cases and 3 deaths in 5 different districts. By September 2018, an additional 19 people had died with many of the deaths blamed on eating infected livestock.

In December 2019, 2 human deaths in two different regions of Uganda were reported.

== Kenya, 2018–2019 ==
On 3 June 2018, an outbreak of Rift Valley fever began in northern Kenya, and by 6 June 2018, there were 26 suspected human cases including 6 deaths in Wajir County (24 cases) and Marsabit County (2 cases); 7 cases had been confirmed. There were also numerous deaths and abortions in camels, goats and other livestock across a wider area of the country. Despite vaccination of 250,000 livestock in the first two weeks of July, by 12 Jul 2018, there were 120 human cases reported with at least ten deaths. While multiple cattle markets were closed and plans were underway to vaccinate an additional 70,000 cattle, by August, 2018, 500 livestock had died. In July and August alone, there were ten outbreaks reported in livestock and/or humans, and by the end of 2018, 26 people had died.

A smaller outbreak, caused by contact with infected animals while grazing or drinking, began in cattle and sheep in January, 2019, followed by several human cases.

== Mayotte, 2018–2019 ==
An outbreak of Rift Valley Virus in the French Mayotte Islands, part of the Comoro group off Mozambique, began with the first human case showing symptoms on 22 November 2018. The outbreak led to restrictions on the sale of uncooked milk, as well as the sale and export of cattle and uncooked meat. While the WHO noted that mosquito transmission should have decreased as the rainy season ended in April, rain provided by Cyclone Kenneth prolonged the outbreak, and the last reported case did not occur until August, 2019. During the outbreak, there were a total of 143 confirmed human cases, as well as 126 cases in livestock.

== Central African Republic and Sudan, 2019–2020 ==
On 5 August 2019, the first confirmed human case ever of RVF in Bangui, Central African Republic, was identified; seven additional potentially infected individuals were also identified. Heavy rains leading to massive flooding from August through October 2019, led to spread of the disease including to Eastern Africa, and, in September 2019, three suspected cases appeared in three separate regions of Sudan with 44 additional cases by 10 October 2019 including 2 deaths.

In Sudan, by mid-November, 2019, there were 293 suspected RVF cases identified in humans, including 11 deaths, and more than 75 sheep and goats, including 12 deaths. Massive vaccination efforts extending to 120,000 cattle, goats, and sheep, in neighboring Egypt prevented spread into that country.

== Libya, 2019–2020 ==
Likely because of illegally transporting of infected animals, a small animal outbreak began in Libya in mid-December 2019 and was ongoing in 2020 with 30 cases and 4 deaths. As of 22 October 2020, no human infections were reported.

== Mauritania and Sudan, 2020 ==
In an ongoing outbreak, as of 1 October 2020, three deaths have been reported by the Mauritanian government. In an ongoing outbreak in Sudan, as of 15 October 2020, there have been 79 deaths and 1,962 cases reported from Rift Valley fever.

== Kenya 2020–2021 ==
An outbreak started in Sericho, Isiolo county in Kenya on around 19 November 2020, and was confirmed in December. As of 4 February 2021, there have been 32 cases in humans (14 confirmed) in Isiolo and Mandera, of whom 11 have died. Many of the cases have been among herders and other people who work with livestock, and the disease has also affected livestock, including sheep, goats and camels, in Isiolo, Mandera, Murang'a and Garissa. The outbreak appears to be associated with flooding of the Dawa and Ewaso rivers. It is ongoing as of February 2021.
