= 2020 Sudan floods =

Floods within Sudan caused by rainfall

Sudan floods
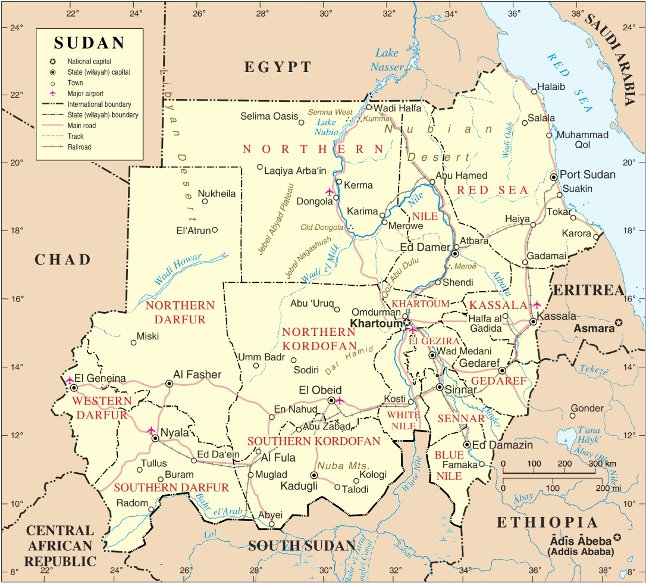
- Map of Sudan from 2011
- Date: September 2020 – 15 November 2020
- Location: Sudan
- Deaths: about 100-500 deaths and over 50 injuries
- Property damage: LS243.4 billion (US$4.43 billion)

In September 2020, profuse and continuous rainfall in Sudan caused a devastating flood across 17 out of the 18 states Sudanese states with the Blue Nile reaching water levels not seen for nearly a century. It ranks among the most severe floods recorded in the region. A state of emergency was declared, and teams have worked to prevent damage to threatened archaeological sites. The flood affected more than 3,000,000 people, destroyed more than 100,000 homes, and left more than 100 people dead . Total damage of the flood was estimated at LS243.4 billion (US$4.43 billion).

== Event ==
The water level of the Nile River in Sudan rose and reached record levels, as floods entered homes and destroyed about 100,000 homes, and caused about 100 deaths. The level of the Blue Nile reached more than 17 metres, breaking all records. Floods caused by torrential monsoon rains mostly outside the country in neighbouring Ethiopia raised the Nile River by 17.5 metres (57 ft) in late August, the highest level it has reached in nearly a century, according to the Sudanese Ministry of Irrigation. For the first time in history, the Pyramids of Meroë were threatened by flooding.

The rates of floods and rain exceeded the records set in 1946 and 1988. Some experts, such as International Rivers, expect climate change to cause periodic bouts of drought and flooding in the future. As of April 2023, the farmlands are still flooded as the water hasn't receded.

== Response ==
The government led and coordinated the emergency response to the flood. The National Flood Mission Forces of the Humanitarian Aid Committee began, and Prime Minister Abdalla Hamdok confirmed that "the levels of the Nile and its tributaries this year, according to the Ministry of Irrigation and Water Resources, have been unprecedented since 1912." He also pointed out that this year's floods resulted in tragic and painful losses of life and property.

=== State of emergency ===
The Sudanese Security and Defense Council declared a state of emergency throughout the country for a period of three months and has decided to consider Sudan a natural disaster area. The council has formed a supreme committee to prevent and address the effects of torrents and floods, which killed about 100 people and flooded more than 100 thousand homes since late July.

The floodwaters may overrun and flood an ancient archaeological site in the country. Teams have organized sandbag walls and are pumping water out of the area in order to avoid damage to the ruins of Al-Bajrawiya, formerly an ancient city of the two-thousand-year-old Meroitic empire and a UNESCO World Heritage Site. Previous floods have never affected the site before.

The floods have thus far affected more than 500,000 people in at least 16 states across the country. This has left thousands of people homeless. Tents have been put up to accommodate the displaced in Sudan's capital, Khartoum.

Water-borne diseases have rapidly increased since the floods. Fever, diarrhea, and stomach infections are rampant as a result of dirty drinking water. Sudan was facing a health crisis even before the flood emergency. Pharmacies have been reporting shortages of medicine, and many hospitals lack adequate equipment.

The United Nations has increased food aid to the country while hundreds of thousands of Sudanese have been forced to live in desperate makeshift camps. The situation has been aggravated by the country's economic crisis and political deadlock. The government announced a public emergency after its currency abruptly declined in recent weeks. Prices of basic foods such as bread and sugar have risen in price by over 50 percent over the past few weeks.

In September 2020, Sudanese Economic Minister Hiba Mohamed Ali said that the government had dedicated $6.15 million to help alleviate victims of the floods. Furthermore, less than half of the $1.6 billion needed for the country's humanitarian relief plan has been funded thus far.

The United Nations said humanitarian actors might run out of funds necessary to continue operations. The country is fighting multiple catastrophes, including warfare and an upsurge of COVID-19 and polio cases. The worst-hit states were North Darfur, Khartoum, Blue Nile, West Darfur and Sennar. In addition, vast areas of arable land in the affected states are flooded. The damage to farms could endanger food security, particularly in Khartoum, where over 1.4 million people are in desperate need of food.

On 30 September 2020, the Food and Agriculture Organization said that the floods in Sudan have affected nearly one third of cultivated land and about 3 million people from agricultural households. About 2.2 million hectares of cropland has been flooded and 108,000 head of livestock lost, according to an FAO assessment. Some 1.1 million tonnes of grain was destroyed in planted areas, most of it sorghum, a staple in Sudan, it added. Women from some of the nearly 600,000 affected agricultural households told the FAO they were cutting down to one small meal per day after their sorghum was washed away just before harvest. Commercial crops including bananas and mangos have also been badly hit. The floods have also destroyed or damaged tens of thousands of homes. The United Nations High Commissioner for Refugees said they have affected about 150,000 refugees and displaced people. The United Nations estimates that 9.6 million people face acute food insecurity in Sudan, the highest number on record.

In addition, the UN said that severe flooding in South Sudan has forced more than 600,000 people to flee their homes since July.

== See also ==
- 2007 Sudan floods
- 2013 Sudan floods
- 2018 Sudan floods
- 2022 Sudan floods
- 2024 Sudan floods
