= 2024 South Sudan floods =

Natural disaster in Africa

- Date: August 2024 – ongoing
- Location: South Sudan
- Cause: Heavy rainfall, overflow of Lake Victoria
- Deaths: Unknown: 735,000 people impacted; 65,000 people displaced

The 2024 South Sudan floods refer to catastrophic flooding across the African nation of South Sudan, resulting in "over 735,000 people across 38 of South Sudan’s 78 counties and the Abyei Administrative Area" being directly impacted, and 65,000 people being displaced, of which 41,000 were displaced from Warrap.

Climate researchers theorized that altered climate patterns around the Sudd wetland region could result in the first mass-population displacement caused by climate change, due to the permanent expansion of uninhabitable wetlands caused by prolonged rainfall and flooding.

== Flooding ==
Beginning in August 2024, significant rainfall across eastern Africa caused Lake Victoria to reach record water levels, resulting in a significant flow of water on the Nile downstream towards South Sudan. This, coupled with heavy rainfall across South Sudan, resulted in significant flooding across much of South Sudan. Sudd Institute senior environmental researcher Tiit Mamar stated that the water levels of Lake Victoria reached between 13.44 meters and 13.60 meters in part due to El Niño.

Significant flooding occurred in the vast wetland area of the Sudd, where the Nile branches into a complex network of smaller waterways, swamps, and floodplains. Its geography creates distinctive annual flooding patterns that are dramatically influenced by water levels in Lake Victoria. In addition, the region's composition of silt and clay make water infiltration into the soil difficult, while floodwaters in the Sudd do not easily drain back into the White Nile's main channel. These together make flooding in the Sudd region persist for relatively prolonged periods that require long-term evaporation for water levels to recede.

== Impact ==
Prolonged flooding resulted in at least 735,000 South Sudanese civilians being impacted. Of these, 65,000 civilians were displaced, of which over 41,000 people in Warrap and 10,375 more in Jonglei State were among them. The flooding greatly exacerbated existing humanitarian crises caused by regional hostilities in addition to the inflow of refugees from Sudan caused by the concurrent Sudanese Civil War. Many flood-impacted areas were affected by outbreaks of hunger due to destruction of farmland and food supplies. These areas also suffered from disease outbreaks including malaria caused by standing water creating breeding grounds for vectors of infection and waterborne illnesses, in addition to increased animal attacks.

Since mid-August, 3,600 displaced citizens that arrived to Upper Nile from New Fangak in Jonglei State, with 1,000 households (6,000 people) from Nasir County also displaced. 20,000 people (5,700 households) were displaced from Jur River County, which had 147,750 fedans of agricultural land reported as submerged. National reports stated that 21,863 citizens in Mayendit County were displaced, with eleven of thirteen of its payams impacted by flooding. In addition, 4,275 hectares of farmland were submerged.

=== Sudd ===
Flooding was unprecedented in South Sudan's Sudd region, which holds one of the world's largest wetlands. As a result, significant amounts of local communities in the region were displaced. As a result of unprecedented flooding amounts and durations, indigenous communities of the Sudd which include the Anuak, Dinka, Shilluk, and Nuer people, were unable to adapt using traditional flood-prevention measures such as moving farm animals to higher ground or protecting infrastructure with compressed earth walls. As a result, many civilians in the region were internally displaced and forced to live in refugee camps.

Climate researchers theorized that new weather patterns causing greater rainfall and flooding could in turn result in the expansion of the inhabitable wetland areas in the Sudd, potentially resulting in the first permanent mass-population displacement caused by climate change.

== Response ==
The United Nations Central Emergency Response Fund administered $10 million to assist roughly 700,000 citizens impacted by flooding in the Aweil East, Mayiandit, Fangak, Rubkona, and Nasir counties. The South Sudan Humanitarian Fund added $5 million to the amount in order to provide further critical humanitarian services.

Flood damage and submerging of roads impeded the delivery of humanitarian aid, forcing agencies to transport supplies with costlier air and river means of transportation. In addition, frequent snakebites with no available anti-venom resulted in several fatalities within Lafon County in Eastern Equatoria.

== See also ==
- 2024 Sudan floods
- 2024 West African floods
