= Forestry in Sudan =

Forestry in Sudan includes both traditional gatherers of firewood and producers of charcoal—the main sources of fuel for homes and some industries—and a modern timber and sawmilling industry, the latter government-owned. Forestry activities started with Condominium rule in 1899, when the government commissioned an Indian forester to produce a comprehensive report on the state of forests in the country. As a result, the Woods and Forests Ordinance was published in 1901, and the Department of Woodlands and Forests established. The First Forest Act replaced the ordinance in 1908, and legislation continued to evolve over the next century.

The Forests National Corporation (FNC) has coordinated forestry development in Sudan since 1989. The FNC emphasizes the development of a forestry information system and planning database for effective planning, policy analysis, and program implementation.

Extensive areas of woodland and forest have been converted to agricultural use since the early 1900s. In 2000, however, Sudan still had a large quantity of natural forest, much of which remained almost totally unexploited. The UN Food and Agriculture Organization estimated that forest areas, defined as land under natural or planted stands of trees, whether productive or not, occupied 61.6 million hectares, 25.9 percent of the total land area. Extensive as this was, it represented a loss of nearly 10 million hectares since 1990.

About one quarter of the forestland is located in the dry and semi-arid regions of northern Sudan. The main value of these forests is as protection for the land against desertification, but they also serve as a source of fuel for pastoral peoples in those regions. The continued population pressure on the land has resulted in accelerated destruction of forestland, particularly in the Sahel, because charcoal remains the predominant fuel. The loss of forestland in the marginal areas of northern Sudan, accelerated by mechanized farming and by drought, has resulted in the steady southward encroachment of the Sahara.

The productive forest extends below the zone of desert encroachment to the nation's southern borders. It includes the savanna woodlands of the central and western parts of the country, which are dominated by various species of acacia, among them Acacia senegal, the principal source of gum arabic.

The principal area of productive forest and woodland is in the more moist southern part of the country. The southern zone consisting of broadleaf deciduous hardwoods remains largely undeveloped. Timber produced by government mills in the area includes mahogany for furniture and other hardwoods for railroad ties, furniture, and construction.

Plantations established by the Forestry Administration include stands of teak. Eucalyptus stands were established in the irrigated agricultural areas as windbreaks and to supply firewood. Several national parks and game reserves offered some protection of forest and woodland areas.

The second civil war of 1983-2005 disrupted forestry production in the South. During that time, looting of teak plantations, deforestation, and forest degradation occurred around major towns in Equatoria and Bahr al-Ghazal to a radius of 5-10 kilometers as people sought land for subsistence agriculture and for building poles and fuelwood. Along the northern border region of Upper Nile, there was large-scale tree clearance for mechanized rain-fed agriculture. However, the total impact of the civil strife on forests and wildlife was not known for certain, as surveys did not cover the areas affected by hostilities.

In 1999–2001, Sudan annually produced 2,173,000 cubic meters of industrial roundwood, and 16,700,000 cubic meters of fuelwood, as well as 52,000 cubic meters of wood-based panels, and three tonnes of paper and paperboard. There was continued high demand for charcoal, the one major forest product not dependent on the South. Because wood of any kind could be turned into charcoal, the acacia groves of the Sahel were used extensively for this purpose, with a resulting rapid advance of deforestation in the area. Deforestation throughout the country was occurring at an unsustainable rate approaching 2 percent a year in the early 2000s, especially in the northern states and in Darfur.

== REDD+ reference levels and monitoring ==
Under the UNFCCC REDD+ framework, Sudan has submitted both subnational and national reference-level benchmarks. On the UNFCCC REDD+ Web Platform, the 2020 submission for Blue Nile, Gedarif and Sinnar states and the 2025 national submission are both listed as having assessed reference levels. Both packages list a national strategy, while safeguards information and a national forest monitoring system are listed as "not reported".

The first assessed submission, technically assessed in 2021, was a subnational forest reference level (FRL) covering reducing emissions from deforestation and enhancement of forest carbon stocks in Blue Nile, Gedarif and Sinnar states. Using a 2006-2018 reference period, the original submission proposed 441,744 t CO2 eq per year, revised during the technical assessment to an assessed FRL of 935,057 t CO2 eq per year. The technical assessment states that it included above-ground biomass and below-ground biomass, reported CO2 only, and used a forest definition of at least 0.4 hectares, 10 percent canopy cover and trees at least 2 metres tall.

A second, national submission, technically assessed in 2026, covered reducing emissions from deforestation, reducing emissions from forest degradation and enhancement of forest carbon stocks. Using a 2012-2021 reference period, the assessed benchmarks were 9,317,358 t CO2 eq per year for deforestation, 1,678,433 t CO2 eq per year for forest degradation, and -2,112,017 t CO2 eq per year for enhancement of forest carbon stocks. The technical assessment states that they included above-ground biomass, below-ground biomass and standing deadwood, reported CO2 only, and used the same forest definition of at least 0.4 hectares, 10 percent canopy cover and trees at least 2 metres tall.
