= Unregistered Lands Act =

The Unregistered Lands Act of 1970 was a Sudan legislation. The law stipulated that all lands not privately owned and registered would automatically belong to the state. The law effectively abolished communal land ownership under customary practices and was known as the "terror" for most of the society. Although mostly Muslim, Darfur is not an Arab region; this plays a role in the ethnic based conflicts. The various ethnic groups have different ways of land tenure systems. Some with special allocations for local groups and others with outsiders getting access to the land by paying rent, the rent collected is often shared amongst the landholding families. With the development of the acacia gum, the collection of rents became popularised over the land. Millet and sorghum grains were often used by farming communities in Darfur. This is because they were and still are staple crops, however, the risk of crop failure was always there, due to drought and pest. Therefore, alternative income possibilities were important, mostly for their livestock, but also for the other agricultural crops as well as gathering fruits, seeds and roots from plants. Studies have shown that about half of man's labour and most of women's labour was taken up with millets and sorghums during difficult seasons. This became a major problem in cultivation and other activities that were engaged in. The round of cultivated plots was an important characteristic as no fertilizer was available, but due to population increase people were forced to stay longer on the land, this created degradation. Land rotation was common in earlier times, increasing population pressure has led to situations in which people cultivated their plots more often. Conflict over land soon became politicised by the 1970 Unregistered Lands Act. The act was a Sudanese legislation, it was made to stipulate that all lands that were not privately owned and registered would directly belong to the state
