= 2024 Sudan floods =

Natural disaster during the 2023-4 Sudanese civil war

- Date: 24 July 2024–ongoing
- Location: Kassala State, Gezira State, East Darfur, North Kordofan
- Cause: Heavy rainfall
- Deaths: 68+
- Injuries: 7+
- Property damage: 12,000+ houses destroyed or damaged; 198,000 feddans (~205,500 acres) of farmland damaged; 44,000+ displaced

In 2024, the North African country of Sudan experienced flooding caused by heavy rainfall. Flooding beginning in July caused the deaths of at least twelve people, with seven more people injured and at least 12,506 people in total affected.

Flooding during 2024 was significant due to its concurrence with the Sudanese civil war and its resulting humanitarian crisis causing the internal displacement of millions of Sudanese citizens, exacerbating the damages caused by the floods to already-vulnerable populations.

== Background ==
As of late-March 2024, an estimated 7.2 million Sudanese citizens were internally displaced as a result of nationwide conflict and war crimes committed during the Sudanese civil war beginning in 2023. The International Organization for Migration (IOM) reported that all of Sudan's 18 states experienced displacement, with most refugees coming from the Sudanese capital of Khartoum, which accounted for "about 69 percent of the total number of displaced people, followed by West Darfur with more than 17 percent".

The vulnerability of displaced citizens was especially prominent in the Darfur region, where attacks on hospitals, widespread looting, and blockades on several cities preventing the delivery of humanitarian aid and other resources caused major shortages of medical supplies and food.

== Meteorology ==
The Intergovernmental Authority on Development (IGAD) Climate Prediction and Applications Centre (ICPAC) predicted that from 24 July to 31 July, an estimated 13.4 million Sudanese people in the Eastern and Western regions of Sudan would face "exceptionally heavy rainfall". The ICPAC's Disaster Operations Centre (DOC) issued warnings in these regions and especially in Kassala, urging civilians to relocate to higher ground. The center noted that insufficient maintenance of the banks and tributaries of the Mereb River, as well as of water channels in Kassala would greatly worsen the amount of flooding and damage to infrastructure caused by the heavy rainfall.

The Kassala Meteorological Department recorded that 118 mm (4.6 in) of rain fell in Kassala, 95 mm (3.7 in) fell in Wad Sheriffe, and 74 mm (2.9 in) fell in Gharb Kassala on 25 to 26 July, which were the highest rainfall amounts in several years for each region.

== Impact ==
From 23 to 25 July 2024, the IOM reported that storms across North Darfur produced heavy rainfall, causing flooding that destroyed roughly 1,018 houses in the town of Zamzam located in the Al-Fashir locality, displacing their households. 149 houses suffered partial damage, and 816 latrines were destroyed. The Zamzam Internally Displaced Persons Camp was primarily affected by the flooding.

Flooding in Kassala State affected 10,180 people or more, of whom most were displaced citizens that recently arrived from Sennar State, and were located at five reception centers in the Gharb Kassala locality. Many of the impacted were shelterless and lived next to roads, rendering them more susceptible to flooding and water-borne illnesses. The flooding damaged several water, sanitation, and hygiene facilities, and submerged roads and displacement tents. At least five deaths were reported in the region, three of whom drowned in the Mereb River, and one child dying at an IDP camp. Flooding also impacted people in the Reifi Kassala, Shamal Al Delta, Aroma, and Gharb Kassala localities. Many displacement shelters were heavily flooded due to not having drains installed and due to flooded latrines, destroying and contaminating food, blankets, clothes, and many other essential supplies.

Flooding on 25 to 26 July displaced roughly 500 people and destroyed 100 houses in Aroma town located in the Reifi Aroma locality. On 26 July, 85 houses were "completely destroyed" and 35 more were "partially destroyed" in Al Koma, while twenty-two houses were destroyed and thirteen more partially so in Ghibash village, displacing about 107 households in the Al Koma locality altogether.

On 13 August 2024, Sudan's Interior Ministry reported that at least 68 people have been killed due to extensive flooding, and called the floods the worst in the nation since 2019. At least 44,000 civilians were displaced by the flooding since 1 July. Over 12,000 houses and 198,000 feddans of farmland (~205,500 acres) were damaged or destroyed due to the floods.

== See also ==
- List of Sudan floods
- 2007 Sudan floods
- 2013 Sudan floods
- 2020 Sudan floods
- 2022 Sudan floods
- 2024 South Sudan floods
