= Sudan Humanitarian Aid Commission =

Sudan humanitarian Agency

Humanitarian Aid Commission (HAC) is the Governmental body that managed and organized all humanitarian work carried on in Sudan along with the Ministry of Humanitarian Affairs.

== History and development ==
Sudan first established unit to organized and facilitate Humanitarian Aid in 1985 When Sudan experienced major drought in 1984.

== Laws and agreements ==
Humanitarian Aid Commission (HAC) is the regulating body working under the Sudanese law.

Laws organizing the humatiraian organization then developed

HAC organize the International Organization work in Sudan by the Technical agreements and Country Agreements. HAC also monitor and insure the enforcing of laws concerning the composition and operation of local and international NGOs, as well as UN agents and other multilateral aid agencies.

== Role during the civil war ==
Since the outbreak of the civil war in April 2023, the HAC has operated under the Sudanese Armed Forces (SAF) and overseen the work of aid agencies in government-held areas. Humanitarian organisations and the UN have accused it of obstructing aid delivery through bureaucratic requirements, fees, and demands that HAC staff accompany aid missions. In territory it controls, the Rapid Support Forces established a parallel body, the Sudan Agency for Relief and Humanitarian Operations (SARHO), on 13 August 2023.
