= Social crisis =

Situation causing mass societal disruption

A social crisis (or alternately a societal crisis) is a crisis in which the basic structure of a society experiences some drastic interruption or decline.

== Overview ==
A social crisis can be sudden and immediate, or it can be some gross societal inequity which might take decades to develop, or it could be a wide range of scenarios or situations which fall somewhere between those conceptual modes. This can include

- a political crisis such as a coup d'etat, or mass civil disorder, due to political and/or social disorder, due to military conflict, or mass protests, or dysfunction within any part of or the central body of government.
- an economic crisis which can range from or include a possible financial crisis, currency crisis, or any economic shock, or any breakdown or major dysfunctions within the economic system,
- or a major upheaval due to a natural disaster, which can include severe weather, or epidemics, or drought, or famine, or other events related to the natural world.

A social crisis can consist of one, some, or all of these factors, in any combination.

== See also ==
- Civil disorder
- Financial crisis
- Societal collapse
