= David Gressly =

American humanitarian

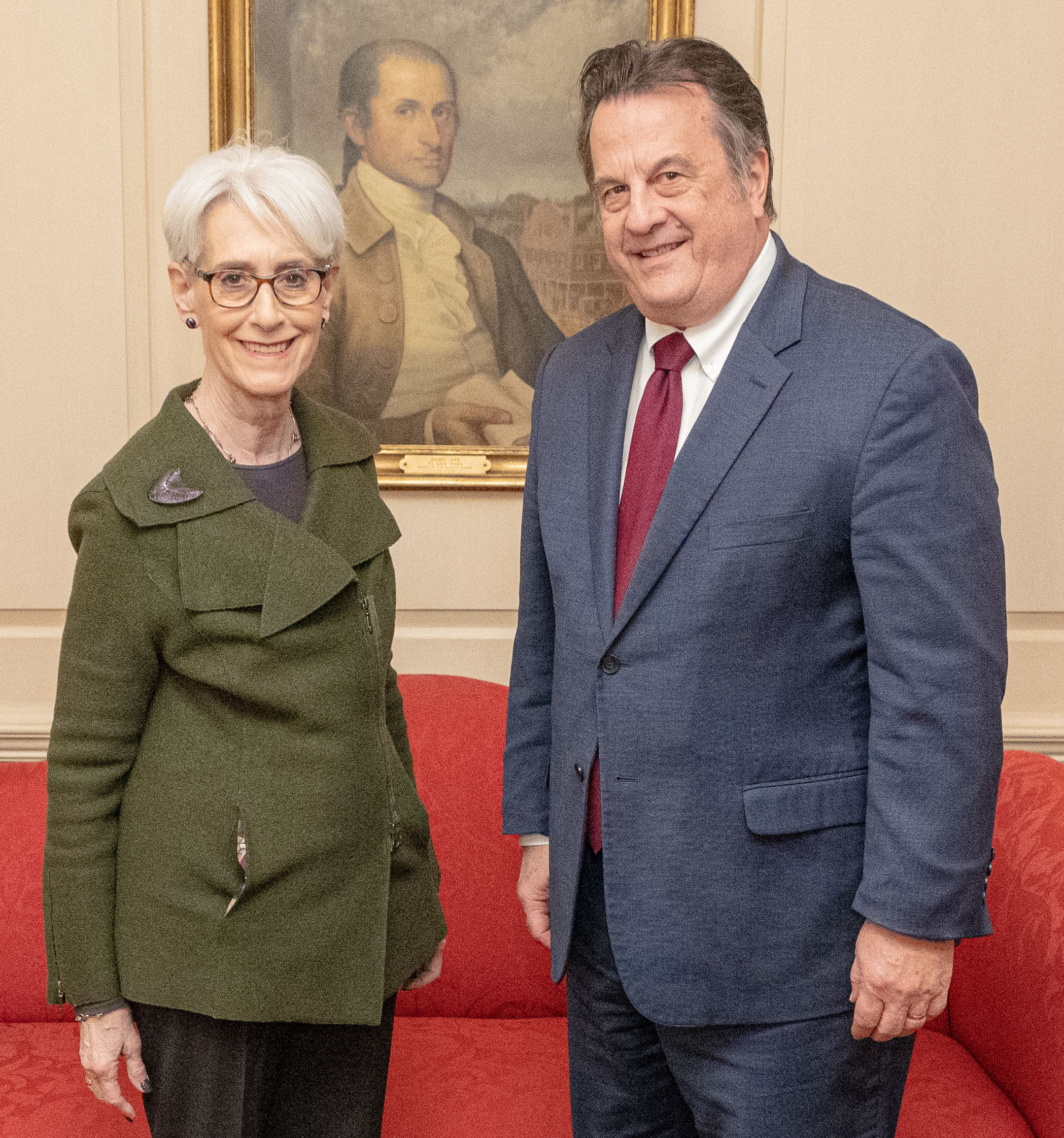
Gressly with US Deputy Secretary of State Wendy Sherman in 2022

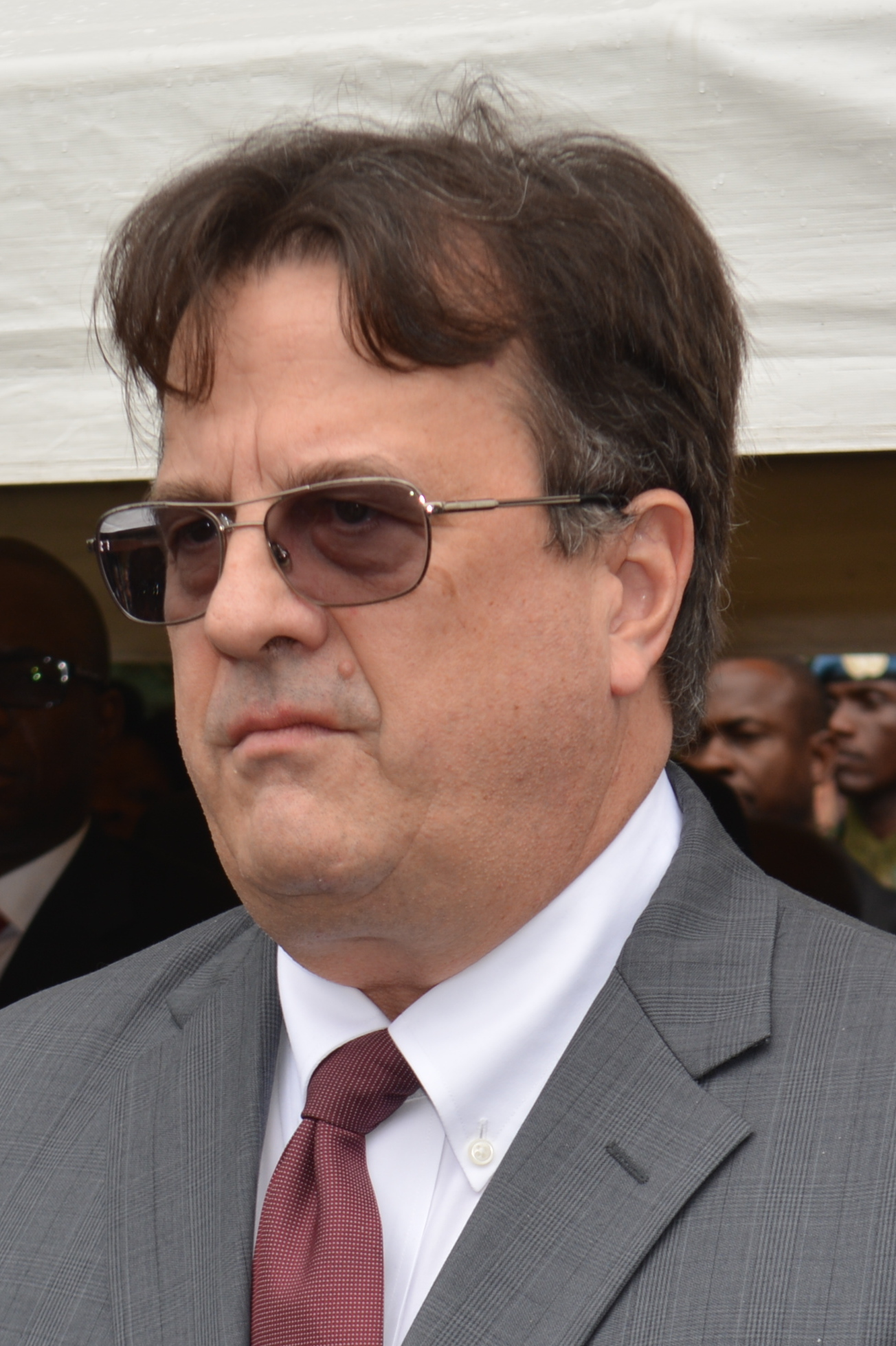
David Gressly in 2015

David Gressly was the United Nations Resident Coordinator / Humanitarian Coordinator for Yemen Prior to that he was the United Nations Deputy Special Representative for the Democratic Republic of the Congo. He also previously served as Deputy Special Representative in the United Nations Multidimensional Integrated Stabilization Mission in Mali (MINUSMA).

== Biography ==
Previously, he has served as Regional Humanitarian Coordinator for Sahel (RHC) by USG Valerie Amos since April 2012. His role is to oversee the response at the regional level and ensure coherence of efforts across countries.

Gressly's responsibilities included coordinating the humanitarian response to the Sahel crisis and providing support and advice to the UN Resident Coordinators and Humanitarian Coordinators at the country level. He was also responsible for the coordination and cooperation with development actors to reinforce the resilience of affected people, and for bridging the gap between the emergency humanitarian response and longer-term development activities. The RHC also has an advocacy role in mobilizing funding.

Prior to this appointment, Mr. Gressly was the UNICEF Regional Director in West and Central Africa, responsible for UNICEF operations in the region’s 24 countries with over US$800 million in annual programs.

He also served as UN Regional Coordinator for Southern Sudan for the UN peacekeeping mission from 2008 to 2011. He was responsible for coordinating the political and security support to the Southern Sudan Government, including support for the census, elections, referendum on self-determination, mediation support with armed groups, security-sector reform and support to the police.

From 2004 to 2008, Mr. Gressly was the Deputy Resident and Humanitarian Coordinator responsible for Southern Sudan. Immediately after the signing of the 2005 Comprehensive Peace Agreement, he moved the UN out of Nairobi into Southern Sudan. He also established the Capacity-Building Trust Fund, Common Humanitarian Fund and The Southern Sudan Recovery Fund to provide coordinated humanitarian, recovery and development support to the newly established Government of Southern Sudan. He provided mediation support to the LRA peace talks from 2006 to 2008.

During this period, the UN helped 2 million people return home to South Sudan; constructed over 2,000 km of roads; surveyed and cleared 14,000 km of roads of mines; worked with the new Government to reduce under age 5 mortality from 250 per 1,000 life births to 145; and increased school enrollment from 300,000 to 1.3 million.

In addition, Mr. Gressly was the UNICEF Deputy Representative in India, Representative in Guinea, Regional Operations Officer for West Africa, and Operations Officer in Nigeria.

Prior to joining UNICEF, Mr. Gressly worked in Washington, D.C. as the Director of Planning and Budget for the US Peace Corps. He was also the Peace Corps Country Director in Mauritania and began his career as a Peace Corps volunteer in Kenya, working in cooperative management.

Mr. Gressly holds an MBA from Thunderbird School of International Management and a BSc in Economics from University of Missouri, USA.

Married with six children, Mr. Gressly is an American citizen.
