= Manuel Aranda da Silva =

Mozambican diplomat

Manuel Jorge Aranda da Silva, a national of Mozambique, is a former minister in the Mozambican Government, and a former senior United Nations official with a background in the World Food Programme.

In 2004, he was appointed to serve as United Nations Resident Coordinator and Humanitarian Coordinator in the Sudan, thereby becoming the most senior United Nations official in the country, in charge of humanitarian aid and development besides the political Special Representative of the Secretary-General, a function then covered by Jan Pronk.

During his mandate, Mr. Aranda da Silva was notable for pushing forward the 2006 Darfur peace process, which he saw essential in light of humanitarian imperatives.

Although he maintained good relations with the Government of Sudan (and did not become persona non grata as happened to SRSG Jan Pronk), he was very outspoken, whenever the Government violated its agreements and commitments in terms of humanitarian access.
