= 1988 Sudan floods =

Natural disaster in Sudan

In early August 1988, severe floods struck Khartoum, the capital of Sudan. On August 4, the Khartoum area received 8.4 inches (210 mm) of rain in 24 hours, more than twice the usual annual rainfall. Heavy rains also fell on August 11 and 13. The rains and subsequent ground flooding destroyed an estimated 127,000 dwellings that had housed approximately 750,000 inhabitants (most of whom had previously been displaced from elsewhere in Sudan). In addition, food and water supplies, sanitation, transportation, and communications were seriously disrupted. Eighty people died in the flooding.
