= 2020 =

2020 in various calendars
- Gregorian calendar: 2020; MMXX
- Ab urbe condita: 2773
- Armenian calendar: 1469; ԹՎ ՌՆԿԹ
- Assyrian calendar: 6770
- Baháʼí calendar: 176–177
- Balinese saka calendar: 1941–1942
- Bengali calendar: 1426–1427
- Berber calendar: 2970
- British Regnal year: 68 Eliz. 2 – 69 Eliz. 2
- Buddhist calendar: 2564
- Burmese calendar: 1382
- Byzantine calendar: 7528–7529
- Chinese calendar: 己亥年 (Earth Pig); 4717 or 4510 — to — 庚子年 (Metal Rat); 4718 or 4511
- Coptic calendar: 1736–1737
- Discordian calendar: 3186
- Ethiopian calendar: 2012–2013
- Hebrew calendar: 5780–5781
- Hindu calendars
- Vikram Samvat: 2076–2077
- Shaka Samvat: 1941–1942
- Kali Yuga: 5120–5121
- Holocene calendar: 12020
- Igbo calendar: 1020–1021
- Iranian calendar: 1398–1399
- Islamic calendar: 1441–1442
- Japanese calendar: Reiwa 2 (令和２年)
- Javanese calendar: 1953–1954
- Juche calendar: 109
- Julian calendar: Gregorian minus 13 days
- Korean calendar: 4353
- Minguo calendar: ROC 109 民國109年
- Nanakshahi calendar: 552
- Thai solar calendar: 2563
- Tibetan calendar: ས་མོ་ཕག་ལོ་ (female Earth-Boar); 2146 or 1765 or 993 — to — ལྕགས་ཕོ་བྱི་བ་ལོ་ (male Iron-Rat); 2147 or 1766 or 994
- Unix time: 1577836800 – 1609459199

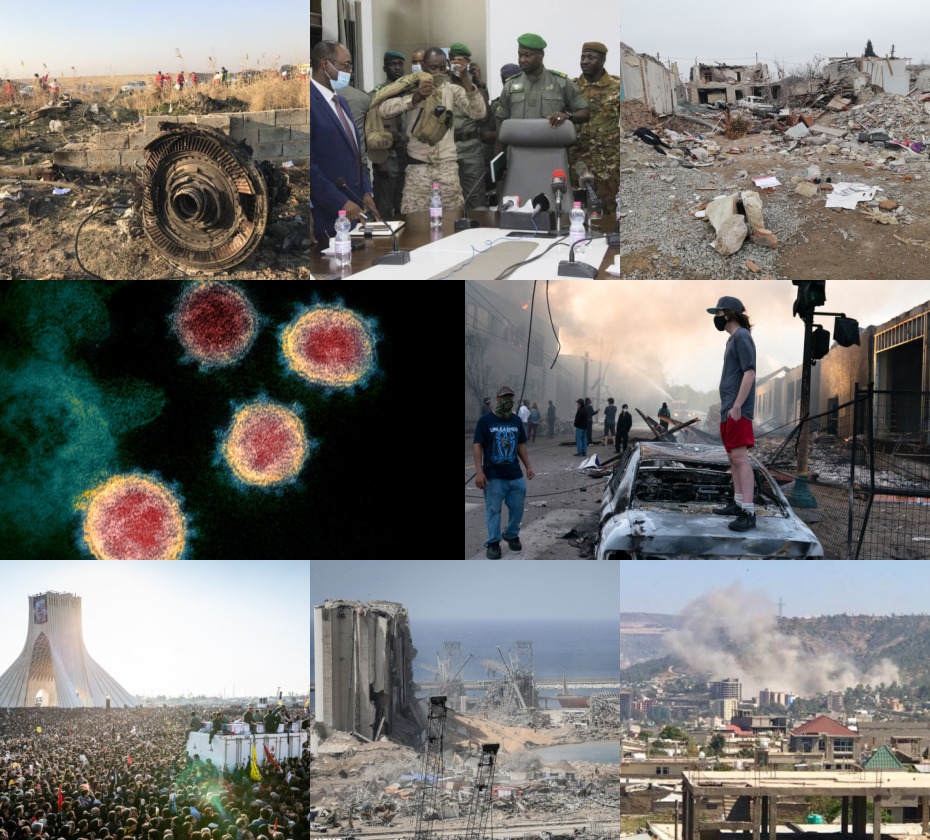
Clockwise from top-left: Ukraine International Airlines Flight 752 is shot down by the Islamic Revolutionary Guard Corps, killing all on board; The Malian Armed Forces overthrow the Government of Mali during the Malian coup d'état; A missile attack causes destruction in Ganja during the Second Nagorno-Karabakh War; A man on a burned-out car observes damage from protests following the murder of George Floyd, who was killed by police officer Derek Chauvin; The aftermath of an airstrike on Mekelle during the Tigray War in Ethiopia; Destruction in the Lebanon's Port of Beirut following an accidental explosion of ammonium nitrate that killed 218 people; Mourners gather for the funeral of Iranian major general Qasem Soleimani after he was assassinated by a drone strike; A colorized transmission electron micrograph of the SARS-CoV-2 virus that caused the COVID-19 pandemic, which infected billions and killed millions of people worldwide.

2020 (MMXX) was a leap year starting on Wednesday of the Gregorian calendar, the 2020th year of the Common Era (CE) and Anno Domini (AD) designations, the 20th year of the 3rd millennium and the 21st century, and the 1st year of the 2020s decade.

In 2020, the COVID-19 pandemic led to a global social, societal and economic disruption, mass cancellations and postponements of events, worldwide lockdowns, and the largest economic recession since the Great Depression in the 1930s. Geospatial World also called 2020 "the worst year in terms of climate change" in part due to major climate disasters worldwide, including major bushfires in Australia and the western United States, as well as extreme tropical cyclone activity affecting large parts of North America. A United Nations progress report published in December 2020 indicated that none of the international Sustainable Development Goals for 2020 were achieved.

The year also saw the rise of social protests and activism amidst the ongoing pandemic. The murder of George Floyd was widely condemned and led to worldwide protests and unrest that lasted until 2023. In addition, elections commenced in numerous nations in 2020. Most notably, the 2020 U.S. presidential election where Democrat and eventual 46th president Joe Biden won against incumbent Republican Donald Trump. Trump refused to concede the presidency, leading directly into an attack on the US Capitol early the following year.

Time magazine used its sixth ever X cover to declare 2020 "the worst year ever," although the cover article itself did not go as far, instead saying, "There have been worse years in U.S. history, and certainly worse years in world history, but most of us alive today have seen nothing like this one."

== Health ==
The outbreak of COVID-19 began in Wuhan, China, in December 2019. It spread to other areas of Asia, and then worldwide in early 2020. The World Health Organization (WHO) declared the outbreak a public health emergency of international concern (PHEIC) on 30 January, and assessed the outbreak had become a pandemic on 11 March.

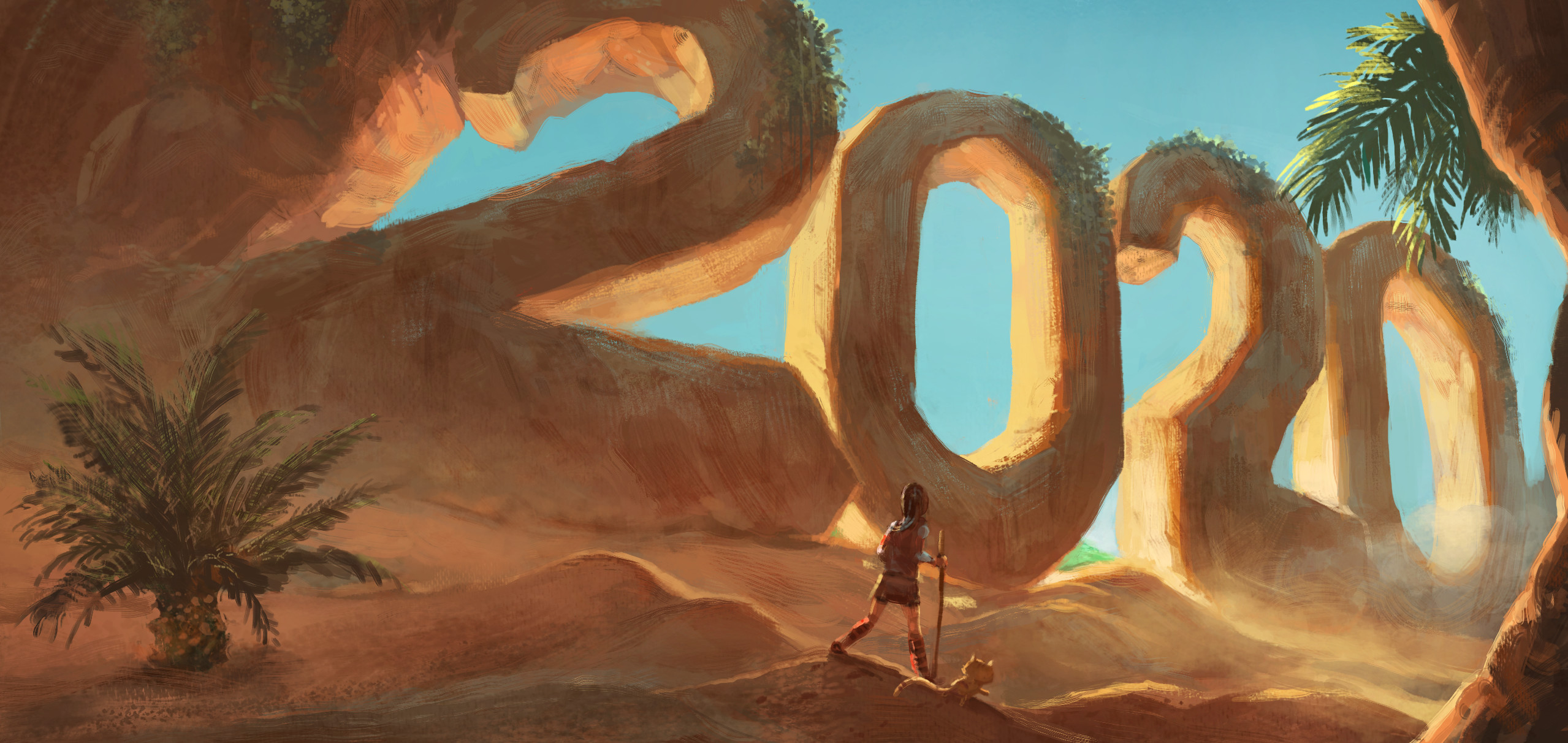
Construction Year in 2020

== Events ==
=== January ===
- January 1
  - Croatia begins its term in the presidency of the European Union.
  - Flash floods struck Jakarta, Indonesia, killing 66 people in the worst flooding in over a decade.
- January 2 – The Royal Australian Air Force and Navy are deployed to New South Wales and Victoria to assist mass evacuation efforts amidst the 2019–20 Australian bushfire season.
- January 3 – A United States drone strike at Baghdad International Airport kills ten people, including the intended target, an Iranian general Qasem Soleimani and Iraqi paramilitary leader Abu Mahdi al-Muhandis.
- January 5
  - Second Libyan Civil War: President Recep Tayyip Erdoğan announces the deployment of Turkish troops to Libya on behalf of the United Nations-backed Government of National Accord.
  - 2019–20 Croatian presidential election: The second round of voting is held, and Zoran Milanović of the Social Democratic Party of Croatia defeats incumbent president Kolinda Grabar-Kitarović.
- January 8
  - Iran launches ballistic missiles at two Iraqi military bases hosting U.S. soldiers, injuring over 100 personnel.
  - Ukraine International Airlines Flight 752 was shot down by Iranian forces shortly after takeoff from Tehran Imam Khomeini International Airport, killing all 176 people on board.
- January 9
  - A rare, circumbinary planet called TOI 1338-b is discovered.
  - Islamic State militants in the Greater Sahara assaulted a Nigerien military base in the battle of Chinagodrar, killing at least 89 Nigerien soldiers.
- January 10 – Haitham bin Tariq succeeds Qaboos bin Said as the Sultan of Oman.
- January 11 – Presidential and legislative elections are held in Taiwan. Incumbent president Tsai Ing-wen is reelected, and the Democratic Progressive Party wins a majority of 67 out of 113 seats in the Legislative Yuan.
- January 12 – The Taal Volcano in the Philippines has had its first major eruption since 1977.
- January 16 – The first impeachment trial of the President of the United States, Donald Trump, begins in the U.S. Senate. He was acquitted on February 5.
- January 18 – Yemeni Civil War: 111 Yemeni soldiers and five civilians are killed in a drone and missile attack on a military camp near Maʼrib.
- January 20 – COVID-19 pandemic: Chinese authorities publicly confirm human-to-human transmission of severe acute respiratory syndrome coronavirus 2.
- January 22 – The Hellenic Parliament elects Katerina Sakellaropoulou as president of Greece.
- January 23 – COVID-19 pandemic: The Chinese city of Wuhan, the epicenter of the initial COVID-19 outbreak, is quarantined, with all scheduled public transport services and intercity flights halted.
- January 26
  - The 2020 Peruvian parliamentary election is held to elect all 130 members of the Congress of the Republic of Peru.
  - 2020 Calabasas helicopter crash: Nine people are killed in an accident in Calabasas, California, including retired basketball player Kobe Bryant and his daughter Gianna; cause later attributed to heavy fog.
- January 29 – U.S. President Donald Trump signs the United States–Mexico–Canada Agreement, a North American trade agreement set to replace NAFTA.
- January 30 – COVID-19 pandemic: The World Health Organization (WHO) declares the outbreak of the disease a public health emergency of international concern, the sixth time that this measure has been invoked since 2009.
- January 31 – The United Kingdom and Gibraltar formally withdraw from the European Union, beginning an 11-month transition period.

=== February ===
- February 6 – Livraga derailment: A Frecciarossa high-speed train traveling from Milan to Salerno derailed in Livraga, Lombardy, Italy. Two people were killed, and 31 were injured.
- February 8 – The 2020 Irish general election is held to elect 160 members of the 33rd Dáil, the lower house of the Oireachtas.
- February 11 – The COVID-19 pandemic: The World Health Organization (WHO) names the disease COVID-19.
- February 13 – NASA publishes a detailed study of Arrokoth, the most distant body ever explored by a spacecraft.
- February 19 – Hanau shootings: Eleven people are killed and five injured in a terrorist shooting spree by a far-right extremist targeting shisha bars in Hanau, near Frankfurt, Germany.
- February 24 – The Pakatan Harapan coalition government of Malaysia collapses and is replaced by the Perikatan Nasional coalition. Muhyiddin Yassin becomes the eighth Prime Minister of Malaysia on March 1.
- February 27 – 2020 stock market crash: Triggered by fears of the spreading of COVID-19, the Dow Jones Industrial Average (DJIA) plunges by 1,190.95 points, or 4.4%, to close at 25,766.64, its largest one-day point decline at the time. This follows several days of large falls, marking the worst week for the index since the 2008 financial crisis.
- February 28 – Syrian Civil War: NATO expresses solidarity with Turkey after 34 Turkish soldiers were killed in an airstrike by pro-Syrian government forces.
- February 29
  - A conditional peace agreement is signed between the United States and the Taliban. The U.S. begins gradually withdrawing combat troops from Afghanistan on March 10.
  - Barquisimeto shooting: During a demonstration, pro-government colectivos shoot at disputed President and Speaker of the National Assembly Juan Guaidó and his supporters in Barquisimeto, Venezuela, leaving five injured.

=== March ===
- March 2 – The Yahoo! Time capsule, dating from 2006, is opened.
- March 5 – The International Criminal Court authorizes the Afghanistan War Crimes inquiry to proceed, reportedly allowing for the first time for U.S. citizens to be investigated.
- March 9
  - COVID-19 pandemic: Italy becomes the first country to implement a nationwide quarantine in response to the COVID-19 outbreak.
  - International share prices fall sharply in response to a Russo-Saudi oil price war and the impact of COVID-19. The DJIA plunges more than 2,000 points, the largest fall in its history up to that point. Oil prices also plunged by as much as 30% in early trading, the biggest fall since 1991.
- March 11
  - COVID-19 pandemic: The World Health Organization declares the COVID-19 outbreak a pandemic.
- March 12 – Global stock markets crashed due to the COVID-19 pandemic and the United States travel ban on the Schengen Area. The DJIA goes into free fall, closing at over −2,300 points, the worst loss for the index since 1987.
- March 13
  - COVID-19 pandemic
    - Formula 1, the FIA and the local race organisers announced the postponements of the season opening 2020 Australian Grand Prix due to the COVID-19 pandemic in Australia. The race would be subsequently cancelled and the season wouldn't start until July.
    - The government of Nepal announces that Mount Everest will be closed to climbers and the public for the rest of the season due to concerns about the COVID-19 pandemic in Asia.
- March 16 – The DJIA falls by 2,997.10, the single largest point drop in history and the second-largest percentage drop ever at 12.93%, an even greater crash than Black Monday (1929). This follows the U.S. Federal Reserve announcing that it will cut its target interest rate to 0–0.25%.
- March 17
  - COVID-19 pandemic:
    - The European Union's external and Schengen borders are closed for at least 30 days in an effort to curb the COVID-19 pandemic.
    - The Euro 2020 and 2020 Copa América association football tournaments are postponed until the summer of 2021 by UEFA and CONMEBOL, respectively.
- March 18
  - COVID-19 pandemic:
    - The Eurovision Song Contest 2020 is cancelled due to the spread of COVID-19 in Europe, the first cancellation in the contest's 64-year history.
    - The Solidarity Trial, a WHO-sponsored clinical trial dedicated to finding a cure against COVID-19, is announced.
- March 20
  - COVID-19 pandemic: The worldwide death toll from COVID-19 surpasses 10,000 as the total number of cases reaches a quarter of a million.
  - The Bhadla Solar Park is commissioned and becomes the world's largest solar park.
- March 24
  - COVID-19 pandemic:
    - India and the United Kingdom go into lockdown to contain COVID-19. The total number of people in the world facing some form of pandemic-related movement restriction now exceeds 2.6 billion, a third of the global population.
    - Chinese Premier Li Keqiang reports that the domestically transmitted epidemic is now under control. Two days later, China temporarily suspends entry for foreign nationals with visas or residence permits, effective midnight on March 28.
    - The International Olympic Committee and Japan postpone the 2020 Summer Olympics to 2021. On March 30, the Summer Olympics will be rescheduled from July 23 to August 8, 2021.
- The European Council has announced its decision to begin negotiations regarding the accession of Albania and North Macedonia to the European Union.
- March 26
  - COVID-19 pandemic:
    - Global COVID-19 cases reach 500,000, with nearly 23,000 deaths confirmed. The U.S. surpasses China and Italy in the total number of known COVID-19 cases, with at least 81,321 cases and more than 1,000 deaths.
    - Militants in the Philippines, Syria, Yemen, and Libya agree to U.N. Secretary-General António Guterres' call for a ceasefire; some accept medical aid for themselves and civilians in their communities. Colombia and Venezuela discuss a common response to the global pandemic, and the UAE airlifts aid to Iran.
- March 27 – North Macedonia becomes the 30th country to join NATO.
- March 28 – The region of Uusimaa (with the capital city Helsinki) is temporarily isolated from the rest of Finland due to increased COVID-19 infections.
- March 30 – 2020 Russia–Saudi Arabia oil price war: The price of Brent Crude falls 9% to $23 per barrel, the lowest level since November 2002.

=== April ===
- April 1
  - COVID-19 pandemic:
    - China reports 130 asymptomatic cases of COVID-19, its first reported asymptomatic cases.
    - Yemen's internationally recognised government releases more than 470 of its prisoners amid concerns of the spread of the virus in Yemen's overcrowded jails. The United Nations Human Rights Council has called for the release of all political prisoners.
- April 2 – COVID-19 pandemic: The number of confirmed cases of COVID-19 passes 1 million worldwide.
- April 5 – COVID-19 pandemic: The first case of COVID-19 in a zoo animal is reported: a four-year-old female Malayan tiger at the Bronx Zoo in New York City.
- April 6 – The United States designates the Russian Imperial Movement as a terrorist organization and imposes sanctions on its leaders; it is the first white supremacist group the U.S. has designated as a terrorist organization.
- April 7 – COVID-19 pandemic: Japan declares a state of emergency in response to COVID-19 and finalises a stimulus package worth 108 trillion yen (US$990 billion), equal to 20% of the country's GDP.
- April 8 – COVID-19 pandemic: The Saudi–led coalition declares a unilateral ceasefire in its operations against Houthi forces in Yemen in accordance with United Nations-led efforts.
- April 10
  - Kivu Ebola epidemic: The Democratic Republic of the Congo reports the first case of Ebola since February 2020. The outbreak has killed more than 2,200 people since August 2018.
  - The ESA/JAXA space probe BepiColombo makes its final gravity assist around Earth and begins to depart for Venus, where it will make several gravity assist maneuvers before finally arriving at Mercury in 2025.
  - COVID-19 pandemic:
    - The death toll from COVID-19 exceeds 100,000 globally, a ten-fold increase from March 20.
    - EU finance ministers agree on a €540 billion loan package to alleviate the economic fallout of the coronavirus pandemic.
- April 12
  - COVID-19 pandemic: Pope Francis livestreams the Urbi et Orbi blessing for Easter; it is the second blessing in a month, with the first taking place on March 27 during a special prayer service for the end of the pandemic.
  - OPEC and allies strike a deal to cut oil production by 9.7 million barrels per day, the largest such cut agreed upon, starting May 1.
- April 14
  - COVID-19 pandemic
    - The International Monetary Fund (IMF) says it expects the world economy to shrink 3%, the worst contraction since the Great Depression of the 1930s.
    - U.S. president Donald Trump announces that the U.S. will suspend funding towards the World Health Organization (WHO) pending an investigation of its handling of the COVID-19 pandemic and its relationship with China.
- April 15
  - COVID-19 pandemic:
    - The number of confirmed cases of COVID-19 passes 2 million worldwide.
    - The 2020 Tour de France is delayed until August 2020 due to the COVID-19 pandemic.
    - The 2020 South Korean legislative election is held to elect all 300 members of the National Assembly of South Korea and the Democratic Party of Korea-Platform Party alliance wins 180 out of 300 seats.
- April 17
  - The China Securities Regulatory Commission approves a transaction in which Switzerland's Credit Suisse will take a majority interest in a China securities firm, making Credit Suisse the first foreign bank to own a majority of such a company since the easing of foreign ownership rules in 2018.
  - COVID-19 pandemic:
    - China revises the COVID-19 death toll in Wuhan upward, adding 1,290 more fatalities to bring the country's reported COVID-19 deaths to 4,632.
    - Europe surpasses 100,000 COVID-19-related deaths.
    - The U.N. Human Rights Office accuses Myanmar of carrying out daily airstrikes in the Rakhine and Chin states and that at least 32 civilians have been killed since March 23. The separatist Arakan Army unilaterally declared a month-long ceasefire to fight the pandemic, but the military rejected the ceasefire claiming a previous ceasefire had been reneged by the insurgents.
- April 18 – 44 suspected Boko Haram members are found dead, apparently due to poisoning, inside a prison in N'Djamena, Chad.
- April 19 – COVID-19 pandemic: Unrest breaks out in Paris, Berlin and Vladikavkaz as opposition to COVID-19 lockdowns continues.
- April 20
  - Oil prices reach a record low, with West Texas Intermediate falling into negative values.
  - The Industrial Bank of Korea agrees to pay US$86 million and will enter a two-year deferred prosecution agreement to settle lawsuits with the U.S. Department of Justice and the state of New York over a 2011 scheme to help transfer US$1 billion to Iran.
  - Israeli Prime Minister Benjamin Netanyahu and Blue and White Alliance leader Benny Gantz agree on a deal to form a unity government, thus ending more than a year of political deadlock. As part of the deal, Netanyahu will hold onto his position for 18 more months, with Gantz replacing him afterwards.
- April 21 – Mozambique police say 52 male villagers were killed by Islamist militants earlier this month in Muidumbe District, Cabo Delgado Province, after they refused to join their ranks.
- April 22 – Iran's Islamic Revolutionary Guard Corps deploys the country's first military satellite, using a new satellite carrier called "Ghased" ("Messenger").
- April 23
  - Syrian Civil War: Two former high-ranking members of the Syrian Army go on trial in Koblenz, Germany, for alleged war crimes committed during the civil war. It is the first time that Syrian military officials are prosecuted for their roles in the conflict.
  - COVID-19 pandemic: Facebook removes "pseudoscience" and "conspiracy theory" as options for targeted ads as criticism mounts against social media for its role in spreading misinformation about COVID-19.
- April 25
  - Yemeni Civil War: The Southern Transitional Council (STC) announces the establishment of a self-rule administration in southern Yemen and deploys forces in Aden. Governors of multiple southern Yemeni Governorates and Socotra island reject the STC's claim to self-rule and declare their loyalty to President Abdrabbuh Mansur Hadi. Months later on July 19, the STC accepts a Saudi-brokered peace deal and abandons its self-rule aspirations.
  - COVID-19 pandemic: The global death toll from COVID-19 exceeds 200,000. The UK becomes the fifth country to report 20,000 deaths.
- April 26 – King Salman issues a royal decree, declaring that people will no longer be executed in Saudi Arabia for crimes they were convicted of when they were minors.
- April 27 – COVID-19 pandemic: The number of confirmed cases passes 3 million worldwide, while the number of confirmed cases in the U.S. passes 1 million.
- April 28
  - A fast radio burst is detected from the Magnetar SGR 1935+2154, the first ever detected inside the Milky Way, and the first to be linked to a known source.
  - Colombia formalizes its membership with the Organisation for Economic Co-operation and Development (OECD), becoming the 37th nation of the organization.
  - The Indian Ministry of External Affairs condemns the U.S. Commission on International Religious Freedom after its annual report recommends placing India on the "countries of particular concern" blacklist over the Citizenship Amendment Act, the revocation of Jammu and Kashmir's special status, and controversial comments made by Home Minister Amit Shah, among others.
- April 29 – (52768) 1998 OR2, a near-Earth asteroid that is 2 kilometers (1.2 mi) wide, makes a close approach of 0.042 AU (6.3 million km; 16 LD) to Earth. It will not approach closer than this until 2079.
- April 30
  - NASA officially selects SpaceX, Blue Origin, and Dynetics to build its next-generation lunar lander to carry American astronauts to the Moon by 2024.
  - Bulgaria applies for ERM II (the "waiting room" for the Eurozone), due to join along with Croatia in July 2020.

=== May ===
- May 1
  - COVID-19 pandemic: The total number of recovered COVID-19 patients reaches 1 million worldwide, according to data from The Johns Hopkins University.
  - Guanare prison riot: A riot and attempted escape attempt leaves 47 dead and 75 injured in the Centro Penitenciario de los Llanos in Guanare, Venezuela.
- May 2 – The United Nations publishes a report stating that Russia's indiscriminate bombing of civilians in Syria constitutes a war crime.
- May 3–4 – Venezuelan dissidents and a North American-based private military company, Silvercorp USA, unsuccessfully attempt to infiltrate Venezuela and forcibly remove President Nicolás Maduro from office.
- May 4 – A team of British and Kenyan scientists announce the discovery of Microsporidia MB, a parasitic microbe in the Microsporidia fungi group that blocks mosquitos from carrying malaria, potentially paving the way for the control of malaria.
- May 5
  - COVID-19 pandemic: The U.K. death toll from COVID-19 becomes the highest in Europe at 32,313 after exceeding the death toll of 29,029 in Italy.
  - The biggest television network in the Philippines, ABS-CBN, ceased operations for the first time in almost five decades because of the loss of its franchise.
- May 6
  - Astronomers announce the discovery of the first black hole located in a star system visible to the naked eye.
  - COVID-19 pandemic: New evidence indicates that an Algerian-born French fishmonger, who had not traveled to China and did not have contact with any Chinese nationals, was treated for pneumonia from an unknown source on December 27, 2019, now identified as COVID-19.
- May 8 – The Aurangabad railway accident occurred in India. 17 migrants were sleeping on the trains when a freight train collided and killed 16 people and injured 1.
- May 9 – Several Chinese and Indian soldiers are injured in a cross-border clash at the Nathu La crossing. About 150 troops participated in the face-off, which involved fistfights and stone-throwing.
- May 10
  - The Iranian Navy frigate Jamaran accidentally strikes the Iranian support vessel Konarak with a missile, killing nineteen sailors. This is the first friendly fire incident since February 2019, when an Indian Mil Mi-17 helicopter was mistakenly shot down by Indian air defense forces.
  - COVID-19 pandemic: Wuhan reports its first coronavirus cases in more than a month. An 89-year-old man is confirmed positive, but his wife and several members of the community are recorded as asymptomatic cases.
- May 11 – The Max Planck Institute for Evolutionary Anthropology publishes the result of radiocarbon and DNA analysis from the fossils that has been found in the Bacho Kiro cave, Bulgaria. The result, showing that the fossils belong to Homo sapiens instead of Neanderthal, indicates that modern humans may have arrived in Europe thousands of years earlier than previously thought.
- May 12 – Gunmen storm a maternity hospital and kill 24 people, including two newborn babies, in Dashte Barchi, a majority-Shia neighborhood of Kabul, Afghanistan. In a separate incident in Kuz Kunar, 32 people are killed at a funeral by a suicide bomber.
- May 14
  - COVID-19 pandemic:
    - The global death toll from COVID-19 exceeds 300,000.
    - The UN warns of a global mental health crisis caused by isolation, fear, uncertainty and economic turmoil.
  - NATO Secretary General Jens Stoltenberg says the military alliance is "ready to support" the UN-recognized Government of National Accord in Libya while Greece, a member state of NATO, strongly criticizes Stoltenberg's remarks, saying his recognition of the "Muslim Brotherhood government" does not reflect the positions of the military alliance.
- May 15 – Researchers announce a 2.5 cm millipede fossil belonging to the Kampecaris genus, discovered on the island of Kerrera in the Scottish Inner Hebrides, is the world's oldest-known land animal, which lived 425 million years ago in the Silurian period.
- May 16 – Félicien Kabuga, a Rwandan businessman responsible for supporting the Rwandan genocide, is arrested in Asnières-sur-Seine, France, after 26 years as a fugitive.
- May 18
  - The United Nations Office for the Coordination of Humanitarian Affairs announces that nearly 1 million people are affected and at least 24 people have died in flash floods that have hit Beledweyne and Jowhar, Somalia.
  - In a historic move, the World Health Organization holds its annual World Health Assembly using video conferencing instead of in-person meetings.
- May 19 – Palestinian President Mahmoud Abbas announces the termination of all agreements, including security ones, with Israel and the United States in response to Israel's plans to annex the Jordan Valley.
- May 21
  - Cyclone Amphan makes landfall in eastern India and Bangladesh, killing over 100 people and forcing the evacuation of more than 4 million others. It causes over US$13 billion in damage, making it the costliest cyclone ever recorded in the North Indian Ocean, shattering the record previously held by Nargis.
  - The U.S. announces it will withdraw from the Open Skies Treaty within six months, alleging continuous violations by Russia.
  - COVID-19 pandemic: The number of confirmed cases of COVID-19 passes 5 million worldwide, with 106,000 new cases recorded over the past 24 hours, the highest single-day figure so far.
- May 22
  - Flight PK8303, a Pakistan International Airlines passenger aircraft, crashes in a residential area near Karachi, in Pakistan, killing 97 of the 99 total people on board and injuring dozens on the ground.
  - COVID-19 pandemic: Brazil overtakes Russia to become the country with the second highest number of COVID-19 cases, with over 330,000 reported. President Jair Bolsonaro continues to dismiss the threat of the virus.
- May 23 – COVID-19 pandemic: China reports no new cases for the first time since the pandemic began, according to the National Health Commission.
- May 24
  - Mining corporation Rio Tinto admits to blowing up the 46,000-year-old Juukan Gorge caves in the Pilbara area of Western Australia. The firm later issues an apology to the two Aboriginal peoples who are the traditional owners of the site.
  - Egyptian President Abdel Fattah el-Sisi pardons 3,157 prisoners to celebrate Eid al-Fitr and, two days later, President of Zambia Edgar Lungu pardons nearly 3,000 inmates to commemorate Africa Freedom Day.
- May 25
  - The 2020 Surinamese general election is held to elect all 51 members of the National Assembly of Suriname.
  - Euroleague Basketball announces that it has cancelled the 2019-20 Turkish Airlines EuroLeague and 7DAYS EuroCup seasons due to the COVID-19 pandemic.
- May 26
  - Protests caused by the murder of George Floyd break out across hundreds of cities in the U.S. and around the world. These are followed by further protests and rallies on June 6 against racism and police brutality around the world.
  - Costa Rica becomes the first Central American country to legalise same-sex marriage.
  - LATAM Airlines, the largest air carrier in Latin America, files for Chapter 11 bankruptcy.
- May 27
  - The Chinese National People's Congress votes in favour of national security legislation that criminalizes "secession", "subversion", "terrorism" and foreign interference in Hong Kong; the legislation grants sweeping powers to the Chinese central government to suppress the Hong Kong democracy movement, including banning activist groups and curtailing civil liberties. The U.S. government responds by declaring Hong Kong is "no longer autonomous" under the United States-Hong Kong Policy Act.
  - COVID-19 pandemic: The U.S. death toll passes 100,000 – more Americans than were killed in the Vietnam War and Korean War combined, and approaching that of the First World War, where 116,000 Americans died in combat. The total number of cases continues to rise, although the rate is slowing.
- May 30 – The first crewed flight of the SpaceX Dragon 2 (initially scheduled for May 27 but delayed due to weather) is launched from Cape Canaveral, Florida, the first crewed spacecraft to take off from U.S. soil since the retirement of the Space Shuttle in 2011.

=== June ===
- June 1 – Kivu Ebola epidemic: The World Health Organization reports six new cases of Ebola, and UNICEF reports five deaths, in a renewed outbreak of the disease in Mbandaka, Équateur Province, Democratic Republic of the Congo.
- June 2 – A US$5 billion class action lawsuit is filed against Alphabet Inc. and Google, alleging the company violates users' right to privacy by tracking them in Chrome's incognito mode.
- June 3
  - Prime Minister Boris Johnson says the UK will change immigration laws to offer a pathway to UK citizenship for all Hong Kong citizens who are eligible for BN(O) status if the government of China imposes new security laws on the territory.
  - SpaceX successfully launches and deploys 60 Starlink satellites into a low Earth orbit from Cape Canaveral Air Force Station, bringing the total number of Starlink satellites in orbit to 482.
  - Russian President Vladimir Putin declares a state of emergency after 20,000 tons of oil leaked into the Ambarnaya River near the Siberian city of Norilsk within the Arctic Circle on May 26, 2020. The World Wildlife Fund said the accident is believed to be the second-largest in modern Russian history.
- June 4
  - Libya's Government of National Accord (GNA) says they are in full control of the capital, Tripoli, after forces of the Libyan National Army (LNA) retreat from the territory following months of intense fighting in the city.
  - Hong Kong's legislative council passes the controversial National Anthem Ordinance.
- June 5 – The 2020 Saint Kitts and Nevis general election is held to elect 11 members of the National Assembly of Saint Kitts and Nevis.
- June 7 – COVID-19 pandemic: The global death toll from COVID-19 exceeds 400,000.
- June 8 – COVID-19 pandemic: The number of confirmed cases of COVID-19 passes 7 million worldwide.
- June 9 – COVID-19 pandemic: A Harvard University study suggests that COVID-19 may have been spreading in China as early as August 2019, based on hospital car park usage and web search trends.
- June 15
  - At least 20 Indian soldiers and over 40 Chinese forces are killed or injured in skirmishes in the disputed Galwan Valley, the largest escalation along the Sino-Indian border in five decades.
  - Turkish and Iranian forces commence air and artillery strikes against Kurdistan Workers' Party forces in Iraqi Kurdistan. Turkey launches a land operation in the region on June 17.
- June 16
  - COVID-19 pandemic: The number of confirmed cases of COVID-19 passes 8 million worldwide.
  - North Korea demolishes the Inter-Korean Liaison Office in Kaesong, established in 2018 to improve relations.
- June 21
  - An annular solar eclipse occurs.
  - The 2020 Serbian parliamentary election is held to elect all 250 members of the National Assembly of Serbia. The ruling For Our Children coalition wins 188 out of 250 seats.
- June 22
  - COVID-19 pandemic: The number of confirmed cases of COVID-19 passes 9 million worldwide.
  - The 2020 Kiribati presidential election is held and incumbent president Taneti Maamau is reelected.
  - The 2020 Malawian presidential election is held and Lazarus Chakwera of the Malawi Congress Party is elected president.
- June 24 – The 2020 Mongolian legislative election is held to elect the State Great Khural and the ruling Mongolian People's Party wins 62 out of 76 seats.
- June 27
  - Micheál Martin succeeds Leo Varadkar as Taoiseach of Ireland, with Varadkar becoming Tánaiste in a historic three-party coalition government.
  - The 2020 Icelandic presidential election is held and incumbent president Guðni Th. Jóhannesson is reelected.
- June 28
  - COVID-19 pandemic:
    - The number of confirmed cases of COVID-19 passes 10 million worldwide. The U.S. continues to report the highest number of any country as it reaches 2.5 million, a quarter of all cases globally.
    - The global death toll from COVID-19 exceeds 500,000.
    - The first round of voting of the 2020 Polish presidential election is held.
- June 30 – China passes the controversial Hong Kong national security law, allowing China to crack down on opposition to Beijing at home or abroad.

=== July ===
- July 1 – Russian voters back a constitutional amendment that, among other things, enables Vladimir Putin to seek two further six-year terms when his current term ends in 2024, potentially allowing him to remain in power until 2036.
- July 5
  - The 2020 Croatian parliamentary election is held to elect all 151 members of the Croatian Parliament.
  - 2020 Dominican Republic general election: Modern Revolutionary Party candidate Luis Abinader is elected president of the Dominican Republic, the Modern Revolutionary Party wins 17 out of 32 seats in the Senate and 86 out of 190 seats in the Chamber of Deputies.
- July 7
  - Protests begin throughout Bulgaria with the goal of removing Borisov's cabinet and Chief Prosecutor Ivan Geshev from office.
  - COVID-19 pandemic: Thousands of people rally outside the House of the National Assembly of Serbia in Belgrade in response to stricter lockdown measures proposed by President Aleksandar Vučić following an increase of cases in the city.
- July 8 – At least 180 bodies are found in mass graves in Djibo, Burkina Faso, where soldiers are fighting jihadists. It is suspected that government forces were involved in mass extrajudicial executions.
- July 10
  - The ECB accepts Bulgaria and Croatia into ERM II, a mandatory stage for countries wishing to adopt the euro. This is the currency union's first major expansion in half a decade.
  - Turkey's President Recep Tayyip Erdoğan orders the Hagia Sophia in Istanbul to be reverted to a mosque following a supreme court annulment of a 1934 presidential decree that made it into a museum.
  - The 2020 Singaporean general election is held to elect all 93 members of the Parliament of Singapore and the People's Action Party, led by prime minister Lee Hsien Loong wins 83 out of 93 seats.
- July 12 – The second round of voting for the 2020 Polish presidential election is held and incumbent president Andrzej Duda is reelected.
- July 15 – The Twitter accounts of prominent political figures, CEOs, and celebrities are hacked to promote a bitcoin scam.
- July 19 – Flooding of the Brahmaputra River kills 189 and leaves 4 million homeless in India and Nepal.
- July 21 – COVID-19 pandemic: European leaders agree to create a €750 billion (US$858 billion) recovery fund to rebuild EU economies impacted by the pandemic.
- July 22 – COVID-19 pandemic: The number of confirmed cases of COVID-19 passes 15 million worldwide.
- July 25 – COVID-19 pandemic: North Korean leader Kim Jong-un convenes an emergency meeting, declares a state of emergency, and orders the lockdown of Kaesong after a person suspected of having COVID-19 returned from South Korea. If confirmed, it would be the first case to be officially acknowledged by North Korea.
- July 28 – Former Prime Minister of Malaysia Najib Razak is found guilty of all seven charges in the first of five trials on the 1MDB scandal, being jailed 12 years and fined RM210 million as a result.
- July 30 – NASA successfully launches its Mars 2020 rover mission to search for signs of ancient life and collect samples for return to Earth. The mission includes technology demonstrations to prepare for future human missions.

=== August ===
- August 1 – The Barakah nuclear power plant in the UAE becomes operational following delays since 2017. It is the first commercial nuclear power station in the Arab world.
- August 2 – COVID-19 pandemic: In rare talks, Emirati Foreign Minister Sheikh Abdullah bin Zayed Al Nahyan and Iranian Foreign Minister Mohammad Javad Zarif hold a video call to discuss various regional issues, including combating COVID-19 in their respective countries.
- August 4 – An explosion caused by unsafely stored ammonium nitrate kills at least 218 people, injures thousands, and severely damages the port in Beirut, Lebanon. Damage is estimated at $10–15 billion, and an estimated 300,000 people are left homeless. The following day, the Lebanese government declares a two-week state of emergency.
- August 5 – U.S. Secretary of Health and Human Services Alex Azar travels to Taiwan, the highest U.S. official visit to the country in 40 years. The PRC condemns the visit.
- August 7 – Air India Express Flight 1344 crashes after overrunning the runway at Calicut International Airport in Kerala, India, killing 19 of the 191 people on board.
- August 9 – A presidential election in Belarus which led to incumbent Alexander Lukashenko's reelection sparks protests throughout the country after major opposition candidate Sviatlana Tsikhanouskaya rejected the results. Seven days later, the largest political march in Belarusian history takes place, with an estimated 300,000 people in Minsk and 200,000 in other Belarusian cities and towns.
- August 10
  - An intense derecho kills 4 and brings widespread damaging wind to much of the Midwestern United States in what becomes the costliest thunderstorm event in US history.
  - COVID-19 pandemic: The number of confirmed cases of COVID-19 passes 20 million worldwide.
  - The 2020 Trinidad and Tobago general election is held to elect all 41 members of the House of Representatives of Trinidad and Tobago, the lower house of the bicameral Parliament of Trinidad and Tobago and the People's National Movement party, led by prime minister Keith Rowley won 22 out of 41 seats.
- August 11 – COVID-19 pandemic: Russian President Vladimir Putin announces that Russia has approved the world's first COVID-19 vaccine.
- August 13 – Israel and the UAE agree to normalise relations, marking the third Israel–Arab peace deal.
- August 15 – The Japanese bulk carrier Wakashio, which stranded on a reef in Mauritius last month, breaks in half. Approximately 1,000 tonnes of oil are spilled into the ocean, becoming the largest environmental disaster in the history of Mauritius.
- August 18 – A mutiny in a military base by soldiers of the Malian Armed Forces develops into a coup d'état. President Ibrahim Boubacar Keïta and Prime Minister Boubou Cissé, among other senior governmental and military officers, are arrested. The next day, Keïta announces his resignation on state television.
- August 19 – The Special Tribunal for Lebanon convicts in absentia Salim Ayyash, a senior member of Hezbollah, for the 2005 assassination of former Prime Minister Rafic Hariri.
- August 22 – COVID-19 pandemic: The worldwide death toll from COVID-19 exceeds 800,000.
- August 23 – Bayern Munich wins the 2019–20 UEFA Champions League by beating Paris Saint-Germain in the final 1–0.
- August 25 – Africa is declared free of wild polio, the second virus to be eradicated from the continent since smallpox 40 years previously.
- August 26 – Amazon CEO Jeff Bezos becomes the first person in history to have a net worth exceeding US$200 billion, according to Forbes.
- August 27 – Hurricane Laura makes landfall in Lake Charles, Louisiana with winds of 150 mph, making it the strongest hurricane to ever strike the state in terms of windspeed, tied with the 1856 Last Island Hurricane.
- August 28 – Japanese Prime Minister Shinzo Abe, the longest-serving prime minister in the history of Japan, announces his resignation from office, citing ill health.
- August 30 – COVID-19 pandemic: The number of confirmed cases of COVID-19 passes 25 million worldwide. India continues to record the highest daily increase of cases.

=== September ===
- September 2 – Intel introduces a new logo and its slogan "What's inside has never mattered more.", which was later changed to "Do something wonderful.".
- September 3
  - Sudanese Prime Minister Abdalla Hamdok and Abdelaziz al-Hilu, the leader of the Sudan People's Liberation Movement-North (SPLM–N), sign an agreement to transition the country into a secular state. The agreement comes three days after the signing of a peace deal between Sudan's transitional government and the Sudan Revolutionary Front, which the SPLM–N opted out of. Weeks later on October 3, the transitional government signed a peace deal with the main rebel groups, including the SPLM–N, which had refused to engage in previous talks.
  - The skeletons of 200 mammoths and 30 other animals are unearthed at a construction site for the Mexico City Santa Lucía Airport. It is the largest find of mammoth bones to date, surpassing The Mammoth Site in the U.S. which had 61 skeletons.
- September 4
  - Pope Benedict XVI becomes the longest-lived pope at 93 years, 4 months, and 16 days, surpassing Pope Leo XIII, who died in 1903.
  - The La Línea highway tunnel, the longest road tunnel in South America at a length of 8.65 kilometres (5.37 mi), is opened in Colombia after 14 years of construction and several delays.
  - Kosovo and Serbia announce that they will normalize economic relations. The two countries will also move their Israeli embassies to Jerusalem, becoming the third and fourth countries to recognize Jerusalem as Israel's capital.
  - Bahrain and Israel agree to normalise relations, marking the fourth Israel–Arab peace deal.
- September 6 – Typhoon Haishen makes landfall on Japan and then South Korea as a strong category 2-equivalent typhoon. It later makes landfall on North Korea where widespread flooding occurs.
- September 14
  - Former Prime Minister of Malaysia Najib Razak is listed on the Malaysian Anti-Corruption Commission (MACC) online database of corruption offenders convicted locally. His name at the top of the first page of the MACC Corruption Offenders Database.
  - The Royal Astronomical Society announces the detection of phosphine in Venus' atmosphere, which is known to be a strong predictor for the presence of microbial life.
  - The first discovery of the perfectly preserved remains of a cave bear, believed to be 22,000 to 39,500 years old (Late Pleistocene), is made in Lyakhovsky Islands, Siberia in the thawing permafrost.
- September 16
  - A United Nations Human Rights Council fact-finding mission formally accuses the Venezuelan government of crimes against humanity, including cases of killings, torture, violence against political opposition and disappearances since 2014. President Nicolás Maduro and other senior Venezuelan officials are among those implicated in the charges.
  - Yoshihide Suga becomes the new Prime Minister of Japan, replacing Shinzo Abe.
  - Hurricane Sally makes landfall on the Alabama coast as a high-end Category 2 hurricane, causing over $8 billion in damages and killing 8 people.
- September 17
  - France, Germany, and the United Kingdom issue a joint note verbale to the United Nations rejecting China's claims to the South China Sea, and supporting the ruling in Philippines v. China that said the historic rights per the nine-dash line ran counter to the United Nations Convention on the Law of the Sea. However, the statement says that on "territorial sovereignty" they "take no position".
  - COVID-19 pandemic: The number of confirmed cases of COVID-19 passes 30 million worldwide.
- September 19 – A 1634 edition of The Two Noble Kinsmen, the last play by English playwright William Shakespeare, is discovered at the Royal Scots College's library in Salamanca, Spain. It is believed to be the oldest copy of any of his works in the country.
- September 20 – BuzzFeed News and the International Consortium of Investigative Journalists (ICIJ) release the FinCEN Files, a collection of 2,657 documents relating to the Financial Crimes Enforcement Network describing over 200,000 suspicious transactions valued at over US$2 trillion that occurred from 1999 to 2017 across multiple global financial institutions.
- September 21 – Microsoft agrees to buy video game holding company ZeniMax Media, including Bethesda Softworks and their following subsidiaries for US$7.5 billion, in what was the biggest and most expensive takeover in the history of the video game industry.
- September 27 – Beginning of the Second Nagorno-Karabakh War: deadly clashes erupt in Nagorno-Karabakh between Armenian and Azerbaijani forces. Armenia, Azerbaijan, and the Republic of Artsakh introduce martial law and mobilize forces.
- September 29
  - COVID-19 pandemic: The worldwide death toll from COVID-19 exceeds one million.
  - The Emir of Kuwait Sheikh Sabah Al-Sabah dies at the age of 91. Crown Prince Nawaf Al-Ahmad Al-Jaber Al-Sabah is named his successor.

=== October ===
- October 1 – The EU began legal proceedings against the UK after it ignored their deadline to drop controversial sections from its internal market Bill.
- October 5 – COVID-19 pandemic: The number of confirmed cases of COVID-19 passes 35 million worldwide. The news coincides with the World Health Organization estimating that total worldwide cases may be around 760 million; roughly a tenth of the global population.
- October 6 – Serious floods affected in Central Vietnam, lasted nearly 3 months and killed at least 249 people.
- October 15
  - 2020 Thai protests: The Government of Thailand declares a "severe" state of emergency banning gatherings of five or more people, initiating a crackdown on demonstrations and imposing media censorship.
  - President of Kyrgyzstan Sooronbay Jeenbekov resigns from office after weeks of massive protests in the wake of the October 2020 parliamentary election; opposition leader Sadyr Japarov assumes office as both the acting president and Prime Minister of Kyrgyzstan.
- October 17 – 2020 New Zealand general election: Jacinda Ardern's Labour Party wins a landslide second term in office, defeating the National Party led by Judith Collins and gaining the country's first parliamentary majority since the introduction of the MMP voting system.
- October 19 – COVID-19 pandemic: The number of confirmed cases of COVID-19 passes 40 million worldwide.
- October 20 – NASA's OSIRIS-REx spacecraft briefly touches down on Bennu, becoming the agency's first probe to retrieve samples from an asteroid, with its cargo later successfully returning to Earth on September 24, 2023.
- October 21 – Heavy rains brought by tropical storm Linfa caused landslides at the Rao Trang 3 hydroelectric plant in Thua Thien Hue, Vietnam, killing 17 construction workers and 13 soldiers who were on a rescue mission.
- October 22 – The Geneva Consensus Declaration on Promoting Women's Health and Strengthening the Family is signed by government representatives from 34 countries.
- October 23
  - At the end of an 11-year demining process, the Falkland Islands are declared free of land mines, 38 years after the end of the 1982 war.
  - Israel and Sudan agree to normalise relations, marking the fifth Israel–Arab peace deal.
- October 26 – NASA confirms the existence of molecular water on the sunlit side of the Moon, near Clavius crater, at concentrations of up to 412 parts per million.
- October 29 – The International Organization for Migration (IOM) confirms the death of at least 140 migrants who drowned off the coast of Senegal on a vessel bound for the Spanish Canary Islands, making it the deadliest shipwreck of 2020.
- October 30
  - 2020 Aegean Sea earthquake: A magnitude 7.0 earthquake hits Turkey and Greece, killing 119 people and injuring over 1,000.
  - COVID-19 pandemic: The number of confirmed cases of COVID-19 passes 45 million worldwide.
- October 31 – Typhoon Goni makes landfall in the Philippines, becoming the strongest landfalling tropical cyclone in history, displacing hundreds of thousands of people and killing dozens of people in the region.

=== November ===
- November 1 – 2020 Moldovan presidential election: Former Prime Minister and Minister of Education Maia Sandu is elected as the 6th President of Moldova, becoming the first woman to ever hold the post.
- November 3 – 4
  - 2020 United States presidential election: The election of Joe Biden as the 46th President of the United States and Kamala Harris as the 49th Vice President of the United States is called by many news media organizations after remaining vote counts (November 7) come in from key states delayed by an influx of mail-in ballots caused by the pandemic, defeating incumbent President Donald Trump.
  - 2020 United States elections take place, ending in an overall success for the Democratic Party and securing a trifecta.
  - The United States formally exits the Paris Agreement on climate change.
  - Beginning of the Tigray War: Ethiopia launches an offensive in Tigray following an attack on Ethiopian military bases by the Tigray People's Liberation Front.
- November 7 – Hurricane Eta makes landfall in Nicaragua, killing over 100 people in Central America as a category 4.
- November 8 – COVID-19 pandemic: The number of confirmed cases of COVID-19 passes 50 million worldwide.
- November 9
  - Second Nagorno-Karabakh War: Armenia, Azerbaijan and Russia sign a ceasefire agreement, formally ending the war.
  - COVID-19 pandemic: The first successful phase III trial of a COVID-19 vaccine is announced by drug companies Pfizer and BioNTech, which is 90% effective according to interim results.
- November 10 – Apple releases the first Mac computers (a new MacBook Air, Mac mini and MacBook Pro) powered by Apple silicon chips.
- November 11 – COVID-19 pandemic: The Sputnik V vaccine is proven to be 92% effective against COVID-19 according to interim results.
- November 12 – 13
  - Hong Kong pro-democracy lawmakers resign en masse, in response to four lawmakers' disqualification made by the government.
  - Typhoon Vamco makes landfall in Vietnam, after crossing the Philippines and killing at least 69 people. The storm causes the worst floods in the region since Typhoon Ketsana in 2009.
  - Western Sahara conflict: fighting erupts between Morocco and the Sahrawi Arab Democratic Republic when Moroccan forces launch a military operation to capture the town of Guerguerat, located in a UN-monitored buffer zone.
- November 15
  - The Regional Comprehensive Economic Partnership (RCEP) is signed by 15 Asia-Pacific countries to form the world's largest free-trade bloc, covering a third of the world's population.
  - NASA and SpaceX launch the SpaceX Crew-1 mission from Kennedy Space Center Launch Complex 39A to the ISS, the first operational flight of the Crew Dragon capsule.
  - Lewis Hamilton wins his seventh Formula One World Drivers' Championship at the 2020 Turkish Grand Prix, equalling the record set by Michael Schumacher in 2004.
- November 16
  - COVID-19 pandemic: The Moderna COVID-19 vaccine is proven to be 94.5% effective against COVID-19 based on interim results, including severe illnesses. The vaccine has been cited as being among those that are easier to distribute as no ultra-cold storage is required.
  - Hurricane Iota makes landfall in Nicaragua as a Category 4 hurricane just two weeks after Hurricane Eta made landfall, devastating the same areas.
- November 17 – COVID-19 pandemic: The number of confirmed cases of COVID-19 passes 55 million worldwide, with around a million cases recorded every two days on average.
- November 18 – COVID-19 pandemic: Pfizer and BioNTech complete trials on their COVID-19 vaccine, with an overall effectiveness rate of 95% without adverse events.
- November 19
  - The Brereton Report into Australian war crimes during the War in Afghanistan is released.
  - Shuggie Bain by Douglas Stuart wins the 2020 Booker Prize.
  - The PlayStation 5 is released worldwide.
- November 22 – The United States withdraws from the Treaty on Open Skies.
- November 23 – COVID-19 pandemic: AstraZeneca's AZD1222 vaccine, developed in collaboration with Oxford University, is shown to be 70% effective in protecting against COVID-19. The efficacy can be raised to 90% if an initial half dose is followed by a full dose a month later, based on interim data.
- November 25 – COVID-19 pandemic: The number of confirmed cases of COVID-19 passes 60 million worldwide.
- November 27 – Iran's top nuclear scientist, Mohsen Fakhrizadeh, is assassinated near Tehran.
- November 28 – Koshobe massacre: Boko Haram terrorists attack a village in Borno, Nigeria, killing 110 people and wounding 6 people.
- November 30
  - A penumbral lunar eclipse occurs; the last of four lunar eclipses in 2020.
  - Protein folding, one of the biggest mysteries in biology, is solved by AlphaFold, an artificial intelligence algorithm developed by DeepMind.
  - COVID-19 pandemic: Moderna files an application for Emergency Use Authorization in the United States after its vaccine achieved an efficacy of 94.1% from full trials without safety concerns. It also plans to do the same in EU soon.

=== December ===
- December 1
  - COVID-19 pandemic: Pfizer and BioNTech announced an Emergency Use Authorization application to the European Medicines Agency.
  - The Arecibo Telescope of the Arecibo Observatory collapses, just weeks after the announcement of its planned demolition.
- December 2
  - COVID-19 pandemic: The United Kingdom approves Pfizer-BioNTech's BNT162b2 vaccine, being the first country in the world to do so.
  - Three activists in Hong Kong were jailed for their roles in the 2019–20 Hong Kong protests, with Joshua Wong getting the heaviest at 13.5 months.
  - The United Nations Commission on Narcotic Drugs votes to remove cannabis from the treaty list of dangerous drugs in recognition of its medical value, although some controls will remain.
- December 4
  - COVID-19 pandemic: The number of confirmed cases of COVID-19 passes 65 million worldwide, with the global death toll exceeding 1.5 million. Figures reflect that, in the last week, over 10,000 people worldwide have died on average every day, with one death every nine seconds. According to the World Health Organization, COVID-19 had caused more deaths in 2020 than tuberculosis in 2019, as well as four times the number of deaths than malaria.
  - Somali Civil War: The United States announces its withdrawal from the conflict over the next month.
- December 5 – COVID-19 pandemic: Russia begins mass vaccination against COVID-19 with the Sputnik V candidate.
- December 6 – The 2020 Venezuelan parliamentary election takes place.
- December 8
  - COVID-19 pandemic: The United Kingdom becomes the first nation to begin a mass inoculation campaign using a clinically authorised, fully tested vaccine, Pfizer–BioNTech COVID-19 vaccine. Margaret Keenan, 90, becomes the first person in the world to receive the Pfizer vaccine after trials.
  - Nepal and China officially agree on Mount Everest's actual height, which is 8,848.86m.
- December 10
  - COVID-19 pandemic: The United States and Saudi Arabia approve the Pfizer–BioNTech COVID-19 vaccine for emergency use, while Argentina approves Sputnik V.
  - Western Sahara conflict, Arab–Israeli conflict: Israel and Morocco normalise diplomatic relations. Simultaneously, the United States reaffirms its previous recognition of Moroccan sovereignty over the Western Sahara and announces plans to build a consulate there.
  - The Nicolas Sarkozy corruption trial concludes in France.
- December 11 – The European Union agrees to reduce greenhouse gas emissions by 55% over the next decade.
- December 12
  - COVID-19 pandemic: The number of confirmed cases of COVID-19 passes 70 million worldwide.
  - Bhutan and Israel normalise diplomatic relations.
- December 14
  - COVID-19 pandemic: The United States and Canada begin mass vaccination with the Pfizer–BioNTech COVID-19 vaccine. In addition, Singapore approves the Pfizer–BioNTech COVID-19 vaccine, with other companies to provide vaccines progressively.
  - Sudan–United States relations: The United States removes Sudan from its list of state sponsors of terrorism.
  - Turkey–United States relations: The United States places sanctions on Turkey in retaliation for their purchase of a S-400 missile system from Russia, marking the first time they have sanctioned a NATO ally.
  - A total solar eclipse is visible from parts of the South Pacific Ocean, southern South America, and the South Atlantic Ocean.
- December 18
  - Media outlets report that astronomers have detected a radio signal, BLC1, apparently from the direction of Proxima Centauri, the closest star to the Sun. Astronomers have stated that this and other, yet unpublished, signals, are thought to likely be "interference that we cannot fully explain" and that it appears to be among the two strongest candidates for a radio signal humanity received from extraterrestrial intelligence so far.
  - COVID-19 pandemic:
    - The number of confirmed cases of COVID-19 passes 75 million worldwide.
    - The United States approves Moderna's vaccine for emergency use, the second brand available there.
- December 20 – COVID-19 pandemic: A highly infectious new strain of SARS-CoV-2 spreading in Europe and Australia provokes international border closures.
- December 21
  - COVID-19 pandemic: 36 cases are reported on the Base General Bernardo O'Higgins Riquelme in the Chilean Antarctic Territory, marking the first infections in Antarctica, the last continent to report infections.
  - A great conjunction of Jupiter and Saturn occurs, with the two planets separated in the sky by 0.1 degrees. This is the closest conjunction between the two planets since 1623.
- December 24
  - The United Kingdom and the European Union agree to a comprehensive free trade agreement prior to the end of the transition period.
  - COVID-19 pandemic: Sinovac's vaccine reached a rate of 91.25% efficacy in trials in Turkey.
- December 27 – COVID-19 pandemic: The number of confirmed cases of COVID-19 passes 80 million worldwide.
- December 29 – The 2020 Petrinja earthquake with a magnitude of 6.4 strikes Croatia, killing seven and injuring more than 20.
- December 30 – COVID-19 pandemic: The United Kingdom approves AstraZeneca-Oxford's vaccine, the second one available. The vaccine is easier to store as it only requires normal fridge temperatures, making distribution easier.
- December 31 – The transition period following the United Kingdom's exit from the European Union on January 31, 2020, expires.

== Nobel Prizes ==
Nobel medal

- Chemistry – Emmanuelle Charpentier and Jennifer Doudna
- Economics – Paul Milgrom and Robert B. Wilson
- Literature – Louise Glück
- Peace – World Food Programme
- Physics – Roger Penrose, Reinhard Genzel and Andrea M. Ghez
- Physiology or Medicine – Harvey J. Alter, Michael Houghton and Charles M. Rice
