= Joseph Foumbi =

Cameroonian diplomat (born 1955)

Joseph Foumbi (born 1955) is a senior United Nations official working for the United Nations Children's Fund (UNICEF).

Born in 1955, Cameroonian by origin, he spent most of his life in France and the United States.

From 2003 to 2006, he was appointed as head of the UNICEF office in Bangui, Central African Republic. During that time, he led efforts to promote the rights of children in the country, and school attendance as well as child nutrition also improved.

In January 2006, Secretary-General Kofi Annan also appointed him as United Nations Resident Coordinator and Humanitarian Coordinator in the country, as successor to Stan Nkwain. In such capacity, he played an important role in advocating to raise funds for humanitarian work in the country, supported by the local OCHA office headed by Souleymane Beye.

In November 2006, he was promoted and appointed as head of UNICEF in Kigali, Rwanda.

Preceded by Stan Nkwain	UN Resident Coordinator, CAR; 2006–2006	Succeeded by Toby Lanzer
Preceded by unknown	UNICEF Representative, CAR; 2003–2006	Succeeded by Mahimbo Mdoe
Preceded by unknown	UNICEF Representative, Rwanda; 2006–current	Succeeded by n/a - incumbent
