= Nkwain =

Nkwain is a Cameroonian surname. Notable people with the surname include:

- Francis Nkwain (1930–2014), Cameroonian politician and educator
- Stan Nkwain (fl. 2003–present), Cameroonian public servant, administrator, and senior UN official in UNDP
