= Koshebe massacre =

2020 massacre in Borno State, Nigeria

- Part of the Boko Haram insurgency
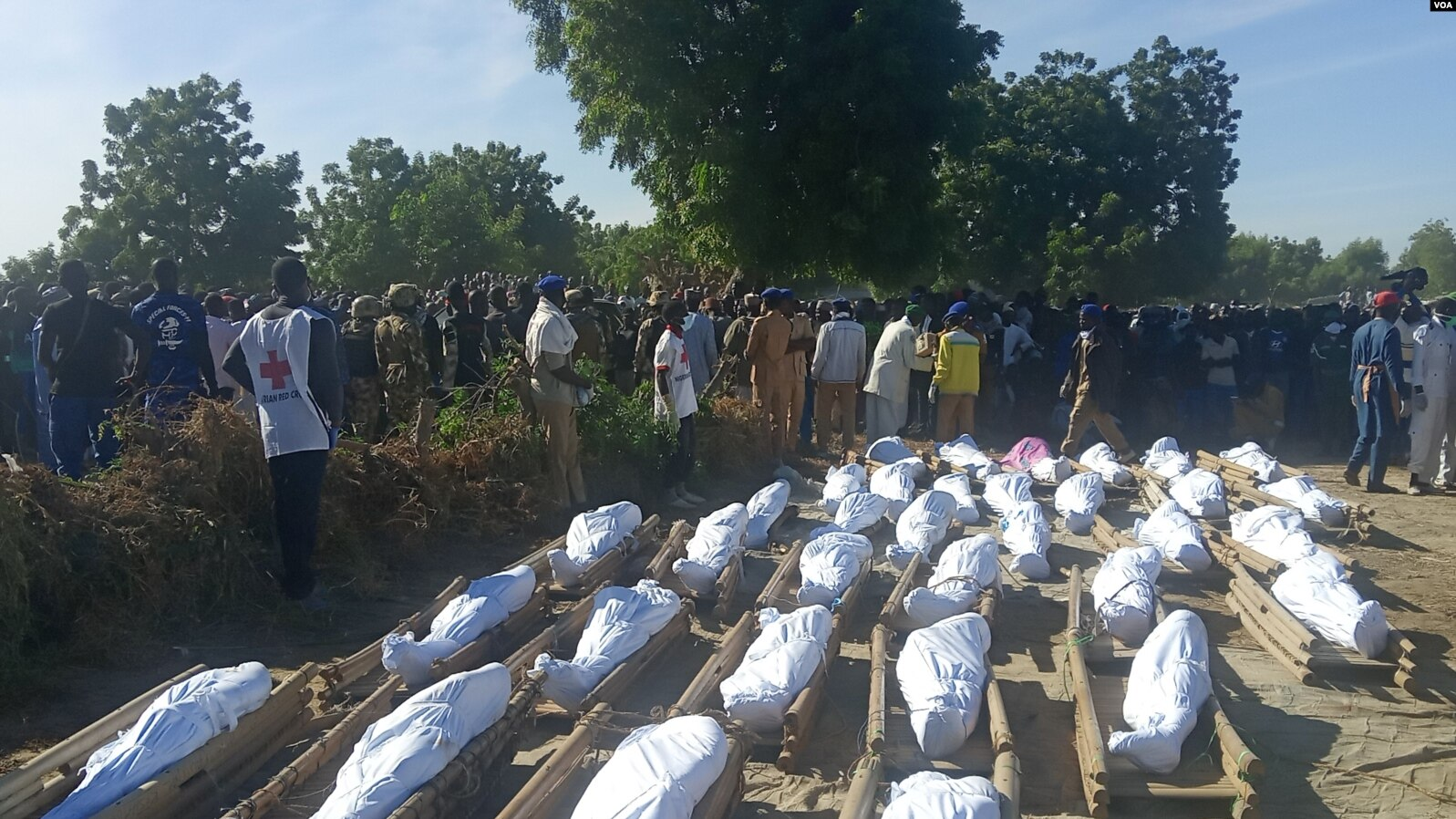
- Funeral of victims of Koshebe massacre

- Location of Koshebe in Nigeria
- Location: 11°58′33″N 13°19′10″E; Koshebe, Borno State, Nigeria
- Date: 28 November 2020
- Attack type: Mass killing, spree killing, terrorism
- Deaths: 110
- Injuries: 6
- Perpetrator: Boko Haram

The Koshebe massacre took place on 28 November 2020 in the village of Koshebe, Nigeria, in Borno State, when as many as 110 civilians and peasant farmers were killed and six were wounded as they worked in rice fields in Koshebe village, near the northeast Nigerian city of Maiduguri. The attack was thought to be carried out by Boko Haram. About 15 women were also kidnapped.

== Background ==
Since the 2009 Boko Haram uprising in northern Nigeria, thousands of people have been killed and thousands more wounded in Nigeria, Niger, Chad and Cameroon. The leader of Boko Haram at the time, Mohammed Yusuf, was killed in Maiduguri, Borno State in 2009.

Boko Haram has killed more than 30,000 since 2009. An attack near the village of Gubio in June 2020 resulted in 81 deaths. In October 2020, Boko Haram carried out two separate attacks in fields near Maiduguri, slitting the throats of 22 farmers.

Flooding in northwest Nigeria earlier in the year destroyed thousands of hectares of rice, and food prices rose substantially in 2020 mainly due to insecurity in food-producing regions.

== Massacre ==
On 28 November 2020, Boko Haram militants slaughtered as many as 110 farm laborers in Koshebe village, located near Borno State's capital Maiduguri. The victims were tied up by the assailants and their throats slit in the village, an anti-Boko Haram militia told AFP news agency. They were laborers from Sokoto State in northwest Nigeria and had traveled more than 1,000 kilometers to the area to find work. The spokesman of the Nigerian president, Garba Shehu, said the laborers did not have permission to work within the region where they were attacked, as the area had not been cleared of Boko Haram. The farmers were in a difficult situation as they were at risk of dying from starvation if they chose to stay at home, but were vulnerable to the insurgents if they ventured into the farmlands.

The attack was due to an incident on 27 November where a Boko Haram gunman, who had been tormenting the farmers, was disarmed and arrested. The gunman ordered the farmers to cook for him, and while some were cooking rice, others struck at the gunman, tied him up and called for security. On 29 November, UN Humanitarian Coordinator Edward Kallon said that armed men had arrived on motorcycles and proceeded to massacre the workers.

== Reactions ==
Nigerian president Muhammadu Buhari condemned the massacre, and expressed grief over the killing of farmers on rice fields at Zabarmari, in Jere Local Government of Borno State, describing the terrorist killings as "...insane". The governor of Borno state, Babagana Umara Zulum, lead the funeral of the victims, and called on the federal government to enlist more soldiers and security force members to protect the farmers.
