= Stan Nkwain =

Cameroonian diplomat

Stanislas Nkwain, a national of Cameroon, is a senior United Nations official working for the United Nations Development Programme (UNDP).

From 2003 to 2005, he was Resident Representative of UNDP in Bangui, Central African Republic, which also entailed the functions of Resident Coordinator and, after the country was declared a humanitarian emergency in 2005, that of Humanitarian Coordinator. He was therefore the seniormost UN official in Central African Republic.

He was notable for attracting attention to the humanitarian emergency in the country, which he called "a forgotten emergency".
