= Land mines in the Falkland Islands =

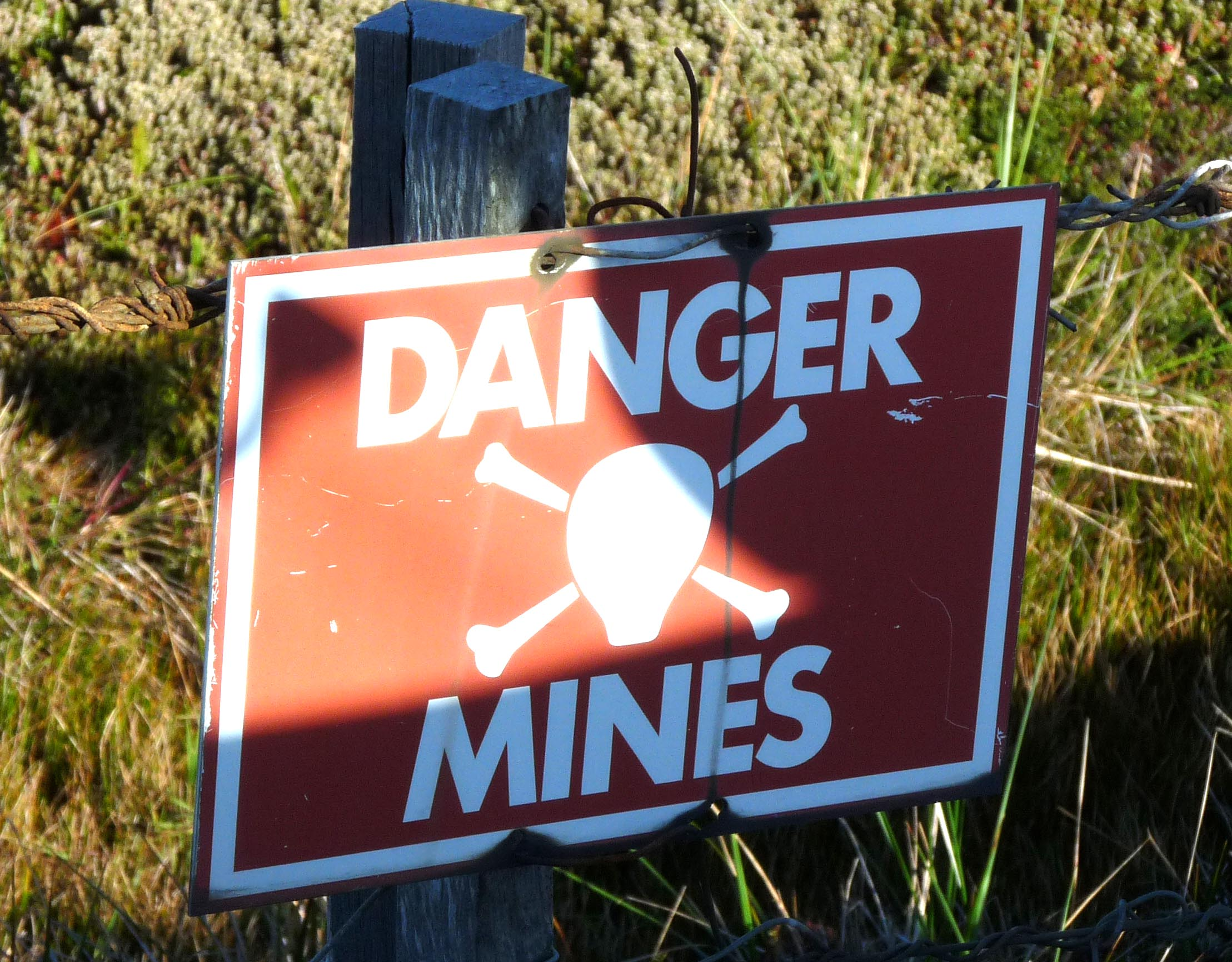
Minefield sign near Stanley, East Falkland

There were approximately 30,000 land mines laid in the British overseas territory of the Falkland Islands by Argentinian forces following their 1982 invasion. Some of the mines were cleared immediately following the successful British operation to retake the islands, but following a series of accidents, demining operations ceased. In the following years the minefields were fenced off and, with human access limited, became havens for Falklands flora and the native penguin population. The British government ratified the Ottawa Treaty in 1998 that required the removal of all mines within its territory. Demining operations, which had to be carried out by hand due to the climate and local condition, restarted in 2009. The last mines were cleared in November 2020.

== Background ==
Argentinian forces invaded the Falkland Islands, a British overseas territory located in the South Atlantic, in April 1982. British forces retook the islands by 14 June in the Falklands War. One of the first actions taken by the Argentinians after the invasion was to lay minefields to assist in the defence of the islands. Despite rumours that land mines were scattered randomly by helicopter, the majority of the minefields seem to have been laid in a professional manner and the locations of individual mines recorded. Approximately 30,000 land mines – of which there were at least 20,000 anti-personnel mines and 5,000 anti-tank devices – were laid in 146 separate minefields. The minefields were focused around Stanley and Goose Green on East Falkland, and Port Howard and Fox Bay on West Falkland.

The United Nations declares that nine different land mines were laid on the Falkland Islands. The anti-tank mines were the Israeli No. 6; the Italian SB-81; the Argentinian FMK-3; the Spanish C-3-A/B and the American M1A1. The anti-personnel mines were the Israeli No. 4; the Italian SB-33; the Argentinian FMK-1 and the Spanish P-4-B. The SB-33 mine has been described as particularly widespread. During demining work a tenth type of land mine was recovered, this was an Argentinean-manufactured copy of the M1A1.

One of the most heavily mined areas was Surf Beach, located just to the north of the capital Stanley, where 1,000 mines were laid just to the rear of the beach. Much of Stanley Common, a public access area, was also mined and remained out of use for many years. One abandoned building, located near the Murrell Peninsula minefield, was suspected of being booby-trapped and fenced off. During the demining operation at least six improvised booby traps were recovered, consisting of tripwires connected to TNT charges.

== Demining ==
=== Initial efforts ===
Initial demining efforts by British and Argentinian engineers began in the weeks following the British victory. The minefields around Goose Green, site of a major engagement in the war, were cleared by the end of 1982. Accidents resulted in six deaths or serious injuries amongst the demining teams and, with many minefields located in non-essential areas, the demining operation was halted in 1983, as the small benefit gained was not considered to be worth the risk. At this point some 20–25,000 land mines remained, split across 117 minefields.

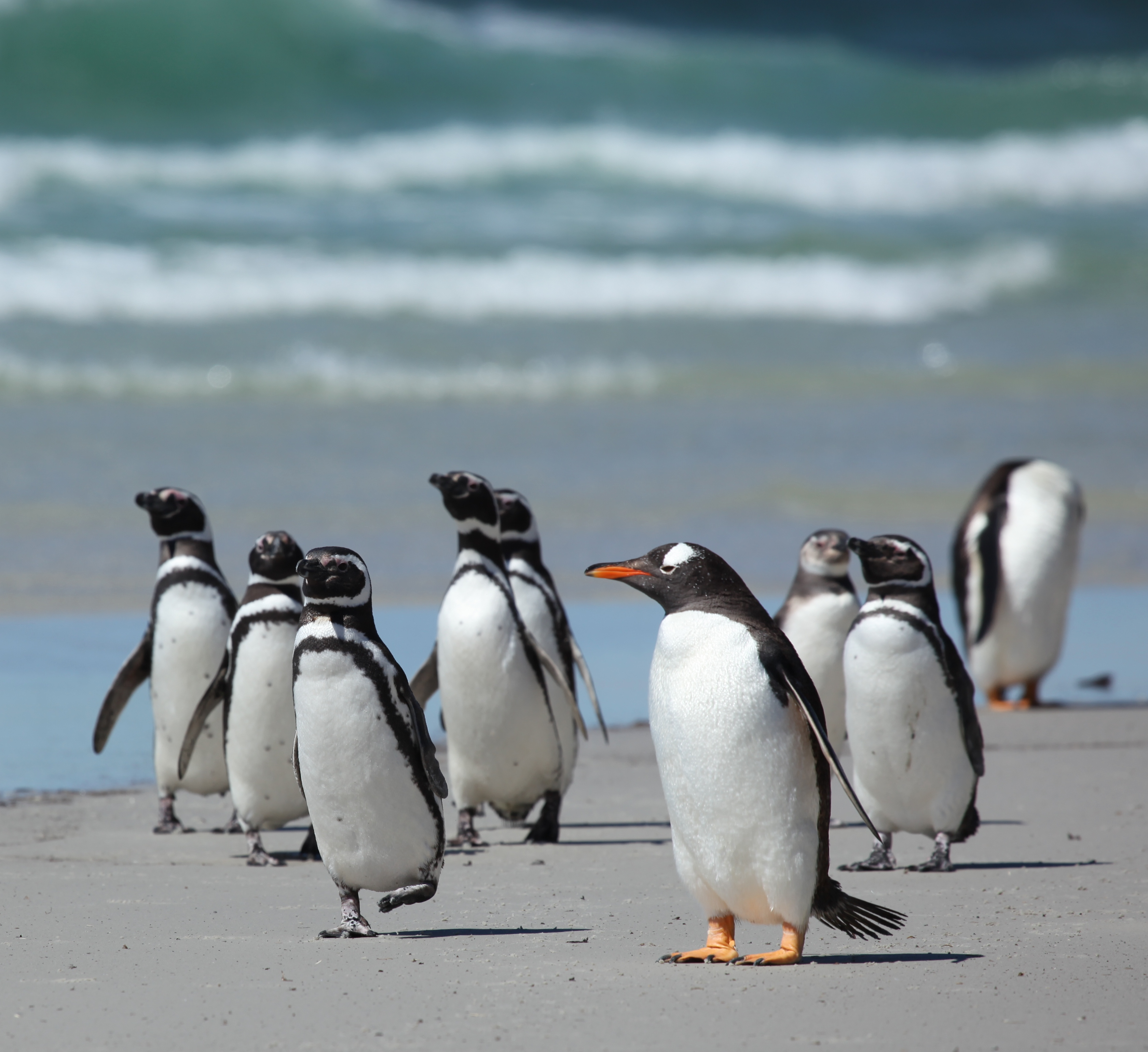
Magellanic and gentoo penguins on the Falklands

Many of the mines laid were well preserved and remained dangerous for decades. Around 80% of mines were in sandy or peat areas, so individual mines, which could have moved from their original locations, were hard to spot. The minefields were signed and fenced, maps were issued and all visitors to the islands briefed on the dangers. As human access had been prevented to these areas they became de facto nature reserves, popular with Magellanic and gentoo penguins, which were too light to trigger the mines. Native flora also thrived in the minefields. The UK government stated that the socio-economic impact of the land mines on the Falklands was negligible. No civilians, not involved in mine clearing work, have ever been wounded by land mines in the Falklands.

=== Later clearing ===
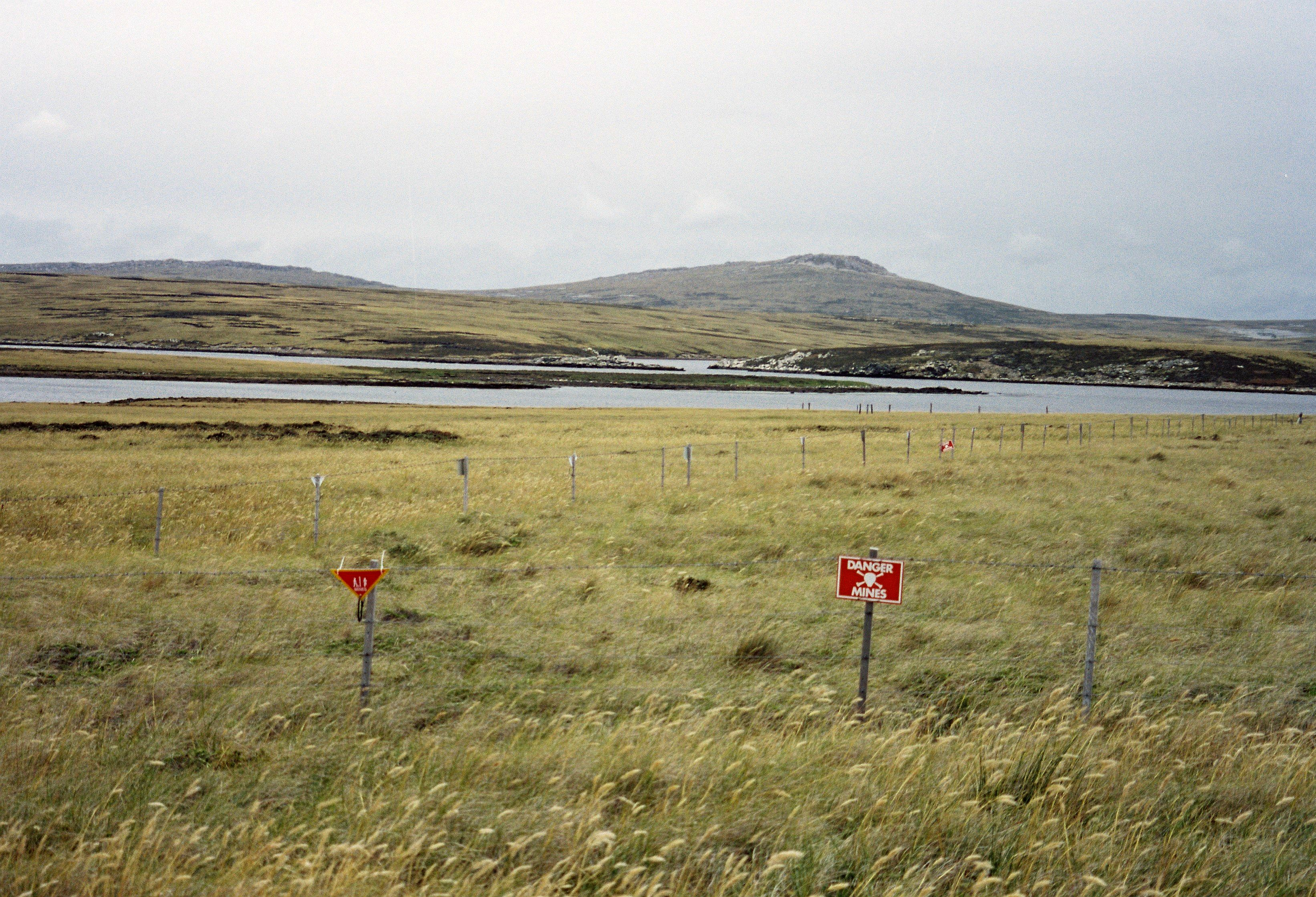
Minefield, fence and signage at Port William

The United Kingdom ratified the Ottawa Treaty that prohibits manufacture and use of land mines on 31 July 1998. The treaty required that the UK clear all land mines from its territories by 1 March 2009. Many of the Falkland Islanders opposed the demining operation. They stated that as the minefields were clearly marked and there was little demand for the land it would be more cost effective and better for the environment for the mines to remain. There were fears that opening up the minefields to tourists and farmers would lead to habitat destruction. Some islanders supported the resumption of demining work as it would allow once popular beaches to return to use.

The Falkland Islands lost their air link to South America, provided through Chile, in March 1999 following the October 1998 arrest of former Chilean president Augusto Pinochet in London. The British subsequently engaged with the Argentine government to improve co-operation in the South Atlantic and, on 14 July 1999, issued the Anglo-Argentine Joint Statement. Under the agreement the Argentines arranged for the air link to Chile to be restored (with occasional flights to Argentina also) in return for the British allowing visits to the Falklands Islands by Argentine nationals. The statement also specified that Argentina and Britain would jointly investigate the removal of mines from the territory. This measure was opposed by the Falklands Islands Government as it would require an Argentine presence on the island.

Britain and Argentina reiterated their commitment to carry out a joint feasibility study on demining in 2001 and 2006. This study was presented to the 2008 Ottawa Treaty Conference in Jordan. The British government commenced unilateral demining operations in 2009. The demining operation was funded by the British Foreign and Commonwealth Office. The Ottawa demining deadline was subsequently amended, at the request of the British government, to 1 March 2019 and then to 1 June 2021, due to the high cost and slow outputs of clearance work.

==== Methodology ====
Owing to the climate, ground conditions and detectability most of the clearance was carried out by specialist civilian deminers manually prodding the ground. The SB-33 mine in particular is described as "almost impossible to detect by any means", owing to its largely plastic construction. In some instances remote controlled mine flails were used to verify that areas were clear of mines, as at Goose Green where manual verification proved difficult. Windy weather prevented the use of mine-detecting rats as had been trialled successfully in Mozambique and Tanzania. Recovered mines are made safe or else disposed of by controlled explosion or burning in small batches.

The manual clearing processes commenced in 2009 with Dynasafe-Bactec (renamed Safelane Global in 2018) carrying out the clearance work and Fenix Insight conducting quality, safety, environmental and progress monitoring. More than 100 demining team members, largely Zimbabwean, were involved in the operation, each working for six-hour days in which they cleared around 5 linear metres (16 feet) of a minefield each. Argentinian mine-laying records and maps created by the British Army's Royal Engineers after the war were used to guide the demining operation. The Argentinian records are not entirely reliable, as they were made at a time of great activity on the Falklands and later translated from Spanish by the British Army. Records for minefields on West Falkland were less complete than those on East Falkland and many required additional intensive surveys to determine the extent and density of mines. Once a minefield was cleared the warning signs were removed and, in most cases, the fences pulled down. After clearance the land was restored, as near as possible, to its previous condition.

One area that proved difficult to clear was Yorke Bay where sand dunes had progressed across the minefield, shifting mines or burying them deeply. This area required large scale excavation and sifting with armoured machinery. Works were carried out in the winter to minimise disruption to the penguin population, who spend that season at sea.

==== Progress ====
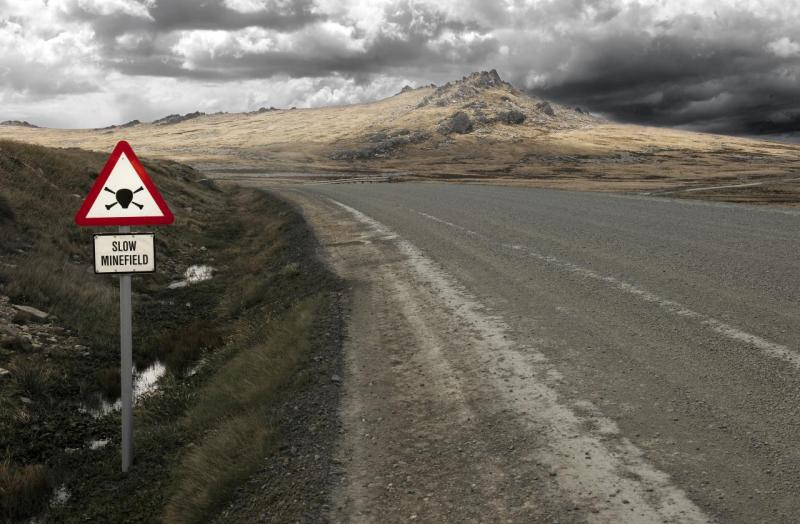
Minefield road sign near Stanley, East Falkland

Early operations were largely focused on the minefields closest to Stanley, many of which were on public-access recreation land. By 2016 the teams had cleared 30 minefields, removing 4,000 anti-personnel and 1,000 anti-tank mines, which allowed 7,000,000 square metres (1,700 acres) of land to be returned to use. By this point all minefields adjacent to main roads, at risk from errant vehicles, had been cleared.

During the 2016/17 season, seven teams cleared 3,000 anti-personnel and 150 anti-tank mines from 47 minefields. By December 2017 70% of all known land mines had been removed. In the same year the UK Foreign and Commonwealth Office and the Ministry of Defence committed a further £20 million of funding for future clearance works, the works had cost £16 million up to that point. One of the demining operatives was injured by an explosion on 27 February 2017 after hitting the side of a mine with a tool. He avoided serious injury, only requiring stitches to his hand and a finger.

In February 2018 Goose Green became the first settlement on the islands to be fully cleared of mines. At the end of 2018 some 35 areas remained to be cleared. These comprised 27 known minefields (totalling 997,930 square metres, 247 acres) and 8 areas suspected to be mined but where an additional technical survey was required (163,460 square metres, 40 acres). The expected completion date for demining operations was March 2020, though this was later extended to December 2020 after removal operations were hindered by the COVID-19 pandemic. The last land mines were lifted in 2020.

The British Foreign Office announced on 10 November 2020 that, as the removal of the final land mines was completed, the country had now fulfilled its obligations under the Anti-Personnel Mine Ban Convention, with no known land mines remaining on any British soil. The formal declaration was made to the Convention at the conference in Geneva on 19 November.

A celebratory event to mark the clearance took place on 14 November at Yorke Bay, which was the final area to be cleared. During that event the last recovered land mines were ceremonially detonated. The demining programme cost £44 million and completed three years ahead of schedule. After completion of the works the UK committed to provide £36 million to fund land mine clearance in other countries, including Zimbabwe. In November 2020 the Argentine government criticised the British operation, claiming that it was a violation of the 1976 United National General Assembly resolution 31/49 that called upon the two countries to "refrain from taking decisions that would imply introducing unilateral modifications in the situation". Argentina had previously raised formal complaints at the annual Ottawa Convention regarding the British operation.

In June 2021 the Executive Council of the Falkland Islands approved the removal of the 77 kilometres (48 mi) of former minefield fencing and associated signage. The works prioritised Fox Bay and Yorke Bay in the first season, moving on to Stanley Common and Murrell Farm in later years. By the end of 2021 Fox Bay West had been cleared, and works near to penguin nesting sites took place outside of their breeding season.

In November 2023, tourists discovered two land mines at Hell's Kitchen beach on the Murrell Peninsula; a further mine was identified by a British military Explosives Ordnance Disposal team. The area had been cleared previously in 2019 and sixteen mines removed. Fenix Insight returned to the site in March 2024 and incinerated the three mines. The team cleared 7,000 square metres (75,000 sq ft) of land by excavation and other areas by metal detectors; the area was regarded as difficult due to the presence of shifting sands. Hell's Kitchen was recertified as mine free in April 2024.
