= Edward Kallon =

United Nations Resident Coordinator and Humanitarian Coordinator in Nigeria

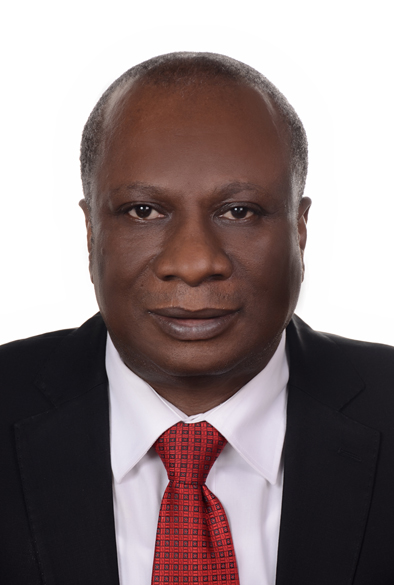
Mr Edward Kallon, UNRC/HC in Nigeria

Edward Kallon (born January 14, 1961, in Sierra Leone), is the United Nations Resident Coordinator and Humanitarian Coordinator in Nigeria. Kallon is also the Resident Representative of the United Nations Development Programme in Nigeria (UNDP). He held a similar position for the past three years in the Hashemite Kingdom of Jordan, where he was also the Representative of the United Nations Population Fund in Jordan (UNFPA) and the Designated Official for Security.

== Career ==
In 2013 Kallon was assigned as Representative and Country Director for the World Food Programme's (WFP) in India. He was WFP's Regional Refugee Emergency Coordinator for Syria for the latter six months of 2012 and UN Resident Coordinator and Humanitarian Coordinator ad interim in Iraq from February–May 2012.

Since 1992, Kallon has had numerous assignments with WFP, including: Representative and Country Director, Iraq (2008–2012); Deputy Country Director, Bangladesh (2005–2008); Deputy Country Director, Uganda (2002–2005); Programme Coordinator, Uganda (2001–2002); Programme Coordinator, Somalia (1998–2001); Programme Officer for Afghanistan, (based in Islamabad) (1995–1998); Head of Sub-Office in Herat, Afghanistan (1992–1994).

From 1990 to 1992. Kallon was a UN Volunteer, assigned to WFP in Kabul.

Before his career began with the UN, he worked in his home country as a Socio-Economist and Community Development Coordinator for GTZMANR (1988–1990) and with Plan International during 1986 as Income Generation Project Coordinator.

== Education ==
Kallon holds a master's degree in Development Studies with a specialization in Agriculture and Rural Development from the Institute of Social Studies in the Netherlands and a Bachelor of Science in Agricultural Education from Njala University College, University of Sierra Leone.
