= Humanitarian Coordinator =

Senior-most United Nations official in a country

The Humanitarian Coordinator is the senior-most United Nations official in a country experiencing a humanitarian emergency. The Humanitarian Coordinator is appointed by the United Nations Emergency Relief Coordinator when a new emergency occurs or an existing humanitarian situation "worsens in degree and/or complexity".

In most cases, the function is performed by the United Nations Resident Coordinator.

The Humanitarian Coordinator is supported in almost every case by a local OCHA Office.

== Role of the Humanitarian Coordinator ==
=== Leadership: The Humanitarian Coordinator and Humanitarian Country Team ===
When a humanitarian crisis occurs, the United Nations Office for Coordination of Humanitarian Affairs (UN OCHA) strives to efficiently mobilize and coordinate aid. The leader of the UN OCHA, the Emergency Relief Coordinator (ERC), appoints a Humanitarian Coordinator (HC) (also known as the Resident Coordinator (RC) within the country of crisis to establish and lead the Humanitarian Country Team (HCT). The HCT's job is to assess the situation, identify and prioritize the needs of victims, and estimate the capacity of the country and its people to respond.

=== Purpose: The Importance of Identifying and Prioritizing Needs ===
In Goma during 1994, many of the failures in aid can be attributed to duplicated services from international aid organizations and wasted resources. The Sphere Project was created after that event in order to create a more coherent system of humanitarian aid organizations that could be mobilized when needed. Before aid is sent, the HC and HCT perform an initial assessment in order to determine which clusters of aid organizations should be recommended for activation within the country. This way, only the aid that is needed as determined by the HC is sent to the country.

=== Assessment: Methods for Prioritizing Needs ===
The HC appoints a team of emergency specialists to perform a multi-cluster initial rapid assessment (MIRA) during the first weeks of a crisis. The team's primary goals are to create a Preliminary Scenario Definition after 72 hours and a full MIRA report after two weeks that informs humanitarian stakeholders of what resources are needed to address basic needs. Recommended criteria for the reports include descriptions of the general situation of the population, the geographic spread of the disaster, the current state of health problems and infrastructure, and data on the abundance and quality of food, water, shelter, safety, education, and coordination. This information is gathered through traditional surveys, call detail records, and migration models using mobile phone usage patterns. New technologies such as mobile Vulnerability Analysis and Mapping (mVAM) have also been recently developed in order to more efficiently collect information remotely from victims of the crisis via text, voice calls, and an interactive voice response system. These types of technologies have been fairly effective since they are able to collect data offline and then upload information once they reach an area of active WIFI during a humanitarian crisis. This has led to a larger and more detailed body of data that help humanitarian relief managers “fine-tune interventions and prioritize resources on the basis of a bird's eye view of the operation.” Through these improvements in assessment tools within the MIRA process, the HC is more capable of effectively submitting recommendations to the ERC concerning which cluster groups of aid organizations should be recruited to provide resources and assist victims.

== Current Humanitarian Coordinators ==
Country	Duty Station	Full Name	Position
Afghanistan	Kabul	Indrika Ratwatte	DSRSG/RC/HC
Burkina Faso	Ouagadougou	Maurica Azonnankpo	RC/HC OiC
Cameroon	Yaoundé	Issa Sanogo	RC/HC
Central African Republic	Bangui	Mohamed Ag Ayoya	DSRSG/RC/HC
Chad	N'Djamena	François Batalingaya	RC/HC
Colombia	Bogotá	Mireia Villar Forner	RC/HC
Democratic Republic of the Congo	Kinshasa	Bruno Lemarquis	DSRSG/RC/HC
Eritrea	Asmara	Nahla Valji	RC/HC
Ethiopia	Addis Ababa	Aboubacar Kampo	RC/HC OiC
Haiti	Port Au Prince	Nicole Kouassi	DSRSG/RC/HC
Iraq	Baghdad	Ghulam Isaczai	DSRSG/RC/HC
Lebanon	Beirut	Imran Riza	DSC/RC/HC
Mali	Bamako	Hanaa Singer	RC/HC
Mozambique	Maputo	Catherine Sozi	RC/HC
Myanmar	Yangon	Gwyn Lewis	RC/HC a.i.
Niger	Niamey	Mama Keita	RC/HC
Nigeria	Abuja	Mohamed Fall	RC/HC
Pakistan	Islamabad	Mohamed Yahya	RC/HC
Palestine	Jerusalem	Ramiz Alakbarov	DSC/RC/HC
Somalia	Mogadishu	George Conway	DSRSG/RC/HC
South Sudan	Juba	Anita Kiki Gbeho	DSRSG/RC/HC
Sudan	Port Sudan	Denise Brown	RC/HC
Syrian Arab Republic	Damascus	Nathalie Fustier	RC/HC a.i.
Ukraine	Kiev	Matthias Schmale	RC/HC
Venezuela	Caracas	Gianluca Rampolla del Tindaro	RC/HC
Yemen	Sana'a	Julien Harneis	RC/HC
Zimbabwe	Harare	Edward Kallon	RC/HC
