= La Línea (tunnel) =

Road tunnel in Colombia

Coordinates: 4°26′47.51″N 75°31′15.81″W

La Línea (English: The Line) is a highway tunnel between the cities of Calarcá, Quindío and Cajamarca, Tolima in Colombia. It crosses beneath the locally famous "Alto de La Línea" in the Cordillera Central or central range of the Andes mountains, easing traffic on one of Colombia's main east-west road connections (the National Route 40) which links Bogotá with Cali and the Pacific port of Buenaventura. It is the longest road tunnel in the Americas, well ahead of the 4,100-meter (13,300 ft) Anton Anderson Memorial Tunnel which is the longest road tunnel in North America. The total length of the tunnel is 8,652 m (28,386 feet), its western entrance being at 2,420 m (7,940 feet) above msl, 19 km (12 miles) east of the city of Armenia and the eastern one at 2,505 m (8,219 feet) above msl, at 37.8 km (23.5 miles) west of Ibagué. Constructions of the pilot tunnel started on 30 September 2004 and both sides of the pilot met on 2 August 2008. In September 2007 Ministry of Transport launched the tender process for the construction of tunnel and connecting roads. Construction work started in December 2008 in head of Union Temporal Segundo Centenario led by Carlos Collins and was originally expected to finish in 2016. In May 2016, the opening was delayed to 2018. The tunnel was finally opened on 4 September 2020, after 14 years of construction work, at a total cost of around 1 trillion pesos (US$270 million).

== Benefits ==
Trajectory of the tunnel.

Some of the benefits include lower operation costs for transportation, shorter travel time and reduction in the number of accidents. Due to the difficult terrain that will be avoided, US$37 million should be saved in operating costs in the first year. Furthermore, travel time will decrease as average speed increases from its current 18.2 km/h (11.3 mph) to 60 km/h (37 mph). For heavy vehicles, travel times can be decreased by 80 minutes, and 40 minutes for light vehicles. This section is also currently one of the stretches in the country most prone to accidents (four times the national average) due to its geography and climate. The tunnel could bring the accident rate down to the average. Total economic benefits are estimated to be US$40 million per annum.
