= C-3-A/B mine =

Spanish anti-tank blast mines

The Expal C-3-A and C-3-B are round Spanish rubber modified polystyrene cased anti-tank blast mines. The mines differ only in minor detail. The mine is classified as a minimum metal mine, the only metal it contains being a 4.5 millimetre diameter zinc-plated steel spring. The mine is found in Angola, the Falkland Islands, and the Western Sahara. The mines are vulnerable to the plastic cases deteriorating in bright sunlight, resulting in a reduction in activation pressure.

== Specifications ==
- Weight: 5.7 kg
- Explosive content: 5 kg of TNT/RDX/Aluminium (50/30/20)
- Diameter: 290 mm
- Height: 60 mm
- Operating pressure: 275 kg
