= Resident Coordinator =

United Nations official

The United Nations Resident Coordinator (RC) is the highest-ranking representative of the United Nations (UN) development system in a country. The RC leads the United Nations Country Team (UNCT) and coordinates UN support to countries to implement the 2030 Agenda for Sustainable Development. The RC is the designated representative of the Secretary-General at the country level and reports to the Secretary-General.

The Resident Coordinator system brings together all United Nations entities carrying out operational activities for development at the country level, regardless of the nature of their presence in the country. At the country level, the system comprises the RC, the UNCT and the Resident Coordinator's Office (RCO). The United Nations Development Coordination Office supports the system at the regional and global levels.

== Responsibilities ==
The RC represents the United Nations at the highest levels of government and engages with civil society, bilateral and multilateral partners, academia and the private sector. In consultation with the host Government, the RC leads the UNCT in developing, implementing, monitoring and reporting on the United Nations Sustainable Development Cooperation Framework. The RC also coordinates operational activities for development of the United Nations in support of national implementation of the 2030 Agenda; promotes the values, standards and principles of the Charter of the United Nations, including human rights, gender equality and the principle of 'Leaving No One Behind'; and provides strategic direction and oversight for the Resident Coordinator's Office.

== Humanitarian and mission settings ==
When international humanitarian assistance is required and no separate Humanitarian Coordinator (HC) has been designated, the RC leads and coordinates the response efforts of United Nations entities and other relevant humanitarian actors. An RC may be designated as HC by the Emergency Relief Coordinator, in which case the official serves as RC/HC. In conflict and post-conflict settings, the RC also promotes coordination and coherence between the work of the UNCT and that of United Nations peacekeeping or political missions. In integrated mission settings, the RC also serves as Deputy Special Representative of the Secretary-General (DSRSG) or Deputy Special Coordinator (DSC).

== 2019 reform ==
On 1 January 2019, the RC function was formally separated from that of the Resident Representative of the United Nations Development Programme, and the reformed RC system was placed within the United Nations Secretariat. General Assembly resolution 72/279 endorsed the repositioning of the United Nations development system that led to this reform.
