= Kordofan campaign (2023–present) =

Ongoing military offensive in Sudan

- Part of Sudanese civil war (2023–present)
- Military situation as of 3 October 2026 Controlled by Sudanese Armed Forces and allies (Transitional Sovereignty Council) Controlled by RSF (Government of Peace and Unity) Controlled by SPLM–N (al-Hilu) (New Sudan) Controlled by allied RSF and SPLM–N (al-Hilu) (Government of Peace and Unity and New Sudan)
Date	15 April 2023 – present (3 years, 7 months and 6 days)
Location	Kordofan states (North, South, and West)
Status	Ongoing
Territorial changes	Rapid Support Forces control parts of North Kordofan; SPLM-N (al-Hilu) controls smaller parts of South Kordofan; The SAF breaks the sieges in the Battle of Dilling and Battle of Kadugli; RSF captures all of West Kordofan until November 2026; SAF recaptures most of North Kordofan.; SAF enters west Kordofan after capturing the remaining areas near el obeid

Belligerents
Government of Peace and Unity (since Apr. 2025); RSF; New Sudan; SPLM-N (al-Hilu) (since Feb. 2025)	Sudanese government; Sudanese Armed Forces; Al-Bara' ibn Malik Battalion; Joint Darfur Force (from 2026); Otoro resistance groups	New Sudan; SPLM-N (al-Hilu) (Jun. 2023 – Feb. 2025)

Commanders and leaders
Abdul Rahim Dagalo; Salih Al-Foti; Abu Lulu; Ali Al-Savanna (until May 2026); Hamid Fadlallah †; Ibrahim al-Sharif †; Abdul-Rahman Difallah †; Al-Sadiq Makin †; Haj Hussein †; Hibu Al-Salami (POW); Folgank †; Abdelaziz al-Hilu (since Feb. 2025)	Shams al-Din Khabbashi; Ali Al-Savanna (from May 2026); Abdullah Muhammad al-Dagal †; Ibrahim al-Tom Jali †; Muhannad Ibrahim Fadl †; Abdelmajid al-Haj †; Fadlallah al Tom; Faisal al Hassan; Ahmed Ali; Jau Kafi; Kafi Tayar al-Badeen; Malik al-Burof	Abdelaziz al-Hilu (Jun. 2023 – Feb. 2025)

Units involved
Ethiopian mercenaries	5th Infantry Division; 91st Infantry Brigade; 92nd Infantry Brigade (surrendered); 22nd Infantry Division; Reserve Forces	Unknown

Casualties and losses
+9 killed 13 vehicles destroyed Per SAF: +26 killed 15 vehicles destroyed	+43 killed 33 captured Per RSF: +70 killed 235 vehicles destroyed or captured	Unknown
- Over 1,725 killed, including 646 from famine Over 76 families and 64,000 people displaced

The Kordofan campaign is the theater of the War in Sudan that takes place in the 3 states that make up the Kordofan region: North Kordofan, South Kordofan and West Kordofan. The campaign began on 15 April 2023, when the RSF claimed to have taken control of the airport in El Obeid, happening on the same day that the war began. Multiple major battles have been fought, including the Siege of El Obeid and the Battle of Kadugli.

The offensive has been marked by heavy fighting between both sides due to the strategic location it provides to Darfur, as well as its access to oilfields like Heglig.

== Background ==
On 15 April 2023, RSF forces attacked SAF units and took control of various areas around Sudan's capital, Khartoum, beginning the Sudanese civil war. Clashes were reported across several parts of the city, including Khartoum International Airport and the Presidential Palace. Clashes were also reported in the city of El Fasher and Nyala in Darfur, beginning the Darfur campaign.

== Campaign ==
=== 2023 ===
==== El Obeid ====
The beginning of the Kordofan Campaign was on 15 April, when the RSF claimed to have seized control of the El Obeid Airport. Explosions were later heard in the city on 20 April, while clashes persisted into the next day, resulting in an IOM employee being killed in the crossfire.

On 1 June, officials from the World Food Programme stated that enough food to feed 4.4 million people was stolen from their warehouses in the city. On 11 June, it was reported that El Obeid was under siege by the RSF. The SAF conducted its first airstrikes on RSF positions in the city on 14 June. Clashes resumed between the RSF and SAF on 9 July. The SAF claimed that the 5th Infantry Division killed 26 paramilitaries and destroyed two combat vehicles belonging to the RSF in the Farajallah area in the city on 11 August. Fourteen people were killed in clashes between the SAF and RSF on 30 August.

On 17 September, the SAF and RSF clashed again in El Obeid, with the army inflicting losses on the RSF's forces outside the city. The RSF then retaliated by shelling the city causing civilian casualties. Four more people were killed in clashes on 8 October.

==== SPLM–N involvement ====
The Sudan People's Liberation Movement–North began mobilizing its forces around the city of Kadugli and South Kordofan on 8 June, taking control of army bases despite having a ceasefire agreement with the SAF. This then led to the SPLM–N breaking the ceasefire and attacking SAF forces in the region on 21 June, including in Kadugli and Dalang, with the RSF later attacking Dalang as well. The SAF claimed to have repelled all the attacks. The SPLM–N was reported to have temporarily taken control of the town's police station and claimed control over the road connecting it to Kadugli.

The SPLM–N seized control of the SAF's bases in Servaya, El Tagola, and Um Heitan in South Kordofan on 3 July. On 9 July, the SPLM–N blocked the road from Karkal to Kadugli. They then seized control of Karkaraya oil field near Dalang and attacked the SAF's 14th Infantry Headquarters in Kadugli with Katyusha rockets on 15 July. On 28 July, the SAF retreated from Mardis, its last stronghold in the Dalami area in the Habila, due to the SPLM–N (al-Hilu) presence. One child was killed and three more were injured by SPLM–N shelling on SAF positions in Kadugli on 29 July. Clashes occurred again in Kadugli on the 69th founding anniversary of the SAF on 14 August. The SAF later attacked SPLM–N positions east of Kadugli Airport and in the mountains behind Hajar El Mek on 25 August. Fighting between the SAF and the SPLM–N (al-Hilu) broke out in Kahliyat, South Kordofan on 27 August. The SPLM–N (al-Hilu) attacked SAF positions in Dalami, South Kordofan. The SPLM–N attacked an SAF base in Kadugli on 3 September. The SAF later repelled an attack on Kadugli from the SPLM–N on 27 September.

On 24 October, the SPLM–N (al-Hilu) attacked the town of Lagawa, West Kordofan. Four people were killed after the RSF attacked and destroyed the village of Tukma, which hosted a garrison of the SPLM–N (al-Hilu), in South Kordofan on 5 December.

==== Elsewhere ====
The SAF claimed that RSF forces in the city of Kadugli had surrendered and the base there had been seized on 15 April. The RSF reportedly took control of Wad Banda in West Kordofan on 25 April, and clashes in the state continued into the next day. Clashes continued into the next day, with fighter jets reportedly being used.

Reports on 21 June said that the RSF had taken control of the Teiba military base near Dibebad in clashes that left 40 SAF personnel and four paramilitaries dead. Thirty-three SAF personnel were also taken prisoner. On 5 July, the RSF attacked and pillaged the town of Bara in North Kordofan. The RSF reportedly ambushed and dispersed an SAF convoy north of Dalang in South Kordofan on 16 July. Clashes between the RSF and Kababish tribe in North Kordofan left 41 people dead on 22 July. 2 people were later killed when the RSF plundered the town of Um Rawaba.

At least four paramilitaries and an unknown number of civilians and soldiers were killed in clashes in Um Rawaba on 1 August. The Governor of North Kordofan announced a curfew from 19:00 to 05:00 and banned the use of motorcycles and electric scooters throughout the state following recent clashes on 2 August. UNISFA said that one of its helicopters was attacked in Kadugli on 10 August. Fighting broke out between the SAF and the RSF in the town of Al-Fulah, West Kordofan, resulting in the looting of government facilities, banks and other offices on 16 August.

The RSF retreated from Um Rawaba, North Kordofan on 13 September. On 1 October, RSF claimed to have seized the SAF garrison in Wad Ashana and attacked another at Kilometer 44, west and southwest of Um Rawaba. Four people were killed in clashes between the SAF and armed residents from the Misseriya tribe in Muglad, West Kordofan on 4 October. On the morning of 30 October, the RSF commanded by Hussein Barsham claimed to have taken the Balila oilfield and its airport in West Kordofan, along with 15 SAF vehicles before withdrawing in the evening. It also accused the SAF of burning the airport, while 16 people wearing "military uniforms" were reported killed.

Seven people were killed in SAF bombing in El Hamra, North Kordofan on 20 November. The RSF reportedly took control of an administrative unit in El Odeya, West Kordofan, following the withdrawal of SAF forces in the area on 23 November. The RSF attacked the SAF garrison near Babanusa, West Kordofan, the next day. 4 people were killed in an SAF airstrike in Kokoti, North Kordofan on 2 December. 5 more people were killed in SAF airstrikes in Jabra al-Sheikh, North Kordofan on 7 December. The RSF seized control of Habila, South Kordofan on 31 December.

=== 2024 ===
The RSF attacked the town of Bara, North Kordofan on 2 January.

==== Babanusa ====
5 people were killed in clashes between the SAF and the RSF in Donki El Omda, west of Babanusa on 22 January. Eight others were killed in SAF airstrikes in villages west of Muglad. 2 days later, the RSF launched an offensive to seize Babanusa and the garrison of the SAF's 22nd Infantry Division in the city. At least 23 people were reported to have been killed while 30 others were injured. Sudan War Monitor reported that the RSF had taken over most of Babanusa and indicated that its fighters had penetrated the headquarters of the SAF's 22nd Infantry Division on 26 January. A temporary ceasefire was declared in Babanusa at the end of the month to allow the evacuation of civilians following mediation by the Misseriya paramount chief, Mukhtar Babu Nimr, and other tribal leaders.

5 people were killed in an RSF raid on the village of El Doudiya, West Kordofan on 7 March. Four paramilitaries were subsequently killed after being pursued by armed residents into Um Samima, North Kordofan on the same day. Three people were killed in an SAF airstrike in Shuaa, West Kordofan on 22 March.

Over 100 people were killed on 8 April in attacks by the RSF on SPLM–N (al-Hilu) controlled villages in South Kordofan. Shelling in El Obeid on 18 April killed one person. On 7 May, the SAF claimed to have retaken the Jabal al-Ain military base and the nearby village of Abu al-Ghar, 20 kilometers east of El Obeid, from the RSF, as well as the headquarters of the Police Central Reserve Forces in the city. Both the SAF and the RSF also claimed control of Mount Kordofan, 20 kilometers east of El Obeid. 15 people were later killed in an RSF attack on the Abu Haraz market in El Obeid on 12 May. The RSF claimed to have taken Um Rawaba, North Kordofan, for a second time on 19 May. On 9 June, the SAF claimed to have broken the RSF siege on the 22nd Infantry Division garrison in Babanusa, in addition to retaking the Al-Salam, Al-Posta, and Al-Sikka neighbourhoods as well as the city's markets.

==== Al-Fulah ====
On 20 June, the RSF, led by commander Salih Al-Foti, captured Al-Fulah, the capital of West Kordofan, from the SAF after some fighting which started the previous day. The 91st Infantry Brigade retreated from the city towards Babanusa, allowing the RSF to take control over several other key areas in the state, including Al-Meiram, which was captured on 5 July after the city's garrison fled to South Sudan. Dozens of civilians were left dead or wounded and 60% of the city's population fled. Videos also emerged showing RSF fighters executing tens of military detainees, as well as alleged Ethiopian mercenaries raising their country's flag in the city.

23 people were killed in an RSF attack on a merchants' convoy travelling from Fanquqa to Um Sumaima in North Kordofan on 13 July. Clashes broke out between the SAF and the SPLM–N (al-Hilu) on 18 August in Kador, South Kordofan, after SAF warplanes reportedly dropped military supplies on an SPLM–N camp by accident. Reports said that the SPLM–N camp was taken by the SAF following the fighting.

On 5 October, at least 30 people were killed and more than 100 others were injured in SAF airstrikes on Hamrat al-Sheikh and Abu Zuama in North Kordofan. At least 20 people were killed in an RSF attack on the village of Al-Damukiya, near El Obeid on 8 October. The Sudanese government began airlifting humanitarian aid towards Kadugli and Junud in South Kordofan in November. On 4 November, three people, including two militia leaders and a police officer, were killed in clashes between police and the Reserve Forces, a tribal militia allied with the SAF, in En Nahud, West Kordofan. The RSF launched drone attacks on Wad Ashana in North Kordofan on 17 December.

=== 2025 ===
The SAF retook Karkaraia and Hajar al-Jawad, on the road between Dalang and Kadugli in South Kordofan, from the SPLM–N (al-Hilu) on 13 January. On 30 January, the SAF retook the city of Umm Ruwaba in North Kordofan, advancing towards El Obeid. They also shot down ten drones over El Obeid The SAF took control of the city of Er Rahad in North Kordofan on 17 February, as well as Sidra 2 days later.

7 people were killed in an RSF attack on Al Khiwai, West Kordofan on 9 March. The RSF claimed to have taken Lagawa in West Kordofan on 23 March. On 31 March, the RSF claimed to have taken Khor El Dalaib in South Kordofan following clashes that left 12 civilians dead. It also claimed to have killed 70 fighters of the Islamic Movement, and destroyed or captured 13 vehicles. Several people were killed on 7 April in a joint RSF and SPLM–N (al-Hilu) attack in Rashad, South Kordofan.

On 1 May, the RSF took En Nahud in West Kordofan, killing 19 people. The SAF retook the towns of Al-Khuwayyi in West Kordofan and Al-Hamadi in South Kordofan from the RSF on 11 and 13 May. 10 people were killed by SPLM–N (al-Hilu) shelling in Kadugli, while the SAF took Al-Tareeda and Al-Dakka in Qadeer, South Kordofan, from the SPLM–N (al-Hilu) on 16 May. The SAF retook the Um Libana area in West Kordofan on 19 May. The SAF and its allies then announced the capture of Ed Dubeibat in South Kordofan on 23 May.

On 7 June, the RSF and the SPLM–N (al-Hilu) took the town of Um Dehilib, South Kordofan. The SAF captured Al-Riash and Kazgali in North Kordofan from the RSF on 7 July. Muhannad Ibrahim Fadl, commander of the SAF-allied Al-Bara' ibn Malik Battalion, was killed in an RSF ambush on an SAF reconnaissance unit west of El Obeid on 20 August. On 22 August, The SAF claimed to have destroyed 130 RSF combat vehicles and captured 92 others following clashes in Abu Qawad, near El Obeid.

The SAF claimed to have retaken Kazgeil and Fartangoul in North Kordofan from the RSF on 7 September. On 8 September, Al-Sadiq Makin, a senior RSF commander in Kordofan, was killed during clashes with the SAF in Kazgeil. The SAF retook Bara in North Kordofan from the RSF 2 days later. On 13 September, the RSF took the village of al-Ayyara in North Kordofan, pushing back the SAF to the outskirts of El Obeid, and later claimed to have retaken Kazgeil and Al-Riash in North Kordofan two days later.

On 16 November, the SAF announced that the army had recaptured the areas of Kazqil and Um Dam Haj Ahmed in North Kordofan from the RSF. The next day, the SAF retook Bara from the RSF following a two-week siege before retreating again.

==== Fall of Babanusa and Heglig ====
On 25 November, the SAF claimed to have repelled an RSF assault on the 22nd Infantry Division headquarters in Babanusa after mediation efforts collapsed between them. Then on December 1 the RSF captured the 22nd Infantry Division headquarters in Babanusa and claimed full control over the city. The commander of the SAF's 22nd Infantry Division, Major-General Abdelmajid al-Haj, and an unidentified brigadier general who commanded the SAF's 170th Artillery Brigade were later killed in an RSF ambush while retreating from Babanusa towards Heglig. Then on 8 December, the RSF seized control over the Heglig oil field when the SAF retreated. Seven members of a Misseriya tribal delegation and several dozen RSF fighters were later killed in a SAF drone strike on Heglig. The South Sudan People's Defence Forces later deployed personnel to secure the Heglig oilfield following an agreement between South Sudanese president Salva Kiir, General al-Burhan, and Hemedti to secure vital energy infrastructure in the area that saw the withdrawal of both the SAF and the RSF.

On 30 November, the SAF retook the villages of Tabassa, Al-Damira, Al-Shawaya, Al-Jubailat, Al-Sanadra, Gurdud and Jama in South Kordofan from the SPLM–N (al-Hilu). The SPLM–N (al-Hilu) claimed to have retaken the town of Qardoud Nama in South Kordofan from the SAF, while The SAF retook the town of Mabsouta from the SPLM–N (al-Hilu). Until then, the group had occupied the area since 2011.

=== 2026 ===
The beginning few months saw an increase in drone attacks within the region. On January 3, the RSF carried out drone strikes on El Obeid, with a drone hitting a power station and leaving the city without electricity. The RSF and allied groups also claimed to have taken El Bardab, north of Kadugli.

On March 5, 2026, following fierce fighting, the SAF regained control of the town of Bara in North Kordofan, which had previously been captured by the RSF in October 2025. The RSF reoccupied the town on 16 March.

==== Liberation of Dilling and Kadugli ====
The liberation of Dilling occurred on January 27, 2026, after the city has been in a siege for two years, eight months and three days (21 June 2023 – 24 February 2026), and the liberation Kaduqli of happened after the Kadugli ended on 3 February 2026 after two years, eight months and ten days. One month after that, the RSF restarted the Siege of Kadugli again due to the RSF capture of the town of El Kuweik in South Kordofan state. '

==== North Kordofan offensive (July–present) ====
By the end of July 2026, the SAF launched attacks on RSF positions across North Kordofan state. With the offensive being successful, the SAF seized full control of the highway from El Obeid to Khartoum, recapturing towns such as Bara and Gabrat al Sheikh.

On 6 September 2026, SAF recaptured Hamrat al-Wiz. "The army, the Joint Force, and Special Task units have liberated Hamrat al-Wiz and expelled the RSF," field commander Malik al-Burof said during a video recorded outside the police headquarters in Hamrat al-Wiz. He also claimed the army will be preparing a ground offensive to seize control of final RSF footholds in the region, including Sodari, a large locality in North Kordofan. The offensive has already taken place with drone strikes against RSF bases, mobile units, and convoys across western areas of Northern Kordofan. These developments make it harder for the RSF to lay a full siege to El Obeid.

By 7 September, the SAF liberated six more areas in North Kordofan after driving back the RSF inflicting heavy casualties. SAF confirmed control of Al-Safiya and moved towards the areas of Sodari and Hamrat al-Sheikh. The SAF also retook Al-Mazroub after RSF withdrawal. Large groups of RSF fighters had raised the white flag in areas northwest and west of the recent lost area Hamrat al-Wiz.

The next day on 8 September, the RSF operated a drone strike in Umm Ruwaba, an area the RSF formally controlled, striking a court house. The incident killed 13 civilians and injured 20 others. The Special Operations Forces reported 30 trucks carrying RSF fighters changed into civilian clothes and abandoned their weaponry. The trucks were heading from North Kordofan to Darfur. In addition, the SAF sent reinforcements to the front with sources indicating large numbers of ground troops backed by armored vehicles and advanced weapons, along with specialized units.

On 18 September, the SAF recaptured 11 more areas, including Kajmar, Sharshar, Al Baniyah al Kuraniyah, Al Qulayat, Awlad Hamzah, Magwildat, Rayshan, Al-Qaa, Ghabat al-Laqad, al Kukaiti, and surrounding areas of Al-Mazrub. A member of the Dar Hamar emergency confirmed massive RSF withdrawals from Hamrat al Sheikh, Al-Mazroub, Sodari. The troops are repositioning in En Nahud, Ghebeish, and Wad Banda, in west Kordofan.

On 21 September, the SAF and allied forces kept advancing toward RSF's remaining strongholds in the region. Many are fleeing Hamrat al-Sheikh after RSF has started deploying vehicles and weapons among resident homes, with civilians fleeing to either Al Dabbah, open scrubland or any other safe area. The legal monitor has condemned the deployment in civilian zones.

On 25 September, SAF regained full control over Sodari. Sudanese medics accused the RSF of destroying and looting the town's hospital before the recapture, cutting off healthcare for over 50,000 families.

On 2 October, SAF recaptured Al Mazroub.

=== Fall of Kauda ===
On 22 June, the SPLM-N (al-Hilu), lost its most important stronghold in South Kordofan, the town Kauda, following the tensions between the Otoro tribe and SPLM-N.

== Civilian casualties ==
The RSF attacked the town of El Khoi, West Kordofan, injuring three civilians including a journalist, seizing four vehicles including an ambulance and two others belonging to the police, and looting the town's savings bank and police station on 14 August 2023. One civilian was killed after the RSF attacked the town of El-Odeya, West Kordofan and burned its police station on 20 September. Nine more were killed and 76 families were displaced after the RSF attacked the village of Abu Hamra in Um Rawaba on 8 November.

Fourteen people, including eleven children and two teachers, were killed in an SAF airstrike on a school in El Hadra, South Kordofan on 14 March 2024. Nine more civilians were reportedly killed by SAF intelligence services after being accused of collaborating with rebels in Kuek, South Kordofan on 11 April. The Sudanese government accused the RSF of looting aid from a WFP convoy travelling from Port Sudan to Zamzam IDP camp as it passed through Armel, on the border between West and North Kordofan, on 26 November, adding that the looted items were diverted to Nyala. On 14 December, Fifteen people were killed in an SAF drone strike on a civilian dairy transport vehicle along the Omdurman-Bara road between Khartoum and North Kordofan.

On 3 February, the SPLM–N shelled a market and residential areas in Kadugli, killing 44 people and injuring dozens of others.

At least 74 people were killed in an RSF attack on the village of Al-Zafa in West Kordofan on 24 April 2025. At least 13 people were killed in RSF attacks on West and South Kordofan on 31 May. Eight people were killed in an SAF drone attack on a school sheltering IDPs in Abu Zabad, West Kordofan on 10 June. More than 40 people were killed in shelling on the Al-Mujlad Hospital in Muglad, West Kordofan that was blamed on the SAF on 21 June. Eight people were killed by an SAF airstrike in Abu Zabad on 11 July, while 10 more were killed in SAF airstrikes in Abu Zabad and Al-Fulah on 13 July.

On 14 July more than 200 people were killed by the RSF in Bara, North Kordofan. At least 32 people were killed in an RSF attack on the village of Brima Rashid in West Kordofan on 23 July and an unspecified number of civilians were killed in a suspected RSF drone attack on vehicles traveling between Umm Dam Haj Ahmed in North Kordofan and Ed Dueim in White Nile State the next day. Eighteen people were killed on 7 August in RSF attacks on the villages of Markaz Al-Ziyadia and Lamina al-Ziyadiyah in North Kordofan. Seven people were killed on 19 August in an RSF attack on the village of al-Ghabshan al-Maramrah in North Kordofan. An unspecified number of people were killed by a joint RSF and SPLM–N drone strike in Dalami, South Kordofan, on 11 October.

On 29 November, the SPLM–N (al-Hilu) claimed that 45 people were killed in an SAF drone strike on the village of Kumo in the Nuba mountains of South Kordofan. On 4 December, at least 116 people, including 43 children, were killed in a drone strike blamed on the RSF in Kalogi, South Kordofan, while a WFP convoy was attacked in Hamrat El Sheikh, North Kordofan, damaging a truck and injuring its driver.

On 28 August 2026, Emergency Lawyers, an independent group documenting atrocities in Sudan, reports that eight civilians have been killed in drone strikes in the Sowdari District of North Kordofan.

=== Famine ===
On August 13, 2024, Civilian authorities affiliated with the SPLM–N declared a state of famine over parts of South Kordofan, including the Nuba Mountains, and Blue Nile States affecting around three million people. By 17 October, at least 646 people had died from malnutrition in the Nuba Mountains. The IPC also declared a state of famine in parts of the Nuba Mountains on 24 December. The Sudanese government rejected the findings.

Ayin Network reported in August 2026 that the population of North and West Kordofan was facing starvation. Many towns, including Al-Mazroub, Al-Nahoud, Fouja, and Ghabish had insufficient staples, mainly millet. The lack of supplies was largely caused by the restrictions on the transport of foodstuffs to the RSF-controlled territories that were imposed by the Sudanese government, as well as by RSF military occupying the key roads.
