= Timeline of the Sudanese civil war (2025) =

The following is a timeline of the Sudanese civil war (2023–present) in 2025.

This timeline is a dynamic and fluid list, and as such may never satisfy criteria of completeness. Moreover, some events may only be fully understood and/or discovered in retrospect.

== January ==
=== 1 January ===
The Joint Darfur Force (JDF) said it had killed 462 Rapid Support Forces (RSF) fighters including six commanders in a failed attack on Al-Malha, North Darfur. In addition, three vehicles were destroyed. The remaining unit under Ali Rizqallah Al-Safana retreated. The JDF also called on the RSF to surrender to the JDF or the Sudanese Armed Forces (SAF).

=== 2 January ===
The SAF claimed that RSF brigadier general Ibrahim Delib was killed along with 32 RSF fighters, including a Mauritanian national, after a drone being launched by the group misfired in El Fasher.

=== 4 January ===
Two people were killed by RSF shelling on the Saudi Hospital in El Fasher. Four others were killed by RSF shelling in Omdurman.

=== 5 January ===
Ten people were killed in an SAF airstrike in Khartoum.

The SAF and the JDF claimed to have deflected an RSF assault on El Fasher that came from the east and southeast of the city. The JDF also intercepted a weapons convoy for the RSF, arresting both Sudanese and Libyan nationals.

=== 7 January ===
The United States officially declared that the RSF had committed genocide and imposed sanctions on Hemedti.

The SAF retook the administrative center of Ombadda as well as Al-Shagla and the western section of the Al-Fitaihab neighborhood of Omdurman from the RSF. It also claimed to have freed three captive officers in Al-Fitaihab in a special operation that left more than 20 RSF militants dead, including a commander.

Four people were killed in an SAF airstrike on the Fata Borno IDP camp in Kutum, North Darfur.

=== 8 January ===
The SAF retook the town of Haj Abdallah in Gezira State, 58 kilometers from Wad Madani, and the village of Mahalla, 13 kilometers from Wad Madani, from the RSF.

=== 9 January ===
The SAF retook the town of Al-Shabarqa in Gezira State, 13 kilometers east of Wad Madani, from the RSF.

=== 10 January ===
The SAF retook the town of Um al-Qura in Gezira State, 40 kilometers east of Wad Madani, from the RSF, while the SAF-allied Sudan Shield Forces retook Wad al-Abyad, 20 kilometres from the Hantoub bridge.

At least 26 people were killed in an attack by the Sudan Shield Forces on the village of Tayba in Gezira State.

=== 11 January ===
The SAF retook Wad Madani, the capital of Gezira State.

Sixteen people were killed by RSF shelling on the Zamzam IDP camp in North Darfur.

=== 12 January ===
The SAF retook the Al-Rawad residential complex in Khartoum from the RSF.

=== 13 January ===
At least 120 people were killed by shelling in western Omdurman.

The Merowe Dam power station was damaged by RSF drones, causing a fire at the facility and power outages as far as Shendi, Port Sudan, Atbara and Omdurman.

The SAF retook Karkaraia and Hajar al-Jawad, on the road between Dalang and Kadugli in South Kordofan, from the SPLM-N (al-Hilu).

Thirteen people were killed by the SAF and allied militias in an attack on the informal settlement of Kambo Tayba in Gezira State.

=== 14 January ===
The JDF claimed to have killed hundreds of RSF militants, destroyed 262 vehicles, and captured 21 militants and 67 vehicles during clashes in Al-Malha and Halaf in North Darfur.

At least 18 people were killed in attacks by the Sudan Shield Forces on the Shukaba camp and Camp 16 in Gezira State.

=== 15 January ===
At least 120 people were killed in an RSF attack on a civilian convoy being escorted by the Sudan Liberation Movement (SLM) and the Gathering of Sudan Liberation Forces (GSLF) near Kabkabiya, North Darfur.

Nine people were killed in attacks by the SAF and the RSF on members of the Kanabi community, who mostly originate from Darfur, in Abu Gouta, Gezira State. Fifteen people were killed in an RSF attack on the village of Al-Khizan in Abu Gouta.

The Sultan Ali Dinar Palace Museum in El Fasher was shelled by the RSF, causing a fire that heavily damaged the structure and destroyed its contents and furniture.

=== 16 January ===
Senior US officials reported that the SAF had recently used chemical weapons against the RSF in rural areas at least twice. The US also sanctioned SAF chief General Abdel Fattah al-Burhan for the army's conduct in the war.

The RSF said that it attacked fighters and vehicles in Kabkabiya belonging to the JDF between the SLM-Al Nur and the GSLF. The RSF called for a joint committee to investigate the incident.

=== 18 January ===
Forty people were killed in an RSF attack on the village of Jebel Hilla in North Darfur.

Six drones struck the Al-Shawak power station in Gedaref State, injuring civil defence personnel and causing blackouts across the state and in Kassala State. Other drones hit the Gedaref state water station while another crashed near a bus station along the Gedaref-Kassala-Port Sudan highway.

The SAF reached the Al-Shukri junction in Shambat, Khartoum Bahri, while the RSF retreated by one kilometer southwards to the Hassan Ibrahim Malik University City. At least three people were killed by RSF shelling in Omdurman.

The RSF claimed to have taken Al-Hallaf, Drishaqi and Mao in North Darfur.

=== 20 January ===
At least 11 people were killed by RSF shelling on the Abu Shouk IDP camp in El Fasher.

A coalition of SAF and allied forces claimed to have repelled two RSF incursions from Libya in North Darfur near the tri-border area with Chad and Libya, killing a total of over 950 fighters, destroying 61 vehicles, and capturing 78 others that were equipped with advanced weaponry.

=== 21 January ===
The Sudanese Revolutionary Front expelled the United Popular Front from its member groups after the UPF accused the alliance of being unduly influenced by the RSF.

SAF units besieged at the Signal Corps garrison in Khartoum Bahri launched their first major offensive since September 2024, forcing the RSF to withdraw east towards the Kafouri neighborhood. The SAF also retook Abboud Park in Khartoum Bahri and the Juwayriyah School and the African Council Schools in Al Safiya district.

The RSF issued a 48-hour ultimatum for the SAF to withdraw from El Fasher.

=== 22 January ===
The SAF launched an offensive towards the El-Jeili oil refinery and retook the Rotana Mills southeast of the facility.

=== 23 January ===
The El-Jeili oil refinery caught fire with smoke being seen from Omdurman and Khartoum Bahri. The SAF claimed that the RSF had set fire to the facility, while the RSF claimed that it caught fire due to incendiary barrel bombs dropped by the Sudanese Air Force.

Two people were killed by RSF shelling on the Abu Shouk IDP camp.

An indefinite strike was launched by employees of the Bashair Hospital in Khartoum after an RSF member opened fire inside the facility the previous day.

=== 24 January ===
At least 70 people were killed in an RSF drone strike on the maternity ward of the Saudi Hospital in El Fasher that also destroyed its emergency department.

The SAF claimed to have broken the siege around the Signal Corp's base in Khartoum. The RSF denied the claims. The SAF also claimed to have broken the siege around its General Headquarters in Khartoum and retook the El-Jeili oil refinery.

The SAF and allied militias repelled an RSF attack on El Fasher following the expiration of the latter's ultimatum for the SAF to withdraw. The JDF claimed it had killed more than 400 RSF militants, destroyed more than 25 vehicles and captured 30 others.

Ayub Osman Nahar resigned as an advisor to Hemedti, saying that he refused to be part of the RSF's atrocities against civilians and accusing the group of burning villages and killing civilians in North Darfur and Gezira State.

=== 27 January ===
The SAF claimed to have pushed into parts of eastern Khartoum near the Al-Rabat College in Burri district, advanced through large portions of the Al-Azba, Kafouri, Ad Babaker, and Ramallah neighborhoods of Khartoum North, and continued their advances towards the El Mek Nimr Bridge. They also claimed to have deployed troops to hold several neighborhoods under their control.

More than 100 people were killed in an RSF attack on the village of Broush in North Darfur.

=== 28 January ===
The SAF claimed to have seized the RSF's Medical Directorate located in the former SAF Paratroopers base in Shambat, as well as the Blue and Bashir Towers in Khartoum Bahri.

The RSF announced the death in action of one of its senior commanders, Rahmtalla al-Mahdi, also known as "Jalha", along with his brother. The two were reportedly killed in an airstrike east of Khartoum.

=== 29 January ===
The SAF made further gains in Khartoum Bahri and advanced towards the El Mek Nimr Bridge, forcing the RSF out of almost the entire city except in Hillet Hamad.

Renewed fighting in El Fasher killed seven people and injured 12 others. The SAF claimed that the deaths were caused by RSF shelling on the Abu Shouk camp. The SAF also claimed to have repelled an RSF attack on the city.

=== 30 January ===
The SAF retook the city of Umm Ruwaba in North Kordofan, advancing towards El Obeid. It shot down ten drones over El Obeid and retook Al-Azba and the eastern part of the Kafouri neighbourhood of Khartoum Bahri.

== February ==
=== 1 February ===
At least 60 people were killed while 250 others were injured in an RSF attack on the Sabreen Market in Omdurman. Two others were killed in an SAF airstrike in Khartoum, while at least seven were killed by RSF shelling in El Obeid. Eleven people were killed by RSF shelling on the Abu Shouk camp, while 13 others were killed during clashes in Nyala.

The SAF claimed to have retaken the cities of Tambul, Rufaa and Al-Hasahisa in Gezira State.

=== 2 February ===
The JDF claimed to have repelled an RSF attack on El Fasher, killing 140 fighters and mercenaries, destroying 43 vehicles and capturing 12 more. The JDF also said that RSF fighters were appearing more on foot and on camels and horses, and also appeared to be under the influence of drugs.

The SAF retook Wad Rawah and al-Nabati in Gezira State.

Renewed fighting and airstrikes in Darfur left at least 248 people dead or wounded.

=== 3 February ===
Abdallah Hussein, a senior RSF commander was killed by an SAF airstrike in al-Kamelin in Gezira State.

The SAF claimed to have broke the siege of its Corps of Engineers garrison in the Al 'Aylafun area, and retook the al-Asaylat, Um Daw Ban, and Al 'Aylafun areas of the East Nile locality. The SAF said it plans to continue advances to recapture the Soba Bridge.

According to the state health minister of South Kordofan, the SPLM-N (al-Hilu) killed 44 people after shelling the main market, residential neighborhoods, and temporary shelters in schools in Kadugli.

Twenty-five people were killed in an SAF airstrike in Nyala.

=== 4 February ===
At least six people were killed by RSF shelling on the al-Nao hospital in Omdurman.

The SAF claimed to have retaken al-Kamelin and laid siege to the town of Naima in White Nile State.

Engineers from the Khartoum State Water Authority were fired at by RSF snipers stationed at the Kuwaiti building while they were assessing the damage to the Bahri Water Plant.

=== 5 February ===
The SAF claimed to have retaken the al-Rumaila district of Khartoum as well as the central mint.

Five people were killed in SAF airstrikes in Nyala.

=== 6 February ===
The SAF claimed to have retaken the El Tekeina, El Maseed and El Noba areas south of Giad, the Saria Industrial Complex near Abu Hamama in Khartoum, and Wadi El Akhdar in the Sharg El Nil area of Khartoum Bahri.

=== 7 February ===
The SAF claimed to have retaken the Traffic Signs and License Plates Factory along with the entire industrial area of Khartoum. They also claimed to have retaken Al-Masoudiya in Khartoum state and Abu Quta in northwestern Gezira State.

The SAF claimed to have shot down seven RSF drones over Debba, Northern State.

Three people were killed in an RSF attack on the Zamzam IDP camp. Five others were killed in an RSF attack on Saloma, southeast of El Fasher.

=== 8 February ===
The SAF claimed to have retaken the Kafouri district of Khartoum Bahri.

The SLM and the GSLF launched an incursion into Chad from Darfur, resulting in clashes with the Chadian Army in the vicinity of the tri-border area with Sudan and Libya. Six Sudanese soldiers were killed while 13 others were injured. Three vehicles were also destroyed while two Sudanese commanders were captured and detained at Amdjarass.

=== 10 February ===
The Transitional Sovereignty Council announced that a civilian-led transitional government would be formed once the SAF takes full control of Khartoum.

=== 12 February ===
At least 31 people were killed following two days of RSF attacks on the Zamzam IDP camp.

=== 13 February ===
At least 30 people were reported killed in RSF attacks on al-Jamalab and Na'ima in White Nile State. Fifteen others drowned on the White Nile river while they were boarding a boat to escape the attacks.

=== 15 February ===
A 100-member RSF unit stationed in Al-Muzmum, Sennar State, surrendered to the SAF in Singa after previously fleeing to South Sudan.

The SAF claimed to have retaken the El Nour Islamic Complex and the Bahri Thermal Power Plant in Khartoum.

=== 16 February ===
Ten people were killed in RSF attacks in Mellit Station in El Fasher. The SAF claimed to have destroyed an RSF base in the east of the city.

=== 17 February ===
The SAF took control of the Kafouri area, the last RSF stronghold in Khartoum North, and the city of Er Rahad in North Kordofan. It also retook the Ministry of Animal Resources, the Tax Tower, the Malaysian Tower, and the Medical Supply Department headquarters near central Khartoum.

The Sudanese government extended the opening of the Adre border crossing with Chad until 16 May to allow humanitarian aid to reach Darfur.

=== 18 February ===
The SAF retook the Kober Bridge connecting Khartoum with Khartoum Bahri, as well as large parts of El Sajana and El Hilla El Jadeeda in southeastern Khartoum.

The RSF announced plans to form a parallel government in exile, the Government of Peace and Unity, in Nairobi, Kenya.

More than 200 people were killed following three days of RSF attacks in the El Geteina area of White Nile State.

An RSF assault on the Zamzam camp forced thousands to flee to Tawila.

=== 19 February ===
Six people were killed by RSF shelling in Omdurman.

The SAF claimed to have retaken the El Hurriya Bridge in central Khartoum, as well as Sidra in North Kordofan.

The United Nations confirmed a state of famine in the Zamzam, Abu Shouk and Al Salam IDP camps in North Darfur, as well as in two locations in the Western Nuba Mountains.

=== 20 February ===
Ten people were killed in an airstrike in El Khazan Jadeed, East Darfur.

The Sudanese government recalled its ambassador to Kenya over the latter's hosting of meetings by the RSF and allied groups. It also imposed a ban on the Saudi-owned Asharq News news channel, which was lifted on 24 March.

=== 22 February ===
The SAF and the Sudan Shield Forces claimed to have forced the RSF to retreat from the Soba neighbourhood of eastern Khartoum and retook the Al-Lulua and Al-Samra neighbourhoods southeast of the Soba Bridge connecting Khartoum's southern and eastern neighbourhoods with the rural areas of East Nile, adding that the 17 RSF militants were killed while nine vehicles were destroyed or captured.

=== 23 February ===
The RSF, the SPLM-N (al-Hilu) and allied groups signed a charter to establish the Government of Peace and Unity following a meeting in Nairobi.

The SAF's Sayyad Force lifted the two-year siege of El Obeid. The SAF also recaptured El Geteina.

=== 24 February ===
The SAF claimed to have taken the eastern part of the Soba Bridge.

The SAF said that it had partially broken the siege of Dalang and captured the Al-Karkal, Koli, and Kiqa regions north of Kadugli and Hajar Al-Jawad and Karkariya to the south.

The RSF claimed to have shot down an Ilyushin fighter jet over Nyala, killing its crew. The pilot was later identified as Major General Abulgasem Ali.

The National Umma Party removed Fadlallah Burma Nasir as its acting leader following his cosigning of the Government of Peace and Unity agreement with the RSF. In response, Nasir ordered the dissolution of the party's Presidential Institution.

=== 25 February ===
An SAF Antonov An-26 transport aircraft crashed into a residential area of Karari, Omdurman, during takeoff from Wadi Seidna Air Base, killing at least 46 people including Major-General Bahr Ahmed, a senior commander in Khartoum.

The SAF recaptured Al-Khiwai, advancing closer to relieve the siege of El-Khiwai.

=== 26 February ===
Food aid was halted due to continued attacks on the Zamzam camp.

Russia called on the UN to support the Sudanese government's peace efforts and warned against the parallel RSF government that could halt efforts to support stability in Sudan.

=== 28 February ===
The RSF launched a drone strike on the Merowe Power Station, leading to a power outage in the city.

The JDF claimed to have intercepted an RSF supply shipment in North Darfur and "neutralized" foreign mercenaries, demanding apologies from Colombia. The claims were denied by the RSF.

== March ==
=== 1 March ===
The SAF claimed to have dismantled a cell based in the Marabi’ al-Sharif area of Soba Sharq, east of Khartoum, that counterfeited currency for the RSF and included foreign nationals.

=== 2 March ===
The SAF retook Station 13 and parts of the El Nasr and El Huda neighbourhoods in Khartoum.

=== 3 March ===
The SAF reached the eastern edge of the al-Manshia bridge in East Nile, Khartoum and retook the headquarters of the East Nile Central Reserve Forces.

Seven people were killed in an SAF airstrike on Umm Kuraydim, north of El Obeid.

=== 4 March ===
More than 80 people were killed or injured by RSF shelling on Abu Shouk IDP camp.

=== 5 March ===
The SAF retook El Dali and El Mazmum, the RSF's last strongholds in Sennar State, as well as Al-Jabalain in White Nile state.

=== 6 March ===
Sudan filed a case in the International Court of Justice (ICJ) against the United Arab Emirates, accusing it of complicity in genocide by providing weapons to the RSF.

Canada imposed sanctions on al-Burhan and Hemedti, citing in part "an unwillingness on the part of the leaders to negotiate an end to the war".

=== 7 March ===
A detention centre operated by the RSF near Khartoum was discovered, revealing evidence of torture and a nearby mass grave containing over 500 unmarked graves.

=== 9 March ===
Seven people were killed in an RSF attack on Al Khiwai, West Kordofan, while two others were killed in RSF drone strikes in Al-Malha, North Darfur.

=== 10 March ===
The SAF claimed to have destroyed 47 vehicles and 100 drones belonging to the RSF in El Fasher over the course of 10 days. They also claimed that local forces killed 15 fighters and that they recaptured the whole Al-Salam neighborhood and the Lafat Taqro buildings in the south of the city.

=== 12 March ===
10 people were killed by RSF shelling in El Fasher, while two children were killed and eight more were injured by RSF shelling in El Obeid.

=== 13 March ===
RSF shelling on El Obeid killed one woman and injured four others, bringing the death toll from RSF attacks on the city to 32.

=== 14 March ===
The Sudanese government ordered a ban on imports from Kenya, citing national security concerns amid criticism over the latter's hosting of the RSF.

The SAF claimed to have shot down a drone squadron targeting Atbara. Eight civilians were killed in RSF raids on eastern Khartoum.

=== 15 March ===
Hemedti vowed to carry out new offensives on March 17, the anniversary of the RSF's founding, claiming the RSF had undergone several changes and had made alliances with other groups such as the SPLM-N. He threatened to invade Port Sudan and attack Atbara, Shendi, Merowe, Al Dabbah, and Dongola. He also said that countries supporting the SAF would "pay the price".

The bodies of 11 people suspected to have been killed by the RSF were recovered from a well in the Fayhaa neighborhood of Khartoum.

=== 16 March ===
Government buildings used by the RSF in Ed Daein and Nyala were destroyed by missiles. The SAF also claimed to have taken control of the Family Club, Khartoum 3, and part of Khartoum 2 and cut off the last RSF supply route to the Presidential Palace.

Four people were killed and 30 people were injured including 18 children from RSF shelling in Karari, Omdurman.

The SAF said that its Armoured Corps had linked up with SAF forces at the General Command headquarters in Khartoum after clearing the People's Teaching Hospital from the RSF.

=== 17 March ===
The United Nations said the RSF detained more than 60 peacekeepers, abducted eight civilian staff, and seized eight vehicles and 280,000 litres of fuel from a United Nations Interim Security Force for Abyei (UNISFA) logistics convoy heading from a refueling mission in Kadugli.

=== 19 March ===
The Sudanese government suspended development projects funded by Arab and international lenders, including the World Bank and African Development Bank, citing in part concerns over addressing arrears and resuming funding flows due to the ongoing conflict.

The SAF claimed to have killed an RSF commander and 15 other fighters in an airstrike in El Fasher.

=== 20 March ===
The RSF claimed to have taken Al-Malha, which the JDF denied, adding that eight senior RSF officers, including field commander Colonel Ayoub Ahimer, had been killed.

=== 21 March ===
The SAF retook the Republican Palace in Khartoum from the RSF. An RSF drone strike on the palace that same day killed six journalists including two military reporters and four members of a Sudan TV crew.

=== 22 March ===
The SAF retook the Corinthia Hotel and the headquarters of the Central Bank of Sudan and the General Intelligence Service in Khartoum from the RSF. It also retook Tuti Island, situated at the confluence of the Blue Nile and the White Nile, after advancing through the Tuti Bridge.

Forty-eight people were killed in ethnically motivated attacks by the RSF in Al-Malha.

=== 23 March ===
Eleven people were killed in an RSF drone strike on the Radwan Mosque in Hilat Kuko in East Nile area of Khartoum. Eight people were killed by RSF shelling in El Fasher, while three others were killed by RSF shelling in Omdurman.

Eighteen people were killed following three days of RSF attacks on villages in Gezira State northwest of Wad Madani.

The RSF claimed to have taken Lagawa in West Kordofan.

=== 24 March ===
The RSF launched a series of attacks in eastern Khartoum, killing at least five people and injuring dozens. At the same time, the group retreated from the Salama, Azhari, Ad Hussein, Mayo, Gereif West, Burri, Sahafat and Kalakla neighbourhoods of Khartoum and were seen moving south towards Jebel Aulia.

The Darfur Initiative for Justice and Peace said that hundreds of civilians were killed in an SAF airstrike on the Tur'rah market near El Fasher.

=== 26 March ===
The SAF retook Khartoum International Airport and the Manshiya Bridge over the Blue Nile in Khartoum. It also retook the Tiba al-Hassanab camp in Jabal Aulia, which is described as the RSF's last stronghold in Khartoum and its main base in central Sudan.

Al-Burhan visited the presidential palace in Khartoum and announced the liberation of the city, proclaiming that "Khartoum is free".

=== 27 March ===
The SAF reportedly cleared the last pockets of RSF control south of Khartoum and captured Jabal Awliya. They also claimed to have neutralized 23 RSF personnel and captured an artillery piece.

A swarm of drones attacked the city of Ad-Damazin in Blue Nile State, with some explosions and smoke being reported. The SAF claimed to have shot down five drones over the armored corps base, 4th infantry division headquarters, and the city's airport.

=== 29 March ===
The SAF retook the Souq Libya market west of Omdurman.

=== 30 March ===
The SAF and allied fighters repelled an RSF assault on El Fasher and attacked a supply convoy, destroying 16 vehicles and killing dozens of RSF fighters. Nine civilians were killed and 17 more were injured in RSF shelling.

=== 31 March ===
Seven people were killed by RSF shelling on the Abu Shouk camp.

The RSF claimed to have taken Khor El Dalaib in South Kordofan following clashes that left 12 civilians dead. It also claimed to have killed 70 fighters of the Islamic Movement, and destroyed or captured 13 vehicles.

== April ==
=== 2 April ===
Two people were killed by RSF shelling on the Abu Shouk camp.

At least 96 people were killed following four days of attacks on the RSF on Al-Jumu’iya, south of Omdurman.

=== 3 April ===
The RSF claimed to have shot down an SAF Antonov aircraft over El Fasher, killing its eight crew.

=== 4 April ===
More than 100 civilians were killed in clashes in Al Malha. The RSF was also accused of human rights violations after its capture, including looting, killings, and torture.

=== 5 April ===
The Merowe power station was struck by an RSF drone, causing power outages in Omdurman and Northern State.

=== 6 April ===
At least 15 civilians were killed in clashes between the SAF and the RSF in Ombadda.

Four people were killed in an RSF drone attack on Al Dabbah, Northern State.

=== 7 April ===
The RSF launched a drone attack on Dongola Airport, destroying a fuel storage facility.

Three people were killed by RSF shelling on Abu Shouk IDP camp. Several others were killed in an joint RSF and SPLM-N (al-Hilu) attack in Rashad, South Kordofan.

=== 8 April ===
The SAF retook the Al-Nusour and Al-Konan camps as well as the Fatasha, Al-Hilla Al-Jadida, and Iskan Al-Safwa areas of Omdurman from the RSF.

=== 9 April ===
RSF drone and artillery attacks in El Obeid and Al Dabbah killed 13 people.

=== 10 April ===
The ICJ began hearing Sudan's genocide case against the UAE.

At least 15 civilians were killed by RSF shelling on the Abu Shouk camp. The RSF also claimed to have taken Umm Keddada.

=== 11 April ===
At least 32 civilians were killed in RSF shelling and drone attacks on El Fasher.

=== 12 April ===
An RSF attack on Zamzam Refugee Camp killed or injured hundreds, most of them women and children. The RSF denied the allegations.

=== 13 April ===
The RSF claimed to have taken Zamzam Refugee Camp.

=== 14 April ===
The RSF launched a drone attack on Atbara, hitting a fuel depot and a power generation station and causing blackouts.

=== 15 April ===
Hemedti officially announced the establishment of the Government of Peace and Unity.

An evening curfew was declared in El Fasher in response to RSF attacks.

=== 16 April ===
At least 57 people were killed by RSF shelling in El Fasher.

=== 19 April ===
The RSF was accused of killing multiple civilians in an attack on the village of Broush in North Darfur.

=== 20 April ===
At least 30 people were killed during RSF attacks in El Fasher.

=== 22 April ===
At least 55 people were killed following two days of RSF shelling in El Fasher.

=== 23 April ===
A faction of the Justice and Equality Movement (JEM) led by Mohamed Bashara Yahya announced its allegiance to the SAF.

=== 24 April ===
At least 74 people were killed in an RSF attack on the village of Al-Zafa in West Kordofan.

=== 25 April ===
At least 11 people were killed in an RSF drone strike in Atbara that hit a displaced persons camp and energy facilities.

RSF shelling from Salha in Omdurman hit the SAF's general headquarters in Khartoum.

=== 27 April ===
The RSF was accused of killing 31 people execution-style in Salha, Omdurman.

An RSF-allied militia abducted 40 aid workers and about 50 civilians who were evacuating the Zamzam camp.

=== 29 April ===
Forty-five people were killed following two days of RSF shelling in El Fasher.

=== 30 April ===
The first shipment of humanitarian aid from the UN arrived in central Khartoum for the first time since the war began.

The UAE said it had intercepted millions of rounds of ammunition at an airport intended for the SAF.

== May ==
=== 1 May ===
The RSF took En Nahud in West Kordofan, killing 19 people.

=== 2 May ===
The SAF retook the villages of Al-Sufi, Al-Alqa and Al-Shaqeeq on the west bank of the White Nile in White Nile State, while the RSF launched a drone attack on the headquarters of the SAF's 18th Infantry Division in Kosti.

=== 3 May ===
The SAF said that the RSF fired several suicide drones towards Kassala Airport and Port Sudan, targeting Port Sudan Air Base and a goods warehouse and civilian facilities in the city, causing "limited damage".

The SAF launched airstrikes on Nyala Airport following the landing of an aircraft believed to be transporting weapons to the RSF.

The leader of the Otash IDP camp in Nyala, Abdel Razek Hassan Jalis, was shot dead along with his son and another camp resident in an attack by the RSF.

=== 5 May ===
The ICJ dismissed Sudan's genocide case against the UAE, citing lack of authority to continue the proceedings.

=== 6 May ===
The RSF launched another series of drone strikes on Port Sudan.

Six people were killed by RSF shelling on the Abu Shouk camp.

The Sudanese government severed diplomatic relations with the UAE due to its alleged support for the RSF.

=== 7 May ===
The RSF launched drone strikes on Port Sudan for the fourth consecutive day.

=== 8 May ===
Eight people were killed in RSF attacks on Omdurman.

=== 9 May ===
Fourteen people were killed in RSF shelling on Abu Shouk camp.

The Sudanese government ordered the shutdown of the Greater Nile Oil Pipeline carrying petroleum experts by South Sudan, citing RSF attacks.

=== 10 May ===
At least 20 inmates were killed in a suspected RSF drone strike on El Obeid prison.

=== 11 May ===
The SAF claimed to have retaken the town of Al-Khuwayyi in West Kordofan from the RSF.

Seven people were killed by RSF shelling in El Fasher.

=== 13 May ===
The SAF claimed to have retaken the town of Al-Hamadi in South Kordofan, as well as the Al-Jami’a and Al-Shaqla neighbourhoods in southern Omdurman from the RSF.

=== 14 May ===
The RSF launched drone attacks on three electricity stations in Omdurman, causing blackouts across Khartoum.

=== 15 May ===
Four people were killed in a suspected RSF drone strike on an SAF hospital in El Obeid.

=== 16 May ===
Ten people were killed by SPLM-N (al-Hilu) shelling in Kadugli, while the SAF took Al-Tareeda and Al-Dakka in Qadeer, South Kordofan, from the SPLM-N (al-Hilu).

=== 18 May ===
Fourteen people were killed by RSF shelling on a market in the Abu Shouk camp. One person was killed in an RSF attack on the village of Al-Samra in White Nile State.

Nine people, including seven military personnel, were killed in an RSF drone strike on a base belonging to the Sudan Shield Forces in the Al-Butana plain of Gezira State.

=== 19 May ===
The SAF retook Wadi al-Atrun in Al-Malha, located on a strategic road linking Northern State and North Darfur. The SAF also retook Al-Salha in Omdurman, Al Alqa in the White Nile, and the Um Libana area in West Kordofan.

General al-Burhan appointed Kamil Idris as prime minister.

=== 20 May ===
The SAF said it had cleared Khartoum State of the RSF.

=== 21 May ===
The SAF said it had cleared White Nile State of the RSF.

=== 22 May ===
The US announced new sanctions on Sudan over the SAF's alleged use of chemical weapons against the RSF.

The SAF said it had found mass graves in Al-Salha, Omdurman containing the remains of 465 people killed by the RSF.

=== 23 May ===
The SAF and its allies announced the capture of Ed Dubeibat in South Kordofan.

=== 27 May ===
An RSF drone strike hit an SAF base and caused a fire at an SAF fuel depot in Kosti.

Three people were killed in an RSF drone strike on a public transport station in Er Rahad.

=== 28 May ===
Eight people were killed in an RSF drone strike in Al Khuwayyi, while two others were killed in a separate attack in Dibebad.

=== 29 May ===
The RSF claimed to have retaken Dibebad and Al Khuwayyi.

=== 30 May ===
At least 28 people were killed in RSF attacks on El-Obeid, Dibebad and Al Khuwayyi. Among the dead were six people killed in a drone attack on a hospital in El-Obeid.

A World Food Programme (WFP) warehouse in El Fasher was damaged by shelling blamed on the RSF.

=== 31 May ===
At least 89 people were killed in an SAF airstrike on a market in Al-Koma, North Darfur.

At least 13 people were killed in RSF attacks on West and South Kordofan.

The SAF launched drone strikes on Nyala.

== June ==
=== 1 June ===
Prime Minister Idris ordered the dissolution of the transitional government.

=== 2 June ===
The Sudanese government and the RSF traded blame for an attack on a joint WFP-UNICEF convoy in Al-Koma that killed five people and destroyed several trucks carrying humanitarian aid.

=== 4 June ===
Fourteen people were killed by RSF shelling on Abu Shouk IDP camp.

=== 5 June ===
Five people were killed in an RSF drone strike in El Obeid.

Six people were killed by RSF shelling on Abu Shouk IDP camp.

=== 6 June ===
A Libyan National Army (LNA) unit crossed the common border into Sudan and reached three kilometers within Sudanese territory near Jabal Arkanu before clashing with an SAF-allied group, leaving two Libyans dead and others captured.

=== 7 June ===
The RSF and the SPLM-N (al-Hilu) took the town of Um Dehilib, South Kordofan.

=== 9 June ===
The RSF claimed to have taken the headquarters of the SAF's 22nd Infantry Division in Babanusa.

The RSF launched a widespread campaign of arrests across South Darfur and East Darfur.

=== 10 June ===
The SAF accused the LNA of carrying out a joint attack with the RSF in the Libya-Egypt-Sudan border triangle.

Eight people were killed in an SAF drone attack on a school sheltering IDPs in Abu Zabad, West Kordofan.

=== 11 June ===
The SAF announced its withdrawal from the Libya-Egypt-Sudan border triangle following attacks by the LNA and the RSF the previous day.

Eight people were killed by RSF shelling in Abu Shouk IDP camp.

=== 12 June ===
The SLM-Minnawi accused the RSF of kidnapping 100 civilians fleeing El Fasher for forced conscription.

=== 13 June ===
The SAF carried out a series of drone strikes on Nyala.

Seven people, including five children, were killed by RSF shelling in El Obeid.

=== 15 June ===
At least 35 people were killed by RSF shelling on an IDP shelter at the agriculture ministry building in El Fasher.

The SAF claimed to have repelled an RSF assault on El Fasher, destroying two armored troop carriers, two armored combat vehicles, and killing and injuring dozens of soldiers.

=== 16 June ===
The RSF took the oasis of Karb El Toum near the Libyan border.

Fighting broke out between the SAF and the RSF in Babanusa for the first time since January 2024.

=== 17 June ===
The SAF repelled an attack from the SPLM-N (Al-Hilu) in Kadugli.

=== 18 June ===
Médecins Sans Frontières claimed cholera reached Darfur for the first time since the beginning of the war.

=== 19 June ===
The SAF claimed to have destroyed 14 RSF vehicles in airstrikes near Babanusa.

=== 20 June ===
SPLM-N (Al-Hilu) shelling destroyed five houses in Kadugli without causing casualties.

=== 21 June ===
More than 40 people were killed in shelling on the Al-Mujlad Hospital in Muglad, West Kordofan that was blamed on the SAF.

=== 25 June ===
An RSF drone strike hit civilian and military positions in Dalang, killing four civilians and an unknown number of soldiers.

The SAF claimed to have retaken the town of Baldago in Blue Nile State from the RSF and the SPLM-N (al-Hilu).

=== 26 June ===
An RSF unit attacked the Kober and Dagrees prisons in Nyala in an attempt to free one of its commanders, triggering clashes that left at least 23 people dead and dozens of inmates escaping.

=== 27 June ===
Thirteen people were killed by RSF shelling in El Fasher.

=== 28 June ===
The SAF claimed to have retaken key roads linking Kadugli and Dalang from the SPLM-N (Al-Hilu).

The SAF launched drone strikes on RSF positions in Nyala.

=== 29 June ===
Three people were killed by RSF shelling on Abu Shouk IDP camp.

== July ==
=== 1 July ===
The SAF intercepted RSF drones in Merowe and Al-Dabbah.

The RSF and the SPLM-N (al-Hilu) announced the creation in Nyala of a governing alliance headed by Hemedti, with SPLM-N leader Abdelaziz al-Hilu as his deputy.

=== 4 July ===
Ethiopian militias attacked farmers at Al-Fashaga District.

Four people were killed in clashes between the Kababish tribe and the Hawawir people in Al-Dabbah.

=== 6 July ===
Five people were killed by RSF shelling on Abu Shouk IDP camp.

=== 7 July ===
The SAF captured Al-Riash and Kazgali in North Kordofan from the RSF.

=== 8 July ===
Eight people were killed in an RSF drone strike in El Fasher.

The SLM arrested two journalists in El Fasher.

=== 10 July ===
Four people were killed by RSF shelling in El Obeid.

=== 11 July ===
Eight people were killed by an SAF airstrike in Abu Zabad, West Kordofan.

The RSF launched a major attack on El Fasher, seizing the city's main livestock market, the Shalla prison and the headquarters of the Central Reserve Forces before being driven back the next day by the SAF.

=== 12 July ===
Five people were killed by RSF shelling in El Fasher.

=== 13 July ===
Ten people were killed in SAF airstrikes in Abu Zabad and Al-Fulah in West Kordofan.

The RSF claimed to have taken the town of Um Sumaima in North Darfur. However, Darfur's governor, Minni Minnawi, claimed that it had been retaken by the JDF.

The bodies of 26 people killed by the RSF were recovered from a mass grave at the Al-Nashisheiba campus of the University of Gezira.

=== 14 July ===
More than 200 people were killed by the RSF in Bara, North Kordofan.

=== 15 July ===
Six people were killed by shelling on the Nyvasha market in Abu Shouk camp.

=== 16 July ===
Five people including children were killed by RSF shelling in El Fasher.

=== 18 July ===
General al-Burhan ordered the SAF's withdrawal from Khartoum as part of efforts to end looting.

The European Union imposed sanctions on SAF commander Abuqala Mohamed Kaikal, RSF commander Hussein Barsham and the firms Al-Khaleej Bank and Red Rock Mining.

=== 19 July ===
The SAF airdropped supplies in Babanusa.

=== 21 July ===
The SAF and the JDF repelled a major attack by the RSF in El Fasher.

Five people were killed in suspected SAF drone strikes on fuel markets in Al-Fulah and Abu Zabad.

=== 22 July ===
Clashes broke out in Kadugli between the SAF and a formerly-allied militia led by Kafi Tayar over the latter's attempts to seize food from a market.

=== 23 July ===
General Al-Taj Youssef Aboukadair, a senior RSF commander also known as Folgank, was killed by an SAF drone strike in Abu Zabad that also killed two other RSF commanders.

At least 32 people were killed in an RSF attack on the village of Brima Rashid in West Kordofan.

=== 24 July ===
An unspecified number of civilians were killed in a suspected RSF drone attack on vehicles traveling between Umm Dam Haj Ahmed in North Kordofan and Ed Dueim in White Nile State.

=== 25 July ===
A suspected RSF drone strike hit an SAF position known as Al-Hafra west of Ed Dueim.

=== 26 July ===
The Leadership Council of the Sudan Founding Alliance (TASIS), a coalition led by the RSF, announced a parallel government with Hemedti as chair of a 15-person presidential council and Mohammed Hassan Osman al-Ta'ishi as prime minister.

=== 30 July ===
The RSF claimed to have taken the town of Umm Sumeima, west of El Obeid, while the SAF claimed to have taken Al-Hamra in White Nile state.

== August ==
=== 2 August ===
The SAF and the JDF claimed to have killed an RSF commander who held Colombian citizenship in El Fasher during a failed RSF attack on the city.

Fifteen people trying to flee El Fasher to Garni were killed by the RSF.

=== 4 August ===
A counter-terrorism court in Port Sudan charged Hemedti for the killing of West Darfur governor Khamis Abakar in 2023.

=== 6 August ===
The SAF claimed to have shot down an Emirati aircraft carrying Colombian mercenaries as it landed at Nyala Airport, killing 40 people. The United Arab Emirates Ministry of Foreign Affairs denied the accusation, calling it unfounded and lacking evidence.

=== 7 August ===
Sudanese prosecutors charged Hemedti and 16 other TASIS leaders with committing war crimes in El Fasher and South Kordofan.

Three SLM officials (Legal Advisor Mahmoud Koreina, Economic Affairs Advisor Adam al-Nur, and Media Advisor Mustafa al-Jamil) announced the formation of a splinter faction in Uganda following their dismissal by Minni Minawi.

Eighteen people were killed in RSF attacks on the villages of Markaz Al-Ziyadia and Lamina al-Ziyadiyah in North Kordofan.

=== 11 August ===
At least 40 people were killed in an RSF attack on Abu Shouk camp.

The SAF claimed to have killed more than 200 RSF fighters and destroyed or captured 46 combat vehicles following an RSF attack on El Fasher. Nine people were abducted by the RSF during the event.

=== 13 August ===
Three people were killed in an RSF drone strike on an event organized by the Sudan Shield Forces in Tambul, Gezira State.

The RSF accused the SAF of carrying out an airstrike that destroyed the Ministry of Urban Planning building in Ed Daein and injured several people.

=== 15 August ===
Three people were killed in RSF shelling on the Abu Shouk camp.

=== 16 August ===
At least 31 people were killed in RSF shelling on the Abu Shouk camp.

The SAF destroyed 4,500 landmines, shells and other munitions recovered near Khartoum in a controlled detonation at the Wadi Seidna garrison as part of cleanup efforts.

One person was killed in a grenade attack inside the main hospital of Zalingei.

=== 17 August ===
The RSF was accused of summarily executing 12 people in Shaqra, west of El Fasher.

Two people were killed in a drone strike on a market in Mellit, North Darfur.

=== 19 August ===
Seven people were killed in an RSF attack on the village of al-Ghabshan al-Maramrah in North Kordofan.

The SAF and the RSF traded blame for a drone strike that damaged three trucks belonging to a WFP humanitarian aid convoy in Mellit.

=== 20 August ===
Muhannad Ibrahim Fadl, commander of the SAF-allied Al-Bara' ibn Malik Battalion, was killed in an RSF ambush on an SAF reconnaissance unit west of El Obeid.

=== 21 August ===
At least 14 people were killed by RSF shelling in Abu Shouk camp.

=== 22 August ===
The SAF claimed to have destroyed 130 RSF combat vehicles and captured 92 others following clashes in Abu Qawad, near El Obeid.

=== 23 August ===
Six women and their children were abducted by the RSF from Abu Shouk camp.

=== 24 August ===
At least 13 people, most of them children and women were killed by the RSF on the road between El Fasher and Tawila.

=== 25 August ===
The RSF claimed to have shot down a Baykar Bayraktar Akıncı drone operated by the SAF over Nyala.

One person was killed in an attack on the El Fasher South Hospital.

A UN humanitarian aid convoy operated by UNICEF arrived in Dalang for the first time since October 2024.

=== 26 August ===
The Cabinet of Sudan held its first meeting in Khartoum since the war began.

The RSF carried out a drone strike on Heglig Airport, killing five people.

=== 28 August ===
The RSF shelled a densely populated area of El Fasher, killing at least 24 people and injuring 55.

=== 30 August ===
At least 35 people were killed in an SAF drone strike on the Yashfin Specialised Hospital in Nyala, which coincided with Hemedti's inaugural as head of the RSF-led parallel government in the city.

The SAF carried out drone strikes on RSF positions in El Fasher for the first time since April. Seven people were killed in RSF shelling on the city.

The RSF carried out attacks on Heglig, causing an unspecified number of casualties.

== September ==
=== 1 September ===
The RSF claimed to have taken the Dimsilk and Ziyadia neighbourhoods of El Fasher along with the Mellit bus station in the same city. At the same time, four people were killed by RSF shelling on the Abu Shouk camp, while at least 18 people were killed by RSF shelling on El Fasher.

=== 2 September ===
Thirteen people were killed in an SAF drone strike on a market in Mellit.

The SAF-aligned government said that it would continue to open the Adre border crossing with Chad until the end of the year.

=== 4 September ===
One person was killed in an SAF drone strike on a market in Manawashi, South Darfur. The drone responsible was shot down by the RSF over Mershing, with RSF commanders claiming that it was a Baykar Bayraktar Akıncı drone.

=== 5 September ===
Sudan filed a complaint before the UN Security Council accusing the UAE of recruiting, financing, and deploying hundreds of Colombian mercenaries to fight alongside the RSF.

=== 7 September ===
The SAF claimed to have retaken Kazgeil and Fartangoul in North Kordofan from the RSF.

=== 8 September ===
Al-Sadiq Makin, a senior RSF commander in Kordofan, was killed during clashes with the SAF in Kazgeil.

=== 9 September ===
The RSF carried out drone strikes on the Khartoum area, causing a major power outage in Omdurman and killing Major General Abu Obeida Fadlallah, a former SAF attaché.

=== 11 September ===
The SAF retook Bara in North Kordofan from the RSF.

=== 12 September ===
Ten people were killed in an RSF raid on the Al-Nasr neighborhood of El Fasher.

The United States imposed sanctions on finance minister and Justice and Equality Movement leader Gibril Ibrahim and the Al-Bara' ibn Malik Battalion for their role in the civil war and connections with Iran.

=== 13 September ===
The RSF took the village of al-Ayyara in North Kordofan, pushing back the SAF to the outskirts of El Obeid.

The SAF claimed to have shot down 15 drones over El Obeid. The SLM-Tambour claimed that the drones targeted its leader, Central Darfur governor Mustafa Tambour.

At least five people were killed in an attack by the Wagner Group and auxiliaries from the Central African Republic on Um Dafuq, South Darfur.

=== 15 September ===
The RSF claimed to have retaken Kazgeil and Al-Riash in North Kordofan.

The RSF was accused of forcibly displacing residents of the village of Tura, north of El Fasher, and converting it into a garrison.

=== 16 September ===
The RSF carried out a drone attack that destroyed an ammunition dump within the garrison of the SAF's Fifth Division in El Obeid, resulting in an unspecified number of casualties.

=== 18 September ===
The RSF briefly took the former UNAMID garrison in El Fasher before being forced out by SAF drone strikes.

=== 19 September ===
At least 78 people were killed in an RSF drone strike on a mosque in the al-Daraja neighbourhood of El Fasher.

The government suspended the work permit of Al Arabiya and Al-Hadath bureau chief Lina Yagoub, accusing her of professional misconduct that risked national security in her reporting of the war.

=== 23 September ===
At least 15 people were killed in an RSF drone strike on a market in El Fasher.

=== 24 September ===
Seven people were killed by shelling on a UNICEF compound in El Fasher.

=== 26 September ===
The SAF claimed to have retaken Umm Sumeima from the RSF.

=== 29 September ===
The SAF carried out its first successful supply airdrop to its garrison in El Fasher since April.

=== 30 September ===
Six people were killed by RSF shelling on the Abu Bakr Al-Siddiq School sheltering displaced persons in El Fasher.

== October ==
=== 1 October ===
Sixteen people were killed by RSF shelling in El Fasher.

The SAF claimed to have killed Colombian and Ukrainian mercenaries working for the RSF in an ambush in El Fasher.

=== 2 October ===
TASIS claimed that dozens of civilians were killed or injured in an SAF drone strike on a market in Al Zorg, on the tri-border region with Chad and Libya.

=== 5 October ===
The RSF carried out a massive drone attack on El Obeid and Kosti.

=== 6 October ===
At least 13 people were killed by RSF shelling in El Fasher.

The RSF was accused of summarily executing three people at the Abu Talib school shelter in the Abu Shouk neighborhood of El Fasher. It was also accused of carrying out chemical attacks on the city using drones.

The UNHRC voted 24–11 with 12 abstentions to extend the mandate of the Independent International Fact-Finding Mission investigating atrocities during the civil war until October 2026.

=== 7 October ===
At least 12 people were killed by RSF shelling on the Saudi Hospital for Women and Maternity in El Fasher.

The SAF carried out its second airdrop on its besieged garrison in El Fasher.

=== 8 October ===
At least 35 people were killed by RSF shelling on a mosque sheltering displaced people in the Abushouk al-Hilla neighbourhood of El Fasher.

=== 11 October ===
At least 60 people were killed by RSF shelling on the Dar al-Arqam displacement centre in El Fasher.

At least 20 people were killed in an SAF drone strike on Al-Kuma, North Darfur.

An unspecified number of people were killed by a joint RSF and SPLM-N drone strike in Dalami, South Kordofan.

=== 12 October ===
One person was killed in a drone strike on the headquarters of Prince Abdel Qader Monem Mansour, the Paramount Chief of the Hamar tribes, in En Nahud.

=== 14 October ===
Five people were killed in an RSF drone strike on Debba in Northern State, while two others were killed in a separate attack on the Ad Babiker suburb of Khartoum. Seven SAF soldiers were killed in an RSF drone strike on Abu Jubeiha in the Nuba Mountains of South Kordofan.

=== 15 October ===
The RSF carried out drone strikes on the Khartoum area.

The RSF attacked the town of Abu Gamra in North Darfur following the defection of a vehicle unit of the GSLF to the JDF.

=== 17 October ===
The SAF and the RSF traded blame for a drone attack on a community meeting in Al-Mazroub, North Kordofan that killed 17 people, including Nazir Suleiman Jaber Juma’a Sahl, the leader of the Majaneen tribe.

The JDF claimed to have retaken Abu Gamra.

The SAF and allied forces claimed to have repelled an RSF attack on El Fasher, destroying 10 RSF vehicles and capturing two others.

=== 19 October ===
The SAF carried out a drone attack that destroyed an ammunition depot and set fire to the Government Secretariat in Geneina. Two guards of West Darfur’s de facto governor Al-Tijani Karshoum were killed in the attack, while Karshoum himself was injured. Seven people were killed in an SAF drone strike on the main market of Saraf Omra in North Darfur.

=== 20 October ===
Dozens of SAF soldiers were killed in RSF drone strikes on SAF facilities in El Obeid.

=== 21 October ===
A drone attack was carried out on Khartoum International Airport. Suspected RSF drone attacks caused blackouts in Sennar and Damazin.

=== 22 October ===
A second drone attack was carried out on Khartoum International Airport. Despite this, the airport reopened for the first time since the start of the war.

=== 23 October ===
A third drone attack was carried out on Khartoum International Airport.

Five people were killed in a drone strike on a market in El Fasher.

The Central Bank of Sudan froze the assets of former prime minister Abdalla Hamdok and 38 other politicians on charges of supporting the RSF.

=== 24 October ===
A fourth drone attack was carried out on Khartoum International Airport.

The RSF carried out drone strikes on Singa for the first time, hitting a power station and causing a blackout. It also carried out drone strikes on Sennar and Damazin, injuring two people.

=== 26 October ===
The RSF said that it had taken complete control of the base of the 6th Infantry Division, the main SAF base in El Fasher.

=== 27 October ===
Five volunteers with the International Federation of Red Cross and Red Crescent Societies were killed while three others were reported missing near Bara in an attack while distributing food aid.

Colonel Ahmed Hussein Mustafa, the spokesperson for the SAF and allied forces in El Fasher, was killed during clashes with the RSF in the city.

=== 28 October ===
General al-Burhan confirmed that the SAF had withdrawn from El Fasher, confirming RSF control over the city and ending the Siege of El Fasher. At least 2,500 civilians were massacred by the RSF over the following days, including more than 460 people in the Saudi hospital.

=== 30 October ===
RSF brigadier general and suspected war criminal Al-Fateh Abdullah Idris was arrested by the RSF for filming executions of civilians, having boasted of killing more than 2,000 people.

=== 31 October ===
RSF drone strikes on Kalba displacement centre in Kadugli killed five people and injured four others.

Northern and several states declared full mobilisation as a reaction to the fall of El Fasher.

== November ==
=== 1 November ===
Seven people were killed in an RSF drone strike on an IDP camp in Abbasiya Tagali, South Kordofan.

=== 3 November ===
An RSF drone strike at a funeral killed 40 civilians and injured dozens in El Obeid. Another RSF drone strike on a hospital in Kornoi, North Darfur, leaving multiple casualties and forced the withdrawal of Médecins Sans Frontières from the parts of the state.

The Integrated Food Security Phase Classification confirmed a state of famine in El Fasher and Kadugli.

=== 4 November ===
The SAF claimed to have shot down a drone near Babanusa, while the RSF claimed to have shot down an Ilyushin warplane over the same city. The SAF acknowledged the loss of a cargo aircraft in the city along with its entire crew, but blamed the incident on a technical malfunction.

=== 6 November ===
The RSF agreed to a three-month humanitarian truce agreement proposed by the Quad countries (the United States, Saudi Arabia, the UAE, and Egypt). Meanwhile, the SAF rejected the humanitarian truce, citing crimes against civilians in El Fasher, as well as saying it is a ploy to allow the RSF consolidate control over Darfur and parts of Kordofan.

=== 7 November ===
The RSF carried out drone strikes on Omdurman, Atbara, El-Obeid, and Dalang.

=== 8 November ===
The SAF shot down an RSF drone over El-Obeid.

=== 11 November ===
The Sudan Doctors Network said that the RSF detained seven civilian families around Babanusa. The RSF denied the allegation.

=== 12 November ===
The RSF claimed to have surrounded the headquarters of the SAF's 22nd Division in Babanusa.

=== 13 November ===
The RSF carried out a major drone attack on Merowe.

Three people were killed in a drone attack that damaged the laboratory of the central petroleum processing facility of the Heglig oil field.

=== 15 November ===
The SAF retook Um Dam Haj Ahmed and Kazgeil in North Kordofan from the RSF.

One person was killed in a suspected RSF drone attack on the Bashayer oil processing station in Al Jabalayn, White Nile State.

=== 16 November ===
Ten people were killed while 42 others were injured in an SAF drone strike on the Taqru Mine, north of Al Malha.

=== 17 November ===
The SAF retook Bara from the RSF following a two-week siege.

=== 18 November ===
The RSF released North Darfur health minister Khadija Musa, who had been detained following the fall of El Fasher, along with 25 medical workers.

=== 19 November ===
The China National Petroleum Corporation preemptively terminated an agreement to develop the Heglig oil field, citing "force majeure" amid fighting in the area.

=== 20 November ===
The Awlad Gammari (Sons of Gamari), an SAF-allied militia group based in Dongola, staged a mutiny, resulting in clashes with the SAF that left two people dead.

The European Union imposed sanctions on Abdul Rahim Dagalo for violations committed by the RSF in Darfur.

=== 21 November ===
The SAF suppressed the Awlad Gammari revolt, resulting in dozens of arrests.

=== 24 November ===
The RSF declared a unilateral three-month humanitarian ceasefire.

=== 25 November ===
The SAF claimed to have repelled an RSF assault on the 22nd Infantry Division headquarters in Babanusa.

=== 29 November ===
The SPLM-N (al-Hilu) claimed that 45 people were killed in an SAF drone strike on the village of Kumo in the Nuba mountains of South Kordofan.

=== 30 November ===
The SAF retook the villages of Tabassa, Al-Damira, Al-Shawaya, Al-Jubailat, Al-Sanadra, Gurdud and Jama in South Kordofan from the SPLM-N (al-Hilu).

== December ==
=== 1 December ===
The RSF captured the 22nd Infantry Division headquarters in Babanusa and claimed full control over the city.

The SPLM-N (al-Hilu) claimed to have retaken the town of Qardoud Nama in South Kordofan from the SAF.

=== 2 December ===
The commander of the SAF's 22nd Infantry Division, Major-General Abdelmajid al-Haj, and an unidentified brigadier general who commanded the SAF's 170th Artillery Brigade were killed in an RSF ambush while retreating from Babanusa towards Heglig.

The SAF retook the town of Mabsouta in South Kordofan from the SPLM-N (al-Hilu), which had occupied the area since 2011.

=== 4 December ===
At least 116 people, including 43 children, were killed in a drone strike blamed on the RSF in Kalogi, South Kordofan.

A WFP convoy was attacked in Hamrat El Sheikh, North Kordofan, damaging a truck and injuring its driver.

=== 5 December ===
The RSF accused the SAF of carrying out an air attack on a market in Adikon, near the Adre border crossing, that killed 20 people, mostly traders from Chad.

=== 6 December ===
The RSF carried out a drone strike on an electricity substation in Ad-Damazin, causing a major blackout.

=== 8 December ===
The RSF seized control over the Heglig oil field.

=== 9 December ===
Seven members of a Misseriya tribal delegation and several dozen RSF fighters were killed in a SAF drone strike on Heglig.

The United States imposed sanctions on several individuals and entities linked to a transnational network that recruited former Colombian soldiers to work as mercenaries for the RSF.

=== 10 December ===
The South Sudan People's Defence Forces deployed personnel to secure the Heglig oilfield following a "tripartite agreement" involving South Sudanese president Salva Kiir, General al-Burhan, and Hemedti to secure vital energy infrastructure in the area that saw the withdrawal of both the SAF and the RSF.

=== 12 December ===
The United Kingdom imposed sanctions on four senior RSF commanders, namely Abdul Rahim Dagalo, Gedo Hamdan Ahmed, Brigadier General Al-Fateh Abdullah Idris; and Field Commander Tijani Ibrahim Moussa Mohamed, over their role in the El Fasher massacre.

=== 13 December ===
Three people were killed in an RSF drone strike on a square located near a police station in the Tayba neighbourhood of El-Obeid.

Six Bangladeshi UN peacekeepers were killed in a drone strike on their base in Kadugli.

=== 15 December ===
The Sudanese Congress Party dismissed six officials, including former North Darfur Governor Mohamed Hassan Arabi, for co-signing the charter of the RSF-aligned TASIS alliance.

=== 17 December ===
Seven people were killed in SPLM-N (al-Hilu) shelling in Dalang. The SPLM-N (al-Hilu) accused the SAF of carrying out a drone strike on Al-Natel that also killed seven people.

=== 18 December ===
Two civil defence personnel were killed in a drone strike on the Al-Mogran transformer station in Atbara.

=== 19 December ===
The RSF claimed to have taken the village of Borno, north of Kadugli.

=== 20 December ===
Ten people were killed in a drone strike on Al-Malha.

=== 22 December ===
The SAF retook the village of Alouba, southwest of Er Rahad, from the RSF.

=== 24 December ===
The RSF captured the towns of Abu Qamra and Ambara, while the SAF and JDF withdrew towards Tine and Karnoi along the Chadian border which are the last areas in Darfur under SAF control. The RSF also claimed to have recaptured Alouba, two days after it was captured by the SAF.

=== 25 December ===
The RSF claimed to have taken Kornoi in North Darfur, which was denied by the JDF.

The RSF accused the SAF of carrying out an attack on a fuel market in Nyala that left an unspecified number of casualties.

=== 26 December ===
At least 17 people were killed in SAF drone strikes on Geneina. Twelve others were killed in an SAF drone strike on Biyam Jald in South Kordofan.

Two Chadian soldiers were killed after their camp in Tine, near the border with Sudan, was attacked by a drone that originated from the latter country. Both the SAF and the Chadian National Army blamed the RSF for the attack.

=== 30 December ===
Thirty-five people were killed in an RSF drone strike on Dalang.

The RSF and the SPLM-N (al-Hilu) seized the Al-Taqatu’ junction in South Kordofan, effectively cutting the main highway between Kadugli and Dalang. Both forces also seized SAF garrisons in Al-Taqatu’, Al-Balf, and Hajar Daliba.

=== 31 December ===
The SAF retook Al-Rayash, Kazgail, Al-Hammadi, and Ed Dubeibat, south of El-Obeid from the RSF, while the RSF took Al-Kuwayk, 18 km (11 mi) west of Kadugli.
