= Battle of Dilling =

Battle in Sudan

- Part of the Sudanese civil war and the Kordofan Campaign
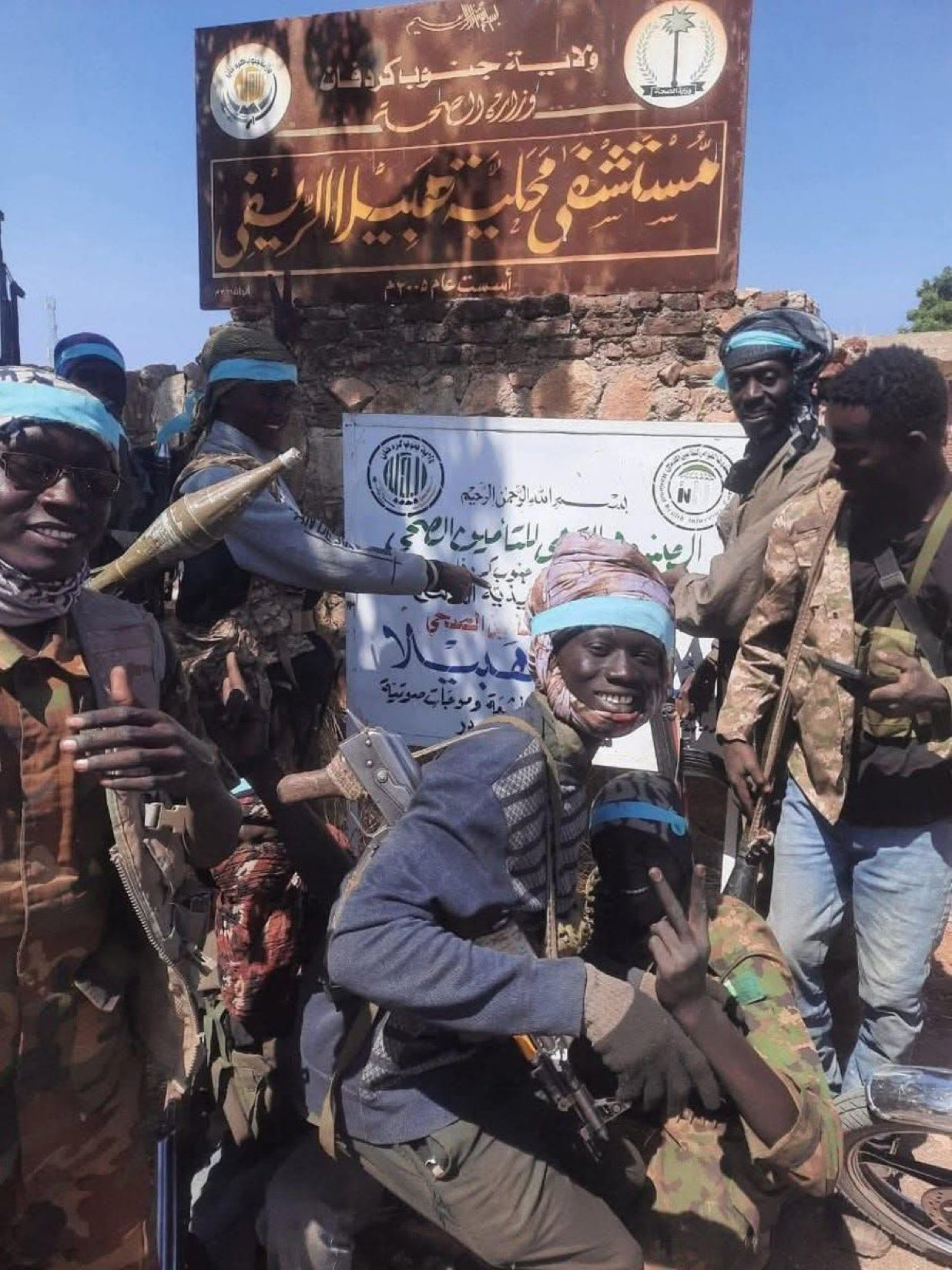
- SAF soldiers in Habila before lifting the siege of Dilling
Date	21 June 2023 – 24 February 2025 (1 year, 8 months and 3 days); Siege: 21 June 2023 – 26 January 2026
Location	Dalang, South Kordofan
Result	SAF victory

Belligerents
Sudanese government; Sudanese Armed Forces; SPLM-N (Agar)	Rapid Support Forces: New Sudan; SPLM-N (al-Hilu) (from February 2025); New Sudan; SPLM-N (al-Hilu) (June 2023 – February 2025)

Casualties and losses
1 vehicle captured	5 vehicles destroyed 21 vehicles captured
- +2 civilians killed, +3 injured

The battle of Dilling was a siege for control of Dilling which began on 26 June 2023 when Rapid Support Forces invaded the city. The Sudanese Armed Forces successfully defended and recaptured Dilling from the RSF. Sudan People's Liberation Movement–North attacked and sieged Dilling from the south. It was an urban battle of the Sudanese civil war (2023–present).

== Background ==
Dalang (Dilling) is a city in South Kordofan Wilayat. After the war broke out in Ramadan 2023, The RSF gained control of Abu Zabad, a city to the north of Dalang. They temporarily captured the city in the summer of 2023. SPLM-N deployed forces and began from controlled territory in cities such as Sarafayah and Kadugli.

== Battle ==
On 21 June, fighters of the SPLM-N (El Hilu) took control of the town's police station in an attack on the western and southern sides of the town. The fighters later withdrew causing an undisclosed amount of army and police casualties. They also took control of the road that connected the town to Kadugli.

On 1 July, the SAF launched airstrikes on SPLM-N positions in the west of the town. On 15 July, the SPLM-N took control of the Karkaraya oilfield which is near the town. The next day, the RSF ambushed an SAF convoy North of the town, killing and wounding several soldiers and forcing them to disperse. The RSF also seized one military vehicle. On 14 August, a landmine explosion that struck a cart carrying a family to their farm killed 2 of the members and injured 3 others.

In January 2024, the town fell under SPLM-N control. This happened after the group made a deal with the SAF to fight the RSF and its allies in the region. On 10 January, the SPLM-N and SAF repelled an RSF attack, destroying 5 vehicles and capturing 21 others.

On 30 July, the SAF attacked SPLM-N positions in the town and seized the Karkaba and Jabal Koun areas that are both 5 kilometers south of the town.

On 13 January 2025, the SAF took control of Karkaraia and Hajar Al-Jawad on the road connecting the town to Kadugli. On 24 February, the SAF was able to partially break the siege of town and of Kadugli and captured the Al-Karkal, Koli, and Kiqa areas north of Kadugli and the Hajar Al-Jawad and Karkariya areas in the south of the town.

On December 30, the SPLM-N (al-Hilu), supported by the RSF, recaptured part of the road connecting Dilling with Kadugli, thus resuming the siege of the city after 10 months. The RSF attacked the city with a drone, killing at least 35 people, including soldiers, and wounding dozens. On December 31, the RSF and the SPLM-N (al-Hilu) shelled the city with artillery.

On January 2, 2026, SPLM-N Chief of Staff Izzat Kuku Angelo called on officers and soldiers of the 54th Infantry Brigade in Dilling to surrender the town to avoid loss of life, property, and infrastructure.

Shelling and drone attacks by the RSF and the SPLM-N (al-Hilu) intensified. On January 15, the RSF carried out a drone strike on a market, killing at least 12 people and wounding more than 16. The town experienced a massive displacement of the population toward North Kordofan, which carried dangerous risks as civilians faced widespread violations by the RSF.

On January 26, SAF captured Habila and Al-Takmah, ending the siege of the city once again. Then on February 3, SAF recaptured a part of the road connecting Dilling with Kadugli, which was captured by SPLM-N (al-Hilu).

=== Conditions ===
Sudan War Monitor reported war crimes including two hanged half-stripped bodies in Dilling amidst an RSF attack on 10 January 2024 repelled by SAF and SPLM-N, and combat in Western Dilling; and the handling of a killed SAF soldier that was shown off in a marketplace. Intense combat involved collapsing some residences with fire. A recorder said while filming the site, "Dilling is the graveyard of the Janjaweed". He also expected RSF-backed Janjaweed soldiers to experience the same fate of those two. Telecommunications were heavily restricted and dealt with outages. Airstrikes were impacting in the skies above the battle and drew attention to the part-razed and infrastructurally impaired city. Displaced refugees exited the city in the thousands and were replaced by militants. Report indicates the humanitarian problems refugees faced included lack of medical resources, roads and sheltering in overfilled cities such as El Obeid.

=== Fighting in Kordofan ===
Other areas in the Kordofan region that held intense military action included Babanusa, where fighting threatened to push more displacement. The RSF belligerated an SAF garrison in Habila. In response, South Sudan allocated some of its military to its Northern border. Fugitives fleeing elsewhere experienced shelter problems. RSF targeted oilfields near the border after holding those in Baleela.
