= HSDL =

HSDL may refer to:

- Dilling Airport
- Homeland Security Digital Library
