= Battle of Kadugli =

Siege of Kadugli, South Kordofan State, Sudan

Siege of Kadugli
- Part of the Sudanese civil war (2023–present) and the Kordofan Campaign
| Date | 8 June 2023 – present (3 years, 5 months and 1 day) |
| Location | Kadugli, South Kordofan, Sudan |

Belligerents
| Sudanese government; Sudanese Armed Forces; Sudanese Air Force | (Sudan) Government of Peace and Unity (from April 2025); Rapid Support Forces; SPLM-N (al-Hilu) (from February 2025); SPLM-N (al-Hilu) (June 2023 – February 2025) |

Commanders and leaders
| Jau Kafi; Kafi Tayyar Al-Badeen | Abdelaziz al-Hilu; Izzat Koko Angelo |

Units involved
| 14th Infantry Division; 54th Infantry Brigade; Sudanese Air Force; Al-Badeen's militia | Unknown |

Casualties and losses
| Unknown | 300–400 killed (by September 2023) |
- 50,000+ displaced

The Siege of Kadugli is in Kadugli, South Kordofan State, Sudan, during the current Sudanese civil war. It involves two aligned rebel factions, the SPLM-N (al-Hilu faction) and the Rapid Support Forces, that are trying to capture the city from the Sudanese Armed Forces.

== Background ==
Kadugli is the capital of South Kordofan in Sudan, a region which was affected by an insurgency of the Sudan People's Liberation Movement–North (SPLM-N). The fighting was both a spillover of the previous Second Sudanese Civil War between 1983 and 2005 between the SAF and SPLA, as well as ethnically motivated, as the local Nuba people have historically suffered under oppression by northern Sudanese regimes and accordingly supported the SPLM-N. In 2017, the SPLM-N split into two major factions. The rebels in South Kordofan aligned with Abdelaziz al-Hilu, an ethnic Nuba, who opposed compromises with the Sudanese government. Even after the Sudanese Revolution of 2019, al-Hilu opposed the agreements between other SPLM-N factions and the country's new leadership, stating that reforms were a prerequisite to peace.

In 2020, five people were killed in the city by militiamen. In 2023, tensions within the Sudanese government escalated into a civil war between the Sudanese Armed Forces (SAF) and Rapid Support Forces (RSF). Most of the RSF troops in South Kordofan State retreated without a fight, however, allowing the SAF to occupy the former RSF camp in Kadugli. The SAF soon also sent most of its local garrison troops to other, strategically more important war zones; only Kadugli remained a SAF stronghold due to the continued presence of the 14th Infantry Division under Jau Kafi. Either way, the new civil war spurred fears among the SPLM-N (al-Hilu) that the ethnic conflicts of the previous insurgency could resurface, prompting it to mobilize and eventually take up arms against both SAF as well as RSF.

== Battle ==
By 8 June 2023, the RSF had closed the road between Kadugli and El Obeid depriving the city of supplies. At this point, fighting had spread to the smaller cities in neighboring Darfur. Meanwhile, SPLKM-N (al-Hilu) forces converged on Kadugli, while declaring its intention to rid the region of "the filth of occupation". The local SAF garrison pushed back an RSF attack on one of its bases in the area, as the SPLM-N forces began besieging the city.

On 21 June, the SPLM-N (al-Hilu) started an assault on the SAF's 54th Infantry Brigade around Kadugli. The military claimed that it had repelled the attack, while the Sudanese Air Force deployed MiGs and Sukhoi aircraft to bomb SPLM-N (al-Hilu) troops and bases around the city. Fighting also began at other towns in the region such as Dalang and al-Dibaybat. On 15 July, both the SPLM-N (al-Hilu) and the RSF launched major attacks around South Kordofan including at Kadugli. However, the two factions do not seem to coordinate or be allied; instead, both exploit each other's operations against their common enemy, the SAF. On 1 August 2023, protests began in Kadugli against the ongoing clashes in the city, with protesters also denouncing the war and the country's violations against women. By mid-August, the SPLM-N had captured ten military bases around Kadugli and was repeatedly attacking the town itself. The fighting for Kadugli disrupted the regional supply chains, causing food shortages. In addition, the SPLM-N attacks on Kadugli were not popular among its members due to substantial losses as well as a perceived lack of a grand strategy among the rebel leadership.

By early September, 50,000 civilians had fled the area, as the SPLM-N continued it attempts to capture the city. However, combat in area suddenly ceased around this time. Journalists of Darfur24 subsequently revealed that SPLM-N members were meeting with officers of the 14th Infantry Division in and around Kadugli, attempting to mediate an end of combat. However, the talks failed and the battle resumed. SPLM-N chief of staff Izzat Koko Angelo reportedly also sent a letter to Brigadier General Kafi Tayyar Al-Badeen, calling on him to defect. Al-Badeen led a South Kordofan militia in the area of Kadugli, fighting alongside the Sudanese Army. The commander publicly declared his loyalty to the military, stating that the letter was designed to sow discord.

On 27 September, the SPLM-N began a new attack on Kadugli, invading the city's Jabal Hajar al-Mak Rahal and Daraja Altalta neighbourhoods while launching artillery strikes using Katyusha rocket launchers. The assault was repelled by the local garrison, but the rebels attacked again on the next day, this time targeting the Jabal Hajar al-Mak Rahal and Talo neighbourhoods. In October, fighting between the SAF and SPLM-N continued between Kadugli and Dalang, concentrated at the villages of al-Takama, El Faragil, and Karkaria. Clashes also took place at Damba, west of Kadugli.

On 1 May 2024, gunmen murdered Hamdan Ali Al-Boulad, emir of the Rawwaqa branch of the Hawazma tribe, in Kadugli. Six days later, another tribal leader, Suleiman Sanad Suleiman Al-Shein of the Al-Dulmba branch of the Hawazma tribe, was also killed in the city. An anonymous local community leader accused the 14th Infantry Division of organizing the murders in order to incite ethnic tensions to stabilize its own control over the area. The killings of the tribal leaders caused ethnic militants to take up arms in and around Kadugli, threatening a further escalation of the local unrest. At this point, the siege of Kadugli was still ongoing, with SPLM-N rebels holding the countryside to the east and the RSF controlling the strategic Al-Quz area to the north. However, the Sudanese government had reportedly agreed to a deal with the SPLM-N to allow the transport of humanitarian aid into territories controlled by both sides in South Kordofan, including Kadugli.

On 3 February 2025, shelling took place in the city, killing 44 people, and injuring 70 others. The SAF claimed that al-Hilu's SPLM-N faction was responsible, but the insurgents denied the claim.

On 24 February 2025, the Sudanese Armed Forces pushed back the SPLM-N (al-Hilu) group from the area to the north of the city, opening up the road to SAF controlled Dalang.

On 4 November, the IPC's Famine Review Committee reported with "reasonable evidence" that Kadugli is in an IPC5 famine, the most severe level of food insecurity on the IPC scale.

On 3 February 2026, the SAF said it broke the siege on Kadugli. Military sources told Sudan Tribune that forces including the 16th Infantry Division, paramilitary volunteers, and Joint Forces "entered the city following clashes in Al-Taqatu and Al-Kuwaik."

Since 3 March 2026, the RSF said they split Kadugli from the rest of the road after a fierce battle of El Kuweik, the SAF claims they re-entered the city, the situation is unclear, this could be a crisis again as the siege restarted and limited supplies can be airdroped from Dalang, the siege ended briefly for 4 weeks between 3 February and 3 March 2026, however the RSF haven't entered the city of Kadugli.
