= Kadugli Airport =

- IATA: KDX; ICAO: HSLI

Summary
- Airport type: Public / Military
- Operator: Government
- Location: Kadugli, Sudan
- Elevation AMSL: 1,848 ft (563 m)
- Coordinates: 11°08′16″N 029°42′04″E

Map
- Location within Sudan

Runways
Direction	Length		Surface
Direction	m	ft	Surface
06/24	2,553	8,376	Asphalt

Kadugli Airport (IATA: KDX, ICAO: HSLI) is an airport serving Kadugli (also spelled Kaduqli), the capital city of the state of South Kurdufan (or South Kordofan) in Sudan.

== Facilities ==
The airport resides at an elevation of 1,848 feet (563 m) above mean sea level. It has one runway designated 06/24 with an asphalt surface measuring 2,553 by 53 metres (8,376 ft × 174 ft).

== Kadugli Air Base ==
The airport hosts Sudanese Air Force Helicopter Squadron (Mil Mi-8, Mil Mi-24, Mil Mi-35).

== Incidents ==
- On 10 November 1979, Douglas C-47B ST-AHH of the National Agriculture Organisation crashed at Kadugli Airport and was destroyed by the subsequent fire.
