= 1965 Babanusa massacre =

Massacre in Sudan

Babanusa massacre
- 1965 Babanusa massacre (Sudan)
- Location: 11°20′N 27°48′E; Babanusa, West Kordofan
- Date: March 1965
- Target: Dinka
- Attack type: Mass murder, Revenge killing
- Weapon: Kerosene
- Deaths: 72
- Perpetrator: Local Misseriya civilians

The 1965 Babanusa Massacre happened in March 1965, when 72 Ngok Dinka civilians were burned by Misseria Arabs in the city of Babanusa in Sudan.

== Background ==
The massacre is attributed to the First Sudanese Civil War and the fighting between Anyanya and the government forces. In Abyei, where the Ngok Dinka traditionally live, there had been rising tension between the Misseriya pastoralists who seasonally migrated to Abyei and the Ngok Dinka who lived in Abyei. The tensions between the two groups was attributed to two attacks which took place a year before the massacre. The first attack happened in Gogrial, when the Anyanya attacked Misseriya merchants who had settled in the town. The second attack happened in the capital of Sudan, Khartoum, when northerners and southerners clashed over rumours surrounding the interior minister Clement Mboro. In 1965, when the Misseria tribes started their migration towards Abyei, reports emerged of them heavily arming themselves. The Ngok Dinka to ask the government for protection. The government responded by transporting Ngok Dinka civilians from Abyei to nearby Sudanese towns of Babanusa, Al-Fulah and Muglad.

== The massacre ==
In March 1965, Ngok Dinka civilians gathered at the police station of Babanusa to seek protection from attacking Misseriya. A group of Misseriya women and children burned down the police station with kerosene, killing all 72 Dinkas hiding inside. The police station had 17 officers who were armed with rifles and four tear gas cylinders, none of which were used.

The attack led to long-lasting divisions between the Ngok Dinka and Misseriya. After the attack, Misseriya were increasingly recruited to government militaries and the Ngok Dinka started to join the Anyanya rebels en masse. The massacre continues to be remembered by the Ngok Dinka. During the demonstrations on 4 March 2011, Ngok Dinka protesters outside an UNMIS compound shouted slogans referring to the Babanusa massacre.
