= 2025 Kadugli shelling =

Civilian shelling in Kadugli, Sudan (2025)

2025 Kadugli Shelling
- Part of Battle of Kadugli and War crimes during the Sudanese civil war (2023–present)
- Location: Kadugli, South Kordofan, Sudan
- Date: February 3, 2025
- Deaths: 44
- Injuries: 70
- Perpetrators: SPLM-N (al-Hilu) (claimed by SAF, Denied by SPLM-N)

On February 3, 2025, 44 people were killed and dozens more were wounded in Kadugli when artillery shelling hit the city's main market and other residential areas within the city. The SPLM-N was accused of the attacks by the SAF to destabilize the area as part of the ongoing siege over Kadugli and fighting in the South Kordofan State.

== Background ==
The war in Sudan began on April 15, 2023, when RSF forces began attacking SAF positions in the capital of Khartoum along with other cities in the Darfur region to overthrow the government. This caused Sudan to plunge into warfare, with many cities and towns being fought over between the two sides in Darfur, Khartoum, and the Kordofan regions.

In June 2023, the al-Hilu faction of the Sudan People's Liberation Movement–North broke the ceasefire agreement with the SAF and attacked SAF positions in Kadugli, Kurmuk, and Dilling. The SPLM-N took control of the road that connected Kadugli with El Obeid and began besieging the city. This siege was still in place at the time of the attacks.

== Attack ==
On February 3, dozens of artillery shells were fired by SPLM-N forces that were positioned in mountains east of the city. The artillery struck the Kadugli Grand Market along with residential neighborhoods and temporary shelters in schools. The attacks killed 44 people, including 21 children and the imam of the Kadugli old mosque, Sheikh Nizar El Tom. 70 more were injured, with 29 of the injured being children. The dead and wounded were treated in Military Medical Hospital and Kadugli Hospital within the city.

== Aftermath ==
The Governor of South Kordofan, Mohamed Ibrahim, condemned the attack by saying that it was a human right's violation and that the SPLM-N aimed to destabilize the region. He also vowed to continue military operations to clear the mountains surrounding the city and open up the road to Dilling. The commander of the 14th infantry division in Kadugli later claimed that government forces had retaken the mountains from which the artillery was fired. The health minister for South Kordofan also condemned the attack

The SPLM-N initially did not comment on the attacks. They later denied any responsibility for the attack, and claimed that the SAF had carried out airstrikes on rebel controlled areas in city and killed and injured civilians while forcing them to evacuate to surrounding areas. They also claimed to have confronted the army and inflicted heavy losses.

== See also ==
- October 2024 Sudan airstrikes
- Kabkabiya market airstrike
- May 2023 Mayo shelling
- 2025 Omdurman market attack
- Al-Kadaris and Al-Khelwat massacres
