= Alouba =

Village in Sudan

- Village
- Country: Sudan
- State: North Kordofan
- Time zone: UTC+2 (CAT)

Alouba is a village in North Kordofan, Sudan. Alouba is located near Er Rahad, southeast of the city of El Obeid.

== History ==
On 13 and 14 April 2025 the Sudanese Armed Forces (SAF) and the Al-Bara' ibn Malik Battalion was accused by United Nations of executing 36 civilians in the villages of Alouba and Umm Arada. On 22 December, SAF retook the village from the Rapid Support Forces (RSF). On 24 December, the RSF claimed to have recaptured Alouba. On January 18 2026, RSF accused SAF and SAF aligned militias of killing 220 herders in the attacks in villages of Alouba, Um Qalib, Debiker, and Al-Adiya Qar’an.
