= El Tagola =

Village in Sudan

El Tagola التقولا
- Location in Sudan
- Coordinates: 10°50′42″N 30°24′46″E
- Country: Sudan; De facto: New Sudan
- State: South Kordofan
- Time zone: Central Africa Time, GMT + 3

El Tagola (Arabic: التقولا), or Al-Takula, is a village in South Kordofan, Sudan. It's known for its gold mines that used toxic cyanide for extraction. There have been reports of protests and conflicts in the area related to the mining activities.

== History ==
In March 2017, in protest against the use of cyanide, residents of Talodi, South Kordofan State, set fire to the El Tagola gold extraction factory and its machinery. Despite security presence, the factory workers fled. Meanwhile, citizens of Baloula administrative unit appealed for health services and the establishment of a midwife training centre due to a lack of medical staff.

In July 2017, the people living near the gold mines, in El Leri, Kalogi, and Talodi, resorted to the Sudanese Armed Forces (SAF) for protection and protested in front of the garrison in Talodi. There were also reports of protests against the use of cyanide in the gold extraction process due to its highly toxic nature and potential environmental impact.

In October 2019, the Rapid Support Forces (RSF) raided an El Tagola mine in South Kordofan, intercepting activists collecting evidence of harmful substances used in mining. The militia opened fire, causing injuries and forcing workers to flee. The market was looted, some sites were set on fire, and the militia fled. The army arrived too late to intervene. Following the incident, a joint committee of the SAF and anti-gold mining committees in Talodi locality in South Kordofan managed to release 14 people who were detained by the RSF government militia in the El Tagola mine. The detainees were reportedly placed in a closed container as a makeshift detention centre.

In June 2022, three gold miners from Anqartu were arrested by the SAF in El Tagola while returning from SPLM-controlled areas. They were detained for nine days, had their money confiscated, and were ordered to leave the town. The Hodo Centre for Human Rights expressed concern over the security situation and called for an investigation into the confiscated funds.

During the on-going Sudanese war that started on 15 April 2023, the Sudan People's Liberation Movement–North (SPLM-N) led by Abdelaziz al-Hilu (SPLM-N El Hilu) has reportedly attacked the Sudanese Armed Forces' (SAF) garrisons in El Tagola. The SPLM-N El Hilu took control of the garrison and the area since July.
