= Dalanj University =

Public university in South Kordofan State, Sudan

Coordinates: 12.060550°N 29.663032°E

- جامعة الدلنج
- Type: Public
- Established: 1995; 30 years ago
- Location: Dalang, South Kordofan, Sudan
- President: Prof. Adam Abkar Mahmoud
- Website: www.dalanjuniversity.edu.sd

Dalanj University is a public university in Dalang, South Kordofan State, Sudan.

The Teachers college was established in 1995 AD. This was followed in 1999 by the Centre for Peace Studies, Computer Center and College of additional studies, which evolved into the Faculty of Community Development. The Graduate School was established in 2001. As of September 2011, the university was a member in good standing of the Association of African Universities.
