= Al-Masoudiya =

Town in Sudan

Al-Masoudiya المسعودية
- Town
- Location of Al-Masoudiya in Sudan
- Country: Sudan
- State: Khartoum
- Time zone: UTC+2 (CAT)

Al-Masoudiya (Arabic: المسعودية) is a town in Khartoum State, Sudan. The town is located 25 miles south of the capital city Khartoum.

== History ==
On 5 February 2025, the Sudanese Armed Forces (SAF) claimed to have retaken Al-Masoudiya.
