= Siege of El Obeid =

Siege in the Sudanese civil war (2023–present)

- Part of the Sudanese civil war (2023–present) and the Kordofan campaign (2023–present)
Date	Battle: April 15 – September 1, 2023; Siege: April 15, 2023 – February 23, 2025; Partial siege and attacks: 2025 – Nov 14, 2026
Location	El Obeid, North Kordofan, Sudan
Result	SAF victory: SAF repels several RSF attacks on the city between April 15 and May 23, 2023; RSF besieges El Obeid from June 2023; By September, SAF retains positions in the city, while RSF forces continue to besiege it from outside; On February 23, 2025, the Sudanese army fully lifts the siege of El Obeid.; 2025-2026: renewed RSF attacks and siege-like conditions; November 2026: SAF captures remaining settlements around El Obeid and enters West Kordofan

Belligerents
Government of Sudan; SAF; 18th Division "Camel Forces"; 5th Infantry Division; North Kordofan Police; El Obeid Resistance Committee	(Sudan) Government of Peace and Unity (from Apr. 2025); RSF

Commanders and leaders
Fadlallah al-Tom; Faisal Alhassan; Ahmed Ali	Unknown

Units involved
18th Division "Camel Forces"; 5th Infantry Division; North Kordofan Police; Sayyad Force	Unknown

Casualties and losses
31+ military killed 20+ police killed	Unknown
- Hundreds of civilians killed

The siege of El Obeid was an ongoing siege in El Obeid, North Kordofan, Sudan, during the Sudanese civil war, which began as a full encirclement and later became partial.

The battle began on April 15 2023, when the Rapid Support Forces (RSF) captured the El Obeid airport from the Sudanese Army contingent in the city. Throughout April and May, the Sudanese Army repelled several RSF assaults on the city, but by June 2023, the RSF had fully surrounded the city and laid siege to it. Although the army said it had broken the siege in February 2025, the respite was short-lived. By mid-2026, UN officials said civilians in and around El-Obeid had been living under siege-like conditions for 18 months, with renewed RSF partial encirclement, drone and artillery attacks. RSF gains were reversed following a SAF counteroffensive across North Kordofan in late 2026, and the RSF fell back to West Kordofan, ending its attempt to besiege El Obeid. The siege caused shortages of food, water, fuel, medicine and other essential goods.

== Prelude ==
=== War in Darfur ===
In 2003, the predominantly non-Arab Justice and Equality Movement (JEM) and Sudan People's Liberation Movement (SPLM), rebel movements based in southern and western Sudan (Darfur) launched attacks against Sudanese Army bases and their allies, the predominantly Arab Janjaweed militia. JEM and SPLM launched the attacks in opposition to dictator Omar al-Bashir, who promptly declared war against the militias. The war soon spread to central-south Sudan, in the provinces of North Kordofan, South Kordofan, and Blue Nile. Since 2003, the war has killed hundreds of thousands of people across Darfur, and displaced many more.

Throughout the war in Darfur, the city of El Obeid, the capital of North Kordofan, has seen a smaller amount of violence compared to its southern and western counterparts. The city was primarily a hub for international aid to Darfur and South Sudan in the early 2010s. El Obeid was also the center of several peace talks between the Bashir regime and SPLM–N rebels (after their split between Malik Agar and Abdelaziz al-Hilu in 2017). In 2019, during the Sudanese revolution, six protesters, including four children, were killed in a massacre by the Rapid Support Forces that drew heavy condemnation from international and Sudanese media. From 2021 to 2023, the city saw heavy protests about a lack of available drinking water. El Obeid is considered a strategic city in Sudan due to having the only airport in North Kordofan, with the airport being a center for United Nations missions in the disputed Abyei region. The city is also known as the connecting point between Khartoum and Darfur.

=== RSF-Sudanese tensions ===
The Rapid Support Forces (RSF), which formed as a reconstitution of the Janjaweed in 2014, grew in political and military influence following a 2021 military coup against the civilian–military transitional government established following the Sudanese Revolution two years earlier. Tensions between the two coup leaders, Sudanese Army commander Abdel Fattah al-Burhan and RSF commander Hemedti, increased in early 2023 over disputes about absorbing the RSF into the Sudanese Armed Forces. These tensions came to a head on April 15, 2023, despite attempts at peace. RSF forces seized Khartoum International Airport, Sudanese bases in Merowe, and attacked Sudanese soldiers across Darfur and southern Sudan, including El Obeid.

== Siege ==
=== Initial skirmishes (April 15–16) ===
The RSF claimed control of the El Obeid Airport on April 15, the first day of hostilities, along with the airports in Khartoum and Merowe. The Sudanese Doctors' Union and local morgues stated that same day that thirteen people were killed in the city, and twenty more were injured. Three more people were killed, and eleven wounded, on April 16. On April 17, Sudanese forces in El Obeid claimed to have destroyed several RSF sites in the city in the previous days, and residents reported the day was a "cautious calm". The local hospital, the El Daman hospital, closed after Sudanese soldiers stormed it in the days prior. RSF soldiers instructed civilians on April 17 to evacuate the neighborhoods surrounding the now-destroyed airport due to the possibility of further clashes. Between April 17 and April 19, the situation in El Obeid was relatively calm.

=== RSF offensive on the city (April 20–23) ===
Clashes escalated at 9:00am on April 20 in the city following an RSF offensive against the south, west, and north of the city, with civilians stating fierce fighting took place at the El Obeid market and Sudanese Army's 5th Infantry division headquarters, along with attacks in the northern neighborhoods. An RSF attack on policemen that day killed 20 and injured 40, with an unknown number of civilians injured and killed. Sources in El Obeid, including doctors and the local doctors' union, stated at least 30 civilians were killed and 70 injured since fighting began on April 15. Several homes were also destroyed in Sudanese Army airstrikes on the city. Despite a nationwide ceasefire in effect from April 20, a worker for the International Organization for Migration was killed by crossfire in El Obeid on April 21. Videos published that same day by Al Arabiya showed the extent of destruction in the city. By April 23, many civilians living in al-Bant neighborhood had fled, and around 400 families sought shelter in al-Shorouk school. Other schools throughout the city also housed refugees. That same day, the Sudanese Army declared complete control of El Obeid.

On April 25, residents of El Obeid began burials of civilians and soldiers killed in the fighting. North Kordofan governor Fadlallah Mohammed Ali al-Tom also convened emergency meetings with state security and other officials regarding the battle in El Obeid, along with declaring a state of curfew and a ban on smuggling. Al-Tom stated at least 100 civilians were injured in the renewed fighting. On April 27, the Cathedral of El Obeid was damaged in clashes. Despite the ban on smuggling, looting was prevalent in El Obeid in early May, and humanitarian warehouses were being raided. In early May, residents of El Obeid stated Sudanese army officials warned of the possibility of clashes, and ordered civilians not to attend the main market.

=== Second RSF offensive and skirmishes (May 4–23) ===
On May 4, RSF forces launched a second attack on the city from the east and west, with fighting occurring at the 5th Infantry Division headquarters and the al-Abyad neighborhood. Local hospitals reported 12 people were killed and 30 wounded, excluding the injured who could not make it to the hospital. Of the twelve killed, seven were children. Five Sudanese soldiers were killed in an RSF attack on a training center in the west of the city. In the renewed attacks, RSF forces took control of the al-Bant neighborhood, and heavy shelling occurred in Shikan Square and the al-Wahda neighborhood. Three civilians were also killed in an attack on the al-Sahwa neighborhood. Analysts suggested that the RSF attempted intense raids on El Obeid to cut off the growing battles in Darfur and Khartoum. The Sudanese Army claimed to have repelled the attack, although skirmishes continued in the days afterward.

On May 7, 15 people were killed in an RSF attack on a village near El Obeid. By May 16, the El Haman hospital was the sole hospital in El Obeid, and was running at 50% capacity. Meanwhile, the closure of the city's markets and fighting on the outskirts caused a collapse in the gum arabic market, a staple of the economy in El Obeid. A skirmish on May 23 enabled the RSF to consolidate control over the roads leading south and west of the city. By late May, the RSF began making deals with tribal leaders surrounding El Obeid to protect the city from Sudanese Army reinforcements.

=== Battle of El Obeid (May 30-September 1) ===
Clashes erupted again on May 30, after a failed RSF attempt to capture the El Obeid airport. However, another RSF attack on the Arab Market in the city succeeded. Three civilians were killed in the airport attack. On June 2, World Food Programme warehouses were ransacked, with the organization releasing a statement deploring the attack. By June 8, schools housing refugees had closed, and the city was without power and water. Infant mortality rates in the city had spiked. Humanitarian supplies were unable to reach the city, due to raids by RSF forces on the roads between El Obeid and White Nile state. On June 13, RSF forces captured the northeastern road leading to El Obeid, near the town of Bara, thereby placing the city under full siege. RSF militiamen attempted to hijack cars from Bara civilians, but protests erupted. The RSF also conducted attacks on El Rahad. However, electricity was restored in El Obeid on June 13.

Residents of El Obeid stated on June 14 that the Sudanese Army launched airstrikes against RSF positions in the city. This was followed up on June 15 by aerial bombings by the SAF, displacing 64 families. Around this time, RSF forces also raided the El Obeid oil refinery, which had been deserted by Sudanese Army troops at the start of the war. Fighting continued in El Rahad as well, with civilians digging trenches to defend against RSF attacks. Just a day later on June 16, the killing of six suspected RSF fighters by civilians in El Rahad, and the reprisal RSF attack that killed four, prompted many civilians in El Rahad to flee. By mid-June, twenty civilians had been killed in the renewed attacks.

Clashes died down in both El Obeid and El Rahad by June 19, and two days later, electricity was restored to El Obeid after an agreement was reached between pro-Army tribes and the RSF. Trade and outside goods also resumed, and local groups began restoring water stations and communication lines. However, Greater Kordofan officials claimed that bilateral talks between the regional administration, Sudanese Army, and the RSF were paused. By late June, the RSF had established roadblocks on all roads leading out of El Obeid, and controlled most of the outer edges of the city. Ahmed Ali, the leader of the El Obeid Resistance Committee, claimed that despite the SAF's presence at the international airport and the army headquarters in the city, they were not aiding civilians suffering from the growing lack of food, water, and other necessities. Due to the lack of water and other necessities, the state's infrastructure began to crumble. Prisoners in the El Obeid prison were released, and markets and warehouses were ransacked by discontented civilians. On July 3, a clash broke out west of El Obeid between a Joint Darfur Force convoy heading to El Fasher from White Nile to deliver fuel to the former. Another clash between the RSF and the SAF on July 5 killed a child and injured four others.

In the first week of July, the city received an influx of refugees from Bara, with refugees claiming the RSF was "terrorizing" the town after recently capturing it. Residents from the village of Farajallah also claimed similar experiences with the RSF following their capture of the town. Fighting broke out again on July 8, between the SAF and the RSF across El Obeid. During the battle, power to the western part of the city was cut off, and an aid convoy was seized by the RSF on July 11. The SAF launched airstrikes on RSF bases in southern and western El Obeid on July 20, and many civilian homes were destroyed in the process. Residents stated that at least four people were killed and 45 injured in the clashes, and the el-Safaa and el-Wehda neighborhoods faced the brunt of the damage. The El Obeid Grand Market was also forced to close temporarily by SAF soldiers. On 26 July, the SAF announced that it had retaken the Al Sadarat highway, restoring a direct supply corridor between Khartoum and El Obeid. It also recaptured Bara, Umm Sayala and Jabra al Sheikh during the offensive.

In early August, much of the city returned to normal. The markets in the city reopened and no fighting was reported, however residents stated that the SAF would "[be] physically violent" against civilians when closing markets in the evening. In clashes on August 12, the SAF reported they killed 26 RSF militants in the town of Farajallah. On August 14, 2023, video emerged of SAF soldiers of the 5th division celebrating the 69th anniversary of the founding of the Sudanese Armed Forces, with commander Major General Faisal Alhassan in different parts of the city.

In late August, fierce fighting in El-Obeid killed at least 14 civilians and wounded 17 others. A witness said that the army had chased the RSF from El-Obeid and that electricity and market activity had resumed, although activists later reported that the army had closed the Grand Market again because of tensions in the city.

=== Continued siege until SAF victory ===
On 17 September, the army said it had repelled an RSF attack on the eastern edge of El Obeid, causing heavy casualties and equipment losses. The following day, Radio Dabanga reported that RSF forces attacked the city from the west and were confronted by the army. On October 8, 2023, renewed clashes in El Obeid killed at least four people and injured 17 others. Sudan Tribune reported that RSF fighters had entered the Elias neighbourhood from the northwest, after which the army confronted them. The army later bombarded RSF positions in the Ghar Mountains, while RSF counter-bombardment hit populated neighbourhoods, damaging homes and causing civilian casualties. The report said that the RSF had besieged El Obeid since the early days of the war, worsening shortages of food, medicine and other essential goods. By late 2023, El Obeid remained under SAF control but was isolated, with the RSF dominating rural areas and highways around the city.

On April 15, 2024, five civilians were killed and ten others injured in crossfire between the Sudanese Armed Forces and Rapid Support Forces in the city. Six days later, the RSF launched another attack on El Obeid, which was repelled by the Sudanese army. The siege nevertheless intensified, and by June 30 residents were facing severe shortages of water, food and fuel. Those who could afford to leave fled the city, while poorer residents remained trapped. A June 2024 International Crisis Group report identified El Obeid as one of the major towns besieged by the RSF, and said that the blockade of food and supplies by Sudan's warring parties could contribute to famine conditions.

On January 3, the RSF carried out drone strikes on El Obeid, with a drone hitting a power station and leaving the city without electricity. On January 30, 2025, the Sudanese army shot down ten RSF drones over the town.

On February 23, 2025, the Sudanese army said it had broken the near two-year RSF siege of El Obeid. Army troops arriving from White Nile state met forces already inside El Obeid, and residents celebrated the end of the siege. A military spokesman said army forces had destroyed RSF units, while Finance Minister Gibril Ibrahim said the advance would help open access for humanitarian aid to Kordofan.

=== Renewed attacks and partial encirclement ===
The respite was short-lived. A July 2025 report described El Obeid as one of the cities in central Sudan most severely affected by the war, with the continuing RSF siege cutting trade routes, halting activity at the central market and disrupting supply networks. By July 2026, UN officials said civilians in and around El Obeid had been living under siege-like conditions for 18 months.

In March 2025, the RSF shelled El Obeid for six consecutive days, killing civilians, critically injuring others, and damaging homes and infrastructure. Two months later, a hospital was struck by a suspected RSF drone attack, killing six people and injuring at least twelve. The hospital was put out of operation by the attack. In November, the RSF intensified its operations around El Obeid. On 3 November, a reported drone strike on a funeral outside the city killed at least 40 people. Later that same month, the RSF attacked SAF positions west of El Obeid but was repelled. The following day, the Sudanese Armed Forces launched a counter-offensive, reportedly pushing RSF units back and taking high ground near Abu Sunun. The RSF nevertheless continued attempts to sever supply routes to the city.

During the summer of 2026, RSF forces and allied groups were reported to be encircling El Obeid. The RSF had increasingly restricted access to the city, reinforced its positions around it, and launched artillery and drone attacks, raising fears of a wider assault and possible mass atrocities. ACLED assessed that the fighting around El Obeid had become a strategic stalemate: the RSF held positions to the north, west and south of the city, while the SAF retained a supply route to the east. ACLED said neither side had the decisive advantage needed for a breakthrough.

In June 2026, ACLED recorded 27 drone-strike events around El Obeid, the highest monthly total since the start of the conflict. Strikes hit markets, schools, fuel stations, water infrastructure and vehicles, killing and injuring civilians. Residents struggled with hunger, lack of clean water, and fear. The second quarter of 2026 was also marked by reports of summary executions, abductions, torture and conflict-related sexual violence.

According to the UNHRC, people fleeing the violence in the larger El Obeid area faced executions, abductions, torture and abuse, sexual violence, and robbery along displacement routes. Furthermore, many people in El Obeid could not afford to flee the city due to high transport costs and strikes on vehicles on the roads out of the city. Attacks on petrol stations had driven up prices.

Amid fears that a massacre like the one in El-Fasher could be repeated, the UN Security Council adopted a statement on June 20, 2026, expressing alarm over substantial RSF reinforcements around El Obeid and warning of the risk of a ground offensive. The council said that more than 500,000 people were in danger, warned of the “imminent risk of mass atrocities”, and demanded that the RSF immediately halt its attack on El Obeid. On June 23, seven European countries also called on the RSF in a joint statement to immediately halt its attack on the city, saying there were credible indications that an offensive could happen soon.

=== SAF counteroffensive in North Kordofan ===
On 6 September 2026, the SAF recaptured Hamrat al-Wiz in North Kordofan. The advance, together with reported SAF drone strikes on RSF positions and convoys in western North Kordofan, complicated RSF efforts to fully encircle El Obeid.
