= Karkaraya =

Town in Sudan

Karkaraya كركارية
- Location in Sudan
- Coordinates: 11°17′20″N 29°54′41″E
- Country: Sudan; De facto: New Sudan
- State: South Kordofan
- Time zone: Central Africa Time, GMT + 3

Karkaraya (Arabic: كركارية), or Karkaria, is a town in South Kordofan, Sudan, that is 30 kilometres (19 mi) from Kadugli, the state capital.

== Conflicts ==
It has been a site of conflict in recent years, especially during the War in Darfur and the ongoing Sudan war, which started on 15 April 2023.

In August 2022, Karkaraya was attacked by armed groups, resulting in livestock theft, the capture of nine locals and one fatality. The National Umma Party was urging for state intervention and cooperation from the Sudan People's Liberation Movement for the release of captives and return of the stolen livestock. The government was held responsible for any fallout from this situation.

In July 2023, the Sudan People's Liberation Movement–North led by Abdelaziz al-Hilu (SPLM-N El Hilu) took control of the Karkaraya crude oil pumping station, which is located 12 kilometres (7.5 mi) south of Delling. This happened after the Sudanese Armed Forces battalion present at the station withdrew. The SPLM-N El Hilu force stationed at the Karkaraya station notified the workers to return and practice their work normally.

== Health issues ==
In 2008, in Karkaraya, the local community faced health issues due to contaminated water. The villagers were sharing an unprotected haffir (a traditional Sudanese water pond) with livestock, leading to a high risk of contamination. A Village Health Worker (VHW) from Karkaraya brought this issue to the attention of Medair's Water and Sanitation (WatSan) staff in Kadugli.

Medair proposed the use of household bio-sand filters, which had been successfully implemented in other Southern Kordofan villages. The village leaders were enthusiastic about this plan and agreed to arrange for community members to be trained in filter-construction by Medair. After an initial hiccup where no one showed up for the training, a week later, all the people were ready to be trained. By mid-April, Medair had arranged a four-day training for five filter-makers, who then started constructing the filters.
