= Kuek, South Kordofan =

Village in Sudan

- Village
- Country: Sudan
- State: South Kordofan
- Time zone: UTC+2 (CAT)

Kuek is a village in South Kordofan, Sudan.

== History ==
On 15 April, 2012 Kuek was captured by SAF soldiers during the Heglig Crisis. On 11 April 2024, nine civilians were reportedly killed by SAF intelligence services after being accused of collaborating with rebels in Kuek. They clashed with the Sudan People's Liberation Movement–North.
