= Dilling Airport =

Airport in Sudan

- IATA: none; ICAO: HSDL

Summary
- Airport type: Public
- Serves: Dilling
- Elevation AMSL: 2,206 ft (672 m)
- Coordinates: 11°59′30″N 29°40′25″E

Map
- Location of the airport in Sudan

Runways
Direction	Length		Surface
Direction	m	ft	Surface
18/36	1,925	6,316	Dirt
- Google Maps GCM

Dilling Airport (ICAO: HSDL) is an airport serving Dilling (Dalang) in Sudan. The airport is 6 kilometres (3.7 mi) southeast of the city.

== See also ==
- Transport in Sudan
- List of airports in Sudan
