= Abu Qawad =

Town in Sudan

Abu Qawad is a town near El-Obeid in North Kordofan, Sudan.

== History ==
Abu Qawad was scene to intense clashes during the Sudanese civil war. On 22 August 2025, the Sudanese Armed Forces (SAF) claimed to have destroyed 130 Rapid Support Forces (RSF) combat vehicles and captured 92 others following clashes in Abu Qawad.
