= Abu Zabad =

Locality in West Kordofan State, Sudan

Abu Zabad أبو زبد
- Location within Sudan
- Coordinates: 12°21′20″N 29°14′4″E
- Country: Sudan
- State: West Kordofan

Government
  - Type: locality

Population (2015)
  - Total: 15,304
- Time zone: UTC+2 (CAT)

Abu Zabad (Arabic: أبو زبد) is a locality in West Kordofan, Sudan.

== History ==
On 7 June 2025, eight people were killed in an SAF drone attack on a school sheltering refugees in Abu Zabad.
