= Babanusa =

Babanusa بابنوسة
- Town
- Location in Sudan
- Coordinates: 11°20′N 27°48′E
- Country: Sudan
- State: West Kordofan
- Elevation: 373 m (1,224 ft)

Population (2008)
  - Total: 32,759

Babanusa (Arabic: بابنوسة) is a town in West Kordofan, Sudan.

== History ==
In 1965, 72 Dinka civilians were massacred in the town by an Arab mob during the First Sudanese Civil War.

In January 2024, the Siege of Babanusa began. The intense battle lasted until February where the siege was lifted by the Sudanese army. On 11 November 2025, the RSF launched a second attack on the city and claimed full control on 1 December.

== Geography ==
=== Climate ===
Babanusa has a semi-arid climate (Köppen climate classification BSh).

Climate data for Babanusa (1991–2020)
| Month | Jan | Feb | Mar | Apr | May | Jun | Jul | Aug | Sep | Oct | Nov | Dec | Year |
|---|---|---|---|---|---|---|---|---|---|---|---|---|---|
| Record high °C (°F) | 42.7 (108.9) | 44.6 (112.3) | 47.0 (116.6) | 45.4 (113.7) | 46.0 (114.8) | 43.4 (110.1) | 39.7 (103.5) | 38.5 (101.3) | 40.0 (104.0) | 40.2 (104.4) | 41.0 (105.8) | 40.5 (104.9) | 47.0 (116.6) |
| Mean daily maximum °C (°F) | 33.2 (91.8) | 35.8 (96.4) | 38.8 (101.8) | 40.9 (105.6) | 39.6 (103.3) | 36.3 (97.3) | 33.1 (91.6) | 32.1 (89.8) | 33.7 (92.7) | 36.1 (97.0) | 36.0 (96.8) | 33.6 (92.5) | 35.8 (96.4) |
| Daily mean °C (°F) | 25.4 (77.7) | 27.8 (82.0) | 31.0 (87.8) | 33.4 (92.1) | 33.1 (91.6) | 30.8 (87.4) | 28.5 (83.3) | 27.6 (81.7) | 28.4 (83.1) | 29.9 (85.8) | 28.7 (83.7) | 26.0 (78.8) | 29.2 (84.6) |
| Mean daily minimum °C (°F) | 17.7 (63.9) | 19.7 (67.5) | 23.2 (73.8) | 25.9 (78.6) | 26.6 (79.9) | 25.2 (77.4) | 23.8 (74.8) | 23.0 (73.4) | 23.2 (73.8) | 23.6 (74.5) | 21.5 (70.7) | 18.5 (65.3) | 22.7 (72.9) |
| Record low °C (°F) | 4.4 (39.9) | 7.2 (45.0) | 8.2 (46.8) | 14.0 (57.2) | 17.2 (63.0) | 14.6 (58.3) | 16.8 (62.2) | 16.9 (62.4) | 15.5 (59.9) | 16.9 (62.4) | 14.2 (57.6) | 9.5 (49.1) | 7.7 (45.9) |
| Average precipitation mm (inches) | 0.0 (0.0) | 0.0 (0.0) | 0.7 (0.03) | 4.9 (0.19) | 25.4 (1.00) | 71.7 (2.82) | 113.9 (4.48) | 139.4 (5.49) | 90.1 (3.55) | 30.7 (1.21) | 1.0 (0.04) | 0.0 (0.0) | 477.9 (18.81) |
| Average precipitation days (≥ 1 mm) | 0.0 | 0.0 | 0.2 | 0.5 | 3.0 | 5.2 | 7.4 | 9.5 | 7.3 | 2.9 | 0.2 | 0.0 | 36.2 |
| Average relative humidity (%) | 20 | 15 | 14 | 19 | 35 | 50 | 64 | 68 | 64 | 42 | 24 | 23 | 36 |
| Mean monthly sunshine hours | 306.9 | 277.2 | 275.9 | 264.0 | 272.8 | 222.0 | 192.2 | 186.0 | 216.0 | 257.3 | 303.0 | 310.0 | 3,083.3 |
| Percentage possible sunshine | 89 | 87 | 75 | 75 | 71 | 62 | 51 | 51 | 61 | 73 | 89 | 90 | 73 |
Source: NOAA (percent sun, 1961-1990)

== Transport ==
It is a railway junction on the national railway network where the line to Waw in South Sudan branches off to the south from the line westwards to Nyala.

== See also ==
- Railway stations in Sudan
