= Hamrat El Sheikh =

Town in Sudan

- Town
- Location within Sudan
- Coordinates: 14°38′15″N 27°58′25″E
- Country: Sudan
- State: North Kordofan
- Time zone: UTC+2 (CAT)

Hamrat El Sheikh or Hamrat al-Sheikh is a town in North Kordofan, Sudan.

== History ==
In October 2024, 30 people were killed and more than a hundred were injured in an airstrike.

On 4 December 2025, a World Food Programme (WFP) convoy was attacked in Hamrat El Sheikh, damaging a truck and injuring its driver.
