= Siege of Babanusa =

2024 military siege of Babanusa, Sudan

- Part of the Sudanese civil war (2023–present) and the Kordofan Campaign
Date	Initial assault: 22 January – 5 February 2024 (2 weeks); Siege: 22 January 2024 – 1 December 2025 (1 year, 10 months, 1 week and 2 days)
Location	Babanusa, West Kordofan, Sudan
Result	RSF victory: RSF takes full control over the city.

Belligerents
Sudanese government; Sudanese Armed Forces	(Sudan) Government of Peace and Unity (from April 2025); Rapid Support Forces

Commanders and leaders
Abdullah Muhammad al-Dagal †; Ibrahim al-Tom Jali †	Abdel Rahim Daglo; Hamid Fadlallah †; Ibrahim al-Sharif †; Abdul-Rahman Difallah †

Casualties and losses
Unknown	13 vehicles destroyed
- 100 killed 64,000 displaced

The siege of Babanusa was a siege of the Sudanese civil war. The siege started when fighting erupted between the Rapid Support Forces (RSF) and the Sudanese Armed Forces (SAF) on 22 January 2024 near Babanusa. On 1 December 2025, RSF took control of the city after a prolonged siege.

== Prelude ==
On 13 January 2024, the Sudanese Armed Forces launched airstrikes on the nearby city of El Tibbun. In retaliation, the Rapid Support Forces mobilized significant forces in various directions around Babanusa, including in El Tibbun, Samoaa in the southwest, and Muglad in the south.

== Siege ==
On 22 January 2024, the RSF launched an offensive with the aim of seizing control of the 22nd Infantry Division headquarters in Babanusa, West Kordofan. The initial assault was successful for the RSF, capturing several police stations and also releasing videos of RSF soldiers inside of the 22nd Infantry Divisions headquarters, signaling its capture. Later counterattack attempts from the SAF succeeded and RSF forces were pushed out of the headquarters.

A two-day ceasefire was held on 28 January by the Misseriya native administration to allow civilians to escape the conflict, however the fighting continued despite the ceasefire attempts.

In an audio recording on 11 February, the head of the RSF, Hemedti, claimed victory in Babanusa and Omdurman. The Sudanese Army responded within a few hours denying this claim and accused Hemedti of "misinformation." The statement further claimed that the RSF suffered "heavy losses" in recent clashes with the army. The Sudanese Army released videos showing their troops in control of the Mohandiseen area and asserted that its forces controlled the Babanusa garrison.

On 6 May, shelling in the city killed 2 SAF commanders and 3 RSF commanders, on the SAF side, Abdullah Muhammad al-Dagal and Ibrahim al-Tom Jail were killed, while on the RSF side, Hamid Fadlallah, Ibrahim al-Sharif, and Abdul-Rahman Difallah were killed in the shelling.

=== 2025 ===
A year later in June after no conflict, SAF launched airstrikes on the city and repelled another failed RSF invasion in the city. The airstrike destroyed 13 RSF combat vehicles while the RSF attack was from several directions and RSF withdrew after suffering many casualties. The RSF claimed that they were able to capture the headquarters but were forced to retreat again by the SAF. An RSF member recorded attacking the defenses until a landmine exploded and injured many of the surrounding soldiers.

On 1 December, the RSF captured the 22nd Infantry Division headquarters and claimed full control over the city. The next day, it was reported that the commander of the 22nd Infantry Division, Major-General Abdelmajid al-Haj, and an unidentified brigadier general who commanded the SAF's 170th Artillery Brigade were killed in an RSF ambush while retreating from Babanusa towards Heglig.

== Humanitarian impact ==
50 civilians died and significant property damage occurred due to the siege as of January 2024. Total casualties were reportedly 100 people.

The siege escalated an already dire humanitarian crisis in Sudan, displacing another 45,000 people.
