= Um Dehilib =

Locality in South Kordofan State, Sudan

- Country: Sudan
- State: South Kordofan

Government
  - Type: town
- Time zone: UTC+2 (CAT)

Um Dehilib is a town in South Kordofan, Sudan.

== History ==
In the Sudan war, the Rapid Support Forces took the town on 7 June 2025. Local media reported that the RSF joined forces with the Sudan People's Liberation Movement-North (SPLM-N) to capture the town.
