= Er Rahad =

Er Rahad ٱلـرَّهَـد Abu-Dokkanah
- Town
- Location in Sudan
- Coordinates: 12°43′N 30°39′E
- Country: Sudan
- State: North Kurdufan
- Time zone: UTC+02:00 (CAT)

Er-Rahad (Arabic: ٱلـرَّهَـد, "The Water-shrine") is a city located in the state of North Kordofan, Sudan, at an altitude of 490 metres (1,610 feet) above sea level. It is about 379 kilometres (235 miles) away from the capital, Khartoum. It is a major railway station linking East and Central Sudan and the West, which is also a market for crops, especially hibiscus as well as livestock and also urban centers for nomadic shepherds in the region. It is the second largest local resource in North Kordofan after the Shikan locality.

== History ==
The region was inhabited by the indigenous brown-skinned Nubians during the kingdoms of Alwa and Makuria in medieval times. The region had a resistance movement against the Turkish-Egyptian rule during the Mahdia revolution led by Sheikh Mana Ismail Abu al-Batul, one of the leaders of the Juma'a tribe, who occupied the center of the titans before moving to the city of Bara and defeating its military protection and occupation and cutting supply routes from Khartoum to Kordofan. White City by the Mahdi in 1883. Al-Rahad also received some supporters of the revolution and its Mujahideen, where Sharif Yusuf al-Hindi, who was martyred in the battle of Sheikan before the fall of the El-Obeid. Today there is a shrine in the city of Al-Rahad

== Geography ==
The city of Al-Rahd is located between long lines 30,18 and 31.21 and latitudes 12.45 and 13.42 in the southern part of North Kordofan state. It is bordered to the south by South Kordofan State, to the east and north by Umm Rawaba and to the west by Shikan. There is a river called Rahad.

=== Climate ===
Al-Rahad has a tropical climate characterized by warm summers and mild winters, with a peak temperature from April to June, averaging 36 °C (97 °F), while the temperature drops significantly in November and December to record 15 and 19 °C (59 and 66 °F), respectively. Rain falls in the summer, with the highest in June, 134 mm (5.3 in) on average, July 128 mm (5.0 in) in August and an average of 67 mm (2.6 in)

== Notable people ==
Hawa Al-Tagtaga

== See also ==
- Northeast Africa
