= Kalogi =

Village in Sudan

Coordinates: 10°51′30″N 30°59′00″E

- Town
- Location within Sudan
- Country: Sudan
- State: South Kordofan
- Time zone: UTC+2 (CAT)

Kalogi is a town in South Kordofan, Sudan.

== History ==
On 4 December 2025, at least 116 people, including 43 children, were killed in a drone strike blamed on the Rapid Support Forces (RSF) in Kalogi. The strike reportedly hit a kindergarten. The nearby Kalogi Rural Hospital was also damaged.
