= Dilling, South Kordofan =

Dilling الدلنج Dalang, Dalanj
- Town
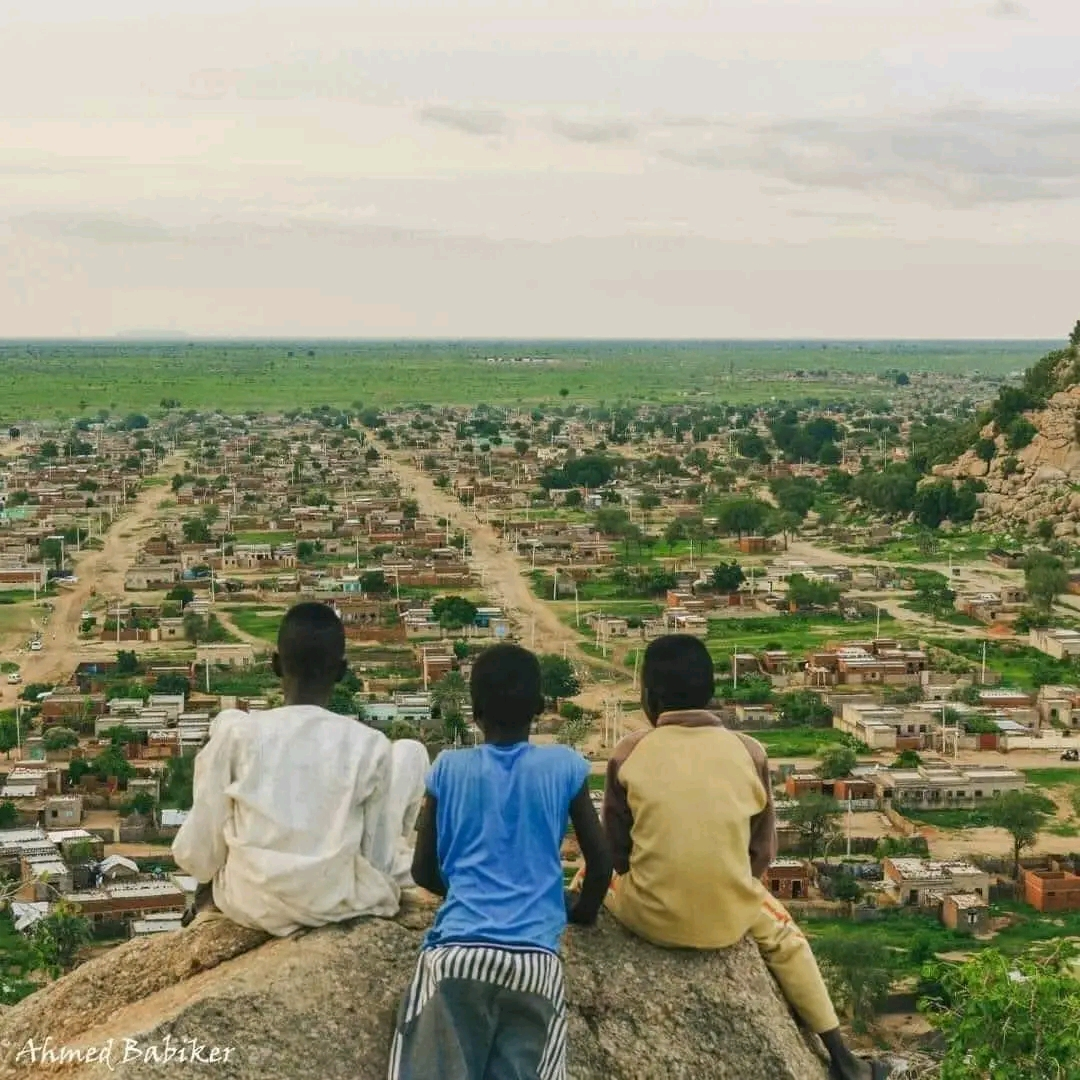

- Location in Sudan
- Coordinates: 12°03′09″N 29°39′20″E
- Country: Sudan
- State: South Kurdufan
- Elevation: 2,249 ft (685 m)

Population (2008)
  - Total: 59,089
- Time zone: UTC+02:00 (CAT)

Dilling (Arabic: الدلنج, romanized: al-Dalanj) or Dalang is a town in South Kordofan State in Sudan, north of the state capital Kadugli. As of 2008 it had a population 59,089 people. In printed sources and internet sources, including maps and atlases, the town's name is usually spelled as Dilling, reflecting the local pronunciation [ˈdɪlɪŋ]. The spellings Dalang and Dalanj reflect a pronunciation adapted to the phonotactics of Arabic.

== Geography ==
Dilling is located about 160 kilometres (99 mi) south of El Obeid, the state capital of North Kordofan State. The town has a lake in the northeastern part of the same name. An asphalted road links Dilling to Khartoum via Kosti and El Obeid, and another all-season road links Dilling to Kadugli. There is a railway station in the north of the town on a branch line to Debeibat. Dilling Airport is to the southeast of the town.

== Demography ==
The town is inhabited mainly by Nuba (especially the Ajang such as the Dilling tribe, the Gulfan tribe, the Kodor tribe, the Dabatnah tribe, the Kortalah tribe, the Kadro tribe, the Nyimang), the Fellata, the Hawazma Arabs, the Birged tribe, and many other tribes from north and middle Sudan. The Nuba group from whom the town takes its name, the Dilling, now constitute the majority of the population.

== War in Sudan (2023) ==
The city was captured and is occupied by The Sudan People's Liberation Movement–North (al-Hilu faction) during the War in Sudan (2023). The town was later recaptured by the Sudanese army. In February 2025, the SAF pushed back the SPLM-N from the south of the city, opening up the road to Kadugli. On the 27th of January, 2026, the SAF managed to break the siege of Dilling, thus ending a year and a half siege.

== Economy ==
The main economic activity is trade. Other citizens work for the government, are engaged in agriculture or cattle breeding, or work on leather or metal work crafts. Dilling is the home of Dilling University.

== Notable residents ==
- Abdel Gadir Salim
- Shams al-Din Kabbashi
