= Kadugli =

Kadugli كادوقلي Kaduqli
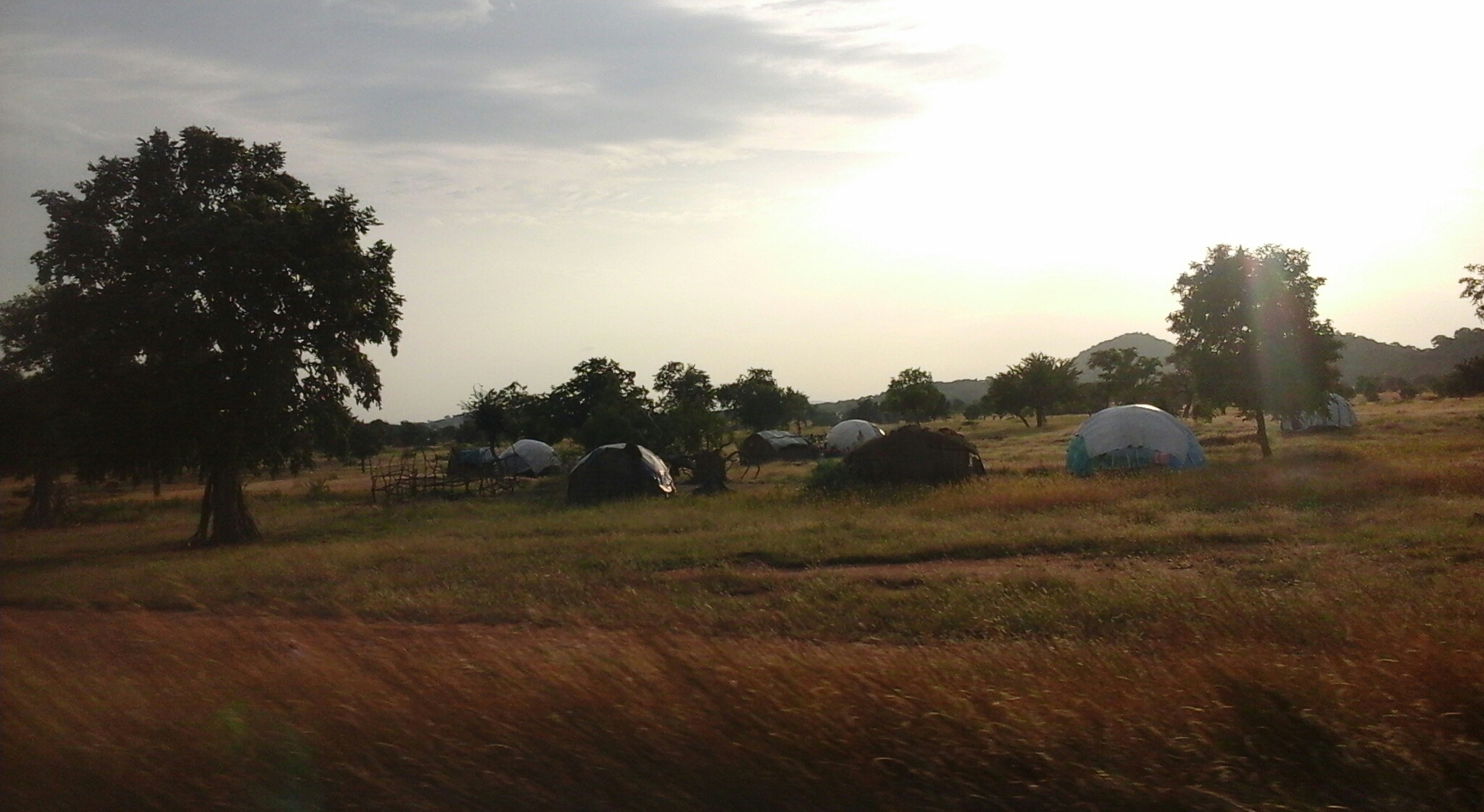

- Location in Sudan
- Coordinates: 11°1′0″N 29°43′0″E
- Country: Sudan
- State: South Kordofan

Population (2005)
  - Total: 92,674 (est)

Kaduqli or Kadugli (Arabic: كادوقلي Kādūqlī) is the capital city of South Kordofan State, Sudan. It is located 240 kilometres (150 mi) south of El-Obeid, at the northern edge of the White Nile plain in the Nuba Mountains. It contains Hilal Stadium.

== History ==
The Battle of Kadugli broke out during the 2023 Sudan conflict. The 2025 Kadugli shelling took place in February 2025.

== Economy ==
It is a trading centre for gum arabic and livestock. Industries include textiles, soap factories, and the production of leather.

During the United Nations Mission in Sudan (UNMIS), Kaduqli was the Sector IV Headquarters. It housed the Egyptian contingent and based the Indian Aviation contingent's MI-17 helicopters.

== Climate ==
Kaduqli has a hot semi-arid climate (Köppen climate classification BSh), rainfall being just under the boundary for a tropical savanna climate (Koppen: Aw), characterized by consistently hot temperatures and distinct wet and dry seasons. March to May marks the hottest part of the year. The wet season lasts from May to September, with moderately high levels of rainfall and humidity. The dry season lasts from November to April, and conversely has very low humidity and almost no rainfall.

Climate data for Kadugli (1991–2020 normals, 1961–2020 extremes)
Month	Jan	Feb	Mar	Apr	May	Jun	Jul	Aug	Sep	Oct	Nov	Dec	Year
Record high °C (°F)	42.5 (108.5)	44.5 (112.1)	44.3 (111.7)	47 (117)	44.2 (111.6)	41.6 (106.9)	40.7 (105.3)	38 (100)	39.3 (102.7)	41.3 (106.3)	41.5 (106.7)	40.9 (105.6)	47 (117)
Mean daily maximum °C (°F)	34.6 (94.3)	36.9 (98.4)	39.4 (102.9)	40.4 (104.7)	38.2 (100.8)	34.6 (94.3)	32.1 (89.8)	31.2 (88.2)	32.7 (90.9)	35.1 (95.2)	36.7 (98.1)	35.2 (95.4)	35.6 (96.1)
Daily mean °C (°F)	26.0 (78.8)	28.3 (82.9)	31.0 (87.8)	32.4 (90.3)	31.2 (88.2)	28.6 (83.5)	27.0 (80.6)	26.2 (79.2)	26.8 (80.2)	27.8 (82.0)	28.2 (82.8)	26.8 (80.2)	28.4 (83.1)
Mean daily minimum °C (°F)	17.4 (63.3)	19.6 (67.3)	22.6 (72.7)	24.4 (75.9)	24.1 (75.4)	22.6 (72.7)	22.0 (71.6)	21.3 (70.3)	21.0 (69.8)	20.5 (68.9)	19.6 (67.3)	18.4 (65.1)	21.1 (70.0)
Record low °C (°F)	5 (41)	8.5 (47.3)	13 (55)	14.8 (58.6)	15 (59)	15.5 (59.9)	15.3 (59.5)	16.2 (61.2)	16.3 (61.3)	9.7 (49.5)	11.6 (52.9)	10 (50)	5 (41)
Average precipitation mm (inches)	0.2 (0.01)	0.0 (0.0)	1.1 (0.04)	8.9 (0.35)	69.4 (2.73)	114.9 (4.52)	132.0 (5.20)	165.1 (6.50)	136.8 (5.39)	80.8 (3.18)	0.4 (0.02)	0.0 (0.0)	709.5 (27.93)
Average precipitation days (≥ 1.0 mm)	0.1	0.0	0.2	1.2	5.8	8.4	9.7	11.2	10.3	6.5	0.1	0.0	53.4
Average relative humidity (%)	19	15	15	23	40	57	68	73	71	58	30	24	41
Mean monthly sunshine hours	282.1	249.2	248.0	231.0	235.6	189.0	158.1	158.1	183.0	217.0	288.0	297.6	2,736.7
Source: NOAA
