= Timeline of the Sudanese civil war (2026) =

The following is a timeline of the Sudanese civil war in 2026.

== January ==
=== 1 January ===
Hamid Ali Abubakar, the commander-in-chief of the RSF-aligned faction of the Sudanese Awakening Revolutionary Council (RAC) and concurrent security adviser to Hemedti, was killed in a drone strike on a meeting of RSF and allied commanders in Damrat al-Firdous, Central Darfur.

=== 3 January ===
The RSF carried out drone strikes on El-Obeid and White Nile State. An airstrike against a power station in El-Obeid left the city without electricity.

Up to 64 civilians were killed in SAF airstrikes on Hemedti's hometown of Al Zorg that destroyed the town's hospital, and also killed two of Hemedti's relatives and local tribal leader Bashir Barma Baraka Allah.

The RSF and allied groups claimed to have taken El Bardab, north of Kadugli.

=== 4 January ===
The Sudan Liberation Movement-Abdel Wahid (SLM-AW), a neutral rebel group, ordered the replacement of Sudanese state symbols with its own in the Liberated Areas in Central and North Darfur.

=== 5 January ===
The SAF claimed to have intercepted a drone attack by the RSF on Merowe.

Thirteen people, including eight children, were killed in an RSF drone strike on a house in El-Obeid, according to the Sudan Doctors' Network.

=== 7 January ===
One soldier was killed in a suspected RSF drone strike on a Sudan Shield Forces (SSF) camp in the Butana plains in Gezira State.

=== 9 January ===
The RSF and its allies, the Sudan Liberation Forces Gathering and the Justice and Equality Movement (JEM), attacked positions of the Darfur Joint Protection Force (JDF) at the Chad–Sudan border.

The SAF carried out airstrikes on RSF positions in Darfur and Kordofan. The SAF claimed 240 military vehicles were wrecked and hundreds of RSF members were killed. The SAF also claimed a Turkish Baykar Bayraktar Akıncı drone operated by the RSF was shot down over Nyala Airport. In South Kordofan, the SPLM-N (al-Hilu) said 13 civilians, including children, were killed in an airstrike on Um Jamina in Al-Sunut County.

=== 10 January ===
The JDF accused the RSF of killing and kidnapping 19 people in Jirjira, North Darfur.

=== 11 January ===
The SAF-aligned government announced its complete return to Khartoum, having operated in Port Sudan as the temporary capital since 2023.

The SAF conducted strikes against a supply convoy in Yabus, Blue Nile State, near the Ethiopia–Sudan border.

Five people were killed and 20 injured in an RSF drone strike on a market in Kartala, South Kordofan.

=== 12 January ===
At least 27 people were killed and 73 others were wounded by an RSF drone strike on an army base in Singa. The attack reportedly targeted a meeting between government and SAF officials at the base. The governors of White Nile, Sennar, and Blue Nile States were confirmed to have been in attendance, but survived the attack.

=== 13 January ===
The SAF and allied groups claimed to have retaken Jirjira from the RSF.

=== 14 January ===
The SAF repelled an attack by the RSF and SPLM-N (al-Hilu) near Al-Kuwaik, close to Kadugli.

The RSF was accused of abducting 97 young men from a gold mine in Eyal Bakhit, West Kordofan.

=== 15 January ===
The RSF carried out a cross-border attack into Chad while pursuing a JDF unit that fled into the country, killing seven Chadian soldiers at the Birak garrison near Tiné Djagaraba.

Twelve people were killed in an RSF drone strike on a market in Dalang, South Kordofan.

The SPLM-N (al-Hilu) and the RSF claimed to have repelled an SAF attack on Habila, 30 km (19 mi) from Dalang.

=== 18 January ===
The SAF repelled a large scale RSF attack on Wadi al-Hout in North Kordofan.

=== 20 January ===
The Central Bank of Sudan announced the resumption of its operations in Khartoum for the first time since the civil war began.

=== 21 January ===
The RSF detained 17 Zaghawas from Mahajeriya in East Darfur, including the head of the rural court.

=== 23 January ===
Five people were killed in an SAF drone strike on a market in Abu Zaima, North Kordofan.

=== 24 January ===
Two people were killed in an RSF drone strike on Dalang. The RSF claimed to have shot down an SAF Bayraktar drone over the city.

=== 25 January ===
The SAF repelled a large-scale attack by the RSF and SPLM-N (al-Hilu) from South Sudan on Milkan and Al-Silak in Blue Nile State.

=== 26 January ===
The SAF retook Habila and broke the siege of Dalang.

=== 27 January ===
Five people were killed in a drone strike on Dalang.

=== 28 January ===
Dozens of people were killed in an RSF drone strike on Dalang.

=== 30 January ===
The European Union imposed sanctions on seven individuals for their role in escalating the conflict in Sudan, including Hemedti's brother Major Algoney Hamdan Dagalo Musa, and Al-Misbah Abu Zaid Talha, commander of the SAF-allied Al-Bara' ibn Malik Battalion.

The RSF carried out a drone attack on El-Obeid.

== February ==
=== 1 February ===
A joint SAF-JDF force retook Al-Dashol, on the highway between Dalang and Kadugli.

At least five people, including a senior RSF commander and a tribal leader, were killed in clashes with rival RSF factions in Khazan Jadid, East Darfur.

=== 3 February ===
The SAF said it had broken the RSF siege of Kadugli. Later that day, RSF drone strikes on the city killed 15 people.

The RSF and SPLM-N (al-Hilu) seized the towns of Deim Mansour, Bashir Nuqu and Khor al-Budi near Kurmuk in Blue Nile state.

=== 4 February ===
One person was killed in an RSF drone strike on a military hospital in Kadugli.

=== 5 February ===
The United Kingdom imposed sanctions on six individuals over their role in sustaining the conflict, including three Colombians accused of recruiting mercenaries for the RSF, RSF field commander Hussein Barsham, and Sudan Shield Forces commander Abu Aqla Kikal.

Twenty-two people were killed in an RSF drone strike on a military hospital in Kouik, South Kordofan. An SAF drone strike on a market in West Kordofan injured 11 people.

=== 6 February ===
At least one person was killed in a series of RSF drone strikes on truck convoys in North Kordofan.

=== 7 February ===
A RSF drone attack on a vehicle carrying displaced families near Er Rahad killed at least 24 people including eight children.

The SAF repelled an RSF attack on Al-Silak.

=== 8 February ===
Three people were killed in an RSF drone strike on a vehicle carrying food supplies near Umm Ruwaba in North Kordofan.

=== 10 February ===
The SAF said it destroyed a FK-2000 air defense system and drones used by the RSF in Ed Dubeibat.

=== 11 February ===
Two people were killed in an RSF drone strike on a mosque in Er Rahad.

=== 13 February ===
Two people were killed in RSF drone strikes on al-Kurgal, South Kordofan.

The SAF shelled the RSF and SPLM-N (Toka)-held towns of Malkon and Yabus, near the Ethiopian border in Blue Nile state.

=== 14 February ===
An unspecified number of civilian casualties occurred following drone strikes by the RSF and SPLM-N (Toka) in Qaysan, Blue Nile state.

=== 15 February ===
Three people were killed in an RSF drone strike on Al-Mazmoum Hospital in Sennar State.

At least 28 people were killed in a drone strike on a market outside Sodari in North Kordofan.

The SAF claimed to have destroyed an RSF air defence system in Abu Zabad, West Kordofan.

=== 16 February ===
At least 26 people were killed in a suspected SAF drone strike on a displacement shelter in El Sunut, West Kordofan.

=== 18 February ===
The World Food Programme delivered humanitarian aid to Dalang and Kadugli for the first time since 2024.

One person was killed in an RSF drone strike on Kurmuk.

=== 19 February ===
The United States imposed sanctions on RSF commanders Elfateh Abdullah Idris Adam, Gedo Hamdan Ahmed and Tijani Ibrahim Moussa Mohamed for their actions at El Fasher. The three were added to the Specially Designated Nationals and Blocked Persons List.

Three aid workers were killed in an RSF drone attack on a humanitarian aid convoy in Katala as it was travelling to Dalang and Kadugli.

=== 21 February ===
The RSF claimed to have taken Tina, along the border with Chad and North Darfur. The JDF denied the claim.

=== 22 February ===
RAC leader Musa Hilal, who was in conflict with the RSF, survived an RSF drone attack on his guest house in Mustariha, North Darfur. A separate attack on the town killed several RAC leaders and injured Hilal's son.

=== 23 February ===
The RSF attacked Mustariha, leaving 28 civilians dead.

Chad imposed an indefinite closure of its border with Sudan after RSF fighters entered the country while fleeing from SAF forces in Tina.

=== 24 February ===
The United Nations Security Council imposed sanctions on four RSF commanders, including Hemedti's brother Abdul Rahim Dagalo, Gedo Hamdan Ahmed, Elfateh Abdullah Idris Adam and Tijani Ibrahim Moussa Mohamed, for atrocities committed in El Fasher.

=== 25 February ===
The RAC announced Musa Hilal's arrival in SAF-controlled territory outside Darfur following the RSF attack on Mustariha.

=== 26 February ===
The RSF and SPLM-N carried out drone strikes on Geissan in Blue Nile state.

=== 28 February ===
Nine people were killed in RSF drone strikes on El-Obeid.

== March ==
=== 1 March ===
The RSF and SPLM-N claimed to have taken the SAF garrison at al-Taqma, 7 km (4.3 mi) east of Dalang, and cut the road linking Dalang and Habila.

=== 2 March ===
Twelve people were injured in an RSF drone strike on the British Hospital in El-Obeid.

=== 3 March ===
The RSF encirled Kadugli and cut the Dilling-Kadugli road, effectively restarting the Siege of Kadugli.

=== 4 March ===
Five people were killed by RSF and SPLM-N (al-Hilu) shelling in Dalang.

Eighteen people were killed in an SAF airstrike on Muglad.

=== 5 March ===
The SAF claimed to have retaken Bara in North Kordofan from the RSF. Shortly afterwards, the RSF looted and burned the nearby village of Umm Kuraidim, killing seven people.

The RSF claimed to have taken El Bardab, north of Kadugli.

Twenty-eight people were killed by RSF shelling in Dalang.

=== 7 March ===
At least 34 people were killed in SAF drone strikes on Abu Zabad.

=== 8 March ===
Six people were killed in an SAF drone strike on a fuel market in Ed Daein, while 10 others were killed in a similar attack in Nyala. The SPLM-N (al-Hilu) said 17 people were killed in a separate SAF attack on a market in Jald, South Kordofan.

=== 9 March ===
The United States included the Islamic Movement in Sudan and its armed wing, the Al-Bara' ibn Malik Battalion, to its list of Specially Designated Global Terrorists.

=== 10 March ===
At least 52 people were killed in a suspected SAF drone strike on a civilian convoy near Al-Fulah, West Kordofan.

Seven people were killed by RSF and SPLM-N (al-Hilu) shelling in Dalang.

=== 11 March ===
At least 17 people were killed in an RSF drone strike on a school in Shukeiri, White Nile State.

At least 20 people were killed in an SAF drone strike on Abu Zabad.

=== 12 March ===
At least 11 people were killed drone strike on Adikong market in West Darfur, near the Chadian town of Adré. Médecins Sans Frontières attributed the attack to the SAF.

The SAF claimed to have retaken Jort East and the Ballamo camp in Blue Nile state from the RSF and SPLM-N (Touka).

=== 13 March ===
Thirteen RSF militants, including a major general, were killed in an SAF drone strike on their convoy in Foro Baranga, West Darfur.

=== 15 March ===
Enagi Abdullah, a commander of the Islamist and pro-SAF paramilitary group Popular Resistance, was arrested after making remarks in support of Iran amid the 2026 Iran war that had been disavowed by the SAF-led government.

=== 16 March ===
The RSF retook Bara as well as Karnoi in North Darfur, near the border with Chad.

The RSF claimed to have taken Tina, which the JDF denied, adding that it had killed an RSF field commander during the attack. At least 17 people were reported killed in the fighting.

=== 17 March ===
The RSF burned a truck convoy transporting staple crops near En Nahud on its way to El-Obeid.

=== 18 March ===
The RSF was accused of killing 12 people in Shuraim Mima, north of Bara.

A drone that originated from Sudan hit the Chadian border town of Tinè, killing 17 people.

=== 19 March ===
The Chadian National Army carried out a security operation in Tinè following the drone attack the previous day, resulting in the seizure of weapons and the arrest of several Sudanese refugees accused being JDF members. Chad also closed its border with Sudan.

=== 20 March ===
Seventy people were killed and 146 injured in an SAF airstrike on the Ed Daein Hospital. The attack left over two million people without proper medical coverage according to the World Health Organization.

An RSF drone strike on Al Dabbah injured three people and hit a power station, causing blackouts.

=== 24 March ===
The RSF and SPLM-N (al-Hilu) took Kurmuk, near the Ethiopian border in Blue Nile State. The offensive displaced over 73,000 people.

=== 25 March ===
The RSF massacred 16 civilians in El Fasher.

A drone strike in RSF-controlled Saraf Omra, North Darfur killed 22 people and injured 17. Six people were killed and 10 injured in a suspected RSF strike on a civilian truck in North Kordofan.

=== 27 March ===
SAF drones struck RSF positions amassed near Tina in North Darfur.

Seven people were killed in an SAF airstrike on a funeral in Al-Sunut, South Kordofan.

=== 28 March ===
The SAF said it repelled an advance by the RSF and SPLM-N (al-Hilu) into the western and northern outskirts of Dalang.

=== 29 March ===
The SAF claimed to have repelled an RSF and SPLM-N attack on Al-Kaili in Blue Nile State, killing 94 fighters, capturing several others and destroying four combat vehicles.

At least 14 people were killed following two days of shelling by the RSF and SPLM-N (al-Hilu) on Dalang.

=== 30 March ===
A pediatrician in Nyala was killed in an assault on his home by an RSF officer who was accompanied by several personnel.

Osama Hassan, an official of the RSF-aligned Sudan Founding Coalition, was killed in SAF airstrikes on Nyala.

== April ==
=== 1 April ===
Three people were injured in an RSF drone strike on a medical warehouse in Kosti.

=== 2 April ===
At least 12 people were killed in an RSF drone strike on Al-Jabalain hospital in White Nile State. The RSF raided the Al-Usra Hospital in Ed Daein, injuring medical staff.

Yasser al-Atta was appointed Chief of Staff of the SAF, succeeding Othman al-Hussein.

=== 6 April ===
The SAF retook Al-Tukma from the RSF and SPLM-N (al-Hilu), reopening the road from Dalang to Habila.

General Abdel Fattah al-Burhan issued a decree abolishing the positions of deputy commander and assistants to the commander-in-chief of the SAF.

=== 8 April ===
An SAF drone strike on a wedding in Kutum killed over 58 people and injured 100 more, including RSF members, and destroyed several homes.

=== 11 April ===
Four people were killed by the RSF and SPLM-N (al-Hilu) in the central market of Dalang.

RSF major general Al-Nour Ahmed Adam aka Al-Nour al-Qubba defected to the SAF amid a dispute with other RSF commanders.

=== 13 April ===
Twenty people were killed following two days of SAF drone strikes across Darfur.

=== 14 April ===
Three people were killed in an SAF drone strike in West Darfur that hit the Adukong border crossing with Chad.

=== 18 April ===
The SAF and allied groups launched a major ground operation in North and South Kordofan, with the JDF claiming the recapture of Kazgeil and Al-Hammadi in North Kordofan from the RSF.

Three people were killed in an SAF airstrike on a hospital in Geneina.

=== 20 April ===
The SAF claimed to have retaken Mogja from the RSF and SPLM-N (al-Hilu).

=== 23 April ===
Hemedti sentenced Maj. Gen. Al-Nour al-Qubba to death in absentia following his defection from the RSF earlier in the month.

=== 24 April ===
A drone strike in North Darfur destroyed a vehicle transporting emergency shelter kits for the UNHCR to Tawila.

=== 25 April ===
Seven people were killed and 22 others were injured in an RSF drone strike in El Obeid.

The RSF claimed to have taken Al-Kaili in Blue Nile State, while the SAF claimed to have repelled an RSF attack on Sali, destroying 36 combat vehicles and capturing two others.

=== 27 April ===
Fifteen people were injured in an SAF drone strike on the Hamidiya IDP camp in Zalingei.

=== 28 April ===
The UN imposed sanctions on Hemedti's brother Al-Goney Hamdan Dagalo, who is also the director of procurement for the RSF.

== May ==
=== 1 May ===
The RSF carried out drone strikes on Jabal Awliya, El Obeid and Rahad al-Nuba.

=== 2 May ===
Five people were killed in an RSF drone strike on a vehicle outside Khartoum. A separate strike on the residence of SSF commander Abu Aqla Kaikal in Al-Kahli Zaidan, Gezira State, killed his brother and five other relatives. An SAF drone strike on Balila in Kurmuk killed 10 people.

=== 3 May ===
An RSF drone strike hit the Kenana Sugar Company factory in Rabak, White Nile State.

=== 4 May ===
A drone strike hit Khartoum International Airport and military facilities across Khartoum, which the SAF blamed on the RSF. The SAF also blamed Ethiopia and the United Arab Emirates for harboring the RSF and allowing the attack.

=== 5 May ===
Five people were killed in RSF drone strikes on two fuel stations in Kosti.

=== 7 May ===
The SPLM-N (al-Hilu) claimed to have taken the towns of Dukan and Keren Keren, south of Kurmuk.

=== 9 May ===
The SAF claimed to have retaken Al-Kaili.

=== 10 May ===
The SAF conducted drone strikes on Nyala, including one that targeted a house that was hosting a meeting of senior RSF leaders who left before the attack.

=== 11 May ===
Senior RSF commander Ali Rizq (also Ali Rizqallah) aka Al-Savanna announced his defection from the group.

The RSF-aligned government based in Nyala formed a parallel central bank known as the Transitional Currency Council.

=== 12 May ===
A drone strike near a market in Karnoi, North Darfur, killed and injured many civilians. A suspected SAF drone strike killed two people in Geneina.

=== 13 May ===
At least 61 people were reported killed following clashes between the SPLM-N (al-Hilu) and members of the Atoro tribe in Kauda, South Kordofan.

The RSF claimed to retaken Mogja from the SAF and shot down an SAF Bayraktar Akinci drone over Nyala.

=== 14 May ===
The SAF carried out drone strikes on RSF targets in Nyala.

=== 15 May ===
The SAF retook Khor Hasan in Blue Nile State.

Former RSF commander Al-Savanna went to Khartoum following his defection. He later announced his intention to fight alongside the SAF.

=== 18 May ===
The SAF retook Kern Kern and Doukan in Blue Nile State, and broke the RSF siege of Dalang for the third time.

=== 19 May ===
An SAF drone strike on a market in Ghabesh, West Kordofan, killed 28 people.

=== 21 May ===
Six people were injured in an RSF drone strike that destroyed a warehouse storing medical supplies in Dalang. A later report said two people were also killed in the same airstrike.

The RSF-aligned government in Nyala appointed former Central Bank of Sudan governor Hussein Yahya Jangoul as governor of its Transitional Currency Council.

=== 23 May ===
The SAF claimed to have shot down a drone that originated from Ethiopia near Ed Damazin.

=== 24 May ===
The SAF retook Al-Barka, near Kurmuk.

Fourteen people were killed in an RSF drone strike on a market in Tina.

=== 25 May ===
Five people were killed in an RSF drone strike on a market in Kornoi.

=== 26 May ===
The SAF retook Abdaqla, Adi, Washimbu, Um Shanqar, and Kinshinkaru in Qaysan, Blue Nile State, and forced the RSF to retreat to the Ethiopian border.

=== 28 May ===
At least 58 people were killed in RSF attacks on the villages of Al-Murra, Um Saadoun al-Sharif, and Al-Radha in West Bara, North Kordofan.

The SAF claimed to have repelled a joint RSF and SPLM-N (Toka) attack on the Amora station in Qaysan, Blue Nile State.

=== 30 May ===
Ten people were killed in a drone strike on two vehicles traveling along the Abu Zabad–Al-Fula road in West Kordofan. Ten people were killed in a separate attack in Umm Dukhun, Central Darfur.

The SAF claimed to have shot down an RSF drone over Kenana, White Nile State.

=== 31 May ===
Tribal clashes erupted in South Darfur between the Beni Halba and Salamat tribes involving the use of RSF vehicles on both sides. At least 50 people were reported killed.

== June ==
=== 1 June ===
Twelve people were killed after three missiles targeted a market and a rural hospital in Kubum, South Darfur. Eight people were killed in a drone strike in Umm Rawaba, North Kordofan, while four were killed in a separate attack in Ardamata, West Darfur.

=== 4 June ===
Nine people were killed in a drone strike on Kubum.

=== 5 June ===
The RSF carried out drone strikes on SAF positions on Omdurman, Ed Damazin and Abu Jubeiha in South Kordofan.

Four people were killed in SAF drone strikes in Hamrat El Sheikh, North Kordofan.

=== 6 June ===
Eleven people were killed in a SAF drone strike in Hamrat al-Sheikh.

=== 8 June ===
Three people were killed in an RSF drone strike on two vehicles in Sudri, North Kordofan.

=== 9 June ===
The SAF intercepted several RSF drones over Khartoum.

An SAF drone strike destroyed the Ardamata Bridge in Geneina leading to Chad.

The Switzerland-based Legal Action Worldwide, representing victims of the civil war, filed a complaint against the RSF in Kenya for war crimes, marking the first such legal action against the group outside Sudan.

=== 10 June ===
At least 23 people were killed in RSF drone strikes in El Obeid and Jebel Kordofan.

=== 11 June ===
An RSF drone strike in El Obeid killed 16 people and injured dozens. Sites near the SAF 5th Infantry Division headquarters were also targeted. An RSF strike on a fuel station in Tendalti killed a worker and injured several others.

=== 13 June ===
The SAF said that it repelled a joint RSF and SPLM-N (al-Hilu) attack targeting Amouri, Blue Nile State, causing heavy casualties.

=== 16 June ===
Several people were reported killed in shelling and drone strikes blamed on Egyptian forces targeting gold mines in River Nile State.

=== 18 June ===
At least 50 civilians were reported killed following 10 days of drone strikes on El Obeid and North Kordofan. An RSF drone strike on a car in al-Malha killed nine people and injured 12 others, including several seriously, while an SAF drone strike on a market in the same town injured several people.

The RSF-aligned government ordered the suspension of operations by Médecins Sans Frontières from areas under its control, citing allegations of sexual abuses on refugees in eastern Chad.

=== 19 June ===
RSF drone strikes caused blackouts in El Obeid after hitting its power grid, fuel stations, and tankers.

SPLM-N (Angalo) fighters reportedly killed three people in Kauda, including a Catholic priest.

=== 20 June ===
The RSF claimed to have taken Surkum in the Kurmuk sector.

The SAF said that it conducted extensive drone strikes against RSF positions across North Kordofan to thwart a possible assault on El Obeid.

=== 21 June ===
An RSF drone strike on a fuel station in Kosti killed one person and injured 14.

=== 22 June ===
Two people were killed in a drone strike on El-Obeid. Another person was killed and several were injured in an alleged SAF drone strike on a market in Al-Sayyah, North Darfur. The UN reported that strikes on the city from 18–21 June hit a power substation and fuel station among other targets. Sudan Doctors Network reported the strikes caused shutdown of medical facilities, including a dialysis center, and water stations.

Two key bridges south of Umm Ruwaba were targeted by drones.

A rival Otoro faction captured much of Kauda from the SPLM-N (al-Hilu), setting fire to government sites, churches, and humanitarian offices.

=== 23 June ===
The SAF claimed to have retaken Al-Bar following an offensive near the Ethiopian border in Geissan District in Blue Nile State against the SPLM-N (Touka). The RSF claimed that it captured Ambro in North Darfur. According to the International Organization for Migration (IOM), approximately 1,430 people were displaced from Shatmarta, Sangari, Goz Laban, Dal Barida, and Khair Wajid in North Darfur.

The UNHCR published a report on the weaponization of sexual violence in Sudan, finding it "unprecedented in terms of the scale, prevalence and brutality of its widespread use as a weapon of war". UNHCR said it identified 546 incidents of conflict-related sexual violence affecting 838 victims, which represented "only the tip of the iceberg ... as severe and persistent underreporting and verification challenges continue to constrain the ability to capture the full scale and reality of sexual violence."

=== 24 June ===
The RSF announced that it captured Furuawiya in North Darfur.

=== 25 June ===
An RSF drone strike on a fuel station in Rabak killed two people and injured several others. Another drone targeting El Obeid's Airport neighborhood was shot down by the SAF.

=== 26 June ===
An RSF drone strike on a fuel station in El Obeid killed one person and injured four others. According to the Sudan Humanitarian Aid Commission, the RSF attacked a humanitarian truck en route to El Obeid near El Rahad, killing a driver and wounding several others. Eight students at El Jeel El Raed Private Girls’ School were injured by debris from a drone strike.

The US Department of the Treasury imposed sanctions against five individuals and three corporations accused of supplying weapons and recruiting fighters for the RSF and SAF.

=== 27 June ===
The SAF announced that it recaptured Abu Qamra in North Darfur from the RSF during a joint offensive with allied militias.

=== 29 June ===
The SAF's Fourth Infantry Division announced that it recaptured the areas of Magaja and Sarkam in Blue Nile State from the RSF and SPLM-N (al-Hilu). The JDF meanwhile announced the recapture of Kulbus in West Darfur from the RSF.

Sudan declared a cholera outbreak in West Kordofan, with the Health Ministry reporting 838 suspected cases, seven confirmed cases, and 117 deaths as of 20 June.

=== 30 June ===
The SAF announced that in the past two weeks, it had destroyed 224 RSF military vehicles and captured 36, while destroying two ammunition depots and two fuel depots.

== July ==
=== 1 July ===
The UN said that a drone attack near Tandalti struck a humanitarian aid truck en route to South Kordofan, destroying 50 tonnes of aid. Additional drone attacks in Kosti injured three civilians.

Amnesty International released a report accusing the RSF of committing crimes against humanity and ethnic cleansing during its siege of El Fasher and the El Fasher massacre. The Sudan Doctors Network said that 20 medical workers were believed to be detained by the RSF in El Fasher after they went missing following the capture of the city in October 2025.

=== 2 July ===
The SAF said that it shot down an RSF long-range FH-95 drone over Tandalti.

The SAF and allied Darfur militias recaptured Jebel Moon, 70 km (43 mi) from Geneina.

=== 3 July ===
The IOM reported that the number of newly displaced people in Kordofan rose from 132,000 in February to more than 219,000 by late June, with El Obeid holding over 83,000 IDPs.

=== 4 July ===
The Ugandan government announced that it recognized the SAF-led government as the sole authority in Sudan and rejected the establishment of a parallel government.

=== 5 July ===
The RSF attacked the Zaghawa villages of Qarboura, Oruwa, Um Marahik, Kourbia, Abu Leiha, and Ana Baji in North Darfur, killing and injuring dozens of civilians and displacing thousands to Chad.

=== 7 July ===
Drone strikes on civilian vehicles in RSF-controlled territory in North Kordofan killed 15 people, including five women. Another drone strike in Dalang killed two children and injured several others.

The SAF said that it shot down a Chinese-made FH-95 drone over North Kordofan.

=== 8 July ===
The SAF said that it recaptured Kurmuk from the RSF and the SPLM-N (al-Hilu).

=== 10 July ===
The RSF captured Kulbus after the SAF withdrew from the city, 10 days after it was recaptured by the SAF and allied militias.

=== 13 July ===
The SAF said that it shot down a Chinese-made FH-95 strategic drone northwest of El Obeid.

A court in Port Sudan sentenced Hemedti and 15 other senior RSF commanders to death in absentia for war crimes, crimes against humanity, and genocide over atrocities committed in West Darfur.

=== 14 July ===
The SAF announced that its 4th Infantry Division's 13th Brigade and its Special Operations unit had recaptured Fashfoun in Blue Nile State from the RSF and SPLM-N (al-Hilu).

The European Union imposed a ban on the purchase, import and transfer of gold from Sudan, citing the role of the trade in financing the conflict.

=== 16 July ===
The UK imposed sanctions on 11 individuals and entities linked to illicit gold and financial networks accused of funding both the RSF and the SAF during the conflict.

=== 20 July ===
The US State Department imposed sanctions against the SAF, accusing it of using chemical weapons while fighting the RSF in Khartoum in 2024. A Saudi plane carrying 10 tons of humanitarian aid sent by the King Salman Humanitarian Aid and Relief Center landed in Khartoum.

=== 21 July ===
A suspected RSF drone strike on a water hub in Tina killed 21 people and injured at least 30 others. The SAF deployed reinforcements to sites in the Sahara, including al-Khanaq and al-Raheb in North Darfur.

=== 22 July ===
A drone strike from Sudan injured several civilians and damaged markets in Tiné Djagaraba, Chad. UNICEF reported that a drone strike on a market in Al-Rahad in North Darfur killed six people, including two children, and injured 26 others.

=== 23 July ===
An SAF drone strike hit a group of displaced people in Badia in Blue Nile, killing and injuring dozens.

=== 24 July ===
An RSF attack in Burbur in North Kordofan killed 15 people and injured seven others, while RSF drone strikes targeted several water stations in Um Nabaq and Rahad Al-Nuba.

=== 25 July ===
A drone strike on a vehicle in Um Daraba in North Kordofan killed two people.

The SAF retook Bara, Umm Garfa, Umm Sayala and Jabra al-Sheikh following operations against the RSF, according to Darfur governor Minni Minnawi.

=== 26 July ===
A drone attack in Al-Sha'atout in North Kordofan hit a water well, a healthcare center, and a school, while an airstrike on a fuel vehicle in Um Badr killed and injured dozens of civilians.

=== 27 July ===
The SAF claimed full control over the Khartoum-El-Obeid highway.

Hemedti granted his field commanders autonomy to launch military operations without approval from the RSF's central command.

=== 28 July ===
The RSF attacked Al-Jamama in North Kordofan, destroying a market and injuring dozens of people.

=== 29 July ===
A retreating RSF contingent from North Kordofan launched several reprisal raids against villages in the area, looting buildings and arresting alleged SAF collaborators. The SAF concurrently launched drone strikes against RSF convoys in Sowdari, Um Badr, and El Mazroub.

=== 30 July ===
The SAF conducted a wave of airstrikes against RSF positions in West and North Kordofan.

== August ==
=== 2 August ===
An alleged SAF drone strike on a customary court in Kabkabiya District, North Darfur, killed 37 people and injured around 40 others. Several RSF field commanders and Rizeigat tribal leaders were among the casualties.

=== 4 August ===
The RSF said that it captured Bir Saliba in West Darfur after clashes with the JDF, during which RSF Brig. Gen. Mahdi Jebel Moon, who led operations north of Geneina, was killed.

=== 7 August ===
An RSF raid in Al-Tamid, near El Obeid, killed five people and injured several others. The SAF's 54th Brigade shot down an RSF kamikaze drone targeting military positions near Dalang.

=== 8 August ===
The JDF said that it repelled an RSF attempt to encircle Bir Saliba in West Darfur. The SPLM-N (al-Hilu) attacked Otoro villages in Kauda and abducted four humanitarian workers from Samaritan's Purse.

=== 9 August ===
A mass grave containing the bodies of 25 civilians executed by the RSF was uncovered by the SAF in Kurmuk.

=== 11 August ===
The RSF and SPLM-N (al-Hilu) launched a joint offensive in Geissan, reportedly from Ethiopian territory. The RSF claimed that it captured the city and inflicted heavy losses on the SAF. The UN said that clashes in the city killed 20 civilians and displaced 2,500 others.

=== 12 August ===
The RSF launched drone attacks on El Obeid, Atbara, Omdurman, and Khartoum North, with most attacks being repelled by the SAF. In El Obeid, two people were killed and eight others were injured, and a water station was struck.

Hamad Mohammad Hamad Khalifa, the RSF-appointed governor of Kordofan, defected from the organization and resigned from his post.

=== 13 August ===
Several RSF drones were shot down over Omdurman. The SAF and JDF reportedly repelled an RSF attack on Jebrat al Sheikh, killing dozens of fighters and capturing 60 others. Fighting was also reported in Bara.

The RSF recaptured Kurmuk from the SAF. The JDF claimed that it recaptured Amburu in North Darfur and inflicted heavy casualties on the RSF, although the RSF claimed that it repelled the attack.

The SAF said that 270 fighters and 21 commanders from the RSF's Groups 55 and 47 surrendered in al Dabbah.

=== 14 August ===
Heavy clashes occurred near El Obeid, with at least two RSF advances being repelled by the SAF between al-Iyara and Umm Arada, where at least 18 civilians were killed, 17 were injured, and 300 families were displaced by the RSF.

The World Health Organization announced that 37% of Sudan's medical facilities were out of service, adding that over 900 attacks on healthcare sites were recorded between January and August 2026, resulting in at least 900 deaths.

=== 15 August ===
RSF gunmen reportedly killed two Messiria tribesmen and injured another in northern Abyei.

=== 17 August ===
The SAF said that it shot down an RSF FH-95 drone over Jureijikh and a second one over Bara.

The IOM said that 5,355 people had been displaced from Geissan in four days.

=== 19 August ===
A group of 300 RSF fighters, led by Brig. Gen. Musa Khamiseen, defected to the SAF in Al Dabbah, sparking criticism from allied Darfur militias who accused Khamiseen of participating in the El Fasher massacre.

=== 20 August ===
The SPLM-N (al-Hilu) recaptured Kauda from Otoro fighters. RSF attacks in Um Dareisa and Al-Shaqla in North Kordofan killed six civilians and displaced over 1,000 others to El Obeid.

=== 23 August ===
The Chadian military accused the SAF of carrying out drone strikes on a convoy in Ennedi Est, which the SAF denied. The JDF said that it attacked an RSF convoy near the Libyan border, destroying 49 vehicles and capturing 70 RSF members, while losing four of its own fighters.

A Baykar Bayraktar Akinci drone from Ethiopia was reportedly shot down by the SAF near Kurmuk.

=== 24 August ===
Suspected SAF drone strikes hit several RSF positions in Nyala, as well as areas near Nyala Airport and the Nyala University campus.

=== 25 August ===
The SPLM-N (al-Hilu) killed 27 people, including four children, in the Otoro villages of Qardud and Abu Hamama in South Kordofan.

=== 27 August ===
The SAF said that it shot down a drone from Ethiopia over Sarkam in Blue Nile. It later said that it repelled an RSF offensive in al-Keli in the same state, killing and capturing dozens of fighters.

The Sudanese government lifted a curfew and state of emergency in Khartoum that had been in effect since 2024.

The JEM said that 265 fighters from an RSF-allied faction led by Suleiman Sandal, including 15 officers, defected to the SAF and JDF.

Chad accused the SAF of striking a fuel market used by the RSF near the Chad–Sudan border, killing 12 people and injuring seven others. A double-tap drone strike in Sowdari killed eight civilians and injured dozens of others. The SAF was accused of carrying out a drone strike on the Adekong market in West Darfur, killing and injuring dozens of people, including Chadians.

=== 28 August ===
The RSF claimed that it captured the SAF bases in Bakori and Surkum in Blue Nile alongside the SPLM-N (Touka). The SAF said that it repelled a joint RSF and SPLM-N (Touka) offensive in Fazogli.

A human rights organization accused four JDF fighters of raping a woman in Um Badda District in Omdurman the day prior, which the group denied.

=== 29 August ===
The SAF's 4th Infantry Division announced the deployment of the intelligence service's "Elite Brigade" to Bakori.

An RSF attack on al-Qaa and al-Kawakiti in North Kordofan killed five civilians and displaced 3,000 others.

The Governor of West Darfur said the JDF captured Abu Suruq.

=== 31 August ===
Around 200 RSF fighters defected to the SAF in Omdurman, including Abubakr Hamouda Dahloub, the group's head of intelligence in North Kordofan.

The IOM said that 450 people were displaced from Al-Gardud Abu Zeid in North Kordofan the day prior.

The Preliminary Committee of the Sudan Doctors' Trade Union, the leading doctor's union in the country, announced that its director, Attiya Abdallah, was arrested by Sudanese Military Intelligence in Al Qadarif State earlier in the month.

== September ==
=== 1 September ===
The SAF said that advanced JDF units were deployed to Ad-Damazin against the RSF and SPLM-N following the militias' advances in Blue Nile.

=== 2 September ===
The WFP announced that a convoy consisting of two trucks was hit by an airstrike near Dalang on 30 August, destroying aid meant for 5,800 people. The Sudan Doctors Network reported that the attack killed one person and injured two others, while accusing the RSF of responsibility.

=== 3 September ===
The SPLM-N (al-Hilu) killed 21 people, including women and children, in the Otoro areas of Debi and Luweri in Kauda.

=== 4 September ===
The SPLM-N (al-Hilu) shelled civilian sites in Dalang, killing five people, including a child. The SAF said that it repelled a joint RSF–SPLM-N (Touka) offensive in al-Baraka district in Kurmuk, inflicting heavy losses.

=== 6 September ===
The SAF and JDF recaptured Hamrat al-Wiz in North Kordofan.

=== 7 September ===
The SAF recaptured Al-Safiya in North Kordofan.

=== 8 September ===
An RSF drone attack on a court in Umm Ruwaba killed at least 13 people and injured 22 others.

Famine conditions were reported to have begun in Jebel Marra, where the SLM-AW-aligned government said that 20 people were dying every day.

=== 9 September ===
The SPLM-N (al-Hilu) was accused of attacking the Otoro villages of Ramtala, Al-Muqrayh, and Kalqa in South Kordofan, killing and injuring several people.

=== 10 September ===
The RSF conducted drone attacks in several parts of Omdurman, including the Sarkab military camp. One person was killed and nine others were injured by debris.

=== 11 September ===
The RSF and SPLM-N (Touka) said that they captured Madal Abiqo, Beli Bong, and Kambarda in Blue Nile and were pushing towards Ad-Damazin, adding that they had captured Dokan, Karn Karn, and Khor Al-Hassan earlier in the week.

The UN Security Council unanimously voted to extend the Darfur weapons embargo for one month.

=== 12 September ===
The SAF said that it seized a weapons shipment south of Red Sea State that included a 9M133 Kornet missile system.

=== 13 September ===
The SAF said that it shot down a drone targeting its positions in Balang. Later, the RSF launched a wave of drone attacks on Ad-Damazin, hitting a fuel station and other targets, including sites near the airport and a military hospital.

=== 14 September ===
Overnight drone strikes in Ad-Damazin killed four people and injured several others.

=== 15 September ===
The SAF said that it repelled drone attacks on the Upper Atbara and Setit dams in Al Qadarif State and the Khashm al-Girba dam in Kassala State.

=== 17 September ===
The SAF said that it recaptured 11 areas in North Kordofan, inflicting heavy casualties on the RSF.

=== 18 September ===
The SAF said that it ambushed RSF and SPLM-N fighters near al-Kaili in Blue Nile, killing several and destroying around 10 vehicles. The 4th Infantry Division said that it shot down an RSF drone in Kurmuk.

The SAF recaptured al-Jamama from the RSF in North Kordofan.

=== 20 September ===
RSF drone strikes in El Obeid killed two people and injured 22 others.

A humanitarian aid worker died while being held by the RSF in the Shala Prison in El Fasher.

=== 21 September ===
The SAF said that it advanced in Kurmuk, capturing the areas of Balbung, Midel and Khor al-Hassan and seizing equipment. It also struck several targets and made ground advancements in North Kordofan, where the RSF attacked a gold market in Umm Badr, killing five people and injuring 27.

The Sudan Founding Alliance (Tasis) accused the SAF of striking a pipeline carrying South Sudanese oil north of Al Hamadi in South Kordofan earlier in the month, killing seven Tasis members.

=== 22 September ===
The SAF launched overnight airstrikes against several RSF targets in Nyala, including sites near the airport and a former UNAMID base. The RSF detained several alleged spies at a cafe and Starlink sites after the attacks.

=== 24 September ===
The SAF said that it shot down an RSF FH-95 drone near al-Kawkiti in North Kordofan. The RSF said that it shot down a Baykar Bayraktar drone in Blue Nile.

=== 25 September ===
The SAF recaptured Sowdari from the RSF.

An SAF drone strike on a market in al-Mazrub in North Kordofan killed 17 civilians and injured several others. An RSF strike on a displacement center in El Obeid killed two people and injured 20 others.

RSF commander Al-Tayeb al-Wahidu and 50 other fighters defected to the SAF in Omdurman.

=== 26 September ===
Saudi Arabia accused the RSF of striking an aid truck operated by the King Salman Humanitarian Aid and Relief Center near El Obeid on 17 August, destroying 1,150 food parcels. The RSF was also accused of looting and destroying the Sodari Rural Hospital, following the town's recapture by the SAF.

=== 27 September ===
An RSF drone strike hit the Um Aleila fuel depot near Abu Haraz in Gezira State.

The SAF said that it shot down an RSF FH-95 drone near Tinna in North Kordofan. It also conducted airstrikes against at least three areas in Nyala.

The SPLM-N (al-Hilu) was accused of executing eight Otoro prisoners at the Mandi detention facility in Heiban District.

=== 28 September ===
Sudanese media reported that an SAF airstrike in Umm Badr killed a senior Libyan military officer who was an advisor for the RSF.

=== 29 September ===
A community leader in the Nuba Mountains said that over 500 Otoro people had been killed and 25,000 others were displaced in Kauda and the surrounding area over the past six months.

=== 30 September ===
The General Coordination for Displaced Persons and Refugees in Darfur announced that 30 children died from malnutrition in Suni, Jebel Marra, while 100 cases of severe acute malnutrition were documented.

== October ==
=== 1 October ===
An RSF drone strike on a dormitory belonging to the University of Kordofan in El Obeid killed five people and injured 47. UNICEF reported that a drone strike on the Al Mina Al Bari displacement shelter in El Obeid killed a child and injured 12 others.

=== 2 October ===
The SAF recaptured al-Mazroub in North Kordofan.

=== 3 October ===
The RSF executed at least 25 civilians in Umm Badr. It was also reported that over the past two days, the group launched drone attacks against WFP convoys in Dalang, seriously injuring its personnel, and in North Kordofan, killing a worker.

The SAF said that it shot down RSF drones targeting civilian sites and the home of the governor of Blue Nile in Ad-Damazin. The 4th Infantry Division later said that it targeted RSF and allied fighters in Minza and Bashkarkad in Blue Nile, inflicting heavy casualties.

=== 4 October ===
The SPLM-N said that it captured the Kadalou border zone of Er Roseires, taking several prisoners of war.

RSF drone strikes hit civilian sites in Dalang, killing four people.

The RSF was accused of seizing 32 WFP trucks that were delivering aid to communities in North Darfur.

Maj. Gen. Mohamadain Ismail Abu Zira, the chief of the general staff of the RSF-allied Sudan Liberation Forces Grouping, defected to the SAF alongside 124 fighters in Tina.

=== 5 October ===
Fighting broke out between the JDF and RSF in Bir Saliba and Abu Suruj in West Darfur, with the JDF claiming the capture of seven combat vehicles.

=== 7 October ===
RSF drone strikes hit residential areas, including the homes of cabinet members, in Ad-Damazin, killing four civilians.

=== 8 October ===
Clashes between locals and the RSF in Edd al Fursan District killed 11 people, including an RSF officer.

RSF Special Tasks Group commander Lt. Col. Mohammed Azraq al-Fanjari defected from the organization alongside 300 fighters.

=== 9 October ===
An RSF drone strike hit a water facility at a gold mining site in Abu Shendi in Wad el-Mahi, killing 41 people, including eight children and many women. RSF drone attacks in El Obeid injured six civilians.

An unexploded mine detonated in Babanusa earlier in the week, killing four people. The RSF was also accused of killing four family members a day after attempting to loot their home in Al-Mazroub in North Kordofan.

The UN Security Council extended an arms embargo against Darfur by two months.

=== 10 October ===
SAF drone strikes in West Kordofan killed 16 civilians over the past 48 hours, including 12 in a shelter in En Nahud. A mother and three children were killed by SPLM-N (al-Hilu) shelling in Kadugli. At least 72 people were reportedly killed by Egyptian Air Force airstrikes on camps at the Uqaydat gold mine in River Nile State, near the Egyptian border.

=== 11 October ===
An RSF attack seriously damaged the Um Darfa hospital in Blue Nile.

=== 13 October ===
Sudan Liberation Movement/Army (Minnawi) co-founder and senior commander Maj. Gen. Dosa Issa al-Tayeb al-Tijani defected to Tasis alongside 220 fighters.

=== 14 October ===
The SAF said that it recaptured Bir Kelekel in West Darfur from the RSF.

=== 15 October ===
An SAF Antonov aircraft struck a house in Abu Zaima in North Kordofan, killing five children and wounding their mother.

=== 16 October ===
A drone strike on a cattle market in Nyala killed 30 civilians, including five children and 17 women and injured 47 others. The SAF said that it struck RSF positions and command centers in Nyala, claiming that it killed dozens of RSF combatants. The RSF accused Egypt of participating in the strikes.

Bashar Al-Nahli, a senior RSF media official, was killed in an airstrike in Umm Samima, between North and West Kordofan.

=== 17 October ===
The RSF launched drone attacks on a artisanal gold mining site in South Kordofan, causing damage. An SAF drone strike hit a civilian vehicle near Ankoush in West Kordofan, killing four people. A separate strike on an IDP camp near Sanakit killed nine children.

=== 18 October ===
The SAF said that it shot down RSF attack drones targeting El-Gadarif and Kassala. An RSF attack targeting displaced people in the Hajar Sanakeet region in Sirba killed 11 people and injured dozens more. An alleged SAF double-tap drone strike on a truck carrying mourners arriving to a funeral and a tent in al-Dibab in West Kordofan killed at least 150 people and injured 150 others, while four others were injured in nearby al-Mujlad.

=== 19 October ===
An SAF drone strike on the Amiet Market in Abyei killed more than 220 people. The SAF said that it shot down RSF drones targeting the Khartoum International Airport; a home east of the airport was struck, killing four civilians. Another drone attack in Nyala killed 17 people, including seven RSF officers, and injured 23 others.

The SAF said that it repelled an RSF–SPLM-N assault on al-Baraka in Kurmuk.

=== 20 October ===
An RSF drone struck the Tandalti power station, cutting off electricity to the city and other parts of North Kordofan. The SAF said that it repelled an RSF and SPLM-N (al-Hilu) assault on the Sally region in Blue Nile. A drone strike on Bamina in Chad killed three Sudanese refugees and two aid workers.

=== 21 October ===
Middle East Eye reported that volunteers in Bara and surrounding villages had recovered and buried more than 600 bodies, most of them civilians, following fighting in the area. Local activists and volunteers attributed most of the deaths to revenge killings by the RSF after the group entered Bara in October 2025. Hundreds of additional bodies were reported to remain unburied in and around the town. One volunteer told Middle East Eye that "there is now no life left in Bara", while others warned of deteriorating sanitary conditions and the spread of disease.

SAF airstrikes in Nyala reportedly killed 21 RSF members, including three officers. Among the dead was Hemedti's nephew.

=== 22 October ===
The SAF recaptured the Uklili area and the Bakori military base in Blue Nile.

Drone strikes killed two civilians and injured six civilians at a gold mine in Taludi in South Kordofan and killed two others civilians at a house in Er Rahad. Strikes on two markets in Ed Daein and Abu Jabra in East Darfur killed two, including a child, and injured five others.

=== 26 October ===
RSF drone attacks hit five power plants across the states of Gezira, Al Qadarif, and White Nile, causing major power outages.

The United Kingdom sanctioned 15 military commanders from the SAF and RSF over alleged atrocities committed during the El Fasher massacre.

At least 102 people were killed, including many RSF fighters, and 113 others were wounded in a drone attack on a market in Nyala. Tasis put the death toll at 188, with 356 others injured. The Kordofan Observatory reported that three civilians died while detained by the RSF in Nyala's Dagris prison.

=== 27 October ===
Drone strikes against gold mines in El Leri in South Kordofan killed five people and injured six others, while another strike on the Markhiyat power station near Omdurman caused a power outage in Khartoum.

The SAF said that it repelled an offensive by the RSF and the SPLM-N (Touka) against the Sally region in Blue Nile, capturing 15 vehicles and destroying five.

=== 28 October ===
Drone strikes hit fuel depots and a power plant in El Manaqil and Hayya. RSF and SPLM-N drone attacks on civilian and power infrastructure in Kadugli injured eight people. Sudan accused Ethiopia of responsibility for the drone strikes on power infrastructure across the country.

=== 29 October ===
A drone strike on the Um Dabaker power station in Rabak cut off power to White Nile and North Kordofan. RSF drone strikes in Karnoi in North Darfur killed five people. Drone strikes targeted civilian infrastructure, including gold mines, markets, a school, and a hospital, in Blue Nile.

A federal court in Abu Dhabi sentenced eight people, including Yasser al-Atta and Salah Gosh, to life imprisonment in absentia for arms trafficking and money laundering to the SAF.

=== 30 October ===
Siddiq Ander, a senior commander in the RSF announced his defection.

RSF drones struck military sites, a power station, and a Nile Petroleum Corporation fuel depot in Shendi.

=== 31 October ===
RSF drones struck an electrical transformer station and an oil station in Hayya.

== November ==
=== 1 November ===
RSF drones struck the Al Dabbah and Abu Hamad power stations, causing power outages. Attacks also hit an SAF headquarters and fuel depots in Al Dabbah, killing a woman.

=== 2 November ===
RSF drone strikes destroyed the Aroma and Halfa El Jadida power stations in Kassala and damaged another station in Merowe. A drone strike in El Dibo in Al Sunut District killed eight people.

The SAF said that it shot down an FH-95 drone near Wad Banda.

=== 3 November ===
The RSF and SPLM-N (al-Hilu) captured the Sali military base in Blue Nile. The SAF said that it shot down a drone from Ethiopia over the same state.

Brig. Gen. Haroun Mersal, the JDF's operational commander in Kordofan, was killed during combat in Um Shaeira in North Kordofan. An RSF drone strike on a fuel depot in El Abassiya District killed seven people and injured 36 others.

=== 4 November ===
An overnight RSF drone attack targeted military and civilian infrastructure in Ad-Damazin, killing two people. An SAF airstrike on a water station in Umm Badr killed two women and injured 10 others.

The RSF detained dozens of medical professionals and academics in Al Geneina District.

=== 5 November ===
The SAF and its allies recaptured Kazgeil and Abu Qaoud in North Kordofan.

Australia imposed sanctions on SAF chief Abdel Fattah al-Burhan, Hemedti, RSF officials Hussein Barsham and Al-Tijani Karshoum, and the Al-Bara' ibn Malik Battalion.

=== 7 November ===
The SAF recaptured Iyad Bakhit in West Kordofan and shot down an FH-95 drone near the town.

=== 8 November ===
Clashes erupted in the areas of Abu Minaiqir and Um Kuraidim in West Kordofan, with footage uploaded by the JDF showing the capture and destruction of dozens of RSF military vehicles. The SAF also shot down an FH-95 drone near Wad Banda. The RSF and SPLM-N captured Maqja in Blue Nile.

The SAF detained National Congress Party chairman Ahmed Haroun, who was wanted by the International Criminal Court over his alleged role in war crimes and genocide during the War in Darfur.

=== 10 November ===
An RSF drone strike in Bani Shako in Blue Nile killed at least 16 civilians and injured six others.

=== 11 November ===
The SAF shot down two RSF drones over Ayal Bikhait in West Kordofan and Ed Daein.

=== 13 November ===
The SAF recaptured Serif Ankoush and al-Khuwai in West Kordofan. It also said that it shot down a long-range drone from Ethiopia over Dandaro in Blue Nile.

=== 14 November ===
The SAF and allies recaptured Khamasat, Markab, and Umm Oweisha in West Kordofan amid their advance towards En Nahud, where the RSF killed ten civilians since 12 November.

Gen. Ahmed Abdallah Bishr, the army chief of the Gathering of Sudan Liberation Forces, died from wounds sustained following an SAF airstrike on his home in Nyala on 19 October.

One person was killed and 45 others were injured in El Obeid by celebratory gunfire over false reports that the SAF had captured En Nahud.

=== 15 November ===
RSF field commander in Saraf Omra Ahmed Hasab Al-Rasoul defected to the SAF.

The SAF struck several RSF sites in northern West Kordofan, including in En Nahud, while capturing several villages along the path to the city.

=== 16 November ===
An SAF strike in West Kordofan's Abu Qalb area killed 13 civilians, including children and women.

=== 18 November ===
The JDF said that it repelled an RSF offensive in the area of Kornoi, capturing dozens of combat vehicles. The SAF shot down a long-range drone over Seleia in West Darfur.

Port Sudan's Anti-Terrorism and Crimes Against the State Court sentenced Hemedti and 13 other RSF commanders to death in absentia.

=== 19 November ===
The SAF struck an RSF headquarters in Nyala, killing and injuring dozens of fighters, including an officer and members of its intelligence and media departments.

The RSF said that it captured Bau in Blue Nile. It also claimed to have captured Derang and Al-Madina 12, although the SAF claimed that it ambushed RSF fighters in Derang, causing casualties.

=== 20 November ===
The RSF and SPLM-N said that they captured Khor Mak, Al-Madina 10, Al-Madina 11, Singa Nabag, and Al-Taqa in Geissan District.

=== 22 November ===
Drone attacks in Omdurman and Jabal Awliya, near Khartoum, that were blamed on the RSF killed four people, including a child, and injured at least nine others. The strikes damaged a UN building in Khartoum while staff were inside, as SAF sources alleged that the drones had been launched from Bahir Dar Airport in Ethiopia.

The SAF-aligned government accused the RSF of executing captured army personnel in Blue Nile.
