= Second Battle of En Nahud =

Military operation in West Kordofan

- Part of the Kordofan campaign (2023-present)
Date	14 November 2026 - present
Location	outskirts east of En Nahud, West Kordofan, Sudan
Status	Ongoing

Belligerents
Sudanese Government; Sudanese Armed Forces	Rapid Support Forces
- The Sudanese Armed Forces(SAF) is currently comitting an offensive in this area toward El Nahud and Al-Khiwai as of November 7th 2026 in the states of South and West Kordofan

The Second Battle of En Nahud, is a current SAF attack on areas on the outskirts of the city and areas near the road between En Nahud and Al-Khiwai.

== Background ==
On 15 April 2023, conflict broke out between the Rapid Support Forces (RSF), and the Sudanese Armed Forces (SAF). Sight of conflict has been in Khartoum, Kordofan, and Darfur. Fighting in West Kordofan erupted in areas in the state of West Kordofan. On 1 May 2025, En Nahud fell to the RSF and was looted, with 319 civilians losing their lives. By the end of 2025, RSF had controlled the entirety of the state.

Within the first two weeks of November 2026, the SAF recaptured Al-Khiwai locality. This led to the SAF advancing on En Nahud.

== Battle ==
On 14 November, the SAF reported a number of RSF fighters and its detainees withdrew to Nyala. The SAF also strengthened its forces near En Nahud, in the area of Al-Nudha. On 15 November, SAF captured the villages Khamasat, Markab, and Umm Oweisha. The SAF also launched airstrikes in the town, as well as Donkey El For, El Odaya, Ghabeish, Munim, and Wad El Hileau.
