= Al-Khiwai offensive =

Military operation in West Kordofan

- Part of the Kordofan campaign (2023-present) and the aftermath of the Siege of El Obeid
Date	7 – 13 November 2026
Location	Al-Khiwai locality, West Kordofan, Sudan.
Result	SAF victory: SAF recapture Al-Khiwai on 13 November; SAF forces advance to En Nahud

Belligerents
Sudanese Government; Sudanese Armed Forces	Rapid Support Forces

Casualties and losses
Unknown	2 drones destroyed 40 vehicles captured 20 vehicles destroyed

On 7 November 2026, the SAF advanced into West Kordofan after a year of RSF control. The advances come after most of North Kordofan was recaptured by the SAF over the previous months. Within days of entering West Kordofan, the SAF brought the entire Al-Khiwai locality under its control and began advancing towards En Nahud.

== Background ==
On 15 April 2023, conflict broke out between the Rapid Support Forces (RSF), and the Sudanese Armed Forces (SAF). Sight of conflict has been in Khartoum, Kordofan, and Darfur. Fighting in West Kordofan erupted in Babanusa, El Nahud, El Fulah, and other areas in the state of West Kordofan. By the end of 2025, RSF had controlled the entirety of the state.

Amid the government's autumn 2026 offensives and the capture of Umm Sumeima, a town on the westernmost border of North Kordofan, the SAF positioned itself to enter West Kordofan for the first time after almost a year. The state had not been contested since the fall of Babanusa.

== Offensive ==
On 7 November, SAF entered the town of Iyal Bakhit in Al-Khiwai locality, downed an RSF drone, and advanced within 100 km from RSF controlled Al-Khiwei. The next day, the SAF reported to have shot a "hostile" FH-95 drone east of Wad Banda. The army also seized control of Umm Marahik and posted footage showing destroyed RSF vehicles. Battles also erupted in Abu Minaiqir, 55 km north of El-Khiwai.

Advancing from the north in the Iyal Bakhit direction, SAF captured Serif Ankoush, a settlement 20 kilometers west of Al-Khiwai, on 13 November, splitting the B-26 highway between En Nahud and Al-Khiwai. Later the same day, the SAF advanced westward along the B-26 and captured Al-Khiwai along with the remaining settlements between Serif Ankoush and Umm Sumeima.

== Aftermath ==
Following the capture of Al-Khiwai, the SAF continued advancing westward, taking control of Al-Murkab and closing within 60 kilometers of El Nahud.
