= Fashion (disambiguation) =

Fashion is the style and custom prevalent at a given time.

Fashion may also refer to:

== Film and television ==
- Fashion (2008 film), a Bollywood film directed by Madhur Bhandarkar
- FashionTelevision, a 1985–2012 Canadian-produced program
- Fashion Television (TV channel), a 2001–2021 Canadian pay-television channel
- FashionTV, a French-produced international television channel launched in 1997
- "Fashion" (Absolutely Fabulous), a 1992 TV episode
- "Fashion" (QI), a 2009 TV episode

== Music ==
- Fashion (band), a UK new wave band
- The Fashion, a Danish indie band
  - The Fashion (album), a 2007 album by the band

=== Songs ===
- "Fashion" (David Bowie song), 1980
- "Fashion" (Hanoi Rocks song), 2007
- "Fashion", by Cortis from Color Outside the Lines, 2025
- "Fashion", by Lady Gaga from Confessions of a Shopaholic (soundtrack), 2009
- "Fashion", by Taeyeon from Why, 2016
- "Fashion!", by Lady Gaga from Artpop, 2013

== Other media ==
- Fashion (magazine), a Canadian magazine
- The Fashion (website), a defunct fashion-site aggregator
- Fashion, a play by Anna Cora Mowatt
- Fashion, a play by Doug Lucie

== Other uses ==
- Fashion (horse) (1837–1860), an American Thoroughbred racemare
- USS Fashion, a United States Navy freight lighter 1918–1922

== See also ==
- Fashfoun, place in Sudan
