= 2026 Amiet market drone strike =

2026 airstrike in Abyei

- Part of the Sudanese civil war (2023–present)
- Location: 9°43′1″N 28°28′16″E; Amiet Common Market, Abyei
- Date: 19 October 2026; 11:30 CAT (UTC+2)
- Target: Fuel tankers supplying the RSF (per SAF)
- Attack type: Drone strike
- Deaths: 220+
- Injuries: 20+
- Perpetrator: Sudanese Armed Forces

On 19 October 2026, a drone attack was launched on the Amiet Common Market in Abyei, a UN-patrolled territory claimed by both Sudan and South Sudan. The strike is alleged to have been carried out by the Sudanese Armed Forces (SAF), killing more than 220 people and displacing over 8,000 others. The strike targeted a fuel depot that was reportedly used by the Rapid Support Forces (RSF), although other parts of the market were also struck, resulting in its complete destruction. A Sudanese official initially said that the strikes targeted fuel tankers that were supplying the RSF, claiming that the casualties were members of the militia and fuel smugglers. The SAF later denied involvement in the attack.

== Background ==
Since April 2023, a civil war has been fought between the Sudanese Armed Forces (SAF) and the Rapid Support Forces (RSF), in which drones have increasingly been used. A day before the attack, an alleged-SAF drone strike killed over 150 people in West Kordofan, while an RSF drone attack near the Khartoum International Airport killed four the following day.

The Amiet Common Market, which serves the Ngok Dinka and Messiria people, is located 10 kilometres (6.2 mi) from the town of Abyei. Sovereignty of the oil-rich Abyei region, which borders Kordofan, has been disputed by Sudan and South Sudan since the latter's independence in 2011. The United Nations Interim Security Force for Abyei (UNISFA) warned in May 2026 that the RSF was active in Abyei, putting civilians at risk, although the territory's caretaker Minister of Information has denied the militia's presence. The fuel depot targeted in the strikes had allegedly been used by the RSF in the past.

== Airstrike ==
Around 11:30 CAT (UTC+2) on 19 October, a fuel depot in the northern part of the Amiet Common Market was struck by seven munitions allegedly launched by SAF drones, according to Abyei interim minister of information Yohana Akol Ngor. The Abyei Special Administrative Area said that 22 munitions were launched into the crowded market. The first strike hit a tractor-trailer carrying 26 people, causing many casualties. Further strikes hit different parts of the market, including its center, south, and its northern gate, igniting a fire and reportedly destroying the entire market and an estimated 500 shops. BBC News verified videos showing major damage in the northeast part of the market, where several buildings were set ablaze; two large fires were also seen rising from buildings in the part of the market near the fuel depot. The fire was still burning the following day. Trucks were also destroyed in the attack, some of which had their tires melted.

The death toll was initially reported as 73, although Yohana Akol Ngor announced a day later that it had risen to 153. It was later reported that the death toll was over 220, with 153 victims being buried in one mass grave and 73 in a second. At least 30 of the deceased had succumbed to their injuries after the attack. Among the dead were women, children, merchants, Ngor Dinka people, South Sudanese nationals, and Sudanese refugees. At least four Somalis were also killed. Some of the bodies were burned beyond recognition; recovery efforts were also hampered by the fire. The United Nations added that many others were missing, with the death toll expected to rise. Over 8,000 people were internally displaced in the attack, some of whom sought shelter under trees. More than 20 wounded victims were treated by Médecins Sans Frontières at Ameth Bek Hospital, where several were in critical condition. UNISFA dispatched medical teams and firefighting equipment to evacuate the wounded and contain the fire. On 22 October, UNISFA announced that it had extinguished the fires, while confirming a death toll of at least 80, in addition to 27 others injured.

== Aftermath ==
South Sudanese president Salva Kiir condemned the attack, with his government summoning Sudan's ambassador, Isam Mohamed Hassan Karrar, in protest. Residents in Abyei participated in mass protests on the streets to condemn the attack, which they blamed on the SAF. United Nations secretary-general António Guterres and African Union Commission chairman Mahamoud Ali Youssouf condemned the attack.

The RSF-led Government of Peace and Unity submitted an official complaint to the UN Independent International Fact-Finding Mission on Sudan, claiming that the attack violated international law.

A senior Sudanese official confirmed that strikes by the army targeted fuel tankers that came from South Sudan, claiming that they were being sent to the RSF. He said the casualties were RSF members and fuel smugglers but proferred no evidence. The SAF later denied involvement in the attack, likening it to atrocities committed by the RSF. The Sudanese foreign ministry offered condolences to the victims' families. The Abyei Joint Oversight Committee, led by Sudan, called for a UNIFSA investigation into the attack.

The closure of the Amiet market, which served as Abyei's main outlet for food, fuel, and medicine, led to a deterioration in living conditions, with many merchants losing their jobs.
