= Barsham =

Barsham may refer to:

- Barsham, Norfolk, England
- Barsham, Suffolk, England
- Hussein Barsham, Sudanese military official
- Meshaal Barsham (born 1998), Qatari footballer
- Muamer Barsham (born 1994), Qatari high jumper
- Mutaz Barsham (born 1991), Qatari high jumper
