= Hassan Musa =

Sudanese Modernist visual artist

- Born: 1951; En Nuhud District (Sudan)
- Education: University of Montpellier Paul Valéry
- Occupations: Painter, textile artist
- Website: hassanmusaofficial.com

Hassan Musa (born 1951 in En Nahud, Sudan), is a Sudanese-born French contemporary painter. He is one of the Sudanese pioneers in contemporary art and zoomorphic calligraphy. Musa's artwork is known to adapt, mix and combine diverse styles from contrasting parts of the world: his stylistic inspirations are rooted from European painting, Arabic calligraphy and Chinese watercolor. Musa's paintings gather printed textiles which are utilized as canvas. Its theme habitually appropriates classical Western artworks to approach and challenge well-known figures such as Osama bin Laden, Che Guevara, Vincent van Gogh or Josephine Baker. One of the most well-known statements of the artist is “Images are like blows: we receive them, we give them back. We transmit violent things because that is the way we receive them. It's a way to survive, my images are my line of defense”. Musa here elaborates on how he uses his interpretation on western politics, culture and art to revive images present in the world through giving it back to the people.

Musa was born in 1951 in El Nuhud, Sudan. He lives in Domessargues, France.

== Education ==
Musa earned a master's degree from the College of Fine and Applied Art at the Sudan University of Science and Technology, Khartoum, in 1976 and a doctorate in Fine Art and Art History from the University of Montpellier, France, in 1979.

== Work ==
Musa's large works are often executed using textile ink on printed textile, creatively blending the designs of the fabric with his own paintings. In his art, which he does not consider as 'African', Musa often appropriates classical Western masterpieces, such as The Gleaners by Jean-François Millet or Olympia by Édouard Manet. Confronting and mixing these classical images with later personalities such as Vincent van Gogh, Josephine Baker, Che Guevara or Osama bin Laden, Musa creates a critical view on Western art, politics and culture.

Furthermore, he has created mail art, calligraphy, engravings and has illustrated books.

== Exhibitions ==
Alongside gallery exhibitions, Musa's works have been shown at:

- 1977 FESTAC, Lagos, Nigeria
- 1985 Hungarian University of Fine Arts, Budapest, Hungary
- 1993 Sharjah Biennial, Sharjah, United Arab Emirates
- 1993 Musée bibliothèque Pierre André Benoit, Alès, France
- 1995 Whitechapel Art Gallery, London, UK
- 1996 Malmö Konsthall, Malmö, Sweden
- 1997 Venice Biennial, Venice, Italy
- 1998 Herbert F. Johnson Museum of Art, Ithaca, New York
- 2003 Arab World Institute, Paris, France
- 2004 Museum for African Art, New York City, USA
- 2004 Peabody Essex Museum, Salem, USA
- 2004 Museum Kunst Palast, Düsseldorf, Germany
- 2005 Centre de Cultura Contemporània de Barcelona, Barcelona, Spain
- 2005 Centre Georges Pompidou, Paris, France
- 2006 Museum of the African Diaspora, San Francisco, USA
- 2006 Mori Art Museum, Tokyo, Japan
- 2006 The Hayward, London, UK
- 2007 Johannesburg Art Gallery, Johannesburg, South Africa
- 2008 Musée d'Ixelles, Brussels, Belgium
- 2008 Hood Museum of Art, New Hampshire, USA
- 2009 San Diego Museum of Art, San Diego, USA
- 2011 Triennial of Contemporary Textile Arts of Tournai, Belgium
- 2011 Palace Museum of Ath, Belgium
- 2014 Gallery of African Art, London, UK
- 2014 Museum für Moderne Kunst (MMK), Frankfurt/Main

== See also ==
- Visual arts of Sudan
- Contemporary African art
