= Taiba, Gezira State =

Town in Sudan

Taiba, Gezira State طيبة
- Location in Sudan
- Coordinates: 14°29′00″N 33°26′00″E
- Country: Sudan
- State: Gezira State
- Time zone: Central Africa Time, GMT + 3

Taiba or Teiba (Arabic: طيبة) is a town in Gezira State, Sudan. The region has been a site of conflict, with heavy fighting reported at the Teiba military base, 6 kilometres (3.7 mi) south of Debibad, South Kordofan. The Sudanese Armed Forces (SAF) and the paramilitary Rapid Support Forces (RSF) have been involved in these conflicts.
