= Al Qoz District =

Al Qoz القوز
- District
- Country: Sudan
- State: South Kordofan

Area
  - Total: 2.618 km^{2} (1.011 sq mi)

Al Qoz also known as Al Quoz (Arabic: القوز) is a district of South Kordofan state, Sudan. Capital of Al Qoz district is Ed Dubeibat.

== History ==
Al Qoz district was the target of military operations due to the ongoing Sudanese Civil War and was besieged by the warring parties first in June 2023 and later in March 2025. On 8 May 2026, a Drone strike killed 26 people in Al Qoz locality.
