= Battle of En Nahud =

- Part of Kordofan Campaign (2023-present) of the Sudanese civil war (2023-present)
Date	Mar 21, 2025 - May 1, 2025
Location	En Nahud, West Kordofan, Sudan
Result	RSF victory: En Nahud looted by the RSF

Belligerents
(Sudan) Government of Peace and Unity; Rapid Support Forces	Republic of Sudan; Government of Sudan; Transitional Sovereignty Council; Sudanese Armed Forces

Commanders and leaders
Ali Al-Savanna	Unknown

Strength
500 vehicles 30 other armored vehicles	Unknown

Casualties and losses
- 319 civilians killed 37 injured

The Battle of En Nahud, occurred on 21 March 2025, was a military engagement between the RSF, who launched an offensive to seize the town and the SAF, in the strategic town of En Nahud in West Kordofan region. The battle ended RSF's victory, killing many civilians and looting the town.

== Battle ==
On Thursday, the first day of May, forces from Darfur, moved in 500 armed Thatcher vehicles, along with thirty service vehicles. There was contact and coordination between them and those with them in the city, known as “sleeper cells” and collaborators. When those inside heard the Rapid Support Forces firing, they put on the Rapid Support Forces’ military uniforms, took their weapons, and occupied the Khartoum Bank and the “municipality.” Then they went to the prison and released the prisoners, as they had done in Khartoum, to give them the opportunity to loot and plunder and to rest in the city. There were lists prepared in advance by the cells of scholars, university professors, dignitaries, and anyone with an Islamic orientation, so the RSF arrested them and executed them. They looted the markets and seized the goods loaded with food supplies, and they went to the house of the tribal chief of En Nahud and placed him under house arrest. The RSF had seized control of the town and the clashes between the two sides left 300 people dead, among them a doctor, a journalist, and a police officer. The city saw a looting from the RSF, during and after the seizure of the town, An Arabic source, had claimed that the town fell because of its own residents, stating that "En-Nuhud fell at the hands of its own sons who belonged to the Rapid Support Forces for many reasons, including financial and political ones."

== Aftermath ==
After the battle in a statement, the RSF said that its fighters had captured the town after a "heroic battle", and claiming that they have inflicted heavy casualties on the Sudanese government's forces, capturing military vehicles, equipment and seizing the 18th infantry division headquarters of the Sudanese government.

On 14 November, SAF advanced on the outskirts of the city.
