= Servaya =

Village in Sudan

- Village
- Country: Sudan
- State: South Kordofan
- Time zone: UTC+2 (CAT)

Servaya is a village in South Kordofan, Sudan.

== History ==
On 3 July 2023, the Sudan People's Liberation Movement–North (SPLM–N) seized control of the Sudanese Armed Forces (SAF) base in Servaya.
