= El Hadra =

Village in Sudan

- Village
- Country: Sudan
- State: South Kordofan
- Time zone: UTC+2 (CAT)

El Hadra is a village in South Kordofan, Sudan.

== History ==
On 14 March 2024, fourteen people, including 11 children and two teachers, were killed in an SAF airstrike on a school in El Hadra.
