= Kamenický Šenov =

- Town
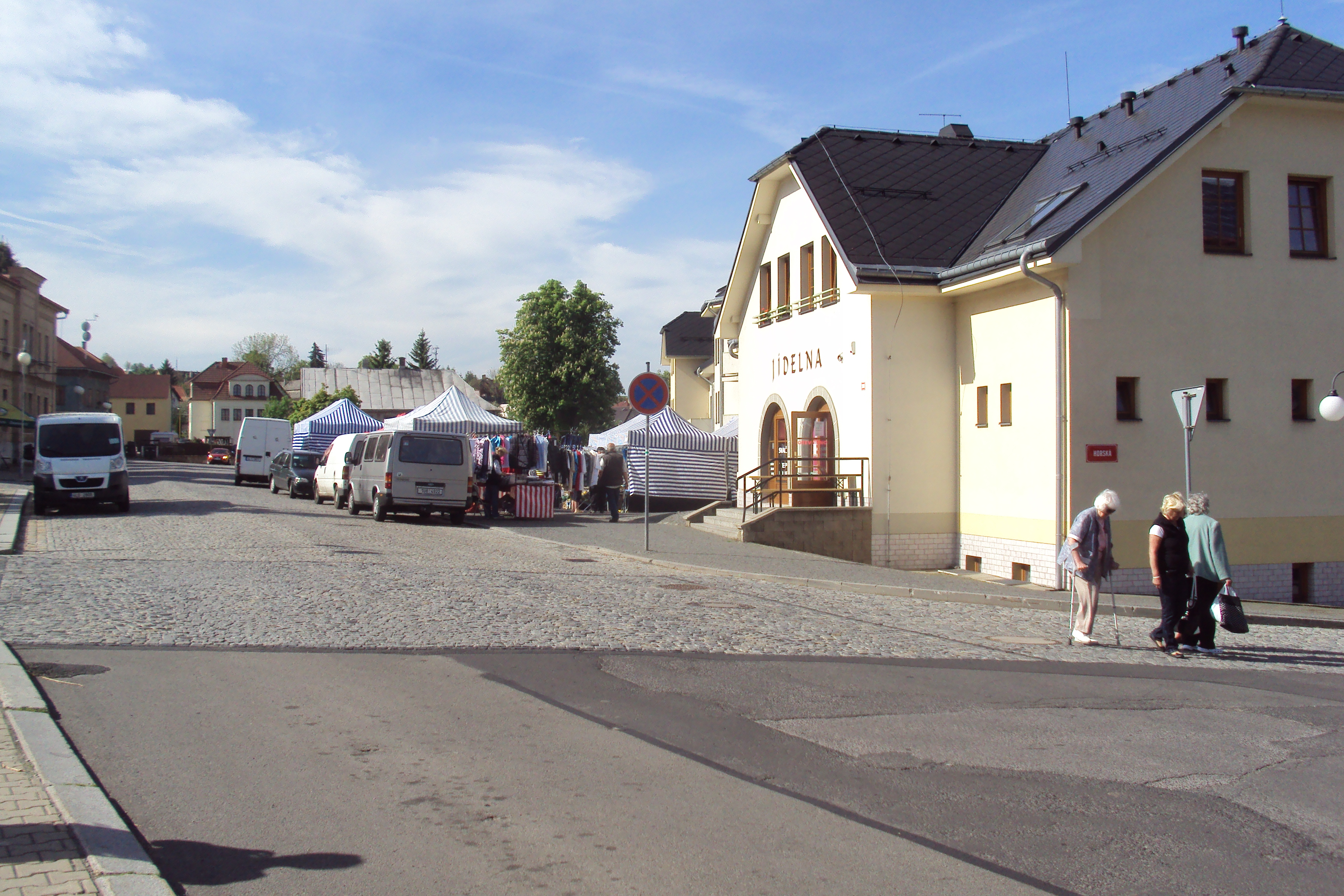
- T. G. Masaryka Square

- Flag Coat of arms

- Location in the Czech Republic
- Coordinates: 50°46′39″N 14°28′16″E
- Country: Czech Republic
- Region: Liberec
- District: Česká Lípa
- First mentioned: 1352

Government
  - Mayor: Martin Bártl

Area
  - Total: 10.47 km^{2} (4.04 sq mi)
- Elevation: 525 m (1,722 ft)

Population (2026-01-01)
  - Total: 3,791
  - Density: 362.1/km^{2} (937.8/sq mi)
- Time zone: UTC+1 (CET)
  - Summer (DST): UTC+2 (CEST)
- Postal code: 471 14
- Website: www.kamenicky-senov.cz

Kamenický Šenov (Czech pronunciation: [ˈkamɛɲɪtskiː ˈʃɛnof]; German: Steinschönau) is a town in Česká Lípa District in the Liberec Region of the Czech Republic. It has about 3,800 inhabitants. The town is located in the Central Bohemian Uplands.

From the 17th century to the present day, the history and development of Kamenický Šenov has been linked to glassmaking. There is a glassmaking school and a glassmaking museum in the town. The historic town centre is well preserved and is protected as an urban monument zone. The most popular landmark of the town is the basalt rock Panská skála.

== Administrative division ==
Kamenický Šenov consists of two municipal parts (in brackets population according to the 2021 census):

- Kamenický Šenov (3,389)
- Prácheň (407)

== Etymology ==
The German name Schönau and its Czech transcription Šenov are derived from the German word schön ('nice', 'lovely') and from the Middle High German word ouwe ('floodplain', 'wet meadow'). To distinguish it from places with the same name, the settlement was given the prefix Stein- in German ('stone'; referring to the nearby rocks) and Kamenický in Czech ('Kamenice's'; referring to the nearby town of Česká Kamenice).

== Geography ==
Kamenický Šenov is located about 10 kilometres (6 mi) north of Česká Lípa and 40 km (25 mi) west of Liberec. It lies in the Central Bohemian Uplands. The highest point is the hill Česká skála at 629 m (2,064 ft) above sea level. The stream Šenovský potok originates in the municipal territory and then flows through the town proper.

== History ==
The first written mention of Kamenický Šenov is from 1352, as a village called Sonov founded by immigrant Sorbs. The village belonged to the Česká Kamenice estate, therefore it began to be called Kamenický Šenov.

In the 17th century, the local glassmakers are first mentioned, and during the 17th and 18th centuries there was a massive boom in glass refining and in glass trade. The glass industry significantly contributed to the rapid growth of Kamenický Šenov and the inhabitants began to get rich.

== Demographics ==
Historical population

Year	Pop.	±%
1869	4,859	—
1880	5,593	+15.1%
1890	6,089	+8.9%
1900	6,122	+0.5%
1910	6,465	+5.6%

Year	Pop.	±%
1921	5,783	−10.5%
1930	6,619	+14.5%
1950	3,827	−42.2%
1961	3,959	+3.4%
1970	3,924	−0.9%

Year	Pop.	±%
1980	4,254	+8.4%
1991	4,088	−3.9%
2001	4,073	−0.4%
2011	3,935	−3.4%
2021	3,796	−3.5%

Source: Censuses

== Economy ==
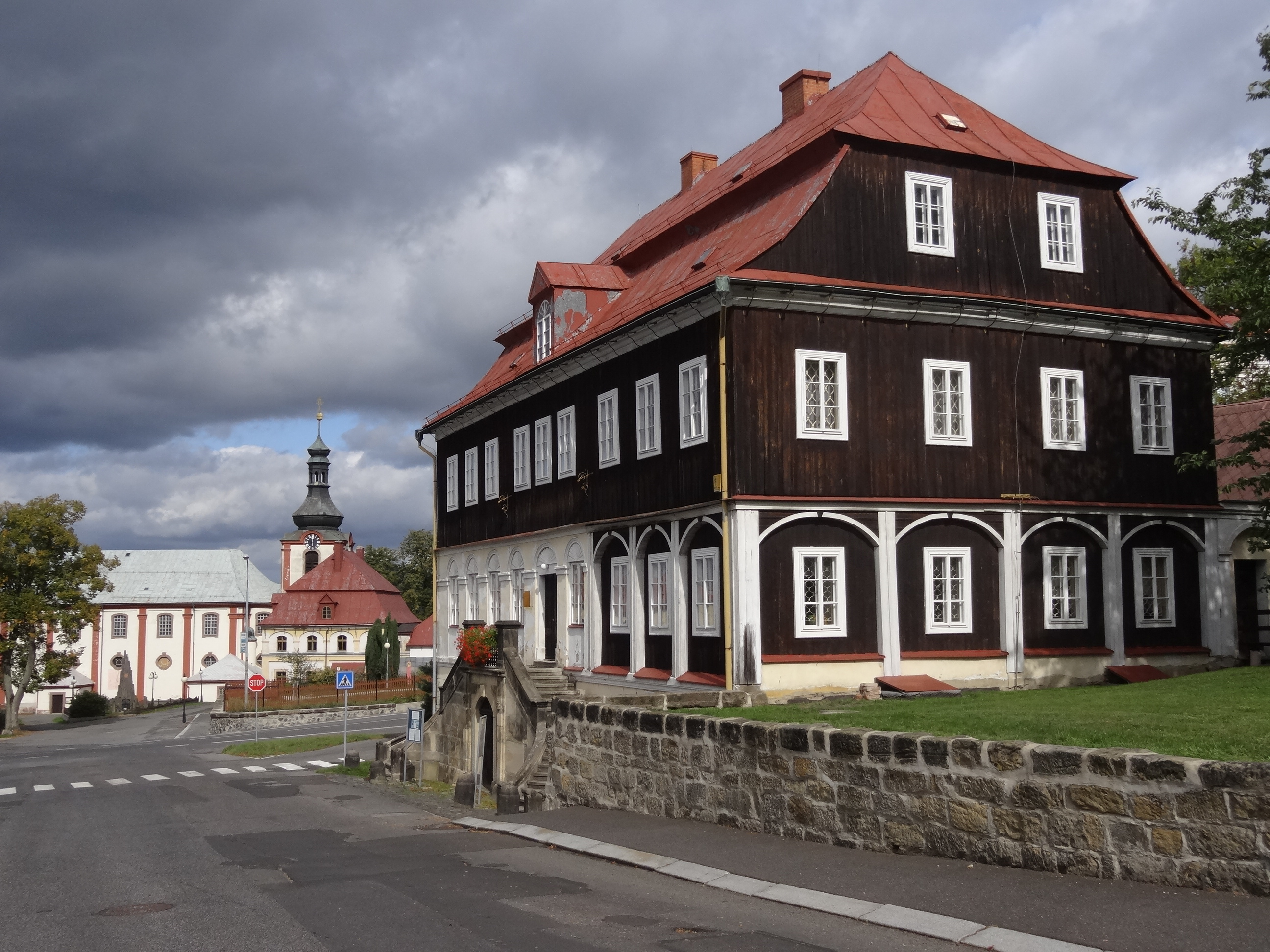
Glass Museum and Church of the Birth of Saint John the Baptist

The town has a long history of glass works. It is also known for the manufacture of chandeliers, operated by the Preciosa company.

== Transport ==
The I/13 road (part of the European route E442), which connects Liberec with Ústí nad Labem, runs through the town.

Kamenický Šenov is connected with Česká Kamenice by a short railway line. Historic trains run on it. It is only in operation during the summer tourist season and on weekends in some months out of season.

== Education ==
The Secondary Glassmaking School in Kamenický Šenov was founded in 1856 and is the oldest vocational school of its kind in the world.

== Sights ==
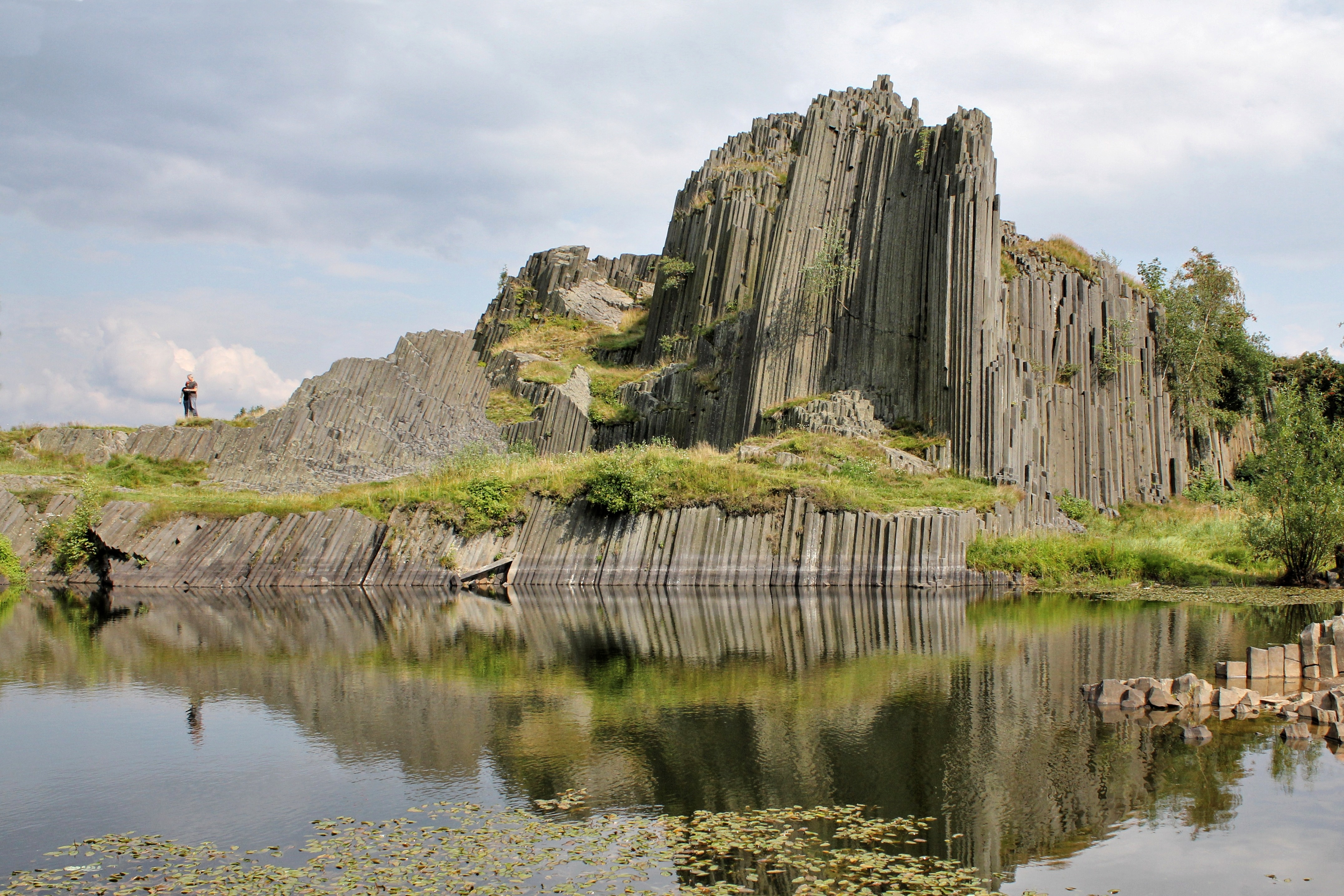
Panská skála

The historic town centre is well preserved and is protected as an urban monument zone. It consists of a medieval road network and large burgher houses from the turn of the 18th and 19th centuries. The main landmark of the town centre is the Church of the Birth of Saint John the Baptist. It is a Baroque building, built in 1715–1718.

The history of glass making in the town is presented in Glass Museum Kamenický Šenov. It is located in a historic house, built around 1770.

Panská skála is a national nature monument and a symbol of the town. It is a basalt rock, nicknamed "stone organ pipes". It is the most visited geological formation in the Czech Republic.

== Notable people ==
- Ignaz Pallme (1806–1877), German explorer
- Franz Bischoff (1864–1929), American artist

== Twin towns – sister cities ==
Kamenický Šenov is twinned with:

- Rheinbach, Germany
