= Ignaz Pallme =

Ignaz Samuel Pallme
- Born: 1 February 1806; Kamenický Šenov, Austrian Empire
- Died: 11 June 1877 (aged 71); Hainburg
- Occupations: Trade-facilitator, explorer, writer
- Known for: Exploring Egypt

Ignaz Samuel Pallme (1 February 1806 – 11 June 1877) was a German Bohemian explorer. He undertook a journey to Kordofan in 1837, on commission, for a mercantile establishment at Cairo, in the hope of discovering new channels of traffic with central Africa.

== Life ==
In the pursuit of his object, he sojourned (1837–1839) longer in the country than any European before him; the information he furnished respecting the state of this province of Egypt in particular, and of the Belled Soudan in general, may, therefore, be considered the most authentic in existence at that time. That few travellers have visited these countries before Pallme, and subjected the information they were enabled to collect to print, may be deduced from the facts, that scarcely one-half of the places mentioned in Pallme's book are to be found on the maps of that time.

The book Kordofan, written by Ignaz Pallme, is at the Austrian National Library in Vienna. Based on notes collected during Pallme's residence in Kordofan (Kurdufan), the book is embracing a description of that province of Egypt and of some of the bordering countries, with a review of the state of the commerce in those countries, of the habits and customs of the inhabitants, as also an account of the slave-hunts taking place under the government of Mehemet Ali.
