= Umm Dorein District =

Umm Dorein أم دورين
- District
- Interactive map of Umm Dorein
- Coordinates: 10°53′4″N 4°27′59″E
- Country: Sudan
- State: South Kordofan

Area
  - Total: 2,127 km^{2} (821 sq mi)

Umm Dorein, also known as Umm Durein (Arabic: أم دورين), is a district of South Kordofan state, Sudan.

== History ==
On March 21, 2024, during the Sudanese Civil War, the Sudanese Armed Forces (SAF) carried out a bombing, killing five civilians and injuring three. 560 families were displaced due to the attack.
