= Habila (South Kordofan) =

Habila حبيلة
- Location in Sudan
- Coordinates: 11.9504237139°N 30.0187445°E
- Country: Sudan
- State: Southern Kordofan
- District: Habilla District
- Time zone: UTC+2 (CAT)

Habila (Arabic: حبيلة) is a town in central Sudan, capital of the Habilla District.

== History ==
On 26 January 2026 The SAF retook Habila and broke the siege of Dalang. On March 1st, 2026, the road connecting Dalang and Habila was cut by the RSF.
