= En Nahud Airport =

Airport in Sudan

- IATA: NUD; ICAO: HSNH

Summary
- Airport type: Public
- Serves: En Nahud
- Elevation AMSL: 1,955 ft / 596 m
- Coordinates: 12°42′10″N 28°26′10″E

Map
- Location of the airport in Sudan

Runways
Direction	Length		Surface
Direction	ft	m	Surface
04/22	3,380	1,030	Dirt
- Source: Google Maps GCM

En Nahud Airport (IATA: NUD, ICAO: HSNH) is an airstrip serving the town of En Nahud in Sudan. The runway has housing encroaching its boundaries, and is subject to vehicle traffic.

== See also ==
- Transport in Sudan
- List of airports in Sudan
