= Al Buram District =

Al Buram البرام
- District
- Interactive map of Al Buram
- Coordinates: 10°37′1″N 29°56′41″E
- Country: Sudan
- State: South Kordofan

Area
  - Total: 1,754 km^{2} (677 sq mi)

Al Buram (Arabic: البرام) is a district of South Kordofan state, Sudan.
