= Habilla District =

Habilla هبيلة
- District
- Interactive map of Habilla
- Coordinates: 11°56′9″N 30°1′6″E
- Country: Sudan
- State: South Kordofan
- Seat: Habila

Area
  - Total: 6,096 km^{2} (2,354 sq mi)

Population (2008)
  - Total: 132,045
  - Density: 21.66/km^{2} (56.10/sq mi)

Habilla (Arabic: هبيلة) is a district of South Kordofan state, Sudan.

== History ==
In January 2025 during the Sudanese Civil War, the Rapid Support Forces (RSF) carried a multitude of attacks in Habilla district, leading to around 60.000 Internally Displaced Persons.
