= Keilak District =

Keilak
- District
- Country: Sudan
- State: West Kordofan

Population (2008)
  - Total: 42,666

Keilak also known as Kielak (Ar:كيلك) is a district of West Kordofan, Sudan.

== History ==
On 24 and 25 November 2024, an estimated 1,200 households were displaced Keilak Due to the ongoing Sudanese Civil War and clashes between the Sudanese Armed Forces (SAF) and the Rapid Support Forces (RSF). In February 2026 a fire in a refugee camp in Keilak killed one child and left more than 60 families homeless.
