= Reif Ashargi District =

Reif Ashargi الريف الشرقي
- District
- Interactive map of Reif Ashargi
- Coordinates: 11°19′55″N 29°40′44″E
- Country: Sudan
- State: South Kordofan

Area
  - Total: 2,618 km^{2} (1,011 sq mi)

Reif Ashargi (Arabic: الريف الشرقي) is a district of South Kordofan state, Sudan.

== History ==
In October 2011, during the Sudanese conflict in South Kordofan and Blue Nile SPLM-N reportedly controlled Reif Ashargi District.
