= Abu Jubaiyah District =

Abu Jubaiyah
- District
- Country: Sudan
- State: South Kordofan

Abu Jubaiyah is a district of South Kordofan state, Sudan.

== Towns ==
- Abu Jubeiha
