= Tina, Sudan =

Tina التينة
- Town
- Location in Sudan
- Coordinates: 15°0′49″N 22°48′55″E
- Country: Sudan
- State: North Darfur
- Control: Darfur Joint Protection Force
- Elevation: 2,952 ft (900 m)

Population (2015)
  - Total: 81,395
- Time zone: UTC+02:00 (CAT)

Tina or Al-Tina (Arabic: التينة) is a town in North Darfur, Sudan. The city is a twin town with Tinè, located across the border in Chad. The town was overrun with refugees in the War in Darfur and has seen heavy fighting in the recent Sudanese civil war.

== History ==
=== Darfur war ===
Tina has been a central border crossing point between Chad and Sudan. The city is divided between Tina in Sudan and Tinè in Chad. One of the first battles of Darfur war was conducted in Tina when members of the Sudanese Liberation Army (SLA) attacked government soldiers in the town capturing stocks of equipment.

During the Darfur war, Tine saw heavy fighting between the Janjaweed and the Justice and Equality Movement (JEM). Tina was an important refugee hub for people escaping the fighting, as it was the only open border crossing between Chad and Sudan. Most of the Darfur war Tina was controlled by JEM which supporter base the Kobe Zaghawa inhabited the town.

In October 2005 41 AMIS peacekeepers were abducted in the border town by The JEM

=== Sudanese civil war ===
Most of the Sudanese civil war the town was controlled by Darfur Joint Protection Force. In October 2025, hundreds of refugees fled the town of Kornoi for Tina. On 22 February 2026, Tina saw heavy clashes between the Rapid Support Forces (RSF) and the Sudanese Armed Forces (SAF). RSF captured the town, but lost the control of the town on the same day. On 19 March drone attack launched by the RSF hit Tine across the border in Chad. The strike killed 17 civilians and prompted Chad to shutdown all borders with Sudan.
