= Heiban District =

Heiban هيبان
- District
- Interactive map of Heiban
- Coordinates: 11°13′2″N 30°30′46″E
- Country: Sudan
- State: South Kordofan

Area
  - Total: 3,402 km^{2} (1,314 sq mi)

Heiban also known as Hayban (Arabic: هيبان) is a district of South Kordofan state, Sudan.

== History ==
During the Sudanese conflict in South Kordofan and Blue Nile Heiban district was controlled by the SPLM-N rebel group. On first of May 2016, The Sudanese Armed Forces (SAF) dropped bombs in Kauda, Heiban district, killing six children. On 16 May, bombed an elementary school in Kauda, wounding one Kenyan teacher. The governments of Norway, the UK, and the US condemned the bombing and other attacks on civilians.
