= Sowdari District =

Sowdari سودري
- District
- Country: Sudan
- State: North Kordofan

Area
  - Total: 81,581 km^{2} (31,499 sq mi)

Population (2008)
  - Total: 271,465
  - Density: 3.3276/km^{2} (8.6183/sq mi)

Sowdari or Sodri is a district of North Kordofan state, Sudan. Its population was 271,465 in 2008. The area of the district is 81,581 km^{2}.
