= Wad Banda =

Locality in Sudan

Wad Banda ود بندة
- Location in Sudan
- Coordinates: 13°5′35″N 27°56′36″E
- Country: Sudan
- State: West Kordofan
- Climate: Arid (BWh)
- Elevation: 532 m (1,745 ft)
- Time zone: Central Africa Time, GMT + 3

Wad Banda (Arabic: ود بندة) is a locality located in West Kordofan, Sudan.

== History ==
In April 2004, a rebel group from Darfur attacked a rural area in Wad Banda locality in the morning. The governor of Western Darfur reported that the attack resulted in the seizure of satellite phones and prompted an armed patrol from Wad Banda to pursue the rebels. A confrontation followed in a different region, leading to the armed forces eliminating several rebels, destroying vehicles, and recovering weapons.

In September 2007, rebels from Darfur, specifically the Justice and Equality Movement (JEM), conducted a bold raid deep into Sudan's Kordofan province, suggesting the Darfur conflict's potential expansion. The raid targeted a Sudanese military base at Wad Banda, resulting in the seizure of weapons and police vehicles, and killing 41 policemen. This incident followed a previous attack on a garrison guarding Darfur's rail link to Khartoum. The Sudanese government responded by portraying the attack as an external threat and emphasized the need for unity to counter perceived international conspiracies. While rebel claims pointed to Wad Banda being a supply depot for government attacks on civilians in Darfur, they also highlighted ongoing civilian-targeted airstrikes using Sudanese MiG-29s and Antonov bombers, in violation of a UN Security Council resolution.

In December 2011 during the Sudanese conflict in South Kordofan and Blue Nile between the Sudanese Armed Forces (SAF) and the Sudan Revolutionary Front (SRF), on 25 December, JEM leader Khalil Ibrahim (part of SRF) was intercepted and killed along with 30 of his fighters west of Wad Banda. Sudanese state media reported Ibrahim was defeated in fighting with the army. JEM confirmed Ibrahim's death, but said he had been killed by an airstrike, not in combat with Sudanese ground troops. Ibrahim's death came one day after JEM fighters struck three villages in the state.

In March 2015, tribal clashes in Wad Banda locality between the Shanabla and Gemesat tribes resulted in injuries to several people. An intervening police officer lost his life. The conflict prompted police intervention, and escalated to gunfire against the police. Authorities sent a significant military force to separate the combatants in the Um Girenat area.

In October 2022, demonstrators belonging to the Hamar tribe allegedly ended their road blockade connecting El Obeid in North Kordofan and El Fasher in North Darfur. This occurred in the localities of El Khoei, El Nehoud, and Wad Banda in West Kordofan. They granted authorities a ten-day period to meet their request for establishing a new state known as 'Central Kordofan.'

During the 2023 Sudan conflict, on 25 April, Wad Banda witness clashes between the SAF and Rapid Support Forces (RSF), and the RSF was reported to have taken Wad Banda.
