= The Fashion (website) =

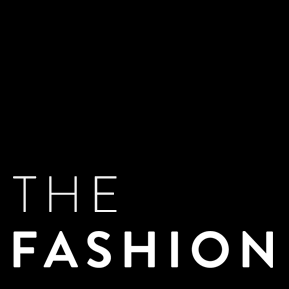
- Industry: Fashion
- Founded: 2013
- Founder: Ida Adler Olsen; Troels Knak-Nielsen; Kasper Vardrup
- Defunct: 2016
- Key people: Kasper Vardup, CEO
- Website: thefashion.com

The Fashion was a website and discovery platform that existed from 2013 to 2016. It aggregated a multitude of fashion sites into one interface. Its aim was to provide users a streamlined shopping experience. The Fashion maintained localized sites for users in the United Kingdom, United States and Denmark, and offered a selection from over 150 online shops with 1,000 brands. The company was headquartered in London and Copenhagen. Co-founder Kasper Vardup served as its CEO.

== History ==
The Fashion was founded in 2013 by serial entrepreneurs Ida Adler-Olsen, Kasper Vardup, and Troels Knak-Nielsen. Olsen was previously a project manager at the Copenhagen School of Entrepreneurship and a partner at Echo.it, an enterprise social network startup. Vardup previously founded phone recycling company GreenWire and business incubator Startup Bootcamp. He is also a partner at venture capital firm Rainmaking. Knak-Nielsen previously worked with Vardup as chief technology officer at GreenWire.

The Fashion received $400,000 in angel investment from Rainmaking and angel investor Kristian Byrge in 2013. The site officially launched in the United Kingdom, United States, and Denmark in May 2014. In November of that year The Fashion closed a $1.7 million seed funding round led North East Venture Capital and the Danish Growth Fund. The funding round was intended to help the site expand into Sweden, Germany and the Netherlands.

In 2016, its website announced that The Fashion had gone out of business, writing "We're sorry, but we've turned off the lights. It was three years of great fun and fashion, but no good thing lasts for ever."

== Website and business model ==
The Fashion aggregated information from various fashion websites and online stores to allow consumers an overview of available clothing and accessories and compare prices without visiting individual retailers’ sites. The site also updates in real time information from retailers such as price or amount of items in stock. After a consumer selected an item they wish to purchase, The Fashion redirected the user to the retailer's website where they can finalize their purchase. The site was paid a percentage of the total sales price of each sale made by the retailer.

The site maintained localized websites for users in the United Kingdom, United States, and Denmark. It used algorithms and machine learning technology to tailor to individual users content such as the type of fashion products or styles displayed by the site. Users could filter displayed items by designer, brand, color, size, and price. The Fashion curated fashion trends and updates on a weekly basis for its userbase.
