= Abu Jubeiha =

Town in Sudan

- Town
- Country: Sudan
- State: South Kordofan
- District: Abu Jubaiyah District
- Time zone: UTC+2 (CAT)

Abu Jubeiha is a town in South Kordofan, Sudan.

== History ==
On 5 June 2026, there were reports of Rapid Support Forces (RSF) drone strikes on SAF positions on Abu Jubeiha.
