= Ghubaysh District =

Ghubaysh
- District
- Interactive map of Ghubaysh
- Country: Sudan
- State: West Kordofan

Ghubaysh or Ghabesh (Ar:غبيش) is a district of West Kordofan state, Sudan.

== History ==
In December 2004, During War in Darfur, Sudanese Liberation Army (SLA) attacked three convoys of trucks carrying more than 1,3 million tons of food in Ghubaysh. The attacks led to World Food Programme suspending food convoys in Darfur momentarily. The UN Special Representative to Sudan, Jan Pronk called for the immediate return of the vehicles.

In March 2026, During the Sudanese Civil War, Rapid Support Forces (RSF) drone strike struck a restaurant in Ghubaysh. The strike killed 28 and injured 23 civilians.
