= Hussein Barsham =

Sudanese military official

Hussein Barsham is a Sudanese field commander of the Rapid Support Forces (RSF).

Barsham is a member of the Messiria people. On Monday 30 October 2023 Barsham was in command of a group of RSF soldiers who captured Baleela airport in West Kordofan. Barsham was reportedly lightly injured in fighting with members of the Sudanese Armed Forces near Umm Ruwaba or Ghabsha, North Kordofan in December 2024. The tribal leader of the Al Bazaa tribe subsequently put down a reward for the death of Barsham. In late December 2024 Barsham's actions at Baleela airport were part of an investigation by journalists of The New York Times looking intro atrocities committed during the Sudanese civil war (2023–present).

On 18 July 2025, Barsham was sanctioned by the European Union, which determined that he enganged in "operations that have resulted in mass atrocities, including targeted killings, ethnic violence, forced displacement and violence against civilians, particularly in Darfur and other conflict-affected regions of Sudan"

In late 2025 colonel Barsham was reportedly injured in a drone strike in Lagawa District, South Kordan, which killed RSF major general Hashim Didan.

On 5 February 2026 Barsham was sanctioned by the United Kingdom for mass atrocities. He was also sanctioned by Australia on 5 November 2026.
