= Saraf Omra =

Town in Sudan

Saraf Omra سرف عمرة
- Location in Sudan
- Coordinates: 13°28′31″N 23°18′20″E
- Country: Sudan
- State: North Darfur
- Control: Rapid Support Forces

Population
  - Total: 200,000

Saraf Omra (Arabic: سرف عمرة) is a town in North Darfur, Sudan. It is second in population size only to El Fasher.

== History ==
Saraf Omra has been heavily affected by the ongoing Sudanese civil war. In November 2024, massacres were reported in the town. On 19 October 2025, seven people were killed in a Sudanese Armed Forces (SAF) drone strike on the main market of Saraf Omra. On 25 March 2026, a drone strike in Rapid Support Forces (RSF) controlled Saraf Omra killed 22 people and injured 17 people.

== Demographics ==
Saraf Omra has approximately 200,000 residents.
