= Kornoi =

Village in Sudan

- Town
- Location within Sudan
- Country: Sudan
- State: North Darfur
- Time zone: UTC+2 (CAT)

Kornoi or Karnoi is a town in North Darfur, Sudan.

== History ==
Kornoi has been affected by the Sudanese civil war. In August 2025, a senior Zaghawa traditional leader was abducted in the town. In October 2025, hundreds of refugees fled the town for Tina at the Chad–Sudan border. On 3 November 2025, it was reported that a Rapid Support Forces (RSF) drone strike on a hospital in Kornoi, left multiple casualties and forced the withdrawal of Médecins Sans Frontières from the parts of the state. On 25 December 2025, The RSF claimed to have taken Kornoi, which was denied by the JDF. On 13 May 2026, a drone struck a local market and civilian vehicles.
