= Tandalti =

Town in Sudan

Tandalti تندلتي Tendelti
- Town
- Location of Tandalti in Sudan
- Coordinates: 13°0′56″N 31°52′8″E
- Country: Sudan
- State: White Nile
- Time zone: UTC+2 (CAT)

Tandalti (Arabic: تندلتي), or Tendelti, is a small town in White Nile State, Central Sudan. Tendelti is an administrative Locality in the White Nile State and it is on the borders Between White Nile State and Northern Kordofan State.

Tendelti has a population of almost 750,000 people mostly from Arab tribes.

== Transport ==
It is served by a station that lies in the main road between Khartoum and Western Sudan, where the road passes Tendelti from Kosti to Um Rawaba in Northern Kordofan. Also, Tendelti is a conjunction of roads that connecting the northern part of the locality and the transportation from El Dewaim and Khartoum at the Western Bank of White Nile.

== Manufacturing ==
The first ice cream factory (Loli) was opened in Tendelti in 1983.

== Sudanese civil war ==
During the Sudanese civil war (2023-present), the SAF repelled RSF drone attacks in July 2026 on the town.

== See also ==
- Railway stations in Sudan
