= Khamasat =

Town in Sudan

- Village
- Country: Sudan
- State: West Kordofan
- District: En Nuhud District
- Time zone: UTC+2 (CAT)

Khamasat is a village in West Kordofan, Sudan.

== History ==
On 15 November 2026, Sudanese Armed Forces (SAF) captured the village from the Rapid Support Forces (RSF).
