= Tinè =

Town in Chad

- Town
- Location within Chad
- Coordinates: 15.02797°N 22.79656°E
- Country: Chad
- Province: Wadi Fira
- Time zone: UTC+01:00 (WAT)

Tinè, also known as Tiné or Tina, is a town in the Wadi Fira region of eastern Chad, located near the Chad–Sudan border. The town is approximately 60 kilometres (37 mi) southeast of Iriba by air. It contains a Grand Central Market, the Atik Mosque and a hospital.

== History ==
The Sudanese civil war has spilled over into neighbouring Chad. There have been reports of hundreds of Sudanese refugees in the area. As a border town it has seen an influx of refugees. The refugee camp is located around 111 miles north of Adré, and has 46,000 refugees from Northern Darfur. The camp is run by the United Nations High Commissioner for Refugees. In February 2026, five Chadian soldiers were killed in clashes with the paramilitary Rapid Support Forces (RSF). As a result the border was closed by the authorities. On 18 March 2026, a drone that originated from Sudan hit the town, killing 17 people. President Mahamat Déby ordered the military to retaliate against future attacks from Sudan.

== Twin towns ==
- Tina, Sudan
