= El Abassiya District =

El Abassiya العباسية
- District
- Interactive map of El Abassiya
- Coordinates: 12°9′46″N 31°18′9″E
- Country: Sudan
- State: South Kordofan

Area
  - Total: 4,231 km^{2} (1,634 sq mi)

El Abassiya or just Abassiya (Arabic: العباسية) is a district of South Kordofan state, Sudan.

== History ==
On 16 September 2016, a student was shot by a pro-government militia in El Abassiya. On 24 November 2025, during the Sudanese Civil War, 645 families were displaced in Abassiya.
