= Ed Dubeibat =

Ed Dubeibat الدبيبات
- Town
- Location within Sudan
- Coordinates: 12°31′N 29°48′E
- State: White Nile State

Area
  - Urban: 9,824 km^{2} (3,793 sq mi)
- Elevation: 380 m (1,250 ft)
- Time zone: UTC+3
- Area code: 613(249+)

Ed Dubeibat, also spelled El Dubaybat, Dibebad, or Debibad (Arabic: الدبيبات) is a town located in the state of South Kordofan in Sudan at an altitude of 380 meters above sea level (1246 feet). It lies at a distance of 56 kilometres (35 mi) north of Dalang, 700 kilometers (430 miles) south of the capital Khartoum, and 186 kilometers (116 miles) from Kadugli, capital of the state, and about 100 kilometers (62 miles), from El Obeid, the largest city in the states of Kordofan.

It has been a site of conflict, with the Sudanese Armed Forces (SAF) and the Rapid Support Forces (RSF) involved in heavy fighting.

== Etymology ==
The word dubeibat in Arabic is a plural of dubeiba, which is a diminutive of dabba, meaning a hummock or a flat small hill. Thus, Dubaybat means the small hummocks.

== Sudanese civil war ==
During the war in Sudan which started on 15 April 2023 and in June 2023, the town of Debibad was raided by paramilitaries of the RSF and by large groups of gunmen on subsequent days. The entire town was plundered, and three women were raped. On June 22, 2023, heavy fighting took place between the SAF and the paramilitary RSF at the Teiba military base, 6 kilometres (3.7 mi) south of Debibad. The battle resulted in the loss of approximately 40 army personnel, four paramilitaries of the RSF, and numerous injuries on both sides. The RSF reportedly conducted a victory parade inside Debibad, in a "display of triumph".

On 8 January 2024, SAF warplanes attacked RSF positions in Dibebad.

The road between Delling and Kadugli, the capital of South Kordofan, is still closed due to security reasons. This has led to long lines of vehicles in Delling, waiting to continue to other places in the state or to the South Sudanese border.

On 23 May 2025, the SAF and its allies announced the capture of Dibebad.

== Topography ==
The name of the town reflects its topographic feature where Dunes and small separated flat hills dominate the general appearance of the earth's surface.

== Transportation hub ==
Owing to its geographical location Ed Dubeibat, is considered as an important transportation hub in the region connecting South Kordofan to the rest of Sudan with a network of roads and railway.

=== Paved roads ===
- Ad Dubeibat - Abu Zabad - Fula
- Ad Dubeibat - Dalang - Kadugli
- Ad Dubeibat - Khartoum (via Kosti)
- Ad Dubeibat - Nyala (Sudan)
- Ad Dubeibat – Al-Ubayyid

== Economy ==
A Dubeibat is known for its animal production. It is a big market for trading in camels. corps such as Groundnuts, sesame and Sorghum are also cultivated in the area for consumption.

== Medical care ==
There is one hospital, Rural Dubeibat Hospital.

== The problem of water scarcity ==
The city suffers from water scarcity despite its proximity to the areas of Mechanized Rain Farming in South Kordofan, and being located on a groundwater basin. Continuous efforts have been made to resolve this problem. The Aldbebat Water Project was launched in 2012 The total cost of the first phase of the project accounts for 700 thousand Sudanese pounds to finance the drilling of three water wells, including the building of water pipeline 5 kilometers long, and the construction of water treatment plant in the villages of Nabq and Alajurh.

== Education ==
The Government of Japan has contributed to the funding of basic education in the local communities in 2007, with a contribution of about U.S. $172 441

== Notable people ==
- Abdalla Hamdok, former prime minister of Sudan
