= Umm Sumeima =

- Location in Sudan
- Coordinates: 13°8′50.04″N 29°37′51.12″E
- Country: Sudan

Umm Sumeima is a Sudanese town in North Kordofan. It is roughly 10km from the border of West Kordofan.

During the Sudanese civil war (2023–present), Umm Sumeima was captured by the Rapid Support Forces on 30 July 2025. The Sudanese Armed Forces recaptured the town on 5 November 2026.
