= Fashfoun =

Village in Sudan

- Village
- Country: Sudan
- State: Blue Nile State
- Time zone: UTC+2 (CAT)

Fashfoun is a village in Blue Nile State, Sudan.

== History ==
Fashfoun has been affected by the Sudanese civil war. On 14 July 2026, the Sudanese Armed Forces (SAF) announced that its 4th Infantry Division's 13th Brigade and its Special Operations unit had recaptured Fashfoun from the Rapid Support Forces (RSF) and SPLM-N (al-Hilu).

== See also ==
- List of cities in Sudan
