= Al Sunut District =

Al Sunut
- District
- Country: Sudan
- State: West Kordofan

Al Sunut (Arabic: السنوت) is a district of West Kordofan, Sudan.

== History ==
On 15 and 16 February 2026, during the Sudanese Civil War, an alleged Sudanese Armed Forces (SAF) drone struck an IDP shelter in Al Sunut killing 26 civilians of which 15 were children. On 27 March 2025, rebel group SPLM-N reported than SAF drone strike hit a funeral gathering and killed 7 civilians and injured 39 in Al Sunut.
