= En Nahud =

En Nahud النهود
- Town
- Location in Sudan (North Kurdufan state highlighted)
- Coordinates: 12°41′33″N 28°25′24″E
- Country: Sudan
- State: West Kurdufan
- District: En Nuhud District
- Control: Rapid Support Forces

En Nahud (Arabic: النهود) is a town in the desert of central Sudan. It is located within the En Nuhud District in the state of West Kordofan.

== History ==
In 2021, the Darsaya gold mine in the town collapsed, leading to the deaths of at least 38 people.

During the Sudanese civil war (2023–present), the town was taken by the Rapid Support Forces on 1 May 2025.

== Notable residents ==
- Hassan Musa

== Geography ==
=== Climate ===
En Nahud has a hot desert climate (Köppen climate classification BWh) characterized by consistently high temperatures. Temperatures are coolest in December and January and are hottest from April to June. A wet season lasts from June to September with moderate rainfall and relatively high humidity. The period from November to April is almost completely dry, with very low humidity.

Climate data for En Nahud (1991–2020, extremes 1911–present)
Month	Jan	Feb	Mar	Apr	May	Jun	Jul	Aug	Sep	Oct	Nov	Dec	Year
Record high °C (°F)	43.0 (109.4)	43.5 (110.3)	45.2 (113.4)	45.5 (113.9)	47.6 (117.7)	46.3 (115.3)	41.5 (106.7)	45.2 (113.4)	45.0 (113.0)	42.0 (107.6)	41.5 (106.7)	39.8 (103.6)	47.6 (117.7)
Mean daily maximum °C (°F)	31.3 (88.3)	33.9 (93.0)	37.4 (99.3)	40.2 (104.4)	40.2 (104.4)	38.3 (100.9)	34.4 (93.9)	33.1 (91.6)	34.9 (94.8)	37.1 (98.8)	35.4 (95.7)	32.2 (90.0)	35.7 (96.3)
Daily mean °C (°F)	22.8 (73.0)	25.1 (77.2)	28.7 (83.7)	31.6 (88.9)	32.5 (90.5)	31.7 (89.1)	29.0 (84.2)	28.0 (82.4)	28.9 (84.0)	29.8 (85.6)	27.2 (81.0)	23.7 (74.7)	28.2 (82.8)
Mean daily minimum °C (°F)	14.3 (57.7)	16.2 (61.2)	19.9 (67.8)	22.9 (73.2)	24.7 (76.5)	25.0 (77.0)	23.6 (74.5)	22.9 (73.2)	22.9 (73.2)	22.5 (72.5)	18.9 (66.0)	15.1 (59.2)	20.8 (69.4)
Record low °C (°F)	4.0 (39.2)	6.5 (43.7)	10.2 (50.4)	11.0 (51.8)	16.4 (61.5)	14.6 (58.3)	17.0 (62.6)	18.0 (64.4)	18.0 (64.4)	12.9 (55.2)	7.3 (45.1)	6.4 (43.5)	4.0 (39.2)
Average precipitation mm (inches)	0.0 (0.0)	0.0 (0.0)	0.0 (0.0)	2.0 (0.08)	18.0 (0.71)	45.7 (1.80)	101.9 (4.01)	116.1 (4.57)	66.4 (2.61)	25.7 (1.01)	0.1 (0.00)	0.0 (0.0)	375.9 (14.80)
Average precipitation days (≥ 1.0 mm)	0.0	0.0	0.0	0.3	2.0	4.8	7.5	9.2	6.7	2.6	0.0	0.0	33.1
Average relative humidity (%)	22	16	15	16	30	45	59	68	62	41	24	24	35
Mean monthly sunshine hours	303.8	268.8	282.1	276.0	263.5	255.0	217.0	201.5	231.0	272.8	300.0	303.8	3,175.3
Source 1: NOAA
Source 2: Meteo Climat (record highs and lows)

== Transportation ==
It is served by En Nahud Airport.
