= South Kordofan =

State of Sudan

South Kordofan جنوب كردفان Ǧanūb Kurdufān
- State
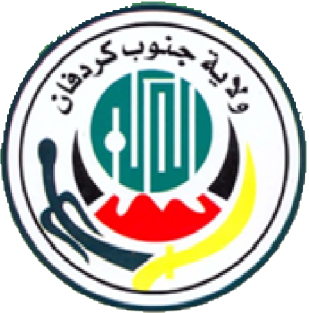
- Seal

- Coordinates: 11°8′N 29°53′E
- Country: Sudan
- Region: Nuba Mountains
- Capital: Kaduqli

Government
  - Governor: Hamed al-Bashir Ibrahim

Area
  - Total: 79,470 km^{2} (30,680 sq mi)

Population (2018)
  - Total: 2,107,623
- Time zone: UTC+2 (CAT)
- HDI (2017): 0.431 low

South Kordofan (Arabic: جنوب كردفان Ǧanūb Kurdufān) is one of the 18 wilayat or states of Sudan. It borders North Kordofan to the north, West Kordofan to the west, South Sudan to the south and east, and White Nile to the northeast. It has an area of 158,355 km^{2} and an estimated population of approximately 2,107,623 people (2018 est). Kaduqli is the capital of the state. It is centered on the Nuba Mountains. At one time it was supposed that South Kordofan was the only state in (North) Sudan suitable for producing oil, but oil has also been discovered in neighboring White Nile State in larger quantities.

== History ==
Although South Kordofan is part of Sudan, it is home to many pro-South Sudan communities, especially in the Nuba Mountains, some of whom fought alongside southern rebels during the long civil war.

In 2009 and 2010, a series of conflicts between rival nomadic tribes in South Kordofan caused a large number of casualties and displaced thousands.

On June 6, 2011, An armed conflict broke out between the forces of Northern and Southern Sudan, ahead of the scheduled independence of the South on July 9. This followed an agreement for both sides to withdraw from Abyei. On June 20, the parties agreed to demilitarize the contested area of Abyei where Ethiopian peacekeepers were deployed. Abyei is currently controlled by the United Nations Interim Security Force for Abyei.. Under the Comprehensive Peace Agreement, residents of South Kordofan were to hold popular consultations in 2011 to determine the constitutional future of the state. However, South Kordofan governor Ahmed Haroun suspended the process, and violence followed. Haroun had previously been charged with war crimes against civilians and crime against humanity by the International Criminal Court.

== Districts of Southern Kordofan ==
1. Dilling District
2. Rashad District
3. Abu Jubaiyah District
4. Talodi District
5. Kadugli District
6. Al Qoz District
7. Habilla District
8. Reif Ashargi District
9. Heiban District
10. Umm Dorein District
11. Al Buram District
12. El Abassiya District

== Settlements ==
Cities, towns and villages of Southern Kordofan include:

- Ed Dubeibat
- Kaduqli (capital)
- Mabsouta
- Um Dehilib
- Al Sunut District
- El Hadra
- Servaya
- Abu Jubeiha

== See also ==
- Kordofan - overall region
- Eyes and Ears Of God – Video surveillance of Sudan - documentary film
- Nuba Mountains
- Languages of the Nuba Mountains
- Ghulfan people
