= En Nuhud District =

En Nuhud
- District
- Interactive map of En Nuhud
- Country: Sudan
- State: West Kordofan

En Nuhud is a district of West Kordofan state, Sudan.

== Towns ==
- En Nahud
