= Kordofan =

Former province of Sudan

Coordinates: 13°N 28°E

Kordofan كردفان (Arabic)
- Province of Sudan
- 1898–1994
- Flag

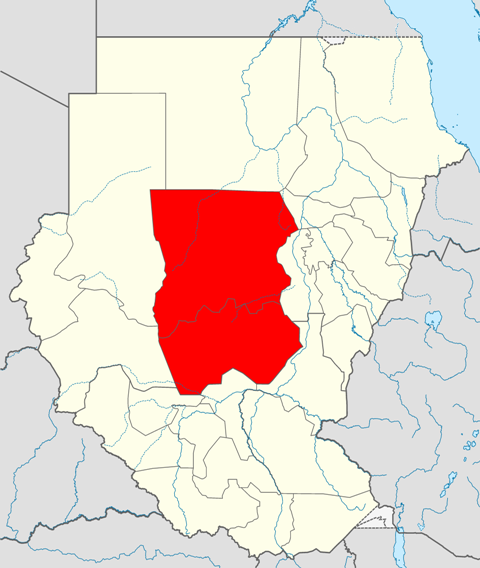
- Location of Kordofan in Sudan
- Capital: El-Obeid
- Area
  - 2018: 376,145 km^{2} (145,230 sq mi)
- Population
  - 2018: 6,602,057
- History
  - Established: 1898
  - Disestablished: 1994
Succeeded by
North Kordofan
South Kordofan
West Kordofan
- Today part of: Sudan

Kordofan (Arabic: كردفان Kurdufān) is a region in Central Sudan and a former province of central Sudan. In 1994 it was divided into three new federal states: North Kordofan, South Kordofan and West Kordofan. In August 2005, West Kordofan State was abolished and its territory divided between North and South Kordofan States, as part of the implementation of the Comprehensive Peace Agreement between the Government of Sudan and the Sudan People's Liberation Movement. West Kordofan was reestablished in July 2013.

== Geography ==
Kordofan covers an area of some 376,145 km^{2} (146,932 miles²), with an estimated population in 2000 of 3.6 million (3 million in 1983). It is largely an undulating plain, with the Nuba Mountains in the southeast quarter. During the rainy season from June to September, the area is fertile, but in the dry season, it is virtually desert. The region's chief town is El Obeid.

== Early history, economy, and demography ==
Traditionally the area is known for production of gum arabic. Other crops include groundnuts, cotton and millet. Originally Kordofan was inhabited by the indigenous brown-skinned-Nubian-speaking peoples, and the region's name may be derived from the Nubian word Kurta meaning 'man'. In Antiquity, Kordofan was part of the Kingdom of Kush. In the Middle Ages, the area had been part of the Nubian kingdoms of Alodia and Makuria. By the 14th century, Arabs from Egypt began expanding southwards into Kordofan, amalgamating with some of the indigenous population and driving remnants of the indigenous population to the hills. Most of the inhabitants of Kordofan are Arabs. The main tribal groups of Arab tribes, include the Dar Hamid, Kawahla, Hamar, Bedairiah, Gawamaah and Rekabeiah. In Northern Kordofan there are large grazing areas used and inhabited for hundreds of years by Arabic-speaking, semi-nomadic Baggara and camel-raising Kababish tribes. Other ethnic groups that inhabit Kordofan are Nubians, Daju, Beja, Zaghawa, and Funj people. Nilotic tribes, Nuba, Shilluk and Dinka, also inhabit parts of Kordofan.

The Kordofanian languages are spoken by a significant number of people in southern Kordofan and are unique to the region, as are the Kadu languages, but Arabic is the main and most widely spoken language in the greater Kordofan region.

== History ==
=== Before 1840 ===
Over the previous centuries Kordofan had largely escaped control by any one of the region's major states, though the Funj Sultanate centred in Sennar projected influence over eastern Kordofan via the Ghudiyat. In 1734 Isawi of the Musabba'at (an exiled faction of Darfur's royal family) had dislodged the Ghudiyat administration and repelled subsequent Funj attempts to regain their foothold Kordofan, but after Isawi's death Kordofan was conquered by Abu Likaylik during his rise to power in Sennar. Around 1772 Hashim of the Musabba'at led an insurgency which retook control of Kordofan from the aging Likaylik, whose successor in Sennar abandoned attempts to recapture it. Hashim began building a state in central Kordofan, but in 1780 the Funj ousted him, and together with his followers (which included the Danaqla, Shaiqiyya, Kababish, and Rizayqat) they began raiding Darfur.

Kordofan remained for about five years under the government of Sennar. There followed a considerable immigration of Arab tribes and native people from Sennar and Dongola (see old Dongola) into the country. The Sennari however suffered a decisive defeat in 1784 and thereafter under Darfur viceroys the country enjoyed prosperity. The inhabitants lived in peace and were not troubled with taxes; the merchants were exempt from duties, and the tribute paid was a voluntary present to the Sultan of Darfur. Bara, the second commercial town of importance in the country, was built by the Dongolavi. Commerce extended in all directions. Caravans brought products from Abyssinia and Egypt into Lobeid and Bara, from which the greater part was again transported on to other parts of Africa. This prosperity ended in 1821 when Muhammad Ali Pasha, Ottoman Viceroy of Egypt sent his son-in-law, Mahommed Bey the Defturdar, with about 4,500 soldiers and eight pieces of artillery, to subject Kordofan to his power. The monopoly enjoyed by the Egyptian governors in Kordofan impeded trade and stifled entrepreneurial activities.

From 1837 to 1839, the country was explored by Ignaz Pallme.

=== After 1840 ===
Kordofan in the 1850s
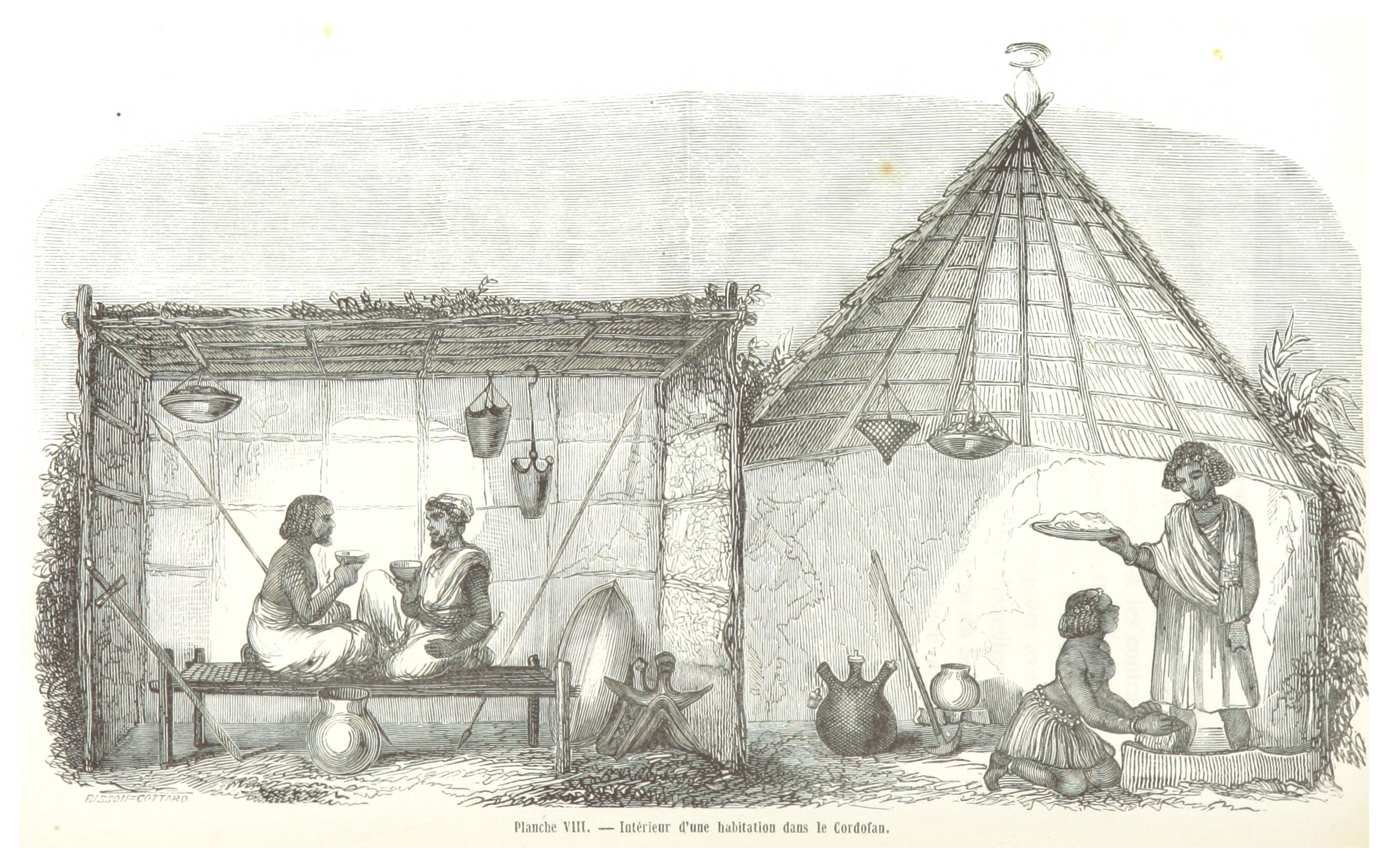

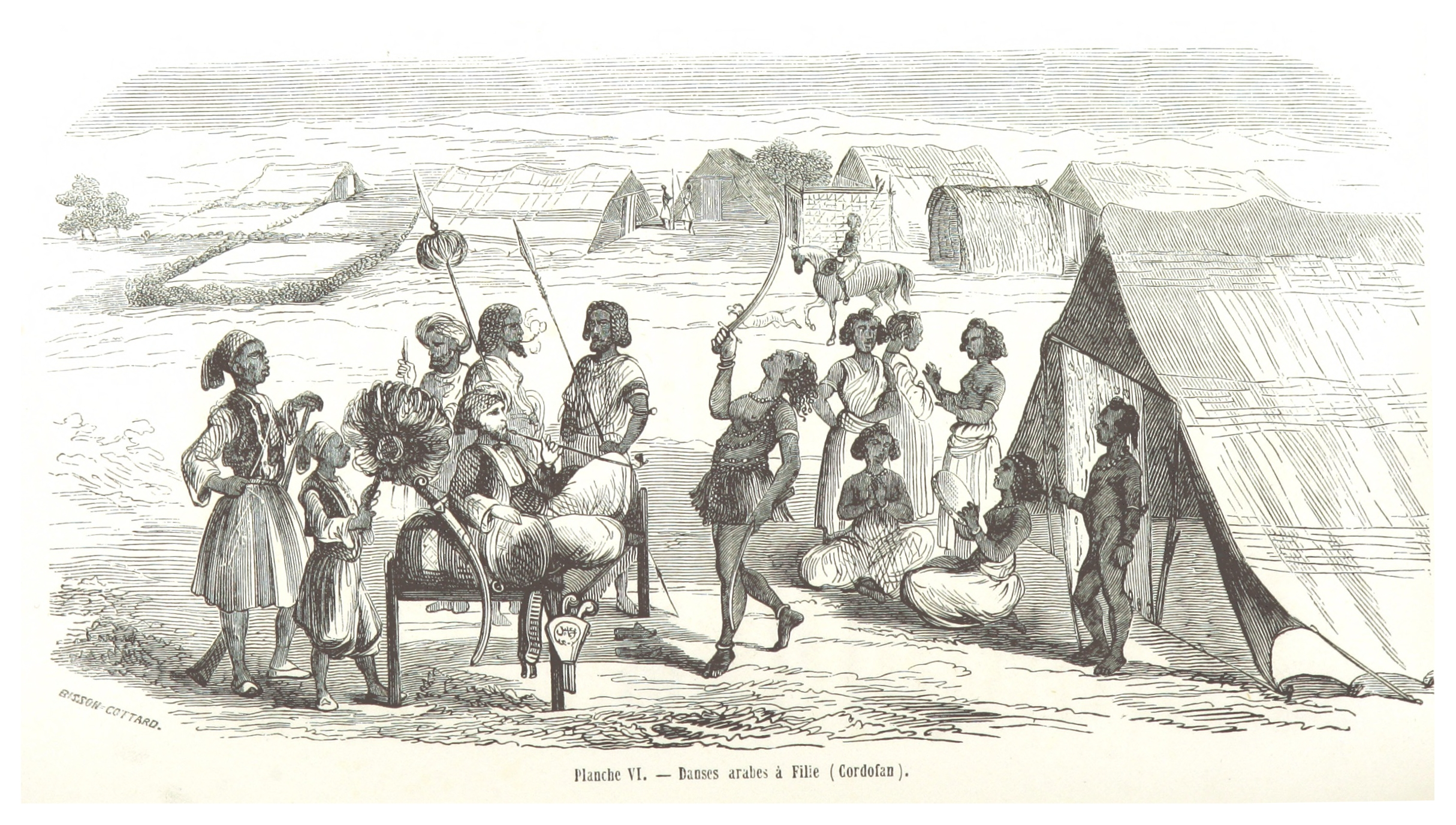

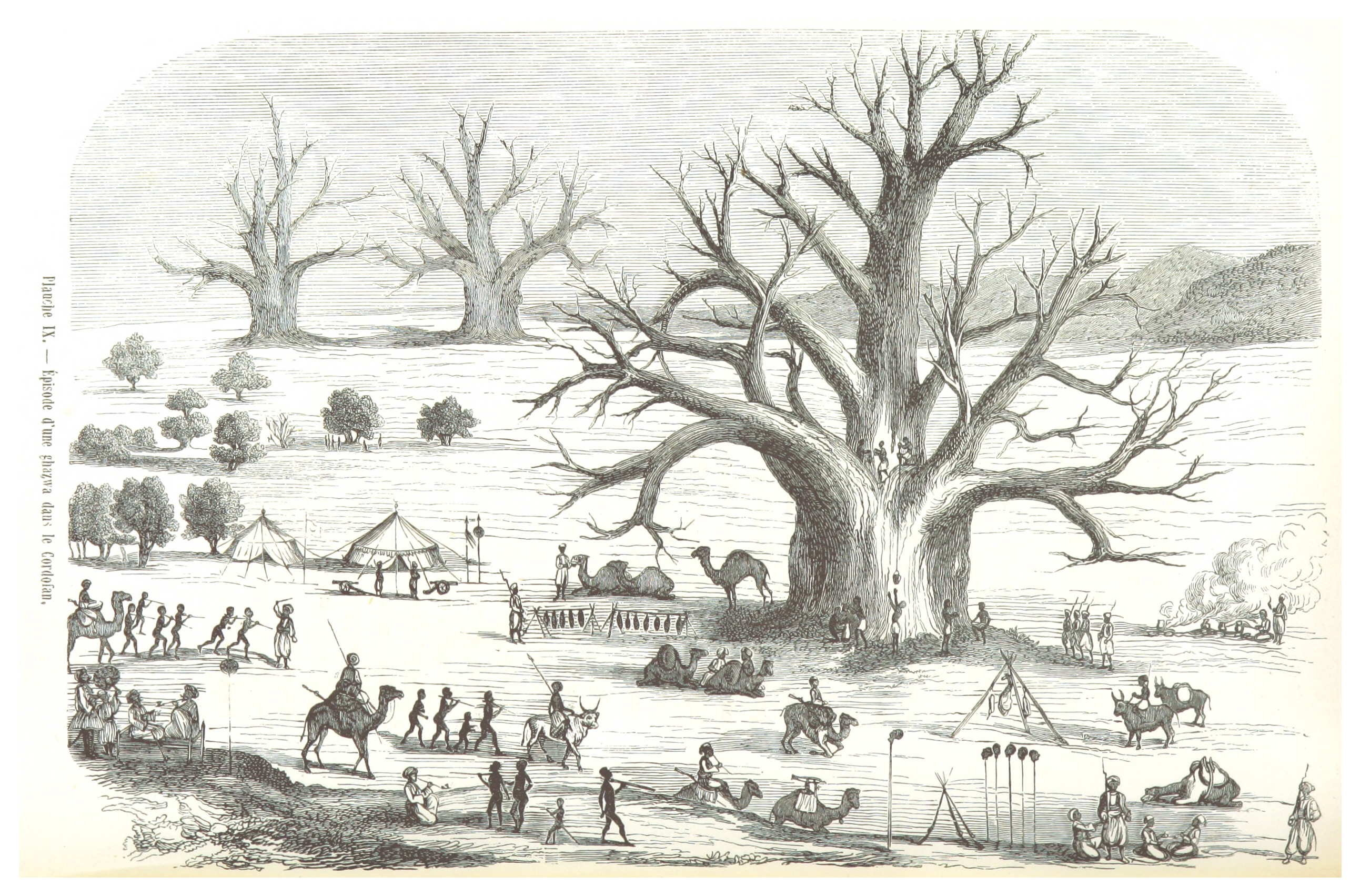

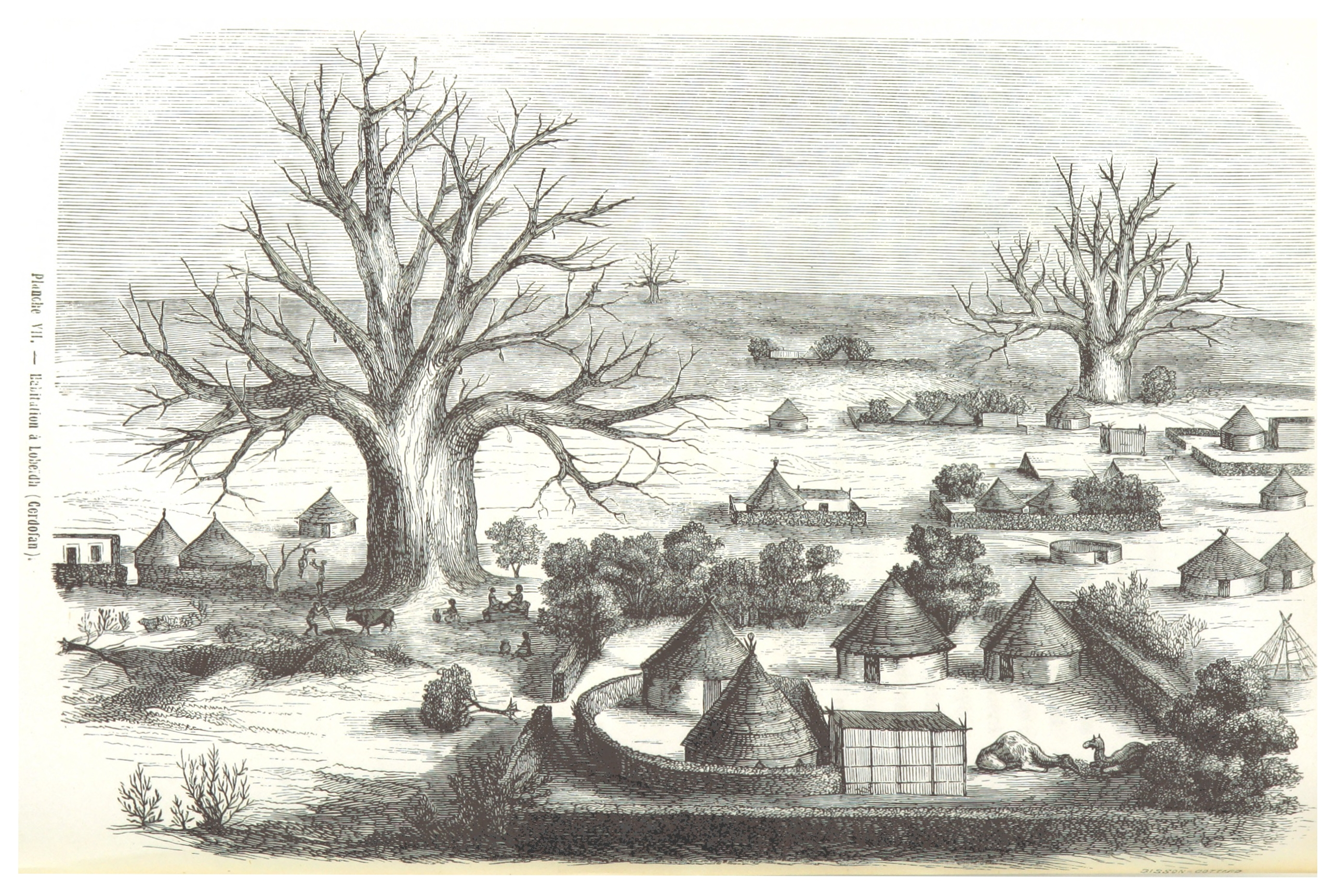

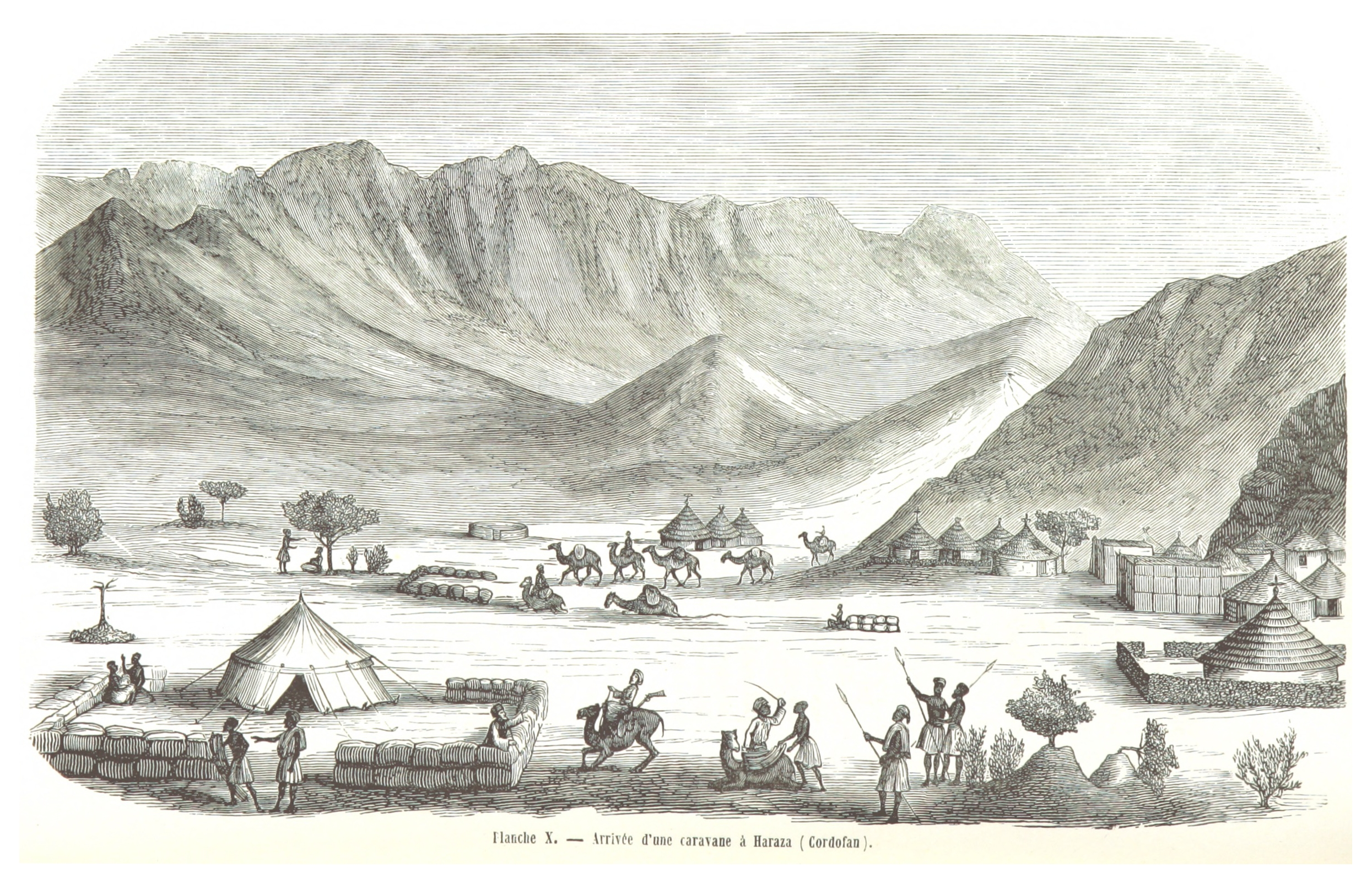

The Mahdi captured El Obeid in 1883 with the help of the merchant elite, such as the former Ja'alin Governor, Ilyas Pasha Um Barir. The Egyptian government dispatched a force from Cairo under the British General William Hicks, which was ambushed and annihilated at Sheikan to the south of El Obeid. Following British reoccupation in 1898, Kordofan was added to the number of provinces of the Sudan.

In 1973 it was split into the provinces (mudiriya) of North Kordofan and South Kordofan, which became states (wilayat) in 1994. In 2011, armed conflict in South Kordofan broke out in June 2011, ahead of independence for South Sudan. Fighting has since involved rebel groups in Darfur and has expanded into North Kordofan.

In 2023, the war in Sudan triggered conflict in the region again. As of early 2026, RSF captured West Korodofan, SPLM-N remains in small pockets in South Kordofan, with the government in control of most of the eastern and central areas. It has been the main battlefield in 2026 due to the army's recapture of many areas in east and central Sudan, and the RSF finishing the Darfur campaign.

== See also ==
- Kordofanian languages
