= West Kordofan =

State of Sudan

West Kordofan غرب كردفان Ġarb Kurdufān
- State
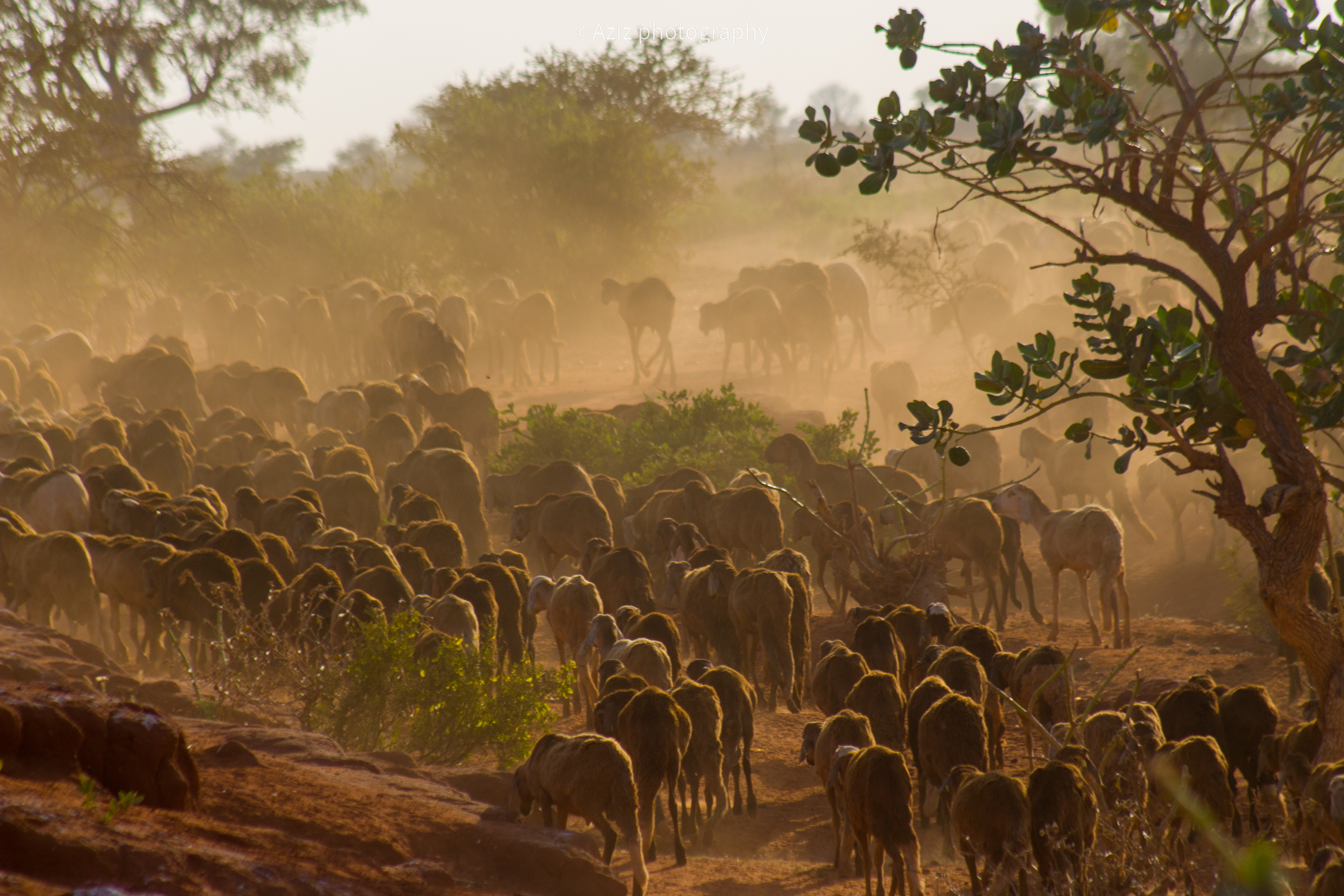
- A flock of Hamari sheep in Al-Khuwai

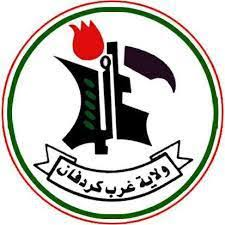
- Seal

- Location in Sudan.
- Coordinates: 12°0′N 28°9′E
- Country: Sudan
- Region: Nuba Mountains
- Control: Rapid Support Forces
- Capital: Al-Fulah

Government
  - Governor: Essam al-Din Haroun Ahmed

Area
  - Total: 111,373 km^{2} (43,001 sq mi)

Population (2006)
  - Total: 1,320,405
- Time zone: UTC+2 (CAT)

West Kordofan (Arabic: غرب كردفان; Ġarb Kurdufān) is one of the 18 wilayat or provinces of Sudan. In 2006 it had an area of 111,373 km^{2} and an estimated population of approximately 1,320,405. Al-Fulah is the capital of the state. West Kordofan borders North Kordofan to the north, South Kordofan to the east, South Sudan to the south, East Darfur and North Darfur to the west.

In August 2005, West Kordofan State was abolished and its territory divided between North and South Kordofan States, in implementation of the Protocol between the Government of Sudan (GOS) and the Sudan People’s Liberation Movement (SPLM) on the resolution of conflict in Southern Kordofan/Nuba Mountains and Blue Nile States signed at Naivasha, Kenya, 26 May 2004. Section 2.1 of the protocol states that "The boundaries of Southern Kordofan/Nuba Mountains State shall be the same boundaries of former Southern Kordofan Province when Greater Kordofan was sub-divided into two provinces." The protocol forms part of the Comprehensive Peace Agreement between the government of Sudan and the Sudan People's Liberation Movement. Al Fulah presently has the status of second capital of South Kordofan State, and sessions of the state Legislative Council are to alternate between Al Fulah and Kaduqli. The state was reestablished in July 2013.

== Role in the Sudanese civil war ==
During the ongoing civil war in Sudan, the RSF has gained large parts of the state. On 25 April 2023, the RSF took control of Wad Banda. Despite RSF control of Wad Banda, West Kordofan did not see fighting until four months later in August. On 14 August 2023, the RSF attacked the town of El-Khoi, resulting in the injuries of 3 civilians, seizing two police vehicles, one ambulance, and one civilian vehicle. Two days later on 16 August, the RSF waged an offensive on the capital of the state, El-Fulah, against the Sudanese army. In the beginning of 2024, the RSF laid siege to Babanusa. This came in response to SAF airstrikes near the city. By the end of 2024, the RSF had gained a heavy upper hand in the state by taking control of the capital and main roads with all the major localities, villages, towns, and cities, under its control. The RSF captured the capital, El-Fulah, after the Sudanese army withdrew to Babanusa. The SAF was able to keep control of its positions in En-Nahud but is surrounded. The Sudanese army made progress as well lifting the siege of Babanusa. Since June 2024, the conflict in West Kordofan has been unreported and seems no sides are waging military campaigns against the other in the state.

By the end of 2025, the state fell to the RSF completely.

== Districts ==
1. Lagawa District
2. As Salam District
3. Abyei District
4. Wad Banda
5. En Nuhud District
6. Abu Zabad
7. Ghubaysh District
8. Babanusa
9. Muglad
10. Keilak District
11. Al Sunut District
12. Al-Meiram

== Settlements ==
- Khamasat
- Markab
- Umm Oweisha
