= Sudan Shield Forces =

Armed group in the current Sudanese civil war

- Logo of the Sudan Shield Forces
- Leader: Abu Aqla Kaikal
- Dates active: 2022–present
- Headquarters: Gezira
- Active regions: Eastern Sudan (mostly Butana and Gezira),
- Size: 35,000-75,000 men,
- Wars: Sudanese civil war (2023–present): First Battle of Wad Madani; Sennar offensive; Battle of Jebel Moya; Second Battle of Wad Madani; Battle of Khartoum; Bahri offensive; 2026 Blue Nile campaign
- Website: Telegram and Twitter

Sudan Shield Forces (SSF, Arabic: قوات درع السودان, romanized: Qūwāt Dirʻ al-Sūdān) is an armed group which was created in 2022, and is led by Abu Aqla Kaikal. Sudan Shield Forces is fighting alongside the Sudanese Armed Forces (SAF), in the current Sudanese civil war.

== History ==
Sudan Shield Forces was created by Kaikal in 2022, in the state of Al-Gadarif. According to Kaikal the creation of the group was "to maintain security and restore strategic balance in the country, in light of the Juba Agreement". SSF fighters were mainly recruited from Arab communities in Gezira State.

=== Civil war ===
After the current civil war started Kaikal first sided with SAF but in August 2023 it stopped co-operation and defected to the Rapid Support Forces (RSF). SSF took part in the First battle of Wad Manadi. The group was reportedly in "full control" of Gezira state by December 2023. In October of 2024 Kaikal and his forces defected back to the SAF, which lead to a series of violent retaliatory attacks by the RSF on civilians in Gezira State. SSF participated in the Second battle of Wad Madani and with SAF they retook the town in 11 of January, 2025.

== War crimes ==
=== El-Gezira ===
During the RSF occupation of Gezira state, SSF forces were accused of war crimes including extajudicial killings of civilians, looting and rape.

=== Gezira State canal killings ===
According to the investigation published by CNN and Lighthouse Reports, after taking control of Wad Manadi in January 2025, SAF and SSF forces were connected to attacks against civilians, especially of the Kanabi ethnic group. Jaafar Mohamedein, the Secretary-General of the Kanabi Congress accused SSF of horrific acts such as “raping women, killing men, and burning children".
