= Battle of Jebel Moya =

2024 battle in Jebel Moya, Sennar State, Sudan

- Part of the Sennar offensive and Sudanese civil war (2023–present)
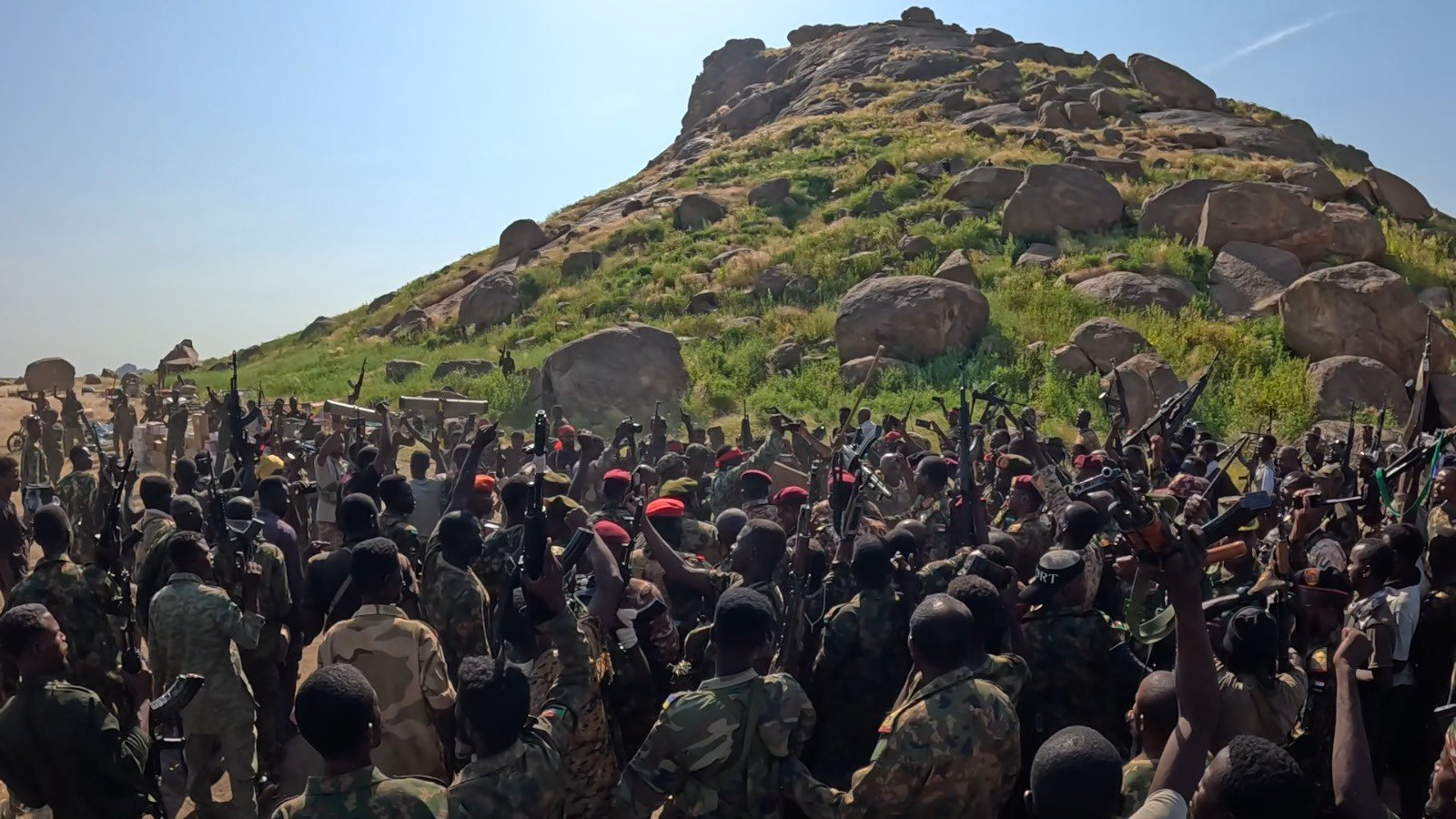
- SAF soldiers in Jebel moya
Date	25 June – 5 October 2024 (3 months, 1 week and 3 days)
Location	Jebel Moya, Sennar State, Sudan
Result	SAF victory: RSF captures Jebel Moya on 25 June.; SAF recaptures the area by 5 October.

Belligerents
Sudanese government; Sudanese Armed Forces; Popular Resistance; Al-Bara Battalion; General Intelligence Service	Rapid Support Forces

Commanders and leaders
Shams al-Din Kabashi; Ahmed Awad Bashir †	Abdel Rahman Albishi; Abu Aqla Kikil

Units involved
17th Infantry Division; 18th Infantry Division; GIS Anti-Terrorism Forces; Al-Bara' ibn Malik Battalion	Unknown

Casualties and losses
Unknown	50 killed 15 vehicles destroyed Large amount of weapons and ammunition seized
- +20 civilians killed, 1,455 people displaced

The Battle of Jebel Moya was the 3-month battle over the strategically important area of Jebel Moya in the Sennar State during the Sudanese civil war. It saw the area be initially taken over by the RSF in June 2024 for around 3 months before it was recaptured by SAF in October of the same year. The recapture of Jebel Moya was the main reason of the start of SAF offensives in other areas in the state due to its strategic supply route.

== Background ==
On April 15, 2023, RSF forces attacked SAF units and took control of various areas around Sudan, including in that capital of Khartoum, beginning the Sudanese civil war. The RSF would go on to take control of Wad Madani and much of the Gezira State, allowing them to launch attacks on to the Sennar State.

The Jebel Moya area is important due to its strategic location between 3 major army bases, the 17th infantry division and 265th air force brigade in Sennar in the east, the 18th infantry division in Kosti in the west, and the 1st infantry division which used to be in Wad Madani, but had to be stationed in El Manaqil after the city fell on December 19, 2023. The area also is the only connection for the SAF's supply routes between the southern Gezira State and the White Nile State as the Omdurman - Kosti route was cut by RSF units in Southern Omdurman and Jabal Awliya.

== Timeline ==
The SAF claimed to have full control over the area on May 3, but this was denied by the RSF. It was later found that while the RSF had a presence in the area, it was largely under SAF control. The RSF then launched an early morning attack on SAF positions in the area. These clashes resulted in an unknown amount of civilian casualties.

On June 25, 2024, the RSF and SAF began clashing over the area again. the SAF initially claimed that they repelled the attack and were also able to retake control of the Sennar Sugar Factory. However, the RSF claimed to have taken control of Jebel Moya after a 7 hour long battle and advanced onto Singa. The U.N.'s International Organization for Migration reported that 1,455 people fled from their homes. The SAF's 18th Infantry Division had to retreat west to Jabal Dud and maintained their position there. This also allowed the RSF to carry out attacks on the city of Sennar and they were able to take control of the capital of Singa.

After taking control, locals reported that the RSF killed over 20 individuals and looted homes and properties in the area. On June 26, the SAF claimed to have repulsed an attack by an RSF convoy consisting of 7 vehicles. During battles on June 27, the leader of the Al-Bara' ibn Malik Battalion's Sennar Sector, Ahmed Awad Bashir, was killed in the fighting. Fighting between both sides and airstrikes by the SAF on paramilitary positions were reported on June 29.

On July 15, 2024, the SAF launched airstrikes on RSF positions in the area. The RSF also shot anti-aircraft missiles at the Kenana Airport. On July 2, the Sudanese Foreign Ministry claimed the RSF carried out a massacre and killed over 40 people in areas around Sennar, including villages around Jebel Moya.

On October 3, as part of a larger counteroffensive that began on September 26, the SAF and RSF began fighting again, with the SAF retaking the villages of Fangoga and Jebel El Aawar in the Southeast and Jabal Sagadi in the northwest and forcing the RSF back to Jebel Moya. The SAF carried out at least 4 consecutive attacks on the RSF over the following 4 days. The SAF's plan was for the 18th Infantry Division to advance westwards from Jabal Dud, and the 17th Infantry Division, backed by the General Intelligence Service's Anti-Terrorism Force, to advance eastwards from Sennar and for them to meet in Jebel Moya.

On October 5, the SAF claimed to have fully retaken Jebel Moya, claiming to have taken control of the Al-Blijab and Fanquqa Al-Jabal areas. This cut off the RSF's supply lines for its units in Singa, Dinder, and the rest of the Sennar State. The Anti-Terrorism Forces helped the SAF sweep the area, killing 50 RSF fighters and destroying 15 vehicles. The SAF also seized a large amount of ammunition and weapons that had been supplied to the RSF by the UAE in the area, though the UAE denied supplying them. Hemedti, the leader of the RSF, later admitted defeat but also claimed that the Egyptian Air Force had dropped American bombs onto RSF targets in the area from 3 am to 10 am local time, though Egypt denied this.

== Aftermath ==
After its recapture, Abdel Fattah Al Burhan came by helicopter and was seen inspecting troops in the region.

The recapture of the area cut off the RSF's supply lines to the rest of the Sennar State, and led to further RSF defeats in Dinder, Singa, and the rest of the area. By 2025, the RSF was pushed back to only a few villages in Sennar, including Mazmum, and there have been very few clashes.
