= Popular Resistance of Sudan =

Armed factions in Sudan (2023–present)

- Arabic: المقاومة الشعبية في السودان
- Insignia of the Sudanese Popular Resistance (SPR), one of many factions that are part of the Popular Resistance in Sudan
- Active: June 2023; 3 years ago
- Country: Sudan
- Allegiance: Sudanese Armed Forces
- Engagements: Sudanese civil war (2023–present); Battle of Khartoum (2023–2025); Battle of Wad Madani; Battle of El Fasher; Sennar offensive; Battle of Jebel Moya

Commanders
- Head (Note: Most of the Popular Resistance factions operate separately with no formal structure, but a Supreme Council was formed on 30 March 2024 under the auspices of the Sudanese army): Azhari Al-Mubarak Muhammad
- PSC: Nazir Muhammad Al-Amin Turk
- Deputy PSC: Khader Al-Mubarak Ali
- Spokesperson: Ammar Hassan
- Notable commanders: Almusbah Abuzaid; Emir Kafi Tayara; Ahmed El Bushra

The Popular Resistance (Arabic: المقاومة الشعبية Al-Muqawamat ash-Sha'abiyah), also known as the Popular mobilisation (Arabic: الاستنفار الشعبي), is a coalition of armed factions in Sudan that was formed in response to the ongoing conflict between the Sudanese Armed Forces (SAF) and the Rapid Support Forces (RSF). This conflict, rooted in a power struggle within the country's military structure, erupted into full-scale war on 15 April 2023.

General Abdel Fattah al-Burhan, leading the SAF, initiated the Popular Resistance to unite various political and social groups under the banner of "national dignity." Although lacking a formal arsenal, the resistance receives direct support and military training from the SAF. This mass mobilisation has seen the training of thousands of civilians across Sudan, prepared for combat to defend against the RSF's aggressive expansion and severe human rights violations. The RSF's control over northern regions, like Gezira state, which was marked by severe atrocities, prompted widespread civilian armament and participation in the resistance. This has included public figures and government officials who actively support civilian training and armament initiatives.

Despite its broad base and significant role in the conflict, the Popular Resistance faces challenges due to its lack of formal structure, Islamist leanings of some factions formed by ex-members of the Popular Defence Forces, and the potential for escalating violence and societal disturbances. The increasing proliferation of arms among civilians, coupled with the ethnic and regional dynamics of the conflict, raises concerns about the potential for a prolonged and fractious civil conflict in Sudan.

== Background ==
The conflict in Sudan is primarily a power struggle between two factions within the country's military structure. The Sudanese Armed Forces (SAF), led by General Abdel Fattah al-Burhan, and the Rapid Support Forces (RSF), a paramilitary group led by Mohamed Hamdan "Hemedti" Dagalo, are battling for control of the state and its resources.

The RSF was originally formed from the Janjaweed and was administered by the National Intelligence and Security Service in August 2013. It was founded to crush the rebellion in Darfur due to the political and economic marginalisation of the local population by Sudan's central government. The RSF, known for widespread atrocities, has a stronghold in Darfur, with many recruits drawn from the region. After the ousting of Omar al-Bashir in 2019, attempts to transition to a democratic civilian-led government faltered. A coup in October 2021 put the army back in charge, leading to weekly protests, renewed isolation, and deepening economic woes. This led to an eventual showdown between Burhan and Hemedti.

Since April 2023, there has been a civil war in Sudan between the two main factions of the country's military government. The conflict involves the internationally recognized government of Sudan led by the Sudanese Armed Forces (SAF), under General Abdel Fattah al-Burhan; against the rival Government of Peace and Unity led by the Rapid Support Forces (RSF) paramilitary group, commanded by General Hemedti (Muhammad Hamdan Dagalo Musa). Smaller armed groups have also taken part on both sides, most notably Sudan Liberation Movement splinter groups, the Tamazuj militia, and the Darfur Joint Protection Force.

Fighting began on 15 April 2023 following a power struggle within the transitional administration established after the 2021 coup. As of 6 July 2026, the conflict has forcibly displaced over 14 million people, with 4.5 million fleeing the country as refugees, making it one of the largest displacement crises in recent history. The conflict has also seen heavy influence from foreign powers, especially Russia, Turkey, Saudi Arabia, Iran, Egypt, Ethiopia and the United Arab Emirates, while also experiencing effects from the spillover of neighboring conflicts in the Central African Republic (CAR), Chad and Libya.

The current war erupted amid tensions regarding the integration of the RSF into the Sudanese Army following the 2021 coup. Initial RSF attacks targeted government sites in the capital, Khartoum, and other cities. The conflict began with the Battle of Khartoum, and fighting then spread to the Darfur region. The capital region was divided between the two factions, and al-Burhan relocated his government to Port Sudan. International efforts, including the 2023 Jeddah Declaration, failed to stop the fighting, while various rebel groups entered the war: the SPLM–North attacked the SAF in the south; the Tamazuj movement joined the RSF; and the SAF gained support from factions of the Sudan Liberation Movement and Justice and Equality Movement.

By late 2023, the RSF controlled most of Darfur and advanced on Khartoum, taking over most of the capital, Kordofan and Gezira. The SAF regained momentum in 2024, making gains in Omdurman and retaking Khartoum by March 2025. Despite negotiations, no lasting ceasefire has been reached, and the war continues with severe humanitarian consequences and regional implications.

The city of El Fasher, the SAF's last stronghold in Darfur, was besieged by the RSF from April 2024. On 26 October 2025, the city fell to the RSF, with the city and neighboring villages suffering what some experts called a genocidal massacre inflicting between 60,000 and 70,000 deaths by one estimate. Satellite estimates have been as high as 150,000 dead, making it the largest massacre of the 21st century.

Sudan faces one of the world's most severe humanitarian crises, with widespread famine and 25 million people suffering severe food insecurity. Four million children are acutely malnourished, including 770,000 at imminent risk of death, and famine has been confirmed in several regions. The country faces extreme shortages of water, medicine and aid access, widespread hospital closures, disease outbreaks, mass displacement, looting of humanitarian supplies, and the near-collapse of education and infrastructure, leaving half the population in urgent need. The total death toll of the war comprises fatalities from violence, starvation and disease; thousands remain missing or were killed in targeted massacres primarily attributed to the RSF and allied militias. 61,000 people have died in Khartoum State alone, of whom 26,000 were direct victims of violence. Sexual violence has been widespread. UN under-secretary for humanitarian affairs Tom Fletcher described Darfur as the "epicenter of human suffering in the world".

There have been calls for more aid, legal protections for humanitarian workers, refugee support and a halt to international arms supplies to the RSF, particularly from the United Arab Emirates (UAE). The US, UK, EU and Canada imposed sanctions on entities linked to both factions for ceasefire violations and human rights abuses. Despite denials, the UAE has been found to violate these sanctions by shipping Chinese weaponry to the RSF, which largely funds its operations through gold exports to the UAE. Many civilians in Darfur have been killed as part of the Masalit genocide. On 7 January 2025, the United States government formally determined that the RSF and its allied militias committed acts of genocide.

== Formation and role ==
In June 2023, General Abdel Fattah al-Burhan, the Commander-in-Chief of the SAF, initiated a mass mobilisation dubbed the Popular Resistance, uniting people across political affiliations in "defence of national dignity," and to protect themselves and their property. The SAF oversees mobilisation and readiness camps.

This led to the training of numerous young men across various cities. The Popular Resistance obtains its weaponry directly from the SAF. It does not possess its own arsenal but functions in tandem with SAF. Military training for Resistance members occurs in local neighbourhoods and is conducted by SAF officers, soldiers, and non-commissioned officers.

The RSF, primarily composed of individuals from Darfur, responded by increasing their recruitment efforts. By 3 December, al-Burhan announced the mobilisation of approximately 40,000 individuals to counter the RSF. The RSF used this announcement to justify their takeover of Gezira state on 19 December 2023, the country's second-largest and home to a major agricultural project. The RSF's takeover was marked by severe atrocities, which were well-documented by civil society groups and protesters. The RSF also threatened to expand their control to other states.

In response to the growing threat from the RSF, many Sudanese civilians, encouraged by the military, armed themselves. The military also promised to arm more civilians associated with the popular resistance, despite lacking a formal leadership structure. Government officials started participating in resistance activities, and state media, controlled by the military, gave them widespread coverage. For example, Muhammad al-Badawi, Governor of the River Nile State, and Major General Muhammad al-Amin pledged that they would provide training and weapons for civilians to take arms. In addition, in February 2024, Al-Hafiz Bakhit Mohammed, the acting governor of North Darfur State, has declared the start of a popular resistance in El-Fasher. This resistance aims to back the SAF and its allied movements in their fight against the RSF. The Popular Resistance is also active in Al-Qadarif State, Sennar State, Red Sea State, and Khartoum State.

On 30 March 2024, a founding conference was held in Port Sudan under the auspices of the Sudanese government to form the Supreme Council of Popular Resistance, chaired by Muhammad al-Amin Turk and deputed by Lieutenant General Khader al-Mubarak Ali. Azhari al-Mubarak Muhammad was unanimously chosen as Head of the Popular Resistance. However, most of the Popular Resistance factions operate separately with no formal structure.

Lieutenant General Yasser al-Atta welcomed anyone fighting against the "Janjaweed militia". He revealed the Popular Resistance's significant contribution to the Omdurman liberation battles and their preparation for future operations. According to Ammar Hassan, the spokesperson for the Popular Resistance, the Popular Resistance fought alongside the SAF in all battles, including those in Omdurman, the Sudanese Radio and TV Corporation, and Kordofan. They have shown resilience in Babanusa, West Kordofan, and readiness in Sennar, Al-Gaziera, Al-Fau, Managil, and other regions.

Some observers believe that the balance of power has begun to tilt in favour of the army in light of the retreat of the other party, especially after the Popular Resistance entered the front line and recruited thousands and armed them to support the state.

== Known factions ==
Several cities in the north are witnessing the formation of popular resistance groups. The Khartoum State government recently announced the start of the Supreme Committee for Popular Resistance's activities and opened recruitment and arming in army-controlled areas. However, an anonymous army officer stated that these groups are mainly responsible for securing neighbourhoods and sites, and not for combat operations. Contrarily, a member of the popular resistance confirmed his participation in combat operations.

=== Pro-revolution faction ===
Other groups, such as the Popular Security group and the youth group Angry Without Borders, have also joined the army forces. The latter, known for its resistance against the military junta, has members in various army units and camps.

=== Islamist factions and Popular Defence Forces ===
Islamist groups have significantly bolstered the Sudanese army's ranks. Their involvement with the army traces back to the 1990s when they were part of the Popular Defence Forces (PDF), a paramilitary group closely linked to the Hassan al-Turabi's National Islamic Front (later the National Congress Party) and Omar al-Bashir. The army was 'Islamised' in the early 1990s under al-Bashir's rule, with suspected opponents often removed or executed.

The PDF, which fought against the Sudan People's Liberation Army (SPLA) in the second Sudanese civil war, has been operating covertly since Bashir's removal until the war in Sudan broke out on 15 April 2023. The broader Islamic movement have been preparing their fighters since 2019 and have connections with some officers in Sudan's military intelligence. In 2020, rumours were circulating that the Sudanese Armed Forces had absorbed the former PDF. However, the SAF instead stated that the PDF had been dissolved and its headquarters seized. During the war in Sudan, a reorganised PDF under Emir Kafi Tayara fought alongside the Army in South Kordofan against the SPLM-N and the Rapid Support Forces.

==== Al-Bara' ibn Malik Battalion ====
The Al-Bara' ibn Malik Battalion has been actively fighting alongside the SAF in their ongoing battles against the Rapid Support Forces (RSF) since the war started on 15 April 2023, suffering many casualties in various locations. One of the deadliest battles for the Al-Bara bin Malik fighters occurred inside and around the military Armoured Corps in Khartoum. According to Daraj, Al-Bara' ibn Malik Battalion has representation in at least two military divisions, namely the Armoured Corps and the Infantry Corps. They also have a presence in a third location, the Central Reserve Forces, which the United States has sanctioned due to their involvement in quelling peaceful demonstrations.

The battalion has appeared in numerous video clips, depicting its active participation in these battles. The group, led by Almusbah Abuzaid, promotes a militant Islamist ideology. Abuzaid, who was injured in the fighting in Khartoum, was visited by Abdel Fattah al-Burhan, Commander-in-Chief of the SAF, at a hospital in Atbara. Videos on social media show Abuzaid chanting militant slogans and advocating for a "jihad" against the RSF. Another leader, Anas Omer, was a notable member of the now-disbanded National Congress Party (NCP) under President al-Bashir, and was taken into custody by the RSF on 16 May 2023. Muhammad al-Fadl Abd al-Wahed Othman, another leader, previously has sworn loyalty to Islamic State, and he was killed in action June 2023.

==== Resilience ====
The Resilience (Arabic: صمود) faction released a video on 18 September 2023 featuring masked and unidentified armed individuals unveiling a foundational manifesto, "Statement Number 1", outlining the group's mission and goals. The manifesto, addressed to the people of Sudan, starts with a Quranic verses, then enumerates the alleged offences of the RSF. It pledges to free Khartoum from RSF "mercenaries" and cleanse the city of their presence.

===== Other Islamist factions =====
The Al-Bunyan Al-Marsous (Arabic: البنيان المرصوص) battalion, a large former unit of the disbanded Popular Defense Forces, is now fighting with the Sudanese army. This battalion includes ex-members of the National Intelligence and Security Service from the Bashir regime era. The battalion has undergone advanced weapons training and is currently deployed in several capital cities.

=== Other groups ===
According to Al Jazeera Arabic, preparations are underway to announce a new battalion, Al-Matmoura (Arabic: كتيبة المطمورة), in Gedaref state, along with other groups in different localities. These groups are being trained and armed under the supervision of local government authorities and military leadership.

The Middle Call, a grassroots coalition in central Sudan, formed in response to the RSF's violence and the SAF's failure to protect civilians. Emerging in el-Gezira, Sennar, White Nile, Blue Nile, and North Kordofan states, the movement accuses the RSF of land appropriation and forced displacement, threatening Sudan's food security. It has organised self-defence units, trained local youth, and launched legal and media campaigns against the RSF. While aimed at protecting communities, the group's militarisation raises concerns about escalating violence and deepening the conflict.

== Women role ==
Women have been mainly at the forefront of the non-armed and humanitarian response to the war. These groups also provide support to affected families, offer shelter to the displaced, facilitate the evacuation of those trapped in Khartoum, and provide medical services. Women's groups like the Women Against War network and the 'Mothers of Sudan' campaign have been working at different levels to end the war. They document violations, monitor the situation, advocate for peace, and exert pressure on the international community and other parties to support a resolution and achieve peace.

Nonetheless, Sky News reported on combat training camps for women in Port Sudan. The women in the camp call themselves the Black Army due to the colour of their Jilbāb, and they are led by Alia Hassan Abuna, a leader in the Forces of Freedom and Change. The women are trained mostly for self-defence and community patrols.

Another training camp in River Nile State (named Al-Sarirah Makki camp) and North Kordofan were also reported.

== Critiques ==
=== Lack of formal structure, proliferation of weapons, and civil war ===
The Popular Resistance's lack of a formal leadership structure has raised concerns about its ability to manage and coordinate its activities effectively. Former armed forces officer, Fathi Ahmed, criticised the current popular resistance as a failure due to its ethnic and regional basis, inadequate training, and ineffective battle plans.

The increasing spread of arms is causing alarm about the possibility of societal disturbances, akin to the strife seen in Darfur amidst the ongoing war. Data from official sources indicate that prior to the war's onset, civilians possessed eight million firearms. These weapons have contributed to lethal assaults by diverse communities, spanning from Darfur and Kordofan to the Blue Nile area. There are fears of new world lords emerging from the conflict. In response, al-Burhan announced his welcome to the popular resistance, saying: "We will arm them; What weapons we have will we give to them? But it must be codified and registered with the regular forces, so that it does not cause a problem in the future."

Fears of ethnically motivated outbreak of a civil war are also increasing.

The opposition politicians abroad, namely Taqaddum, rejected calls for mobilisation and stood against the establishment of the Popular Resistance, declaring that these calls would inflame military conflict at a time when they themselves were adopting dialogue under the slogan "No to war." They said that this call to arm citizens could ignite a civil war in the country.

=== Concerns about growth and political exploitation ===
According to the International Center for Strategic Studies (ICSS), which is funded and situated in the United Arab Emirates, the Popular Resistance is influenced by jihadist and ethnic ideologies which led to arrests and eliminations of individuals from western Sudan, who are seen as supporters of the RSF. For example, the governors of the Nile River, the North, and North Kordofan have taken steps to dissolve the Sudanese resistance committees and target activists. The ICSS preserves this as a strategy for Islamists to regain power. According to Ihsan Al-Faqih writing for the Middle East Monitor, opponents – including Taqaddum – are speculating that the previous Sudanese regime is orchestrating this mobilisation to settle political disputes.

On 29 March, amid criticism over Islamist, like ex-members of the Popular Defence Forces, participation with the army, SAF Deputy Commander-in-Chief, Shams al-Din Kabbashi, warned against political exploitation of the Popular Resistance groups' activities. Khabbashi stressed that factions like Al-Bara' ibn Malik Battalion "need to be better controlled." He stressed the need for regulations to control these groups and prevent them from becoming a future threat. In response, Lieutenant General Yasser al-Atta advocated for a structured popular resistance, with units collaborating with the army and police, and committees for humanitarian aid and services. He also refuted claims of the army's Islamist alignment. Activist Hisham Abbas pointed out that the conflicts between Yasser Al-Atta and Shams al-Din Kabbashi have become openly apparent and cannot be overlooked or minimised. He emphasised that disagreements within the army are not new, but they have not previously been so publicly visible.

On 2 April 2024, 15 people were killed and more than 50 were injured after a drone attack in Atbara that struck an iftar gathering organised by the Al-Bara Islamic militia. The RSF is yet to claim responsibility of the attack that happened 300 kilometres (190 mi) away from its nearest camp. Mustafa Tambour, leader of the Sudan Liberation Movement (Tambour) which is allied with the SAF, insinuated the SAF involvement in the attack as he stated that "In no way can our internal disagreements lead us to events like these that took place today in the city of Atbara, in which a number of heroes were killed. They could have been an addition to the armed forces and not an opponent to them."

In addition, according to Areej Elhag writing for The Washington Institute for Near East Policy, there are concern that the Popular Resistance could transform into a powerful militia akin to the Iraqi Popular Mobilization Forces. There also fears of repeating the scenario that led to forming the RSF itself.

==== Islamic extremism ====
In June 2023, at the meeting of the United Nations General Assembly, the commander of RSF, Hemedti, alleged that the army was being assisted in their fight by the Islamic State (IS) and supporters of the al-Bashir regime. In a development in May, the RSF detained a number of individuals, among them Mohamed Ali Al-Jazouli, a well-known supporter of IS, who had previously pledged to fight the RSF. The SAF denied these allegation.

=== Children conscription ===
Sky News Arabia reported on the conscription of hundreds of children between the age of 12 and 14 at a military camp near Shendi, River Nile State.
