= Al-Bara' ibn Malik Battalion =

Sudanese Islamist militia

- كتيبة البراء بن مالك
- The battalion's logo with the battalion's name and the phrase "Here I am, Messenger of God" in Arabic
- Notable leaders: Almusbah Abuzaid (Commander); Anas Omar (POW); Huzeifa Istanbul; Muhammad al-Fadl †; Hudheifa Adam †; Gusay Bushra †; Muhannad Fadl †
- Dates active: 7 January 2020; 6 years ago
- Country: Sudan
- Allegiance: National Congress Party (formerly the National Islamic Front)
- Ideology: Islamism; Salafi jihadism
- Size: 20,000 (2025)
- Part of: Popular Defence Forces (currently known as the Shadow Battalions); Popular Resistance
- Wars: Sudanese civil war (2023–present); Battle of Khartoum (2023–2025); Kordofan Campaign (2023–present); First Battle of Wad Madani; Sennar offensive; Battle of Jebel Moya; Siege of El Fasher

The Al-Bara' ibn Malik Battalion (Arabic: كتيبة البراء بن مالك, romanized: Katībat al-Barāʼ ibn Mālik), also spelled as El-Baraa Ibn Malik or Abaraa Iban Malik, is a Sudanese Islamist militia that emerged within the complex network of militias and armed factions in Sudan, operating within the Sudanese Popular Resistance movement. The militia is linked to the Popular Defence Forces, a paramilitary group that was active during Bashir regime era, and currently known as the 'Shadow Battalions'. It has been active in supporting the Sudanese Armed Forces (SAF) in their ongoing battles against the Rapid Support Forces (RSF).

The organization is currently fighting with the SAF on the Khartoum front lines against the RSF and has consequently gained popularity among locals. The militia is accused of committing war crimes during the conflict, and was designated as a terrorist group by the US government in March 2026.

== Origin ==
The battalion, Al-Bara' ibn Malik, is named after a famous Muslim combatant during the early Muslim conquests.

The Al-Bara bin Malik Battalion and similar militant groups have significantly bolstered the Sudanese army's ranks. Their involvement with the army traces back to the 1990s when they were part of the Popular Defence Forces (PDF), a paramilitary group closely linked to Hassan al-Turabi's National Islamic Front (later the National Congress Party) and Omar al-Bashir. The army was 'Islamised' in the early 1990s under al-Bashir's rule, with suspected opponents often removed or executed.

The PDF, which fought against the Sudan People’s Liberation Army (SPLA) in the Second Sudanese Civil War, has been operating covertly since Bashir's removal until the war in Sudan broke out on 15 April 2023. Since then, the PDF joined the Sudanese Armed Forces (SAF) side in its fight against the Rapid Support Forces (RSF).

== Creation and role in the Sudanese civil war (2023–present) ==
The al-Bara' ibn Malik Battalion and the broader Islamic movement have been preparing their fighters since the Sudanese revolution in 2019, and have connections with some officers in Sudan's military intelligence.

The group has been actively fighting alongside the SAF in their ongoing battles against the Rapid Support Forces (RSF) since the war started on 15 April 2023, suffering many casualties in various locations. One of the deadliest battles for the Al-Bara bin Malik fighters occurred inside and around the military Armoured Corps in Khartoum. According to Daraj, Al-Bara' ibn Malik Battalion has representation in at least two military divisions, namely the Armoured Corps and the Infantry Corps. They also have a presence in a third location, the Central Reserve Forces, which have been sanctioned by the United States due to their involvement in quelling peaceful demonstrations.

The battalion has made appearances in numerous video clips, depicting its active participation in these battles. The group, led by Almusbah Abuzaid, promotes a militant Islamist ideology. Abuzaid, who was injured in the fighting in Khartoum, was visited by Abdel Fattah al-Burhan, Commander-in-Chief of the SAF, at a hospital in Atbara. Videos on social media show Abuzaid chanting militant slogans and advocating for a "jihad" against the RSF. Another leader, Anas Omer, was a notable member of the now-disbanded National Congress Party (NCP) under President al-Bashir, and was taken into custody by the RSF on 16 May 2023. Muhammad al-Fadl Abd al-Wahed Othman, another leader, previously has sworn loyalty to Islamic State, and he was killed in action June 2023.

On 11 July 2024, Hudheifa Adam, the commander of its southern sector covering Sennar and Blue Nile states, was killed in action in Mairuno, south of Sennar city, along with Gusay Bushra, its commander in Sennar state.

In July 2024, the commander of the battalion Almusbah Abuzaid was arrested by Saudi authorities. He was later released.

The organization is currently engaged on the Khartoum front lines against the RSF and has consequently gained a notable degree of recognition and popularity among the local population.

== War crimes accusations ==
The RSF, Tagadum, and Beja Congress party accused al-Bara' ibn Malik Battalion of killing 70 youth soup kitchen volunteers in Halfaya, Khartoum Bahri, for allegedly collaborating with the RSF.

Human Rights Watch accused al-Bara' ibn Malik Battalion of committing war crimes by targeting civilians during the SAF offensive in Gezira state. Dozens of widely circulated videos have shown abuses against residents of Wad Madani, the capital of Al-Jazirah State, after they were accused of collaborating with the RSF. A video shows a citizen being dragged by members of al-Bara milita, a rope tied around his mouth, and then thrown into the Nile from a bridge after his body was filled with bullets.

In addition to these allegations, a joint report by the investigative outlet Lighthouse Reports and UN Human Rights experts documented further atrocities in Gezira State, where the battalion and allied forces reportedly slaughtered dozens of unarmed men via beheadings and disembowelments. These escalating human rights abuses and extrajudicial executions ultimately led the United States to officially designate the Al-Baraa Bin Malik Brigade as a Specially Designated Global Terrorist organization in March 2026.

== Reception and sanctions ==
At the meeting of the United Nations General Assembly, the commander of RSF, Hemedti, alleged that the army was being assisted in their fight by the Islamic State (IS) and supporters of the al-Bashir regime. In a development in May 2023, the RSF detained a number of individuals, among them Mohamed Ali Al-Jazouli, a well-known supporter of IS, who had previously pledged to fight the RSF.

On 29 March, SAF commander Shams al-Din Khabbashi stressed that groups like Al-Bara' ibn Malik Battalion "need to be better controlled." On 2 April 2024, 15 people were killed and more than 50 were injured after a drone attack in Atbara that struck an iftar gathering organised by the unit.

On 12 September 2025, the United States imposed sanctions on the unit for its role in the civil war and connections with Iran. On 30 January 2026, the European Union sanctioned the unit's commander, Al-Misbah Abu Zaid Talha. On 9 March 2026, the United States included the unit to its list of Specially Designated Global Terrorists.

The group was also sanctioned by Australia for human rights violations on 5 November 2026.
