= 2024–2025 Bahri offensive =

Major offensive of the Sudanese civil war

- Part of the Sudanese civil war and the Battle of Khartoum (2023–2025)
| Date | 26 September 2024 – 17 February 2025 (2 years, 1 month, 3 weeks and 3 days) |
| Location | Bahri, Sudan |
| Status | SAF victory: Sudanese army and allied forces take fully control of the city of Bahri on February 17th 2025 |

Belligerents
| Sudanese government; Sudanese Armed Forces; Sudan Shield Forces (from February 2025) | Rapid Support Forces |

Commanders and leaders
| Abu Aqla Kikil (from February 2025) | Unknown |

Casualties and losses
- At least 18 civilians

The 2024–2025 Bahri offensive was a military campaign conducted by the Sudanese Armed Forces (SAF) beginning in September 2024 to recapture strategic areas of Bahri (also known as Khartoum North) from the Rapid Support Forces (RSF) during the ongoing Sudanese civil war. The offensive operated in conjunction with the Battle of Khartoum.

== Background ==
Prior to the offensive, the Rapid Support Forces (RSF) maintained control over significant portions of Khartoum's metropolitan area, including large sections of Khartoum Bahri. The Sudanese Armed Forces (SAF) had initiated a series of military operations in the region beginning in December 2023, starting with an offensive in central Omdurman. By September 2024, SAF forces had established a presence in northwestern Khartoum.

== Offensive ==
In late September 2024, the SAF initiated major ground offensives on three fronts. The operations targeted areas in Khartoum and Bahri (also known as Khartoum North) that had been held under RSF control since the war's outbreak in April 2023. Operations in Bahri began with SAF forces entering via the Halfaya Bridge on September 26. The army successfully gained control of several residential areas, including Azergab, Halfaya, Kadaro, and Doroshab, and was able to deliver supplies to the previously besieged Hattab military base.

On 18 January 2025, the SAF reached the Al-Shukri junction in Shambat, while the RSF retreated by one kilometer southwards to the Hassan Ibrahim Malik University City.

On 20 January 2025, SAF units besieged at the Signal Corps garrison in Bahri launched their first major offensive since September 2024, forcing the RSF to withdraw east towards the Kafouri neighborhood. The SAF also retook Abboud Park in Bahri, the Juwayriyah School, and the African Council Schools in Al Safiya district.

SAF forces launched a coordinated advance into eastern Bahri in late January 2025, specifically targeting the Teiba El Ahameda neighborhood. Concurrent operations by SAF forces reportedly secured several strategic locations in southern Bahri, including the El Danagla and El Amlak neighborhoods, as well as the El Diyar El Gatariya Company area. The SAF also captured the north entrance of the Mek Nimir bridge, a vital crossing point connecting Khartoum North with Khartoum proper. The SAF also successfully broke the RSF siege of the SAF Signal Corps and established a connection between their bases in northern and southern Khartoum Bahri. Additionally, SAF forces regained control of the strategically important Al Jaili refinery north of Khartoum. The refinery had caught fire on 23 January, with both sides accusing each other of starting it. Simultaneous operations targeted the suburbs of Dardoq and Nabta in the eastern sector of the city.

Several facilities in Bahri were damaged during the offensive, including the Khartoum Bahri water station, the state's largest with a capacity of 300,000 cubic meters per hour, the police headquarters complex, and the Khartoum Bahri Teaching Hospital, the state's third-largest medical facility. The al-Baraha Hospital was destroyed by fire.

On 31 January 2025, Basha Tabig, the advisor to the RSF Commander, claimed that the RSF had accomplished “a crushing victory” against the offensive by repelling an advance on El Izba, forcing the SAF to withdraw to the Samarab area. On the same day, RSF Commander Hemedti released a video statement admitting to facing setbacks in the region and Khartoum, but vowed to retake lost ground.

== Casualties ==
On 30 January 2025, the United Nations Human Rights Office verified seven separate incidents resulting in at least eighteen civilian deaths, including one woman. The killings were attributed to SAF-associated fighters and allied militia groups, particularly in the vicinity of the Al Jaili oil refinery. Many victims were identified as being originally from Sudan's Darfur and Kordofan regions. Video footage showed individuals in SAF uniforms and members of the Al-Bara' ibn Malik Battalion publicly reading a list of alleged RSF collaborators, announcing "Zaili" (Arabic for "killed") after each name. Additional video evidence documented members of the Al-Bara' ibn Malik Battalion making explicit threats of violence against El Hadj Yusif residents in the East Nile area.

UN High Commissioner for Human Rights Volker Türk issued a statement the following day expressing deep alarm over the executions, characterizing them as potential war crimes while demanding further investigation into each report and the immediate cessation of attacks on civilians.

== Analysis ==
The Sudan War Monitor described the offensive as a "turning point" in the civil war due to its advancements eliminating threats to the SAF headquarters while positioning the army for further operations to recapture the capital. By the end of March 2025, the Sudanese army had reestablished complete control of Khartoum and its environs.
