= Battle of Khartoum (2023–2025) =

Major battle of the Sudanese Civil War

Coordinates: 15°31′35.88″N 32°32′26.31″E

- Part of the Third Sudanese civil war
- The situation in Khartoum on 17 February 2025, following the 2024–2025 Bahri offensive Sudanese Armed Forces (SAF) control Rapid Support Forces (RSF) control
Date	15 April 2023 – 20 May 2025 (2 years, 1 month and 5 days)
Location	Khartoum and proximity, Khartoum State, Sudan
Result	SAF victory
Territorial changes	SAF captures the capital Khartoum by 26 March 2025; SAF takes full control of the state by 20 May 2025.

Belligerents
Sudanese government; Sudanese Armed Forces; Popular Resistance; Al-Bara Battalion; AWB	(Sudan) Government of Peace and Unity (from April 2025); Rapid Support Forces

Commanders and leaders
Abdel Fattah al-Burhan; Shams al-Din Kabbashi; Yasser al-Atta; Abdelrahman El Tayeb †; Ayub Mustafa †; Alzafer Omar; Mohammed al-Tijani Suleiman; Abu Aqla Kikil (from February 2025); Nasr al-Din Abdel Fattah	Hemedti; Rahmtalla al-Mahdi †; Osman Mohamed; Abu Lulu

Units involved
Sudanese Armed Forces; 18th Infantry Division; Central Reserve Forces; 9th Airborne Division; two Airborne Brigades; 144th Special Forces Battalion; Sudan Shield Forces (from February 2025); Popular Resistance; Al-Bara' ibn Malik Battalion; Angry Without Borders	Earthquake Division

Strength
Unknown	120,000 total fighters (14 April 2023, per SAF): 67,135 fighters; 39,490 recruits; 2,950 vehicles 104 armored personnel carriers 171 vehicles with machine guns

Casualties and losses
- 46,000+ violent deaths 61,000 killed overall 309 missing (as of February 2024); 3,664,988 displaced (as of June 2024)

The Battle of Khartoum was a major strategic battle for control of Khartoum, the capital of Sudan, with fighting in and around the city between the paramilitary Rapid Support Forces (RSF), and the Sudanese Armed Forces (SAF), as part of the civil war. The battle began on 15 April 2023, after the RSF captured Khartoum International Airport, several military bases, and the presidential palace in an attempted coup d'état, starting an escalating series of clashes. The battle was also the longest continuous battle in Sudanese history, the longest battle in an African capital ever, the longest in North African history and is one of the deadliest recorded battles in Sudanese and African history, with over 61,000 deaths. The battle was also marked by its gruelling urban warfare.

It was initially reported that tensions rose in Khartoum and Merowe on 13 April 2023, when RSF forces mobilized. In response, the SAF issued a statement saying "There is a possibility of a confrontation between SAF and RSF forces" introducing fears of a wider conflict. In the evening of 14 April 2023, RSF forces assaulted the Khartoum International Airport, a military base, and the presidential palace. The fighting spread from Khartoum into its suburbs, primarily Omdurman, where its bridge on the White Nile was largely captured by the RSF forces. On 26 March 2025, the SAF claimed victory after expelling RSF forces from most of Khartoum, including the airport and the presidential palace.

== Background ==
Khartoum is the capital and largest city in Sudan, with over 5 million residents. The Khartoum metropolitan area is made up of three main areas: Khartoum, Omdurman to the northwest, on the west bank of the Nile, is the second most populous city in Sudan, and Khartoum North, colloquially known as Bahri, located north of Khartoum itself.

While the Khartoum area has experienced civil unrest, violent protests and state repression, the area usually has been spared from warfare, with a major exception being the 2008 Omdurman attack by the Justice and Equality Movement during the War in Darfur.

In 2013, the Janjaweed, a pro-Bashir militia composed predominantly of Arabs and notorious for their role in the Darfur genocide, was organized into the paramilitary Rapid Support Forces to fight rebels in the Nuba Mountains. The RSF is led by Mohamed Hamdan Dagalo, also known as Hemedti.

In 2019, popular uprisings against the Omar al-Bashir regime began across Sudan, especially in Khartoum. The Sudanese government, aided by the RSF, shot at protesters, killing dozens of people over a period of several months in Khartoum and Omdurman. The deadliest incident was in Khartoum on 3 June, where Sudanese soldiers and the RSF killed over 100 civilians protesting the regime. Bashir was eventually overthrown, and a transitional civilian-military administration was put in place, with Abdalla Hamdok becoming the Prime Minister of Sudan and Abdel Fattah al-Burhan becoming the Commander in Chief of the Sudanese Armed Forces and the Chairman of the Transitional Sovereignty Council.

In 2021, Burhan, along with Hemedti, overthrew the civilian administration in the 2021 Sudanese coup d'état, cementing military rule over Sudan. By 2023, tensions between Burhan and Hemedti increased after Burhan's pressure to integrate the RSF into the Sudanese military, whereas Hemedti preferred autonomy for the RSF. On 13 April, rumors spread of RSF fighters mobilizing at bases in Khartoum and Merowe. By 14 April, both groups had tens of thousands of fighters in Khartoum each. These tensions came to a head on 15 April 2023, after RSF fighters attacked civilian and military sites across the nation, including Khartoum and Omdurman.

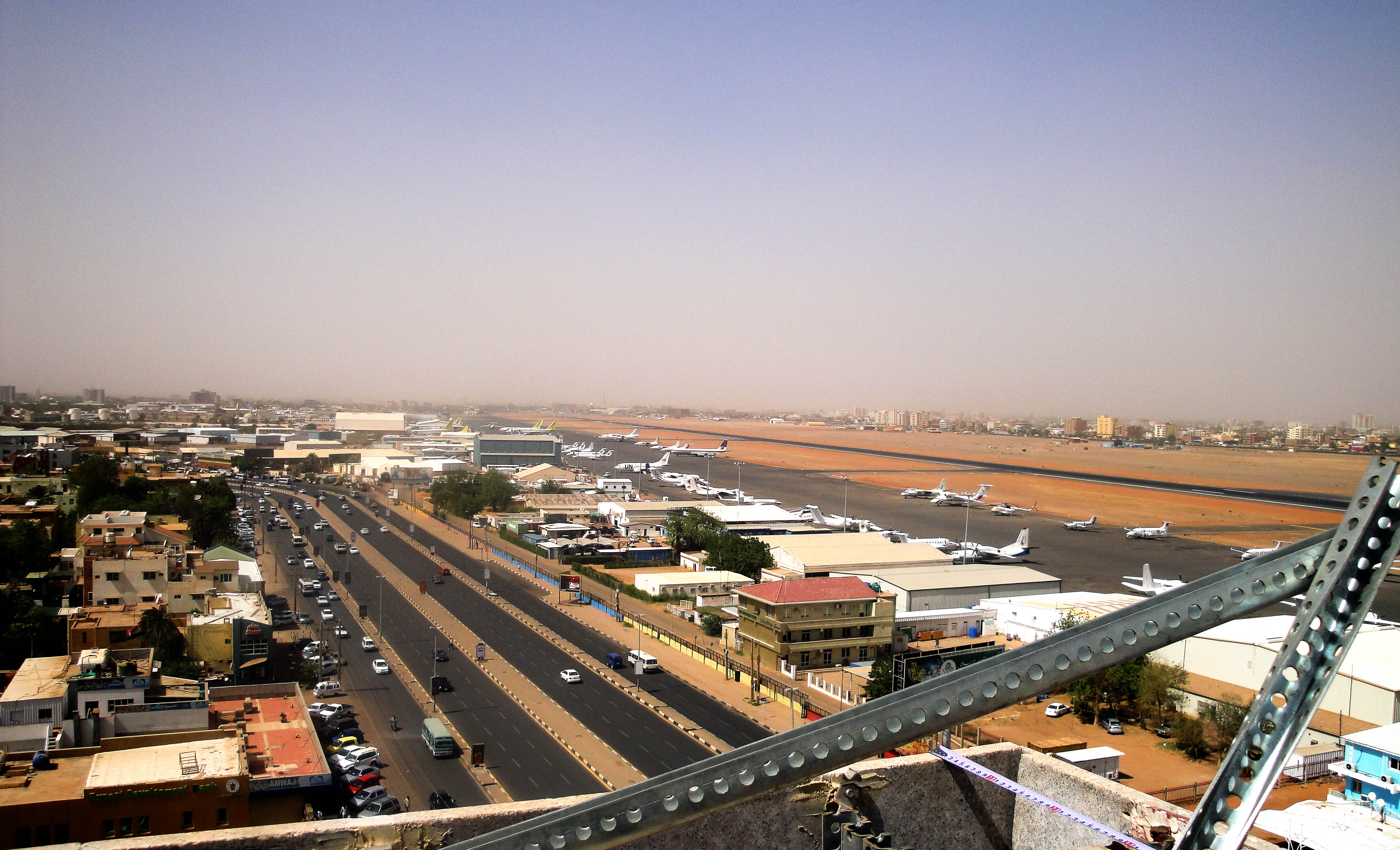
Khartoum International Airport, where the first attacks were reported on 15 April 2023, was under RSF control until March 2025.

== Outbreak of war ==
=== Initial attacks on Khartoum Airport and Omdurman, 15–17 April ===
In the early hours of 15 April 2023, the Rapid Support Forces initiated a series of assaults on key installations in Khartoum, including the Khartoum International Airport. During the attack on the airport, the RSF reportedly fired on a Saudia airliner which was arriving at the airport, but no casualties were reported among the aircraft's passengers and crew. In the fighting at the Khartoum airport, two civilians were killed. The RSF also captured the presidential palace, the residence of former Sudanese president Omar al-Bashir, and attacked a military base. Hemedti claimed that the RSF controlled most of the city's government buildings; this was disputed by Burhan.

RSF military operations in Khartoum from April to July 2023

RSF fighters stormed Burhan's residence as well on 15 April, attempting to assassinate him. Burhan and his bodyguards fought back, with a bodyguard later stating that Burhan himself picked up an AK-47 and shot at the RSF. Though Burhan escaped, over 30 of his bodyguards were killed in the clashes.

The same day, several aerial attacks towards the RSF targets were conducted by the SAF. Users on Facebook Live and Twitter documented the Sudanese Air Force flying above the city, and striking the RSF targets. On 16 April, the Armed Forces claimed to have re-captured the presidential palace, a claim disputed by the RSF who posted a video on Twitter of their continued presence in the palace amidst ongoing fighting. The RSF also disputed claims that several other buildings had been captured by the Armed Forces. The Interior Ministry building was also said to have come under RSF occupation.

On 16 April, General Yassir El Atta announced that all RSF camps in Khartoum were under SAF control, along with Port Sudan, El-Gadarif, and Kosti. This could not be independently verified at the time. However, new RSF camps popped up, such as in the All Saint's Cathedral on 17 April.

On 17 April, students from Comboni College of Science & Technology were evacuated after fighting reached the campus. That same day, the Forces of Freedom and Change stated that negotiations between Hemedti and Burhan had ceased. In a statement, Hemedti claimed to be fighting against Islamists, and championing himself as a leader of democracy. Students at other universities were forced to flee following attacks and clashes at their campuses. At the University of Khartoum, one student, Khalid al-Tageea, was buried on campus after being killed by a shell, as transporting his body was impossible.

The Khartoum Teaching Hospital, one of the largest in the city, was besieged by the RSF. It shut down completely on 17 April along with the sister al-Shaab Teaching Hospital after sustaining damage from RSF shelling. In al-Moallem hospital, residents and staff were forced to flee following RSF attacks on the hospital. Staff alleged the shelling was deliberate. In Bahri's International Hospital, the director took to social media for fuel donations as power had been cut to the neighborhood.

By 18 April, there were 39 of the 59 hospitals in Khartoum that were out of service, and the remaining 20 were in Omdurman.

==== International incidents and reactions ====
On 17 April, the Sudanese government announced the closure of Sudan's airspace, initially limited solely to Khartoum. Aidan O'Hara, the European Union ambassador to Sudan, was assaulted at his Khartoum home where he had been sheltering. The EU declared the attack, "a gross violation of the 1961 Vienna Convention." The same day, a US diplomatic convoy was fired upon in an incident labeled as "reckless" by Antony Blinken. General al-Burhan declared the Rapid Support Forces a "rebel group", and ordered their nationwide dissolution. On 17 April, South Sudanese president Salva Kiir cancelled a planned trip to Khartoum due to the fighting. RSF forces also besieged and shelled a large hospital in the city. The World Food Programme also halted operations in the country.

==== Omdurman ====
A doctor in Omdurman stated the situation was hectic and everyone was seeking shelter. RSF forces laid siege to the Sudanese Broadcasting Corporation headquarters in the city, and began shelling places where SUNA broadcasts. Shelling continued throughout Omdurman on 16 April. Many airstrikes came from the Sudanese Air Force against RSF bases across the city. That same day, RSF forces managed to enter and capture the SUNA building, and began airing pro-RSF content. The RSF broadcasts ended on 17 April as clashes continued around the area. Despite pro-SAF media claiming that Sudanese forces recaptured the headquarters, the RSF posted a video confirming their continued control over it.

In other areas of Omdurman, RSF forces claimed to have vacated their base in the city. Videos from the city showed a barracks with dozens of wounded RSF fighters sprawled out across a makeshift barracks. Clashes also broke out on both ends of the Halfaya Bridge, one of several that connects Omdurman to Khartoum. In the battles on Halfaya bridge, a hospital on Khartoum's side of the river was shelled. Locals stated that there were so many dead near the bridge, it was impossible to recover their bodies. The safest areas of Omdurman were allegedly the working-class neighborhoods.

By 17 April, at least four people had been killed in clashes in Omdurman, according to the Sudanese Doctor's Union. Of the twenty hospitals in Khartoum and Omdurman, 12 were forced to close by 18 April due to indiscriminate shelling targeting the hospitals. That same day, Shams El Din Kabbashi, a member of the Sudanese sovereignty council, announced a 24-hour ceasefire between the SAF and RSF across the country. Locals in the Sabrin area of Omdurman stated many RSF fighters lay dead in the streets.

=== First ceasefire (18–20 April) ===
A ceasefire was announced on 18 April, but was ineffective. While it was set to go in effect at 6pm, fighting was still ongoing around the military headquarters, and the Republican Palace. Residents of Bahri also stated that fighting was occurring in their neighborhood, and wounded civilians were trapped in their homes. Some residents were out and about, and humanitarian agencies stated it was still impossible to provide aid. The Khartoum State Ministry of Health stated that most medical facilities were on the verge of shutting down due to the crisis. Satellite images on 19 April showed several key sites in the Khartoum area shelled or destroyed. These included the Security Service of Sudan, the Ministry of Education and Scientific Research, the General Command, Kobar Bridge, and several other government offices. On 18 April, the Sudanese Army also stated that they dissolved the RSF, although this was in name only. In Khartoum in particular, SUNA stated that the SAF was attempting to minimize civilian losses to lives and property from SAF airstrikes.

On 19 April, battles continued in Khartoum near the army headquarters, the presidential palace, and the airport, with heavy weapons used. The Sudanese Army said it was attacked by the RSF at its general command headquarters, but had repelled the attack, inflicting "heavy losses" on the RSF, which had reportedly abandoned 24 vehicles. The SAF called on RSF forces to surrender with the promise of pardons. Observers determined that the army was controlling access to Khartoum and trying to cut off supply routes to RSF fighters. Witnesses said the army reinforcements were brought in from near the eastern border with Ethiopia. When another ceasefire was announced to begin at 18:00 local time, fighting was reported to have mostly subsided around Khartoum airport, but continued to be intense around the Presidential Palace, army headquarters, and in the Jabra neighborhood in western Khartoum, where houses belonging to Hemedti and his family were located. Fighting was reported to have continued several minutes after the start of the ceasefire.

A Reuters reporter in Khartoum, stated that by 20 April, the main market in Bahri was burnt to the ground, and many buildings in the center of the city were destroyed or heavily damaged. Checkpoints by RSF fighters on blocks and the middle of city streets were frequent in Bahri and Omdurman, and civilian life was non-existent. Around the Halfaya Bridge, diplomats were evacuating the area, and buses taking residents to Egypt were stopping. These buses usually cost US$50, and increase on demand. Many residents fled to Port Sudan, Wad el-Madani, Chad, or Egypt. Around this time, many diplomats were evacuating Khartoum. Greek and Cypriot personnel sheltered in a Greek Orthodox cathedral in Khartoum, and Egyptian, Dutch, and Saudi foreign ministries all sent planes to airlift their nationals.

The RSF stated it repelled an SAF attack on positions in Omdurman on the morning of 20 April, claiming to have shot down two helicopters in the process. Fighting was also reported at the Sudanese Broadcasting Corporation headquarters in the city. RSF reinforcements approaching Khartoum from the west were blocked by Sudanese forces that same day. The main hotspots of fighting in Omdurman were in El Fitihab, Medinet El Nakhil, El Bustan, and the Libya Market Road. The RSF also had a heavy presence in the neighborhoods of El Mohandesin, Medinet El Nakhil, Aburiyal, El Salha, and blocks 18 and 19 of Ombada, west of Omdurman. The modus operandi of the RSF in Omdurman was hit-and-run attacks, with ambushes on SAF soldiers and then hiding in residential areas and houses.

In Khartoum that same day, RSF forces gained control of the roads leading to El Gezira, along with the roads leading to Soba Bridge. Locals mentioned that the RSF were in control of the Soba army garrison, and were actively fighting for the road to El Kamleen. Despite the Eid al-Fitr ceasefire announced by both sides on 21 April, shelling and fighting still occurred in and around the General Command, the Republican Palace, and south of Khartoum International Airport. Clashes broke out again along the Qawmy Road, the one connecting Khartoum to Gezira which had fallen under RSF control the day prior. Fighting was also reported in al-Bagair, an industrial area on the western side of the Nile, along with airstrikes in Bahri. Analysts predicted that the RSF had moved to hit-and-run tactics, and that there "were no strongholds" left in the Khartoum area for the group.

=== Eid al-Fitr ceasefire (21–26 April) ===
On 21 April, the Khartoum 1 and 2 Resistance Committee stated that a large number of foreign nationals and diplomats were stuck in Bahri and had no way to get out. The group requested immediate aid, and stated RSF attacks and clashes intensified that day despite the Eid ceasefire. The fighting continued into 22 April, with heavy shelling reported in Ombda and Karari, north of Khartoum. Shelling from the Corps of Engineers in Ombada Mansoura killed six people. (Note: It is unknown whether the SAF or RSF perpetrated the shelling, as it is unknown who controlled the Corps of Engineers at the time of shelling.) In central Khartoum, the fighting spread from the downtown to the neighborhoods of Hillat Hamad, Khojaly, and Arkaweet. The Sudanese army also continued air campaigns against RSF hideouts, reportedly preparing for intensified urban warfare. Clashes also spread around Khartoum, on the roads linking Khartoum to Wad al-Madani and Darfur. The Rapid Support Forces also released a statement accusing the SAF of attacking positions in Bahri, and claiming to have repulsed those attacks. The Republican Palace was also reportedly still a battleground.

The al-Huda prison was attacked by the RSF sometime around 23 April, releasing all of the prisoners located at the facility, allegedly including former Sudanese president and war criminal Omar al-Bashir. In the attack, the guards were killed. Other notable convicts were serving time for perpetrating war crimes throughout the War in Darfur. The Omdurman Women's Prison was also bombed around the same time, allowing many inmates to escape. On 23 April, at least 50 people were killed in the Khartoum area, and four were killed on 24 April. The Qatari and French foreign ministries were also attacked and looted on 24 April, which the SAF accused the RSF of. A Sudanese-American journalist speaking to CNN stated that he and 29 others were sheltering in a building in downtown Khartoum, and were running low on all supplies, including food and water. An ACLED report showed that nearly 50% of all violent events of the War in Sudan between 15 and 24 April were based in Khartoum State.

Clashes continued around the area of the General Command and the Republican Palace. The WHO representative to Sudan stated that on 25 April, one side had seized control of a national health lab in Khartoum that held biological materials including polio, measles, and cholera isolates, and that the group had ejected all technicians. The WHO did not mention which side took control, although the lab was close to fighting between the RSF and SAF. The Sudanese Ministry of Health also stated that the medical system in the country had collapsed by 24 April. Protests also broke out against both the SAF and RSF in Dardoug, northern Bahri, and Karari.

==== International evacuation efforts ====
Around 100 US special forces flew from Djibouti on 22 April and evacuated the American embassy in Khartoum. The UK, Germany, and other nations also began the initial stages of evacuating diplomats from the city. That same day, Sudanese spokesperson Nabil Abdallah announced Jordanian, Hungarian, and other nationals all were evacuated. Saudi and Dutch nationals were also in the process of being evacuated. French evacuation efforts were hindered after a convoy of French diplomats came under fire in the city. Despite this, Italian and Spanish diplomats were able to evacuate, with the Spanish mission evacuating Argentine, Colombian, Irish, Portuguese, Polish, Mexican, Venezuelan, and Sudanese diplomats. Canadian nationals were also evacuated. Turkish nationals evacuated from the city of Wad al-Madani, but efforts were postponed after an explosion near the evacuation site.

Egypt's foreign ministry stated on 24 April that an Egyptian diplomat, Mohamed al-Gharawi, was shot and killed in Khartoum while evacuating. Egypt accused the RSF of killing Gharawi. China, the Philippines, Sweden, Norway, Belgium, Libya, India, Russia, Australia, and Japan all were in the process of evacuating their nationals, either from Khartoum or other cities like Port Sudan. Uganda evacuated 300 Ugandan nationals from Khartoum to the Ethiopian city of Gondar by 24 April.

=== Extended ceasefire and aftermath (27 April – 10 May) ===
On 26 April, two shells fell on the al-Roomy medical center in Omdurman, injuring twenty people. The RSF also attacked Kober prison in Bahri the same day, where many putschists from the 1989 Sudanese coup d'état were imprisoned, but the attack failed, and the SAF took control of the prison. Later, several pro-Bashir hardliners from his administration, including Ahmed Haroun, Ali Osman Taha, Awad El Jaz, and Nafi Ali Nafi, were reported to have escaped. The RSF blamed the SAF, which the SAF denied. In the aftermath of the ceasefire, Khartoum residents also stated that gangs were stealing from abandoned or damaged houses, and threatening residents.

Clashes on 27 April were centered in several localities, despite claims by Sudanese and RSF officials that the Eid al-Fitr ceasefire would be extended starting that day. On Tuti Island, a neighborhood in Khartoum where the Blue and White Nile converge, sporadic clashes occurred. Locals also mentioned a resurgence in fighting near the General Command, the Republican Palace, east of the Khartoum International Airport, the Kafouri neighborhood of Bahri, and parts of Omdurman. In Kafouri, much of the fighting came from Sudanese air force bombing RSF targets in the neighborhood. In El Jereif neighborhood, shelling fired from a nearby SAF base killed three people. On 28 April, Turkish authorities stated that an evacuation plane was hit by gunfire while flying out of Wadi Seidna Air Base.

The Sudanese Armed Forces announced on 28 April that al-Bashir was being treated at Aliaa Hospital in Khartoum, along with other pro-Bashir former politicians like Bakri Hassan Saleh, Abdelrahim Hussein, Ahmed Tayib El Khanjar, and Yousef Abdelfattah. The Sudanese Army also deployed the Central Reserve Forces, a police force in Sudan, to Khartoum to help the SAF on the ground. The RSF claimed a group of CRF in al-Shajara had also defected to their side. The El Baraha hospital in Bahri was bombed on 29 April, bringing the total of bombed hospitals since 15 to 16 April in the Khartoum area, and 19 other hospitals stormed and converted to military bases by the RSF. The Sharg El Nil Hospital in Khartoum, one of the largest in Khartoum, was raided by the RSF days prior and converted into a military base. On 30 April, the Sudanese Army claimed to have destroyed RSF convoys entering western Omdurman. The army, along with the CRF, launched an offensive in southern Khartoum, claiming to have secured territory from the RSF. That same day, the Souq El Sha'abi was destroyed, along with several main banks in Khartoum ransacked.

By 1 May, only one hospital of the 86 in the Khartoum area was able to work at maximum capacity. That same day, SAF continued their bombing campaign in Kafouri, and bombed Bahri's al-Inqaz street. The RSF also consolidated control over Sharq En Nil hospital, which they stormed a few days prior. The SAF continued bombing campaigns against RSF-controlled hospitals, including the Shambat Medical Department headquarters in Shambat. In the Shambat strike, the RSF alleged that wounded civilians were killed. The group also accused the SAF of shelling Shambat from the Omdurman military hospital.

On 2 May, Burhan and Hemedti agreed to starting negotiations mediated by UNITAMS and the African Union. Water and electricity to Khartoum's El Kalakla neighborhood were also cut off. Asia Abdelmajid, one of Sudan's first actresses, was killed in Bahri on 4 May. That same day, the RSF claimed to have control over 90% of the "three cities", although this claim couldn't be confirmed at the time. Both sides agreed to a tentative ceasefire and humanitarian corridors later in the day.

Burhan and Hemedti traveled to Jeddah, Saudi Arabia to begin the first round of negotiations on 6 May. A tentative nationwide ceasefire was announced as well. At that same time in Khartoum, the Sudanese army repulsed an RSF attack attempting to storm the command of the Sudanese Air Force. Clashes also continued around the Republican Palace and along Airport Street in Khartoum. Muslim authorities in Omdurman issued a fatwa against looting as RSF checkpoints intensified looting of civilians in the streets. On 8 May, the Sudan Liberation Movement – Minni Minnawi faction that was stationed in Omdurman deployed to El Fasher to protect civilians from fighting in the Battle of El Fasher. By 8 May 481 civilians had been killed and over 2,560 wounded in the Khartoum area since fighting began.

On 9 May, the RSF accused the SAF of launching an airstrike that destroyed the Old Republican Palace. These claims were denied by the SAF. Pictures sent to the BBC by a Khartoum resident appeared to contradict the RSF's claims of the destruction of the old Presidential Palace but showed the offices in the New Republican Palace appearing to have been severely damaged by a fire. Clashes also broke out along the Halfaya bridge. In Omdurman, the Libya Market was completely destroyed, and the El Mohada neighborhood was raided by the RSF. Residents stated that on 10 May, the RSF was in control of the Omdurman Maternity Hospital and El Morada, whereas the Sudanese Army controlled old Omdurman south of the area. The Mahdi's tomb was hit by artillery as well.

=== Jeddah talks and Sharq en Nil offensive (11–21 May) ===
On 11 May, Bahri was calm. Residents of Sharq en Nil fled the neighborhood, however, following rumors of an offensive by both sides against the neighborhood. This offensive came to fruition on 13 May, when Sharq en Nil residents reported heavy bombardment. The Sharq en Nil hospital was destroyed by a Sudanese airstrike that same day. The army claimed that no civilians were killed or injured in the attack. Prominent Sudanese Shaden Gardood was killed in crossfire in al-Hashmab neighborhood on that same day. RSF fighters raided the headquarters of Sudanese newspaper El Hayat El Siyasi on 13 May, sparking condemnation by the Sudanese Journalists Syndicate. A large market in Omdurman was set ablaze the same day.

A factory that produced a peanut paste employed by the WFP to combat malnutrition in Sudan was burned down by the clashes on 14 May. That same day, the El Azhari and Bur'i El Dereisa mosques in Khartoum were bombed, killing one worshipper. Attacks on the Jabra hospital also forced the patients there to move somewhere safer. Airstrikes continued in Omdurman on 15 May, with residents stating the areas most affected were Salha and El Muraba'at neighborhoods. The RSF also alleged that the SAF bombed the Kandahar Cattle Market in western Omdurman. The Soba military base, one of the most important SAF military bases in Khartoum, was heavily targeted between 14 and 15 May, with shelling rocking the surrounding El Medina El Riyadiya and El Shegeilaab neighborhoods. RSF fighters also launched offensives in Bahri, with witnesses calling the situation "catastrophic." On 16 May, the RSF claimed to have captured 700 Sudanese soldiers in an attack on a SAF base in al-Jalil neighborhood.

==== Mar Girgis church attack ====
Gunmen raided the Mar Girgis Coptic church in Omdurman on 14 May, demanding gold and money from worshippers. Witnesses stated that the gunmen wore mismatched RSF uniforms, and shot at worshippers and nuns, wounding five. They also claimed that the attackers called the worshippers slurs, and threatened the priest with a dagger. The officer of the head of the Coptic Church in Sudan, Bishop Sarabamon, was present but not recognized by the attackers. Many offices and rooms were destroyed. The attackers returned on 18 May to continue raiding the church.

On 16 May, RSF militants raided the Episcopal Anglican Church in Khartoum, along with the Church of the Virgin Mary. The churches were then occupied, and used as military bases.

Burhan made his first appearance in Khartoum since the war broke out on 18 May, with videos emerging of him greeting SAF soldiers in the city. Later, Burhan appointed Malik Agar, former SPLM-N insurgent leader, to vide-deputy, and the Sudanese spokesman Shamseddin Kabbashi to his deputy in the battle of Khartoum. Lieutenant generals Yassir El Atta and Ibrahim Karima were both instated to deputy commanders-in-chief. Fighting flared up that same day and through 19 May in eastern Khartoum, with residents stating dead bodies of both combatants filled the streets after an airstrike on 30 RSF trucks. The SAF also began barricading southern Khartoum neighborhoods to protect from RSF attacks on SAF bases. On 19 May, the SAF abducted three members of the Bahri Resistance Committee and detained them at an unknown location. in another part of Khartoum, a doctor was detained by the RSF.

The RSF tried to advance towards the Wadi Seidna Air Base, north of the capital on 21 May. RSF fighters in about 20 trucks positioned east of the Nile were trying to cross a bridge to reach the airfield, but were met by heavy artillery from the SAF. While the battle for Wadi Seidna airbase had been going on for several days, the RSF advance was the largest assault. Heavy airstrikes also took place in southern Omdurman on 21 May, along with skirmishes in central Khartoum.

== Jeddah ceasefire ==
On 20 May, the SAF and RSF signed a week-long, nationwide ceasefire at the culmination of the talks in Jeddah. The ceasefire was set to be implemented on 22 May, lasting until 29 May. Initially, the ceasefire worked, with all three cities being largely peaceful aside. Small skirmishes occurred in all three cities, but air raids stopped. As many as 229 people were declared missing on 22 May in Khartoum, with search and rescue efforts being made to find them through the ceasefire.

The ceasefire broke down on the night of 23 May, as clashes broke out in Khartoum, Omdurman, and Bahri. Fighting occurred in El Mohandesin, Hamad El Nil, and El Rashideen, injuring several people. A battle also broke out on El Ghaba street in western Khartoum, with both the RSF and SAF declaring victory. They intensified on 24 May in Omdurman, as the RSF relaunched their campaign against the Wadi Seidna airbase. Despite this, humanitarian aid agencies increased efforts to rush supplies into Khartoum before wider fighting began. The RSF also shot down a Sudanese airplane in Ombada, arresting the pilot. Clashes in Khartoum occurred in the neighborhoods of al-Quz, al-Rumaila, al-Hilla al-Jadida, and El Shajara. In Omdurman, they occurred in al-Fatihab, al-Morada, and Banat. Following an RSF offensive on the SAF's Armored Corps headquarters, the RSF made large gains but they were reversed, and the SAF recaptured the Sudanese Mint.

On 26 May, 50 babies and toddlers died due to malnutrition and circulatory failure after their orphanage ran out of supplies. The day was otherwise peaceful in Khartoum. An RSF spokesman claimed Hemedti was on the ground in Khartoum leading the RSF, but this was unable to be verified. As sporadic clashes erupted between 26 and 29 May, a resident of Omdurman told The Guardian, "Is there a ceasefire? There's none." due to fighting in her area. Shelling occurred in northwest Bahri, along the Halfaya bridge, between those three days.

=== Civilian life in the ceasefire ===
Civilians in Khartoum often had to steal to survive, as all goods and services were near impossible to come by. Resistance committees made up the brunt of humanitarian aid in neighborhoods with heavy fighting, like Jabra. In many areas, disease was prevalent due to the heavy amount of decaying bodies left untouched in the streets. Water was near impossible to come by, and residents boiled water from the Nile. Retrieving water often meant putting themselves at risk of being shot by snipers. Street gangs were also common, with poorer neighborhoods being targeted. Prices of house staples also rose exponentially, with flour doubling in price, sugar rising to 50,000 Sudanese pounds (SDG) from 32,000, and cooking oil rising from 23,000 SDG to 35,000 SDG. Civilians in Bahri later began burying bodies through the aid of resistance committees, as the health ministry was nonexistent.

=== Jeddah ceasefire extension and the Battle of Taiba (29 May – 3 June) ===
The Jeddah ceasefire was extended on 29 May for another five days. In the renewed ceasefire, the United Nations was able to complete the first round of food donations throughout the war-torn parts of Khartoum. However, on 30 May, the Libyan embassy was raided by alleged RSF fighters. No one was hurt in the raid, as all Libyan nationals were evacuated on 13 May. In the fighting on 30 May, several civilians were killed and injured in Bahri. In another incident, five civilians were killed at the Abu Bakr Siddig mosque in Bahri near the Shambat bridge, in either crossfire or shelling. Several civilians were also killed in Bahri between Shambat Bridge and Halfaya bridge. Sheikh Abdelaziz El Bakri, the head of the National Umma Party in Khartoum State, was killed by the RSF after attempting to ease an argument between RSF fighters and civilians. That same day, the RSF captured the SAF's Strategia base in northwest Khartoum, effectively capturing all of northwest Khartoum.

On 31 May, the Sudanese Army announced its suspension of participation in peace talks, citing "repeated violations" of the ceasefire by the RSF. Despite this, the day was relatively quiet. The RSF stormed the offices of the El Midan newspaper in Khartoum, sparking condemnation from journalism organizations. That same day, shelling from the SAF-controlled neighborhood of El Shajara hit the relatively peaceful neighborhood of Mayo, where displaced Khartoum residents were seeking refuge. Twenty-seven civilians were killed in the attack, and over 106 were wounded.

Clashes on 1 June broke out around the Taiba camp in southern Khartoum, which pro-RSF social media accounts referred to as "the battle of the Onion." The Taiba camp was originally a major RSF base, but was vacated in the early days of the war. Because of this, fighting mainly took place in the outskirts of the camp and the surrounding town of Jebel Awlia. One of the Sudanese divisions participating, according to geolocated videos, was the 18th Infantry Division from Kosti. Al Jazeera reported on 3 June that the Sudanese Army was bringing in reinforcements to capture the Taiba camp and the town of Jebel Awlia.

On 1 June in Omdurman, clashes continued along the Mohandessin district, predominantly SAF air raids. El-Ghaba street in Khartoum was also a hotspot of violence, with Ombada and Hamad el-Nil also seeing fighting. The RSF captured the neighborhood of Al Nuzha on 2 June, along with consolidating control, over the al-Mogran neighborhood which they captured on 30 and 31 May. In the attack on al-Mogran, the RSF also captured the Arabic Market, Central Bank, GNPC tower, and the eastern side of al-Fatihab bridge. An SAF plane was also alleged to be destroyed on 3 June.

The RSF raided the National Museum of Sudan on 3 June, with videos emerging of parts of the museum being burned and artifacts being destroyed. Sudanese antiquities authorities reported that the RSF had vacated the museum by the next day, but the damage, combined with impending rains, threatened to destroy more of the museum. Another museum in Omdurman in the home of Abdallahi ibn Muhammad, the successor to Muhammad Ahmad and a rebel in the Mahdist War, was occupied by the RSF.

=== Ceasefire fails (4–9 June) ===
Clashes intensified in the Khartoum area after the Jeddah ceasefire extension expired on 4 June. That same day, shelling at an IDP camp in eastern El Jereif neighborhood killed three people and injured five others. Fighting also continued at the Taiba camp, but it was unknown who, if anyone, controlled the base. On 5 June, shelling towards the International University of Africa killed twenty-five Congolese students who were sheltering. The Congolese Foreign Minister Christophe Lutundula accused the SAF of being behind the shelling. Shelling that day also occurred near the Army Corps of Engineers, an SAF base in Omdurman, the El Moweileh neighborhood in western Omdurman, and the RSF base in Salah. In Khartoum, shelling near El Sahafa neighborhood injured 16 civilians. The water supply across all of Khartoum also was cut off due to the fighting. Previously, only Bahri and parts of Omdurman had had their water cut off. The SAF announced the capture of the Nujoumi air base in Jebel Awlia on 6 June, which is located near the Taiba base.

Tuti Island, an island and neighborhood in Khartoum, was also cut off and besieged by the RSF. Locals in the area stated the siege began on 30 May, and that due to a lack of food and supplies, the situation on the island was becoming a "humanitarian disaster."

==== Battle of Yarmouk factory ====
On 7 June, a fire broke out after clashes near Yarmouk factory, the largest weapons-producing factory in Sudan. The RSF alleged that the factory was also a weapons storage area for the SAF. The RSF attacked Sudanese trenches near the factory on 6 June, sparking the battle. The clashes had spread from the neighborhoods of Jabra, al-Shajara, and Abu Adam, which were the epicenters of fighting in southern Khartoum. The Sudanese army launched airstrikes and shelling towards the factory and oil depots in the neighborhood nearby, setting the depots and munitions on fire. The RSF released a statement later on 7 June claiming control over the Yarmouk factory, but residents and geolocated footage showed SAF soldiers in control of it on the night of 7 June. Analysts suggested that the attempts by the RSF to capture the Yarmouk factory and the oil depots were part of a wider goal to intensify their siege on the SAF Armored Corps base in al-Shajara. Others suggested that the RSF would attempt to attack Abu Adam and more of the neighborhood of al-Shajara. Following the battle of Yarmouk factory, SAF reinforcements arrived at the Armored Corps, but by 8 June, the RSF had already recaptured Yarmouk factory. The reinforcements came from the SAF's 17th division, 18th division, and elements of the 1st and 4th divisions.

In other areas of Khartoum on 7 June, SAF airstrikes continued over the El Moweileh neighborhood of Omdurman and clashes resumed in Sharq El Nil. In the El Moweileh market airstrike, 12 civilians were killed. In the neighborhood of Imtidad Nasir, the local resistance committee reported that three people were killed in an SAF air campaign. Casualties were also reported in El Fitihab and Karari neighborhoods of Omdurman. Over 20 people were killed in the Omdurman airstrikes and 24 were injured. That same day, the remaining orphans at Mygoma orphanage were evacuated. As a result of a lack of supplies, 71 children died since the start of the battle. On the night of 7 June, five worshippers at a mosque in El Safya neighborhood of Bahri were killed by shelling.

Fighting on 8 June broke out west of Bashair Teaching Hospital, one of the last few operational hospitals in the Khartoum area. The doctors at the hospital reported 150 wounded people admitted within the past 72 hours. Clashes also continued around the Yarmouk factory.

By 8 June, over a thousand people had been killed in the battle of Khartoum, with the number impossible to count due to the sheer number of bodies and inability to access them. Civilians took matters into their own hands, burying bodies whenever possible. While some of the bodies have been documented, many are in unmarked graves in city streets, the floors of houses, and backyards.

==== 9 June ceasefire ====
The SAF and RSF held a 24-hour ceasefire on 9 June after continued mediation with the US and Saudi Arabia in Jeddah. There were no reported clashes that day. Civilians used this time to stock up on food and other supplies, although those who had lost homes to the raids and occupations by the RSF expressed disappointment that they were unable to enter their homes. The ceasefire failed by 10 June, when clashes broke out in the Haj Youssef area of Bahri. Shelling and fighting also occurred in southern and central Khartoum, along with the area around Shambat Bridge, as soon as the ceasefire expired at 06:00. By that time, six out of the 88 hospitals in the Khartoum area were operational. As many as 2,800 civilians fled to Wad Madani during the ceasefire. The Sudanese Red Crescent society suspended operations in Khartoum following the end of the ceasefire on 10 June.

=== SAF offensive and resumption of Jeddah talks (11–17 June) ===
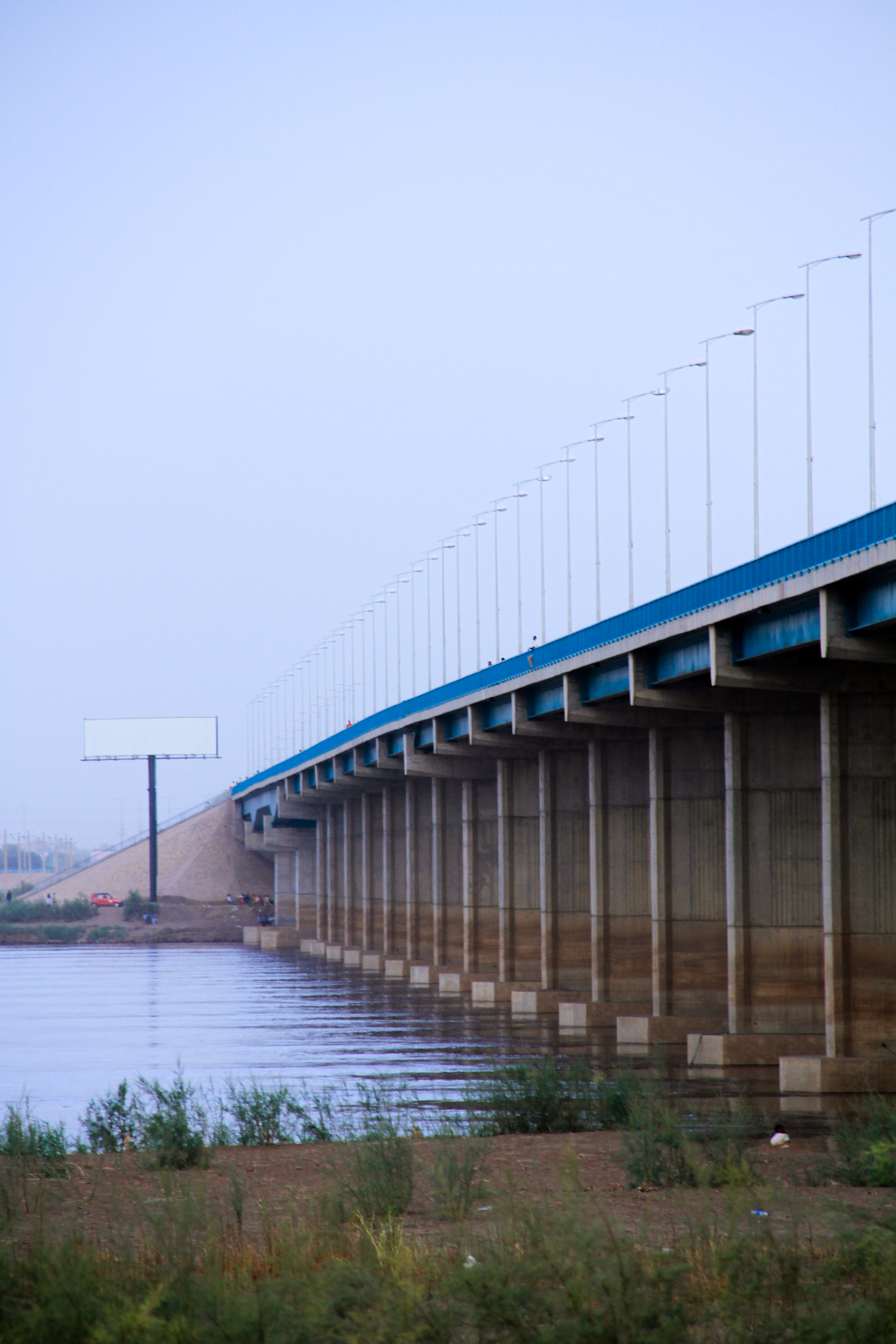
Halfaya Bridge before the war, looking in the direction of Khartoum.

The SAF launched an offensive in several areas of the three cities on 11 June. Initial clashes broke out along the Halfaya and Manshia bridges, Kafouri, the southern neighborhoods, and north of the Armored Corps. Both the RSF and SAF reported fighting on Al Shajara avenue, near the SAF Armored Corps, with the RSF alleging that they were tightening their siege on the corps. Resistance committees in Karari announced that fighting occurred at the SAF-controlled Halfaya bridge roundabout. The RSF also ambushed an SAF convoy between Haj Youssef and Kafouri. The SAF also launched attacks near Kobari Bridge from the Signal Corps. Shelling also occurred in the southern neighborhoods. Air raids occurred in El Ghaba street of Khartoum, El Salha of Omdurman, and Sharq En Nil of Bahri.

The SAF accused the RSF during the offensive of mixing in with civilians, and targeting civilian households in El Azhari and El Salama neighborhoods of southern Khartoum. The army also announced the death of Brigadier General Abdelrahman El Tayeb, who was killed during the battle for Halfaya Bridge. The SAF alleged that "dozens" of RSF were killed in the first stage of the offensive. Five people were killed in the shelling of El Azhari and El Salama. The next day, that toll grew to 18 people killed in the shellings. Three people were killed in the Muzdalifa and Maygoma areas of Bahri on 11 and 12 June as well.

On 13 June, RSF fighters stormed the residence of the Somali ambassador to Sudan. Clashes also continued around Halfaya and the Wadi Sayyidna airbase. RSF and Sudanese officers also targeted the sites of different newspapers and journalists across Khartoum in mid-June, with journalists from El Intibaha, El Tayar, and El Sharq El Awsat all being targeted. The next day, clashes continued in Haj Youssef and Sharq El Nil, both of which were under RSF control. Some fighting was reported in the El Mohandesin area of Omdurman and El Shajara in Khartoum, but otherwise, the day was relatively calm. Ceasefire talks between the RSF and SAF began in Djibouti, mediated by National Congress Party officials from the former al-Bashir regime. On 16 June, four siblings were killed in El Kadisiya, Sharq En Nil, and eight civilians were killed in Omdurman.

== Second Jeddah ceasefire ==
On the morning of 17 June, an airstrike in Yarmouk killed over 30 people, including five children, and destroyed 25 homes. Later that day, a ceasefire resulting from the renewed talks in Jeddah was implemented, with a span of three days. The following day, 18 June, was relatively calm in the three cities. Analysts warned that the ceasefire would be beneficial for helping the RSF regroup and mobilize. Despite this, normal life continued in the streets of Khartoum, a change welcomed by several Sudanese political parties such as the Sudanese Congress Party (NCP) and National Umma Party (NUP). Malik Agar, the vice-president of the Sudanese transitional council, warned of the imminent failure of the ceasefire.

The second day of the ceasefire also continued without incident. Homes occupied by the RSF were not vacated by the fighters, so some civilians were left homeless or forced to shelter with others. The RSF also accused the SAF of firing on an ICRC convoy carrying wounded soldiers. The SAF responded with timestamps of the convoy's movements, and alleged RSF snipers on Kober Bridge attacked the ICRC instead. Meanwhile, the residence of the Tunisian ambassador to Sudan was raided by alleged RSF militants.

=== Expiry of the ceasefire ===
The ceasefire expired on 21 June, with fighting erupting shortly before the deadline, and intensifying just 30 minutes afterward. The Fetihab, Um Badda al-Mansura, al-Doha, and Abbasia neighborhoods saw the most conflict in Omdurman. The RSF also launched attacks on the SAF-controlled Corps of Engineers, but with little success. The SAF also launched air raids in Mayo neighborhood of Khartoum, and Khartoum Stadium. The General Intelligence building caught on fire and was destroyed in the renewed fighting. The SAF also heavily shelled the Yarmouk area, which was still under RSF control. A statement released by the SAF alleged that the Central Reserve Police conducted a successful counterattack against the RSF in Khartoum and Omdurman.

Fighting continued into 22 June, with the clashes in Omdurman expanding to old Omdurman and western Omdurman. The northern neighborhoods of Omdurman, which saw the most conflict immediately post-ceasefire, were still contested as the SAF launched a counteroffensive against RSF sites in those areas of the city. The RSF claimed that it had downed a Sudanese MiG fighter, and that the SAF shelling of Omdurman the day before had killed three families along with worshippers in a mosque. Videos also emerged of the SAF's 9th Airborne Division participating in the offensive, along with the SAF still in control of the medical area north of the General Command despite recent RSF attacks. Hospitals in the Khartoum area, which had been able to finally receive aid during the ceasefire, were once again running low by 23 June.

==== Battle of the Central Reserve Police Headquarters ( 25–27 June) ====
The RSF claimed the capture of the Central Reserve Police force headquarters on 25 June. The group later released videos of captured ammo boxes, and claimed the capture of dozens of vehicles and tanks. The SAF denied these claims, stating that the RSF attacks failed, although on 26 June they acknowledged the RSF's capture of the base. At least 14 civilians were killed in the fighting since the ceasefire, and 217 more were injured. The fall of the base cut off SAF supply lines to the SAF base in El Shajara, along with the capture of the de facto headquarters of the Interior Minister of Sudan and chief of police since 15 April. Both the SAF and RSF claimed hundreds of soldiers on the opposing side were killed.

=== Eid al-Adha ceasefire (28 June – 2 July) ===
On 28 June, Burhan and Hemedti separately released statements announcing a unilateral ceasefire for Eid al-Adha. The RSF released 125 captured SAF soldiers during the truce announcement, following mediation with the Red Cross. Despite this, SAF air raids hit Omdurman on 28 June. One air raid in particular was deafening, although the source was unknown. Civilians speaking to Al Jazeera stated that the air raids targeted newly-formed groups of RSF fighters in southern Omdurman. Halfaya Bridge was targeted as well.

On 1 July, RSF fighters killed a medical worker at a hospital in Aldroshab, Khartoum North. The attack was a retaliation by Janjaweed and the RSF after a wounded commander they brought into the hospital died of his injuries. That same day, the SAF captured the al-Wasatia junction south of the Armored Corps, indicating a slight expansion of territory. At the end of the ceasefire, the RSF had been geolocated to be in control of several areas of Khartoum. The most notable locations were Manshia Bridge, the El Shajara gas deposits and refining facilities, the Republican Palace, and a presence in front of the SAF-controlled General Intelligence headquarters.

== Siege of Alia Hospital, El Mohandesin garrison and more ==
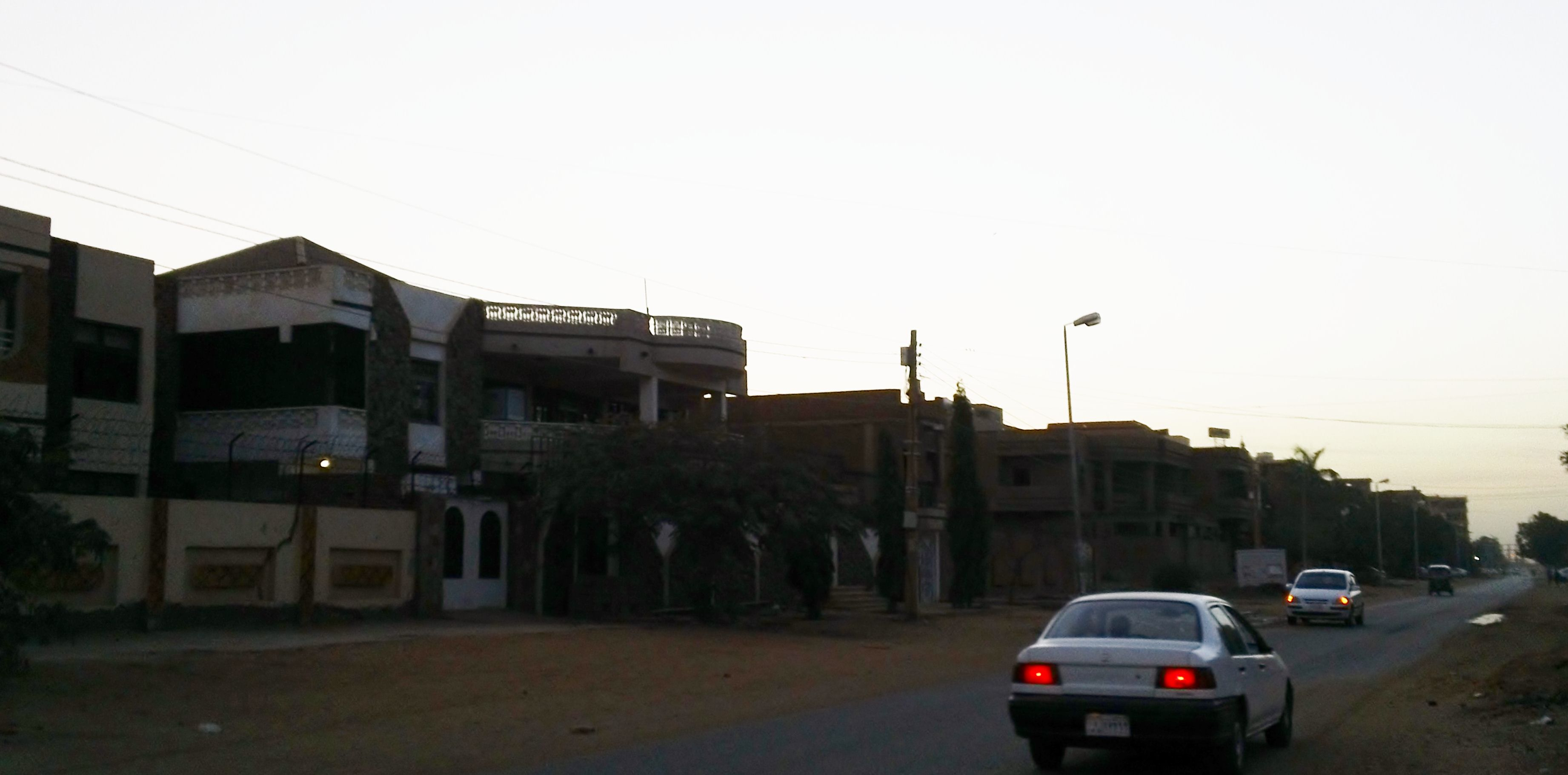
El Mohandesin neighborhood circa 2013, where the siege of Alia Hospital and the El Mohandesin garrison took place

The ceasefire expired on 2 July, leading to a massive RSF assault on an SAF base. In the attack, the RSF claimed the capture of five SAF soldiers. The RSF also began besieging the Alia Military Hospital, which was where Omar al-Bashir and other former NCP officials were believed to be located. The El Mohandesin garrison, which had been under siege since April, was also subjected to heavy bombardment by the RSF. Bakri Hassan Saleh, the former vice-president of Sudan under Bashir, was overseeing the SAF's defense of the Alia hospital. The RSF denied they were besieging Alia hospital, instead claiming they were only targeting El Mohandesin base. The El Mohandesin base was the last stronghold of the SAF's presence in central Omdurman, with the rest of the neighborhood being under RSF control.

The SAF responded to the attacks with heavy airstrikes on RSF positions surrounding El Mohandesin, with ground battles also taking place around the garrison. The RSF claimed to have shot down a Sudanese fighter jet as well. At least twenty-four people had been killed and over 100 injured in the battles, although it was unknown whether these were civilians or soldiers.

== Rest of 2023 (July to December) ==
=== July 2023 ===
Between 22 and 31 people were killed in an SAF airstrike on the Dar es Salaam district of Omdurman on 8 July. United Nations Secretary-General António Guterres condemned the attack.

On 13 July 34 civilians were killed in during artillery duels in the city. They were reportedly killed when the Sudanese army shelled a market in Omdurman. Three neighbourhoods of the city were shelled.

=== August 2023 ===
On 8 August, clashes broke out in the Abrof neighborhood of Omdurman between the Rapid Support Forces and Sudanese Army. Bombardment of the city has destroyed much of the old city. There were reports for gravediggers in the city to bury the dead in large mass graves.

On 20 August, an armoured corps base in El Mohandesin was attacked by the Rapid Support Forces.

=== September 2023 ===
On 5 September, Sudanese Army shelling reportedly killed at least 32 people in the Ombada neighbourhood. On 7 September, this was confirmed by the Sudanese lawyers group.

On 17 September, the Greater Nile Petroleum Oil Company Tower caught fire.

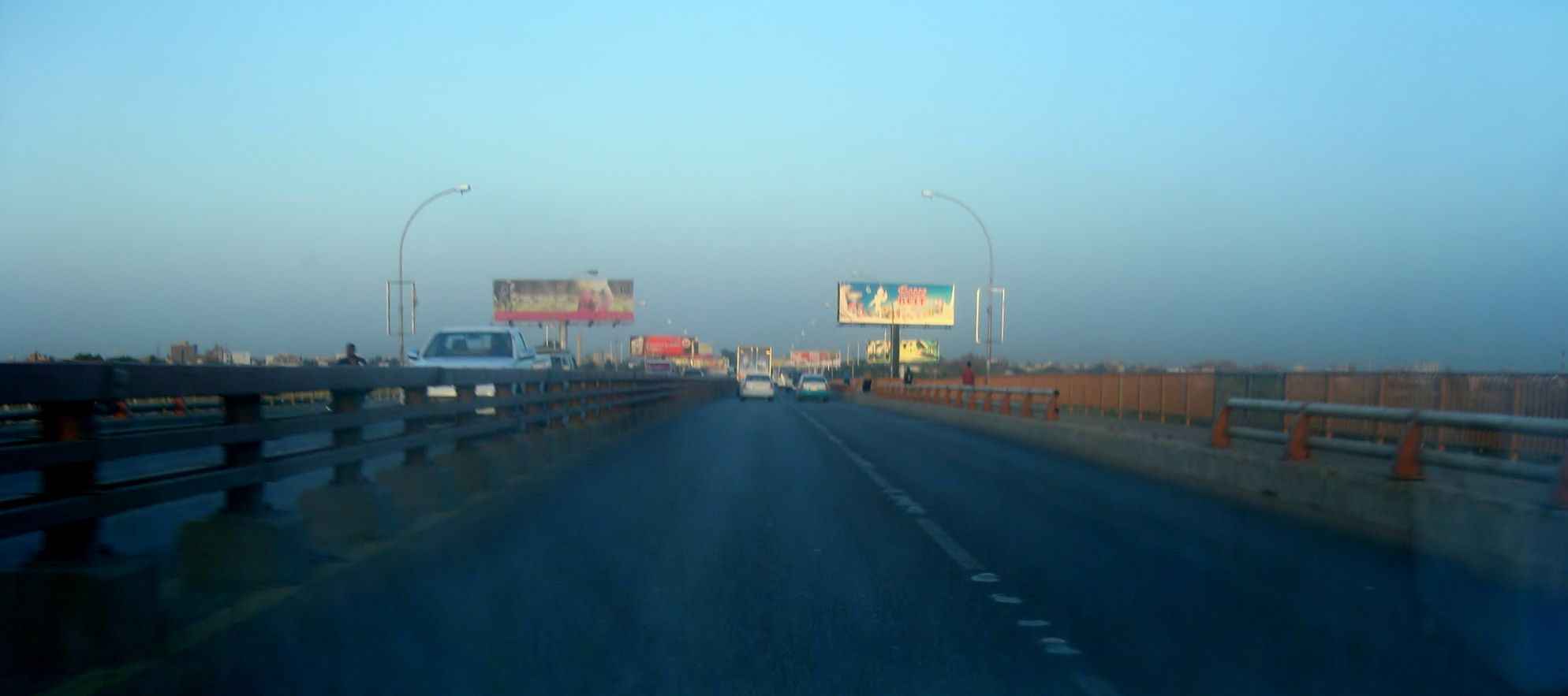
Shambat Bridge in 2011

=== November 2023 ===
On 11 November 2023, the Shambat Bridge was destroyed amid intense fighting.

=== December 2023 – January 2024 ===
On 6 December 2023, it was reported that the Rapid Support Forces destroyed the al-Jili Refinery, the largest oil refinery in Sudan which is located in Bahri (Khartoum North). On the same day both sides exchanged accusations of one another and on 24 December 2023 both sides once again accused each other, the General of the Sudanese Army, Abdel Fattah al-Burhan stated "The rebel militia today caused a fire in some facilities of the Khartoum refinery in al-Jili, as a result of its destruction of the refinery's control units." The Rapid Support Forces later claimed that the Sudanese Armed Forces were the perpetrators of the attack, which was proven false later on by sources.

== 2024 ==
=== February–March ===
The SAF gained ground in Omdurman in February, linking up their forces in the northern part of the city and relieving a 10-month siege of their forces in the city centre. The Omdurman front is the only area in Sudan where the SAF has carried out a sustained offensive operation, and represents its first major breakthrough of the war. As of 19 February 2024, the RSF remains in control of large parts of western and southern Omdurman.

On 12 March, the Sudanese Army claimed control of the national broadcasting building in the neighborhood of Old Omdurman in Omdurman from the Rapid Support Forces. On 14 March, it was reported that the Sudanese Armed Forces had taken more of Omdurman after a bloody offensive and it was later reported that clashes had occurred once more. On the same day the Sudanese Armed Forces reported that they had captured 14 South Sudanese and 3 Chadian mercenaries within Omdurman and captured a bridge.

On 28 March, Minni Minnawi announced that his forces would fight alongside the army in order to recapture the city and help in the army's growing offensive on the western part of Omdurman which they were later successful at.

=== April ===
During April, the battle remained primarily stable with reports of deaths caused by starvation across the area.

=== May ===
On 2 May, Khartoum State declared a state of emergency which was approved by General Abdel Fattah al-Burhan. On 19 May 2024 a video emerged of the RSF executing Mohamed Siddiq, a famous lieutenant in Sudan who gained prominence during the 2019 Sudanese Revolution. Real conflict only began in Khartoum again on 31 May when large clashes within Khartoum erupted. It was reported that the Sudanese Armed Forces had crossed a bridge which connected Omdurman and Khartoum North and entered into the city.

"The armed forces carried out a successful special operation at dawn today, destroying a large number of enemy vehicles and causing numerous casualties among the leaders and members of the Dagalo's militia. Our forces also managed to penetrate deep into enemy territory in Khartoum North and Halfaya." – Sudanese army spokesperson, Nabil Abdallah

Furtherly, an RSF spokesperson replied to the situation by saying that the Rapid Support Forces had shot down a plane of the Sudanese Air Force while the army tried to attack Khartoum North.

=== June ===
On 5 June, the Sudan Tribune confirmed that the Rapid Support Forces had assassinated Sudanese journalist, Muawiya Abdel Razzaq and his family in his home in Khartoum North. Violence continued in the area of Khartoum with large shelling on 7 June 2024 by the Rapid Support Forces killing at least 40 people in Omdurman. On 22 June 2024, the Rapid Support Forces accused the Sudanese Armed Forces of bombing the Bahri thermal power station that caused a huge fire.

=== July ===
By 2 July, the SAF recaptured the Doha neighborhood.

=== August ===
On 2 August, two people were killed and 13 were injured by shelling on the Central Market in Khartoum. On 4 August 2024, the SAF seized control of the Mansoura area and the western and northern fronts of the Engineer Corps. A week later on 17 August 2024, the SAF launched airstrikes on the Al Fazzarab neighborhood in Bahri for the first time, killing ten people.

=== 2024 Autumn offensive (26 September – 30 November) ===
After a period of relative calm in terms of the battle, on 26 September the SAF launched a major offensive to retake Khartoum. Air raids on RSF positions began at 2:00AM, followed by the army securing three main bridges, including the two that connect Omdurman with the capital. Heavy fighting was reported at the presidential palace, as well as several RSF compounds and facilities across the city. Heavy fighting was also reported at the Arab Market, the army's General Command headquarters, and near the army's Signal Corps south of Khartoum Bahri. It was also reported that army forces are simultaneously attacking Singa while performing air-strikes on Gezira State. During the offensive on 26 September, the SAF secured the neighborhoods of al-Kadru, al-Halfaya, al-Darushab, and al-Azariqab in Khartoum Bahri. The offensive has allowed formerly encircled and besieged SAF units in Northern Khartoum to link up with and be relieved by SAF units in the rest of the city. Additionally, the SAF performed airstrikes on the Nyala Airport, which killed 12 UAE soldiers assisting the RSF in setting up an anti-aircraft defense system.

In Khartoum, SAF secured its positions after crossing the bridges, and fighting continued in Mogran. By 2 October Abdel Fattah al-Burhan was personally overseeing the offensive from front-line positions between Omdurman and the Kadru military zone only leaving to visit the 3rd Infantry Division in Shendi following an attack on their base by RSF drones. Simultaneously the SAF where fighting to secure the Khartoum oil refinery in al-Jaili.

On 29 September, the residence of the Emirati ambassador, Hamad al-Janaibi, was allegedly bombed in an air strike carried out by the Sudanese army. The bombing was strongly denounced by the governments of Saudi Arabia, Kuwait, Oman, Bahrain, Qatar and Turkey, however, the SAF responded that it had never bombed the building and that "The armed forces do not carry out these cowardly acts and do not violate international law but target areas where the militia is present and that is within its right to defend the Sudanese nation." Aerial and satellite photographs published on 1 October and pictures taken outside the house days later appear to show no visible signs of damage to the building. Despite this the UAE plans to submit formal letters of protest to the League of Arab States, the African Union and the United Nations, accusing the SAF of violating the principle of diplomatic inviolability. In response the SAF has pointed out the UAE's continued support for the RSF, and covert UAE smuggling operations to get weapons to the RSF through Chad, as well as demanding an official retraction of the diplomatic inviolability claims.

On 1 October, the SAF was accused of allegedly executing dozens of military-aged civilian men in Khartoum Bahri for their support of the RSF. The National Umma Party denounced the executions, and the Beja Congress Party accused the al-Bara' ibn Malik Battalion of being the unit responsible. Human rights organizations within Sudan called the executions "a full-fledged war crime." On 2 October an SAF spokesmen denied that the SAF committed the executions saying the allegations where "false fabrications spread by the [RSF] and their political allies."

On 5 October, amidst escalations of conflict on Tuti Island, local residents pleaded for an urgent evacuation of civilians off the island stating that RSF units still on the island have resorted to looting and intimidation while the island has become a battleground due to the SAF advances. The RSF has only evacuated selected families with ties to the RSF.

On 9 November, the SAF announced its seizure of "13" and "al-Listik" stations in Bahri's Samrab district.

=== December 2024: Khartoum North (Bahri) offensive ===
On 7 December, it was reported that the RSF retreated from al-Safiya and areas in Shambat. By 12 December, the SAF seized full over the district of al-Samrab. The army used drones and warplanes in the offensive leading to the RSF withdrawal to the Kafouri district, east of al-Samrab. On the 14th, the Sudanese army pushed towards the al-Azba district, seizing neighborhoods and later the Sudanese Air Force bombed RSF locations in Bahri. The attacks by the Sudanese army began to intensify on 18 December when the army launched a surprise attack on Bahri.

On 23 December, the Sudanese army was reported to have pushed deeper into Khartoum North, advancing closer to the signal base which was reported to only be 4 kilometers to link the SAF troops.

== 2025 ==
=== January / February ===
On 7 January, the Sudanese army had made progress in Omdurman. It was reported that the RSF only remained in control in the Western part of Umbada and the remaining SAF in control of several other neighborhoods. The army also pushed into Southern Omdurman in addition to freeing three army officers.

On 24 January, the Sudanese army had broken a months-long siege on its General Command headquarters in central Khartoum and retaken the strategic al-Jili Oil refinery in Bahri, marking significant gains against the RSF after more than a year of war.

The SAF took full control of Bahri on 17 February.

=== March: SAF recapture of Khartoum ===
The SAF took control of East Nile on 3 March, reaching the al-Manshiya bridge connecting the city to Khartoum across the Blue Nile.

On 20 March, the SAF had advanced to within 500 meters of the Presidential Palace, tightening its grip. On the next day, SAF had confirmed its control over the Presidential Palace.

On 25 March, the SAF took control of Khartoum International Airport, after RSF forces retreated after SAF forces came closer to Jabal Awliya, which was RSF's last point of connection with Khartoum. The SAF subsequently took control of the Tiba al-Hassanab camp in Jabal Awliya, which was described as the RSF's last stronghold in Khartoum and its main base in central Sudan.

On 26 March, the chairman of the Transitional Sovereignty Council Abdel Fattah al-Burhan, announced at the presidential palace that the SAF had taken control of the city, stating that "Khartoum is free."

Later that day, The SAF also announced full control of the al-Manshiya Bridge and that it surrounded Jabal Awliya, towards which the RSF were reportedly retreating while they were still in control of the Jabal Awliya Bridge. Later, all bridges connecting the capital were stated to have been captured by the SAF, as well as the Jabal Awliya area. The RSF commented that its forces had not retreated, but only repositioned. On the same day, the RSF announced a military alliance with the Sudan People's Liberation Movement–North. 4 days later, the SAF then took control of the Libya Market in Omdurman, addressed by Nabil Abdallah.

=== April / May: SAF final offensive ===
On 3 April, Hemedti threatened to invade cities in Northern Sudan, as a response to army advances in re-occupying almost the entirety of the Butana.

On 8 April, the SAF captured parts of Ombada. On the same day, the Egyptian intelligence chief and the Sudanese president met after army gains, discussing repairing key bridges and dams.

On 20 May, the SAF took full control over Ombada and the rest of Omdurman, bringing an end to fighting in the Khartoum State. On the same day, it was announced that the RSF forces had also been expelled from the neighboring White Nile State, with RSF forces retreating into North Kordofan State. The RSF and its ally Sudan People's Liberation Movement-North (SPLM-N) were at the time present in 5 Darfur and the 3 Kordofan states (with the exception of limited pockets held by the SPLM-N and the RSF in Blue Nile State).

== Foreign involvement ==
=== Ukraine ===
On 19 September 2023, CNN reported that it was "likely" that Ukrainian special forces were behind a series of drone strikes and a ground operation directed against the Wagner Group-backed RSF near Khartoum on 8 September.

=== United Arab Emirates ===
The New York Times detailed how the UAE established logistical networks to supply the RSF through countries like Chad, Libya, and South Sudan, disguising weapons shipments as humanitarian aid.

== Humanitarian impact ==
The Rapid Support Forces (RSF), a paramilitary in Sudan, have been implicated numerous atrocities committed in the Sudanese capital of Khartoum since 15 April 2023, which is when both the Battle of Khartoum and the wider Sudanese civil war began. These atrocities have drawn widespread condemnation from various countries and human rights organizations, and are under investigation as potential war crimes and crimes against humanity.

The RSF established makeshift detention centres in and around Khartoum, where civilians, mostly young men, were detained, tortured, and in many cases executed. Multiple human rights organisations, including Amnesty International, have documented cases in which women and girls were raped, gang-raped, and held in sexual slavery by RSF fighters.

=== Civilian evacuations and warnings ===
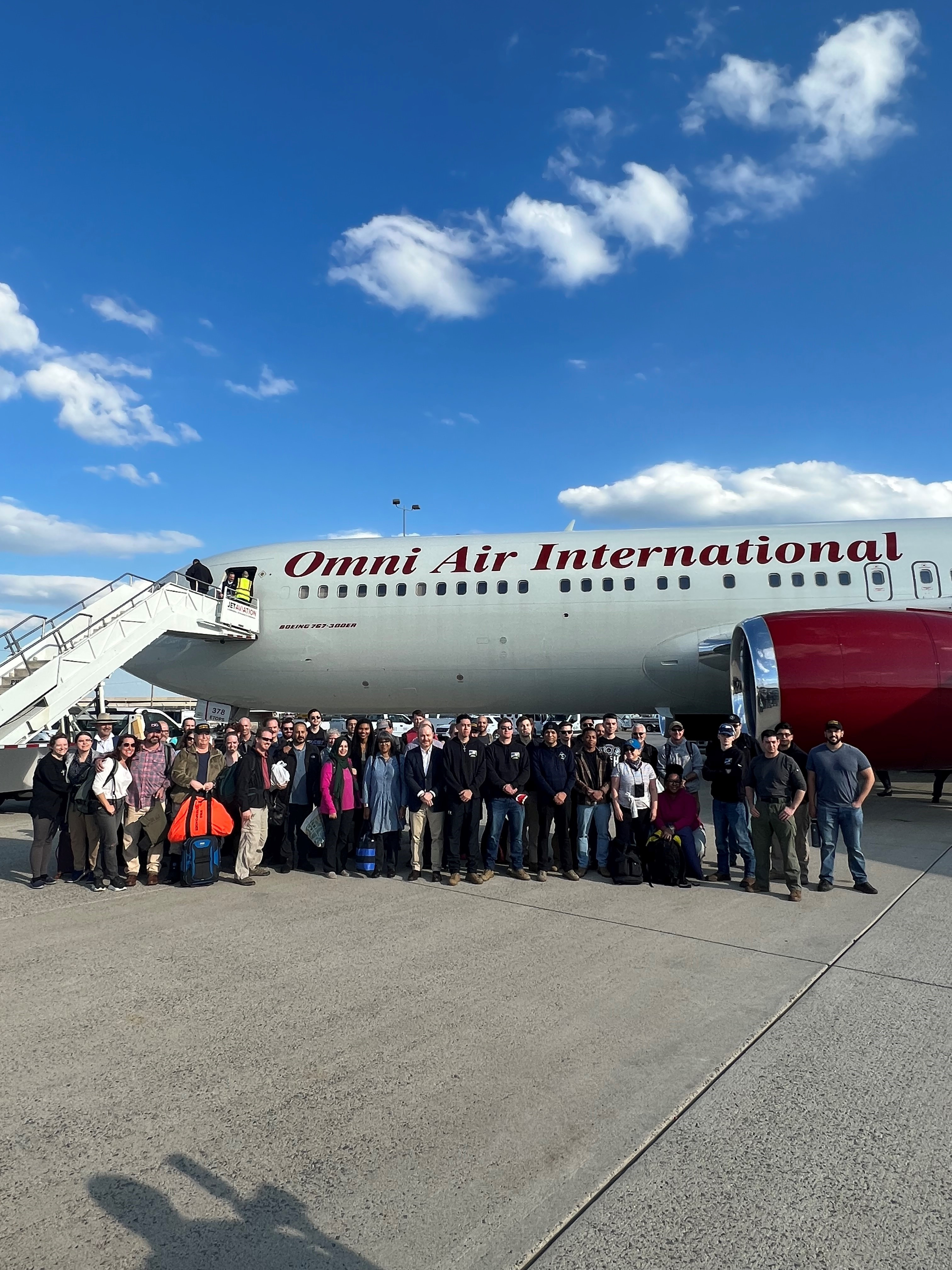
US embassy staff, who evacuated from Khartoum, as seen on their return to the US on 24 April 2023

Hours after the clashes began, evacuation orders were issued for civilians, politicians, and embassy workers. The US Embassy in Sudan urged US citizens in Sudan to seek shelter, as no plan of evacuation had been detailed. The Sudanese Air Force advised the millions of citizens to seek shelter immediately or stay at home. On 16 April 2023, a water crisis emerged in Khartoum, which worsened after the RSF urged civilians to evacuate the city. On 21 April, Indonesia evacuated 43 of its citizens to its embassy in Khartoum after an Indonesian citizen was injured by a bullet.

On 23 April, the United States managed to evacuate fewer than 100 of its citizens from Khartoum by three Chinook helicopters which landed near the US embassy. The operation included 100 US troops from the Navy SEALs and Army Special Forces who flew from Camp Lemonnier in Djibouti to Ethiopia and then into Sudan. On the same day, the Department of Foreign Affairs of the Philippines announced the suspension of all flights to Sudan to ensure the safety of its citizens and raised alerts to level 3 after a Filipino had been hit by a stray bullet in Khartoum. The Greek Orthodox Church of the Annunciation was used as shelter for civilians.

In June, nearly 180,000 civilians from the greater Khartoum area evacuated towards the Nuba Mountains, a scene of conflict between the Sudanese Army and Sudan People's Liberation Movement–North – al-Hilu faction.

Three Indonesian citizens were evacuated on 21 June 2023, during the second Jeddah ceasefire.

=== Civilian deaths ===
As of June 2024, the death toll estimation is over 61,000 deaths. Two Sudanese civilians at Khartoum International Airport were among the first reported, with 38 more deaths later reported during clashes in the city. Many civilians had been killed in the battle during looting by the RSF.

On 26 June 2023, the African Union issued a call to demilitarize Khartoum.

=== Rape ===
Doctors in Sudanese hospitals reported a drastic increase in rape reports during the battle, especially in Bahri. By June 2023, twelve incidents of sexual violence against 37 women were reported to UNHCR since the fighting began, with many of the incidents against young girls.

=== Targeting of ethnic minorities ===
Attacks on Misseriya Arab civilians in Khartoum occurred by the Sudanese Army at several points in the battle. The Misseriya make up a bulk of the RSF's ethnic base.

The houses of Eritrean and Ethiopian refugees were also targeted.

=== Destruction of heritage ===
Thanasis Pagoulatos, who ran the Acropole Hotel, the oldest hotel in Khartoum and a national and city icon, was forced to flee and close down his hotel on 16 June. Due to the fighting, much of central and downtown Khartoum was destroyed. This included historic and residential areas. Items from the National Museum of Sudan's collection were also looted, with some of them being taken to South Sudan, western Sudan and border areas.

== See also ==
- Siege of El Fasher
- Battle of Aleppo (2012–2016)
- Battle of Aden (2015)
