= Aidan O'Hara =

Irish diplomat (born 1964)

European Union Ambassador to Sudan
- Incumbent
- Assumed office 2022
- Preceded by: Wolfram Vetter

Irish Ambassador to Djibouti
- In office 2016–2020
- Preceded by: Adam Kułach

Irish Ambassador to Ethiopia
- In office 2012–2016
- Succeeded by: Sonja Hyland

Personal details
- Born: 11 June 1964 (age 61) Dublin, Ireland

Aidan O'Hara (born June 11, 1964) is an Irish diplomat currently serving as European Union Ambassador to Sudan. O'Hara was the Irish ambassador to Ethiopia from 2012 to 2016. In 2022, he assumed control as EU Ambassador to Sudan. He presented his credentials on 12 April 2022 to the Chairman of the Transitional Sovereignty Council, Abdel Fattah al-Burhan.

== Biography ==
O'Hara was born on 11 June 1964 in Dublin, Ireland. He graduated with a Bachelor's degree in legal science from Trinity College Dublin and later received a barrister at law degree from Kings Inns.

From 2012 to 2016 he was the Irish ambassador to Ethiopia. During his time as ambassador to Ethiopia, he helped facilitate money for the assistance of Ethiopian migrants returning from Saudi Arabia. He was replaced by Sonja Hyland in this post, who also took on the missions of Djibouti, South Sudan, and the African Union. Following his tenure as ambassador, he served as Director of Policy Planning at the Department of Foreign Affairs and also as Director of the European Division From 2019 to 2022 he was the Ambassador of the European Union to Djibouti and the Intergovernmental Authority on Development. He announced during his term that he wanted to strengthen cooperation projects between the EU and Djibouti like those on child development and equality for women in the country.

Since 2022 he has been the European Union's Ambassador to Sudan. On 17 April 2023, he was reportedly assaulted at his home in Khartoum amid the ongoing civil conflict and battle over the city. He later explained that the group who attacked him were searching for cash and mobile phones. Although he wasn't injured in the initial incident, he was attacked again during his evacuation through a Sudanese airbase, during which a member of his convoy was wounded.
