= Adam Kułach =

Polish diplomat (1965–2022)

2nd Poland Ambassador to Saudi Arabia
- In office 2004–2010
- Preceded by: Krzysztof Płomiński
- Succeeded by: Witold Śmidowski

2nd European Union Ambassador to Saudi Arabia
- In office October 2012 – September 2016
- Preceded by: Luigi Narbone
- Succeeded by: Michele Cervone

European Union Ambassador to Djibouti
- In office October 2016 – 2020
- Preceded by: Joseph Silva
- Succeeded by: Aidan O'Hara

Personal details
- Born: 10 January 1965 Lubliniec, Poland
- Died: 1 September 2022 (aged 57) Katowice, Poland
- Resting place: Northern Communal Cemetery, Warsaw
- Parent(s): Władysław, Józefa
- Education: Moscow State Institute of International Relations
- Profession: Diplomat

Adam Jarosław Kułach (10 January 1965 – 1 September 2022) was a Polish diplomat; ambassador of Poland to Saudi Arabia (2004–2010) and ambassador of the European Union to Saudi Arabia (2012–2016) and Djibouti (2016–2020).

== Life ==
Kułach was born in Lubliniec, and grew up in Sosnowiec. He graduated from political sciences at the Moscow State Institute of International Relations, Faculty of Oriental Studies (1991). He studied also at the Polish Institute of International Affairs (Foreign Service Post-Graduate Studies, 1992), and University of Warsaw (Post-Graduate Studies in Law & Economy of European Communities, 1992; Post-Graduate Management Studies, 2001).

In 1992, he joined the Ministry of Foreign Affairs of Poland. He was junior desk officer for Iraq, Kuwait, and Saudi Arabia at the Department of Africa, Asia, Australia & South Sea Islands. From 1993 to 1999 he was Second and then First Secretary as well as Consul at the Embassy of Poland in Tripoli. For next four years he held the post of desk officer for Iraq, Saudi Arabia, Yemen, reaching the rank of Minister-counselor. In 2000 he became member of the Polish civil service. Between 2004 and 2010 he served as the ambassador of the Republic of Poland to the Kingdom of Saudi Arabia. Since 2005 he was accredited to the Sultanate of Oman, and, since 2009, the Republic of Yemen, as well. He returned to the MFA, being responsible for relations with Arab countries and Iran as deputy director of the Department of Africa and the Middle East; since February 2012 he was director of the Department. In August 2011 he became also Plenipotentiary of the Minister for North Africa. From October 2012 to September 2016 he was in Saudi Arabia, this time as an ambassador of the European Union, accredited also to Bahrain, Kuwait, Oman, Qatar, and since 2016 the Organisation of Islamic Cooperation. In 2016, he ended his term and was nominated EU ambassador to Djibouti and the Intergovernmental Authority on Development. He ended his term in 2020.

In 2013, he received Knight's Cross of the Order of Polonia Restituta for creating Polish policy towards the Middle East after the Arab Spring.

Besides Polish, Kułach was speaking English, Russian, Arabic, and French.

He rested on the Northern Communal Cemetery, Warsaw.
