= Sennar offensive =

Military offensive during the Sudanese civil war (2023–present)

- Part of the Sudanese civil war (2023-present)
| Date | 25 June 2024 – 5 March 2025 (8 months, 4 weeks, 2 days) |
| Location | Sennar State |
| Result | SAF victory |
| Territorial changes | Sudanese army recaptured most of Sennar state except small villages under RSF control, including Mazmoum.; RSF launched incursion into Blue Nile State on 4 August 2024.; SAF launched a counteroffensive on the rest of RSF controlled territory on 5 March 2025, and on the same day recaptured remaining RSF controlled areas located in the state, including Mazmoum and Al-Dali, leading to RSF withdrawal across the South Sudan border. |

Belligerents
| Sudanese government; Sudanese Armed Forces; Al-Bara Battalion; The Middle Call | Rapid Support Forces |

Commanders and leaders
| Ayoub Abdel-Qader; Shams al-Din Kabbashi; Abdelbasit Abdelmonim; Abu Aqla Kikil (from October 2024); Fatah al-Aleem al-Sobhi; Ahmed Awad Bashir † | Abdel Rahman Albishi †; Abu Aqla Kikil |

Units involved
| 17th Infantry Division | Unknown |

Casualties and losses
| Per RSF: 21 vehicles seized 5 vehicles destroyed 150 killed Dozens captured | 15 vehicles destroyed 450 killed 100 surrendered |
- ~ 1,300 civilian missing since RSF assault on Sinja

The paramilitary Rapid Support Forces (RSF) waged a major offensive against the Sudanese Armed Forces (SAF) in Sennar State, resulting in widespread violence and displacement, as part of the ongoing Sudanese civil war.

On 5 March, SAF launched a counteroffensive on the rest of RSF controlled territory in Sennar, and on the same day recaptured remaining RSF controlled areas located in the state, including Mazmoum and Al-Dali, leading to RSF withdrawal across the South Sudan border.

== Background ==
On 15 April 2023, tension between the RSF and SAF escalated into a war. The Rapid Support Forces is led by Mohamed Hamdan Dagalo, commonly referred to as Hemedti, and the Sudanese Armed Forces is led by Abdel Fattah al-Burhan. RSF was able to gain areas across the country. After the RSF's capture of Wad Madani, it was able to make its way to Sennar State. A full offensive on the state was launched on 30 June 2024.

== Offensive ==
The Sennar Offensive began with the RSF attacking the village of Jebal Moya in Sennar province. The conflict soon spread to the provincial capital of Singa, where intense fighting erupted.

RSF fighters in pickup trucks mounted with automatic rifles rampaged through Singa, looting houses and shops, and taking over the city's main hospital. The RSF claimed to have seized the military's main facility, the 17th Infantry Division Headquarters, in Singa.

After the RSF captured the state capital Sinjah, it expanded eastward and captured Dinder. The SAF recaptured the Dinder on 4 July 2024 and claimed that the RSF retreated to Sinja. The statement also claimed to have inflicted heavy losses, destroying 7 vehicles, seizing 9 others, killing 170 soldiers, and captured an unknown SAF commander. A video was also shown of RSF fighters on the Dinder Bridge.

On 5 July 2024, the SAF recaptured the city of El-Suki as well, a city 25 miles east of Sennar.

On 20 July 2024, Lieutant General Abdel Rahman Albishi, a RSF commander leading military operations in Sennar and Blue Nile, was killed in an airstrike in Singa; 400 fighters fighting under his command were also killed. Albishi was originally from Bout, Blue Nile State, and from the Rufa'a tribe.

By 5 October 2024, the SAF recaptured Jebel Moya. The SAF renewed an offensive in Dinder on 19 October 2024. The army reportedly captured and destroyed an unknown number of vehicles and also established checkpoints in surrounding villages. By 23 October 2024, the SAF recaptured Dinder after a few days of battling for the town.

On 20 October 2024, The SAF announced the defection of Abu Aqla Kakil, the RSF's commander in Gezira State.

By 23 October, The Sudanese army seizes Al-Dinder from Rapid Support Forces. Since then, The Sudanese army kept pushing towards Singa the capital of Sennar State. Liberating villages from the brutal RSF control and torture warfare used all against International Law.

On 7 November 2024, the SAF arrested dozens of suspected RSF collaborators and recruits in villages west of Dinder.

In 22 November, The SAF were in the doorsteps of Singa. Heavy fighting can be heard in the outskirts of the city with multiple wounded being reported.

On 23 November, The SAF stormed the city and took main control of the main market, hospitals, and the 17th infantry division headquarters. Heavy celebrations flooded the streets of Singa with many refugees who were prior displaced by the RSF are returning to their homes.

By February 2025, the state has not been a sight of much conflict due to the main places of battle in Gezira, Khartoum State, North Kordofan, and Darfur. However an RSF unit with 100 fighters surrendered to the army on 15 February.

On 5 March, SAF launched a counteroffensive on the rest of RSF controlled territory in Sennar, and on the same day recaptured remaining RSF controlled areas located in the state, including Mazmoum and Al-Dali, leading to RSF withdrawal across the South Sudan border.

== Impact ==
The violence forced about 57,000 people to flee their homes. Those fleeing Singa arrived in Gedaref, Blue Nile, White Nile, and Kassala states. Aid groups in Gedaref, which is already hosting more than 600,000 people, started planning for the arrival of those fleeing Sennar.

The Sennar Offensive has had severe humanitarian consequences, with potential future disruption of large-scale agricultural programs in the nearby provinces of Blue Nile, White Nile, and Jazira.
