= Abu Aqla Kaikal =

Sudanese military officer

Major General Abu Aqla Kaikal
- أبو عاقلة كيكل

Personal details
- Born: 1971 or 1972 (age 54–55)

Military service
- Allegiance: Rapid Support Forces (until October 2024); Sudanese Armed Forces (from October 2024)
- Rank: Major General
- Commands: RSF in Gezira State and Butana (until October 2024); SAF in Gezira and Khartoum State (from October 2024)
- Battles/wars: Sudanese civil war (2023-present); First Battle of Wad Madani; Sennar offensive; Battle of Jebel Moya; Second Battle of Wad Madani; Battle of Khartoum (2023–2025); 2024–2025 Bahri offensive; 2026 Blue Nile campaign; Battle of Barah

Abu Aqla Kaikal (Arabic: أبو عاقلة كيكل, romanized: Abū ʻĀqilah kykl, born c. 1971-1972) (also spelled Abu Agla Keikel, also Keikal), is a Sudanese military officer and former commander in the Rapid Support Forces (RSF).

== Early life ==
Kaikal originates from Butana in Central Sudan. He is a retired officer from the Sudanese Armed Forces (SAF), and founded the Sudan Shield Forces in 2022. Keikel became an activist and a key member of the executive office for the "Free Butana Forum," which focuses on Butana region affairs.

== Sudanese civil war ==
After the Sudanese civil war started Kaikal first sided with the SAF but in August of 2023, he declared his support for the RSF. In October 2024, he defected back to the SAF, which triggered a series of violent retaliatory attacks by the RSF on civilians in the Gezira State. These attacks have resulted in numerous casualties and widespread displacement.

In February 2025, Human Rights Watch reported that Sudan Shield Forces, led by Abu Aqla Kaikal, targeted civilians in Taiba, Gezira State, killing at least 26 people. The HRW verified the attack using satellite imagery and videos, labeling it as a potential war crime. SAF condemned the incident as an "individual transgression", but has since not launched a full investigation.

On 2 May 2026, a suspected RSF drone strike on his residence in Al-Kahli Zaidan, Gezira State, killed his brother and five other relatives.

== Sanctions ==
On 18 July 2025, Kaikal was sanctioned by the European Union, which determined that he is "responsible for actions and policies that threaten the peace, stability and security of Sudan. In addition, he is responsible for directing acts in Sudan that constitute serious human rights violations, and for obstructing the delivery of, access to and distribution of humanitarian assistance in Sudan." On 5 February 2026, Kaikal was also sanctioned by the United Kingdom over his role in the current conflict.
