= Sinja, Sudan =

Place in Sennar, Sudan

Sinja سنجة
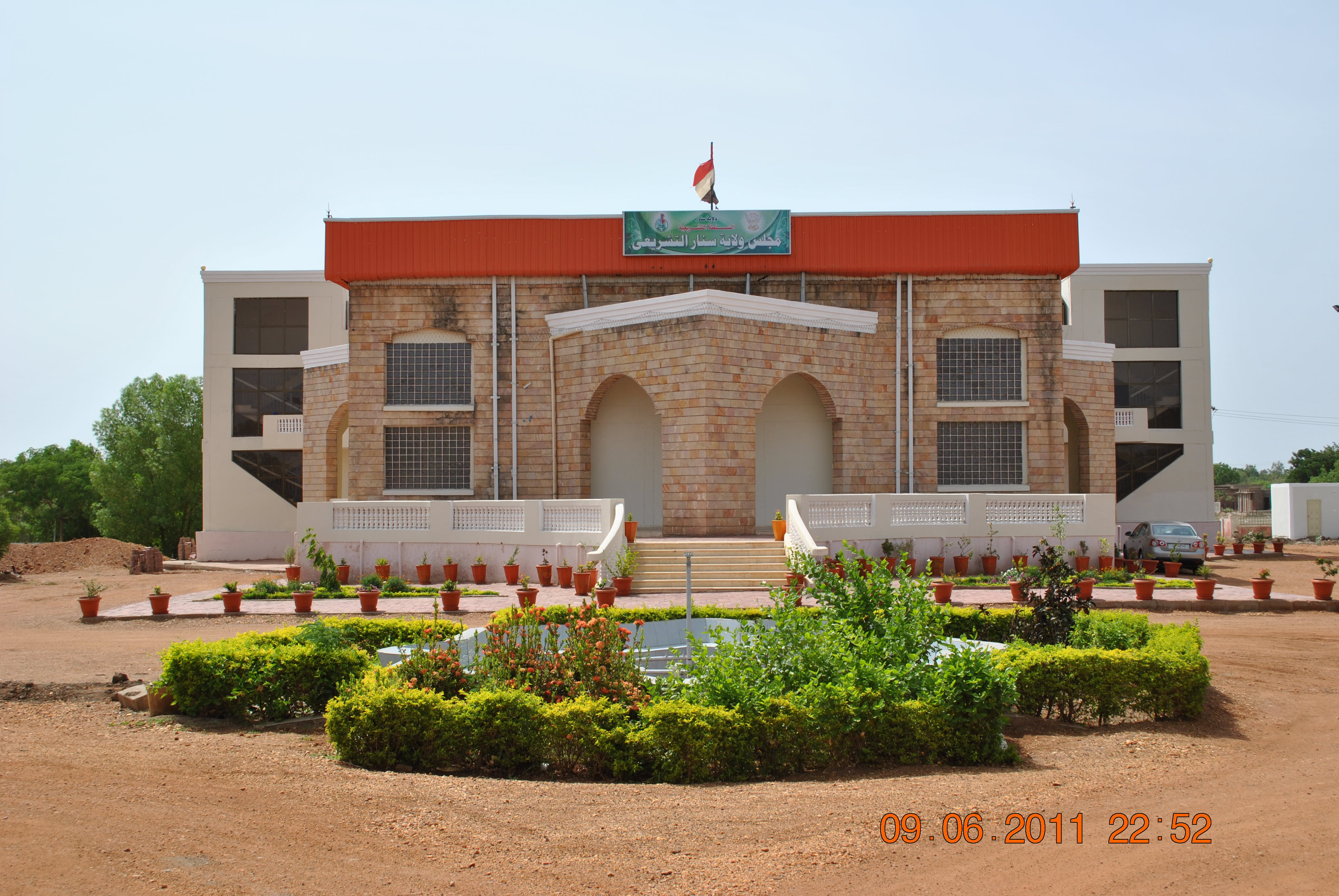
- Nickname: Sinja Abdullah (Arabic سنجة عبدالله)
- Location within Sudan
- Coordinates: 13°09′N 33°56′E
- States of Sudan: Sennar (state)

Government
  - Type: Administrative Unit

Area
  - Urban: 290 sq mi (750 km^{2})
- Elevation: 1,440 ft (439 m)

Population (2025)
  - City: 250,000

Sinja (Arabic: سنجة) is a town located in the Sennar State of Sudan at an elevation of 439 meters (1,440 feet) above sea level. The town is situated on the west bank of the Blue Nile at a distance of 360 kilometers (220 miles) to the southeast of the capital, Khartoum, and 60 kilometers from the city of Sennar. Its population was recorded to be 259,000 in 2002.

Sinja is the capital of Sennar State and is characterized by the diversity of its natural environment, habitat, water resources, and livestock. It remains publicly unclear whether Sinja or Sennar is the state capital. A large veterinary research station has been founded in the city. Its economic activities vary from agriculture to pastoralism. Important crops are sorghum, gum arabic, and fruits such as guava, banana and mango.

On 29 June 2024, the city was captured by the RSF during the Sudanese civil war. In November 2024 the Sudanese Armed Forces retook the city.

== Archaeological discovery ==
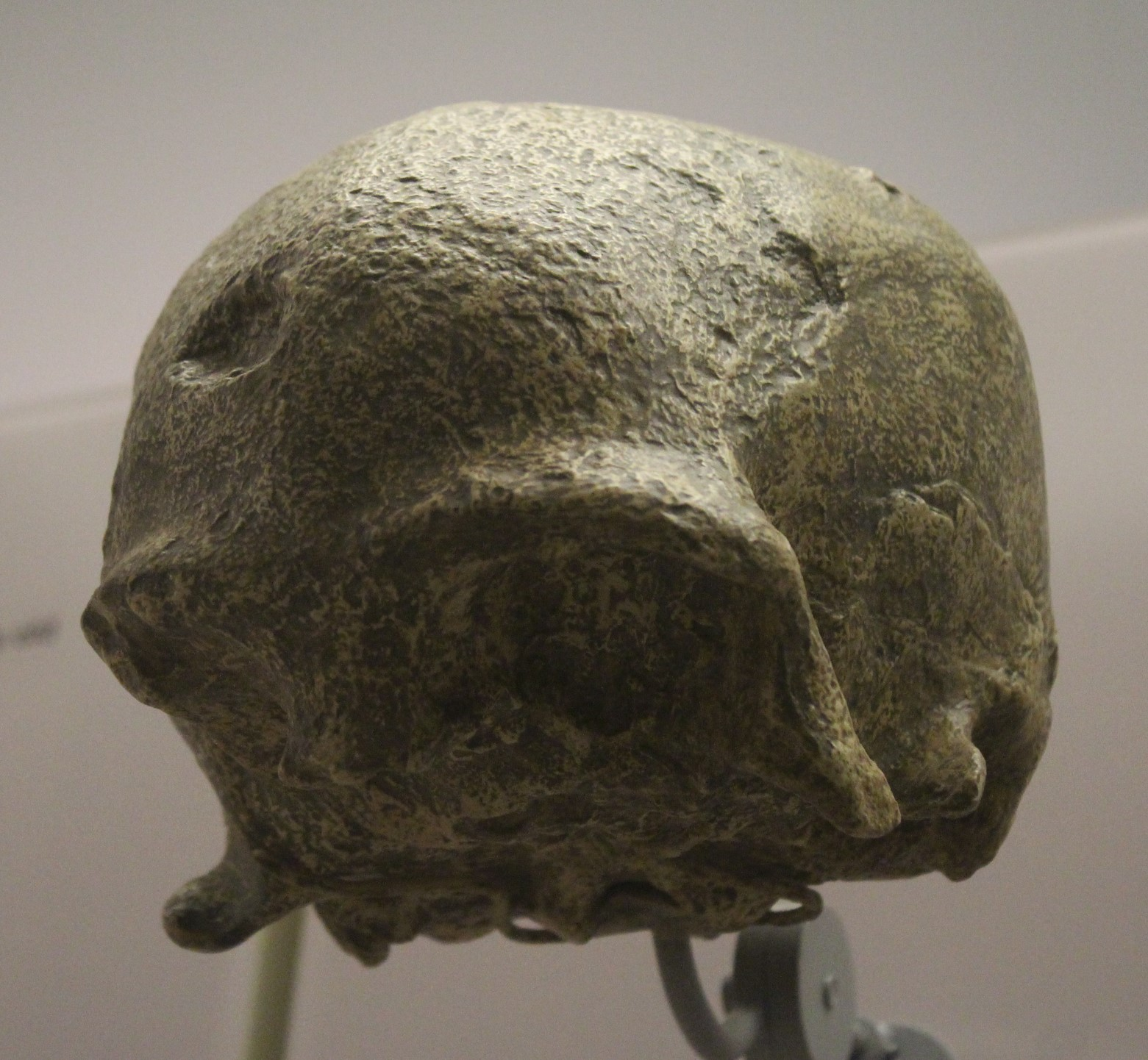
Replica of the Sinja Skull, National Museum of Natural History

Sinja is notable for the archaeological discovery of an old human fossil, the 'Sinja Skull' which was discovered in Sinja in 1924 by the British governor of Blue Nile Province. The skull is about 160,000 years old and belongs to the Stone Age, Pleistocene Age. It coincided with the Neanderthals and the Peking Man. Currently the skull is in the collection of the Natural History Museum, London.

== Connections ==
Sinja is served by several bank branches, a hospital, and a hotel. There is no airport in the town; the nearest airport is Kosti airport, at a distance of 129 kilometers (80 miles). A network of track roads and railways connects the city with its major neighboring towns and cities.

In 2011, the Library of Congress still presented maps indicating that Sennar was the capital of Sennar State, but more recent works indicate that the capital is at Sinja.
