= Shams al-Din Kabbashi =

Sudanese army officer (born 1961)

Lieutenant General Shams al-Din Kabbashi
- شمس الدين كباشي
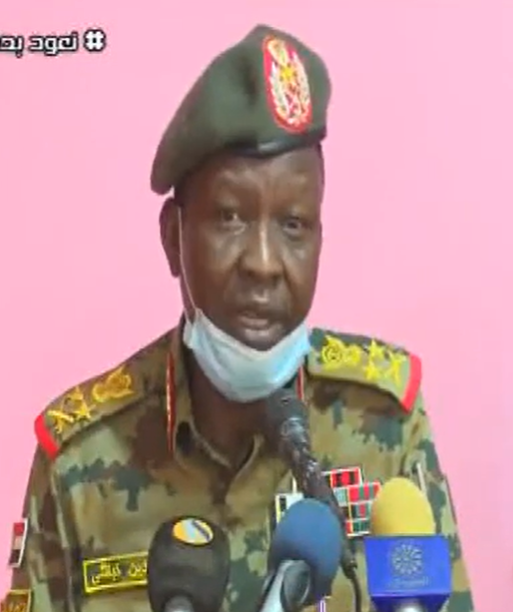
- An image of Shams al-Din Kabbashi during an interview broadcast by Ashorooq TV in 2020

Member of the Transitional Sovereignty Council
- Incumbent
- Assumed office 20 August 2019
- Prime Minister: Abdalla Hamdok; Osman Hussein (acting); Dafallah al-Haj Ali (acting); Kamil Idris
- Chairman: Abdel Fattah al-Burhan

Member of the Transitional Military Council
- In office 11 April 2019 – 20 August 2019
- Prime Minister: Abdalla Hamdok
- Chairman: Abdel Fattah al-Burhan

Personal details
- Born: Shams al-Din Kabbashi Ibrahim Shinto; 1 January 1961 (age 65) Dalang, Kordofan Province, Republic of Sudan
- Parent: Kabbashi Ibrahim Shinto (father)

Military service
- Allegiance: Sudanese Armed Forces
- Rank: Lieutenant General
- Battles/wars: Second Sudanese Civil War; War in Darfur; Sudanese civil war (2023–present); Battle of Khartoum (2023–2025); Sennar offensive; Kordofan Campaign (2023–present)

Lieutenant General Shams al-Din Kabbashi (Arabic: شمس الدين كباشي, romanized: Shams al-Dīn Kabāshī; born 1 January 1961), is a Sudanese military officer and academic. He holds the distinction of being the fifth military member of the Sudanese Sovereign Council, a significant political body formed following the ousting of President Omar al-Bashir in 2019. He is Deputy Commander-in-Chief of the Sudanese Armed Forces.

== Early life and education ==
Shams al-Din Kabbashi Ibrahim Shinto was raised in the village of Anqarko, located south of Dalang, in South Kordofan. He was born into the Ghulfan Hill Nubian clan. His father, Kabashi Ibrahim Shinto, served as a soldier in the Sudan Defence Force with the Haggana Brigade, from 1955 to 1973.

Kabbashi education journey took him through various schools due to his father's military postings, including primary schools in Dalang, Babanusa, al-Mandal, al-Hammadi, Talodi, and middle school at Habila and Heiban schools in South Kordofan. He completed his high school education at Talwi Secondary School in Kadugli.

== Career ==
=== Military career ===
Shams al-Din Kabbashi's military career began when he joined the Sudanese Military College in February 1981, eventually graduating in February 1983 with the rank of lieutenant. Over the years, he climbed the ranks, achieving the position of first lieutenant general in February 2020. Throughout his military career, he held various academic and leadership roles within the military, including teaching at the 5th Infantry Division, serving as an instructor at the Command and Staff College, and commanding divisions and departments.

=== Political involvement ===
Kabbashi became politically involved after the resignation of Ahmed Awad bin Auf from the presidency of the Military Council following the revolution that ousted President Omar al-Bashir. He was appointed as the spokesman for the Transitional Military Council and later became a member of the Sudanese Sovereign Council on 20 August 2019. He also participated in government negotiations during peace talks between the Sudanese government and armed movements in Juba, South Sudan, in 2020.

In November 2021, a new transitional sovereignty council was formed, with Shams al-Din Kabbashi continuing to serve as a member.
