= Battle of Wad Madani =

Battle during the War in Sudan

- Part of Sudanese civil war (2023–present)
| Date | First Battle:15–19 December 2023 (4 days); Second Battle: 11 January 2025 |
| Location | Wad Madani, Gezira State |
| Result | First Battle: RSF victory Second Battle: SAF victory |
| Territorial changes | First Battle: RSF seizes control of Wad Madani between December 2023 and January 2025; Second Battle: SAF regained control of Wad Madani: SAF continues moving north towards Khartoum |

Combatants
| Sudanese government; Sudanese Armed Forces | Rapid Support Forces |

Commanders and leaders
| First battle Ahmad al-Tayeb (surrendered); Mahmoud Al-Numan (surrendered); Second battle Abu Aqla Kikal (defected) | First battle Abu Agla Kikal |

Units involved
| 1st Infantry Division | Unknown |

Casualties and losses
- 250,000 – 300,000 displaced

The Battle of Wad Madani was a battle in the Sudanese civil war over the control of Wad Madani, the capital of Gezira State in east-central Sudan, between the Sudanese Armed Forces (SAF) and the Rapid Support Forces (RSF). The initial battle ended with the RSF capturing the town on 19 December 2023. The Sudanese Armed Forces retook control of the town on 11 January 2025.

== Background ==
Gezira and White Nile states were historically considered SAF strongholds. In Gezira State alone, over 40,000 people were mobilized into the SAF. De facto leader of Sudan Abdel Fattah al-Burhan regularly made visits to southern cities that served as training hubs for new SAF recruits, including Wad Madani. Gezira is Sudan's most fertile state, producing much of the country's agricultural products, including half of its total wheat, making the state a major food source for the country. As such, the state is referred to as Sudan's "breadbasket".

For most of the war, the battle for Khartoum was in stalemate. However, on 11 November, the Shambat Bridge over the Nile was destroyed, denying the RSF a critical supply route to the western side of the river. In need of a new crossing, the RSF assaulted the village of Jabal Awliya on the border with the southern states to capture the Jebel Aulia Dam. A week of fighting later, the RSF captured both. Jabal Awliya's seizure gave the RSF access to the south. Afterward, the RSF had been sighted in the states of Gezira, White Nile and later Al Qadarif for the first time. On 14 December, the RSF carried out a raid on northern Gezira, capturing the town of Abu Guta without resistance, thereby gaining a foothold in the state.

== December 2023 RSF attack ==
The battle began on 15 December with a flanking maneuver by the RSF that bypassed the northern city of Rufaa and threatened to cut off the SAF, forcing the latter to retreat to Wad Madani itself. The RSF then swiftly entered the city's suburbs of Abu Haraz and Hantoob on the eastern side of the Blue Nile.

Most of the fighting took place in Hantoob as the RSF focused on capturing the strategic Hantoob Bridge over the Blue Nile. The SAF claimed that the first RSF assault on the city was repelled with heavy artillery and air strikes, prompting civilians to celebrate on the streets. However, it was later known that these attacks failed to stem the RSF advance. Fears of RSF "sleeper cells" spread throughout the city and people began to be arrested mainly on ethnic basis. After three days of fighting, the RSF captured a military base that guarded the eastern side of the bridge.

Taking the bridge, the RSF invaded the city proper and quickly advanced to its main market. SAF defenses promptly collapsed as RSF control soon extended to major government buildings in the city, including the 1st Infantry Division's headquarters and the central police station. The SAF abandoned their positions and fled to neighboring states, leaving the rest of the city to be taken mostly without a fight. However, isolated SAF pockets continued to resist around the 1st Infantry Division headquarters until they were quelled while airstrikes by the SAF persisted.

=== Aftermath ===
The loss of Wad Madani was described as a "major turn" in the war by Al Jazeera. It astonished Sudan and a feeling of anger swept Sudanese circles. Some residents said they were losing faith that the SAF would protect them and stop the RSF. The SAF's collapse allowed the RSF to subsequently conquer most of the state, push into White Nile, and reach Sennar State further south.

The military faced criticism for its conduct in the city afterward. An expert warned that the loss of the city would dampen public opinion on Burhan and his government. Calls grew for Burhan to step down and for the military to change its strategy. Calls also grew for a coup d'etat to remove the current military leadership. Analysts, however, warned such a move would likely fragment the SAF. The SAF said it would conduct an investigation into why the military retreated from the city. Burhan blamed "negligence" for the city's fall and pledged that those responsible would be held accountable.

On 7 January, the SAF conducted airstrikes on Wad Madani killing at least 11 civilians.

After a month of the fall of Wad Madani, Malik Agar ordered the 4th Infantry Division in Blue Nile to move north toward Wad Madani.

=== Analysis ===
The capture of Wad Madani gave the RSF free movement throughout Gezira State and access to other major cities in the fertile Butana region, including El-Gadarif, Kosti, and Sennar, making it difficult for the SAF to concentrate its forces.

Hussein Rabah, a Sudanese military expert, described Wad Madani as the "lungs of Sudan", an important crossroads for the country. He said its capture effectively cut off the regions of Darfur and Kordofan, and the states of Khartoum and White Nile from the army. Cameron Hudson, a former United States official and expert on the Horn of Africa, believed that Burhan would likely turn to Eritrea or Iran in the hopes of changing the tide back in the SAF's favor.

In 2024, Abu Aqla Kikal, a former RSF commander in Gezira State who defected to the SAF, accused SAF Lieutenant Colonel Mahmoud Al-Numan of withdrawing his forces from the Halfaya Bridge, enabling the RSF to enter Wad Madani. Sources within the SAF also accused Numan, who has since defected to the RSF of withdrawing his forces from their positions during the battle without authorisation.

== April 2024 – January 2025 SAF offensive and victory ==
On 4 April, the SAF launched an offensive to reclaim Gezira State. Sudan Tribune stated that the SAF retook the villages of Wad Faqisha and Hafira in Gezira State from the RSF without resistance. The SAF has also claimed to have retaken the town of Al-Qalaa Al-Bayda, 30 kilometers east of Wad Madani, from the RSF.

SAF retook control of Wad Madani on 11 January 2025.

== Displacement ==
Throughout Sudan, as of December 2023, millions of people had been internally displaced from war. Before the battle started, Wad Madani was the most common area for displaced civilians to go and was generally considered a safe haven. Before the RSF offensive on Gezira, it was believed that the state hosted 500,000 displaced people, which mostly came from the Battle in Khartoum. The United States urged the RSF to halt their advance in Gezira State and the attack on Wad Madani, saying it would put civilians at risk and hamper relief efforts. By 18 December the International Organization for Migration estimated that between 250,000 and 300,000 people had fled the state since the start of hostilities, leaving for the neighbouring states of Al Qadarif, White Nile, and Sennar. Most aid groups had suspended work in the city after fighting began.

== See also ==
- El Fasher massacre
- Gezira State canal killings
