= Timeline of the Sudanese civil war (2023) =

The following is a timeline of the Sudanese civil war (2023–present) in 2023.

This timeline is a dynamic and fluid list, and as such may never satisfy criteria of completeness. Moreover, some events may only be fully understood and/or discovered in retrospect.

== April 2023 ==
=== 15 April ===
==== Khartoum ====
The Rapid Support Forces (RSF) launched attacks on multiple Sudanese Armed Forces (SAF) bases across the country, including in the capital Khartoum. At 12:00 (CAT), RSF forces claimed to have captured Khartoum International Airport, Merowe Airport, El Obeid Airport as well as a base in Soba. Clashes between the RSF and the SAF erupted at the Presidential Palace and at the residence of de facto leader and SAF commander General Abdel Fattah al-Burhan, with both sides claiming control over the two sites.

In response, the SAF announced the closure of all airports in the country. and the Sudanese Air Force conducted airstrikes on RSF positions in Khartoum with artillery fire being heard in parts of the city.

Elsewhere in Khartoum clashes were reported at the headquarters of the state broadcaster Sudan TV. The channel halted a news bulletin after the presenter began reading an item about the situation in Khartoum with gunshots being heard in the background and switched the programming to music. Eyewitnesses and Al Arabiya later reported that the TV station was captured by RSF forces. Bridges and roads in Khartoum were closed and checkpoints set up. The RSF claimed that all roads heading south of Khartoum have been closed.

At Khartoum International Airport, multiple aircraft belonging to Saudia, Badr Airlines, and SkyUp Airlines among others were reported to be damaged according to Flightradar24. Saudia later confirmed that one of its aircraft, an Airbus, came under fire before take-off at the airport and that it had evacuated all passengers, crew and staff to the Saudi embassy. It, along with EgyptAir and Qatar Airways also suspended all flights to and from Sudan.

In an interview with Al Jazeera, Hemedti accused Abdel Fattah al-Burhan of forcing the RSF to begin confrontations and accused SAF commanders of scheming to bring deposed leader Omar al-Bashir back to power. On Twitter, Hemedti called for the international community to intervene against Burhan, claiming that the RSF was fighting against radical militants.

==== Darfur ====
Clashes erupted in the capital of North Darfur state, Al-Fashir, while Nyala Airport in South Darfur was shelled. In Al-Fashir, clashes were ongoing using light and heavy weapons with RSF forces trying to capture the airport and other buildings. RSF forces claimed to have captured the airport, and the Signal Corps and Medical Corps headquarters in Al-Fashir. Clashes erupted in Zalingei in Central Darfur.

==== Elsewhere ====
Later in the day, the SAF claimed that RSF forces in White Nile, Gedaref, Kassala, Nyala, Port Sudan, Kadugli, Damazin and Kosti had surrendered and that the RSF camps of Taiba and Soba had been destroyed.

=== 16 April ===
==== SAF ====
The Khartoum State Security Committee declared a public holiday in the city "in order to preserve lives of citizens and their property". At around 13:30 (CAT), the SAF announced the rescue of a major general and a brigadier, the arrests of multiple RSF officers at Merowe Airport and the taking of the airport itself, while also claiming that multiple RSF leaders had deserted or surrendered to SAF. SAF officials also claimed that RSF members had fled Merowe Airport with Egyptian soldiers being taken as prisoners.

The Sudan Civil Aviation Authority announced the closure of the country's airspace as well as that of parts of South Sudan that it also manages due to 'security reasons.' Telecommunications provider MTN shut down internet services across the country after orders from the Sudanese telecommunications regulator were given. Sudan TV also completely halted its broadcasts, and a local news website reported that clashes had taken place within the headquarters of the station and that its control room "was bombed". Reuters cited staff as saying that the authorities had cut transmissions to prevent broadcasting by RSF forces. Attacks were also reported at facilities of Sudan Railways.

The Chadian Army stopped and disarmed a contingent of 320 Sudanese soldiers who had entered the country from Darfur while fleeing the RSF.

==== RSF ====
An RSF advisor said that they tactically withdrew from the Karari camp in Omdurman while also claiming that 90% of Khartoum was under RSF control. Sources from Al Jazeera indicated that at around 18:00 (CAT), RSF forces took control over the Blue Nile TV network. In Nyala, the RSF claimed control of the SAF's 16th Infantry Division at around 18:30 (CAT), according to residents RSF forces captured the city's airport after capturing a military base in the previous day.

The RSF claimed on Twitter that they had taken control of the SAF's 21st Brigade at Kabkabiya in Darfur.

==== International ====
- The Arab League, European Union and United Nations express concern over the conflict, encouraging the warring sides to agree to a ceasefire.
- Egypt and South Sudan offer to mediate an agreement between the warring sides.
- Chad, Egypt and South Sudan close their borders to Sudan.

=== 17 April ===
Clashes resumed in Khartoum with artillery being heard from the northern and southern parts of the capital as fighting went on in front of the gates of the army headquarters. Fighting was ongoing in Omdurman, with use of fighter jets by the military and anti-aircraft missiles by the RSF. Fighting took place west of Merowe airport.

A US diplomatic convoy was fired upon in Darfur and managed to escape unharmed. Preliminary reports linked the assailants to the RSF.

==== SAF ====
Avatar of محمد حمدان دقلو

محمد حمدان دقلو
(@GenerallDagllo)
tweeted:

We are fighting against radical Islamists who hope to keep Sudan isolated and in the dark, and far removed from democracy. We will continue to pursue Al-Burhan and bring him to justice.

17 April 2023

The SAF claimed control of the headquarters of Sudan TV and state radio in Khartoum, and Sudan TV resumed its broadcasting with pro-army songs and anthems. The RSF released a video on their Twitter page, purportedly filmed in front of Sudan TV compound's gates, and disputed its control.

==== RSF ====
At 10:00 (CAT), the RSF claimed to be in full control of Merowe Airport.

=== 18 April ===
As a ceasefire was announced to begin later in the day, fighting continued in Khartoum with fighter jets flying across the capital, launching attacks against what appeared to be RSF targets. The RSF used anti-aircraft defense systems and heavy artillery to repel the attacks. Reporters said that armed personnel had entered several hospitals in Khartoum. Medical facilities have also reported a shortage of medical personnel, electricity and water. Al Jazeera reported that confrontations appear to have stopped in south Khartoum, and fighting was ongoing in the center of the capital near the presidential palace and the army headquarters. The RSF was reported to have looted some residential areas of the capital, with residents of the Khartoum 2 area telling the BBC that the RSF had been going house-to-house demanding water and food. After the ceasefire came into effect at 18:00 local time, gunfire and shelling continued to be heard in Khartoum. Two rockets struck the Yunus Emre Institute in Khartoum, without causing any casualties.

At Merowe, eyewitnesses reported seeing an RSF column heading away from the perimeter of its airport to al-Multaqa, 100 km (62 miles) to the south, following air strikes by the military the previous day.

=== 19 April ===
Battles continued in Khartoum near the army headquarters, the presidential palace, and the airport, with heavy weaponry being used. The SAF said that it was attacked by the RSF at its general command headquarters but had repelled the attack, inflicting "heavy losses" on the RSF, who were reported to have abandoned 24 land cruisers, and calling on them to surrender, promising pardons to members who would do so. It also admitted that the RSF managed to seize a number of government buildings such as the Ministry of the Council of Ministers, the Ministry of the Interior and the Civil Registry Department. Observers determined that the SAF was controlling access to Khartoum and trying to cut off supply routes to RSF fighters. Witnesses said the SAF reinforcements were brought in from near the eastern border with Ethiopia.

The SAF accused the RSF of assaulting civilians in Khartoum and other parts of the country, carrying out acts of looting and burning at a market in Khartoum Bahri and going on a rampage, looting and assaulting people in Merowe.

As another ceasefire was announced to begin at 18:00 local time, fighting was reported to have mostly subsided around Khartoum Airport but continued to be intense around the Presidential Palace, Army Headquarters and in the Jabra neighborhood of west Khartoum, where homes belonging to Hemedti and his family were located. Fighting was reported to have continued several minutes into the start of the ceasefire. Hemedti was reportedly seen commanding operations from the Hai al-Matar neighborhood, close to the military headquarters. The RSF accused the SAF of using heavy artillery against homes in Jabra, breaching international law. A huge fire broke out in the Khartoum 2 area after an attack at a weapons store.

In Merowe, an Al Jazeera correspondent said that the SAF had regained full control over the airport, which had been totally destroyed in the fighting, and that the situation was returning to normal although the presence of military vehicles was still noted. The RSF claimed that it still maintained a presence in the city.

The SAF seized control of the RSF's Chevrelet military base on the Libyan border to prevent the flow of weapons to the RSF from that country.

Diplomatic missions in Sudan, which included those of Australia, Canada, Japan, Norway, South Korea, Switzerland, the United Kingdom, the United States, and the European Union (France, Germany, Italy, the Netherlands, Poland, Spain, and Sweden), issued a joint statement calling for fighting parties to observe their obligations under international law, specifically urging them to "protect civilians, diplomats and humanitarian actors," avoid further escalations and initiate talks to "resolve outstanding issues".

=== 20 April ===
The RSF said that it repelled a SAF attack on its positions in Omdurman in the morning despite the ongoing ceasefire, shooting down two helicopters in the process. RSF forces approaching Khartoum were blocked by SAF air and land forces. Al Jazeera reported that clashes continued near the army headquarters and the presidential palace. Explosions were also reported in El-Obeid, the capital of North Kordofan state.

=== 21 April ===
The day marked Eid al-Fitr with calls for a ceasefire to allow for celebrations. Despite Burhan calling for unity and Hemedti saying it would abide by a ceasefire, to which the SAF later agreed, fighting continued for the seventh day. Heavy shelling and gunfire was reported in Khartoum, Khartoum Bahri and Omdurman as the RSF accused the SAF of staging a "sweeping attack". The SAF replied that it was "combing" the streets of Khartoum for the RSF, using soldiers on foot. Fighting was described as particularly intense along the highway going to Port Sudan and in the industrial zone of al-Bagair. Fighting was also recorded in El-Obeid. Al-Arabiya TV reported that the SAF had established full control over Merowe.

=== 22 April ===
Heavy fighting continued in Khartoum, particularly around the Presidential Palace and the airport. Fighting also spread along the main road leading south-east out of the capital.

=== 23 April ===
A near-total Internet outage was reported across Sudan, with cybersecurity watchdog organization NetBlocks saying that Internet connectivity was at only 2 percent of usual levels. It suggested electricity shortages caused by attacks on the electric grid was the cause.

The RSF claimed that they captured a military manufacturing facility in the neighborhood of Masoudiya in southeast Khartoum as well as another facility in Khartoum Bahri. It also said one of its convoys assisting the evacuation of French nationals was attacked in Omdurman by a military jet, which it claimed to have shot down. The SAF said the RSF tried to seize the El Jeili refinery north of Khartoum.

==== Kobar jailbreak ====
A mass jailbreak was reported at the Kobar Prison in Khartoum after it was broken into by armed men. A military official said it repelled an RSF attack on the prison saying a few other prisoners were killed or injured while high-profile inmates such as former President Omar al-Bashir were safely secured inside. However, the SAF later said that Bashir had been transferred to the Aliyaa military hospital prior to the fighting. The interior ministry said that the jailbreak at Kobar was part of a series of attacks on five prisons by the RSF from 21 to 24 April. It said that the RSF raid on Kobar led to the deaths of two prison officials and the release of all detainees. The total number of escapees from the attacks was estimated to be at about 25,000.

Former interior minister Ahmad Harun, who is wanted by the International Criminal Court for war crimes in Darfur and was imprisoned after Bashir's ouster in 2019, said that he and other former officials of the Bashir regime had escaped during the attack with the help of prison guards and the armed forces. He also voiced his support for the SAF in the war. The SAF denied any involvement, saying it did not have jurisdiction over the prison system.

=== 24 April ===
The SAF accused the RSF of sabotaging the telecom exchange in Khartoum, leading to a nationwide loss of internet service and reduced connectivity in Chad, whose internet infrastructure is interconnected with Sudan. It is suspected that the RSF attacked telecommunications infrastructure to prevent the SAF from broadcasting programs of Sudan TV over the Internet. Al-Arabiya reported that clashes had commenced in Geneina. Seven people were reportedly killed in an air strike on a residential area in the Kalakla neighborhood of south Khartoum. A 72-hour ceasefire was agreed between both sides that was set to start from midnight. The RSF said that the aim of the ceasefire was to "establish humanitarian corridors, allowing citizens and residents to access essential resources, healthcare, and safe zones, while also evacuating diplomatic missions".

Israel offers to mediate between the SAF and the RSF.

=== 25 April ===
Despite the ceasefire, heavy artillery fire was reported in Omdurman, where a dozen people were injured after a hospital was hit, while fighting continued in Khartoum and in Geneina, West Darfur, according to local sources. The RSF was reported to have taken the town of Wad Banda in West Kordofan state. Gunfire was reported at Port Sudan Prison as the SAF accused the RSF of attacking jails. Internet access was partially restored in Khartoum after the state provider Sudatel was reconnected following attacks on its facilities.

The World Health Organization expressed alarm over potential biological hazards after one of the warring sides, whom it did not identify, seized control of the National Public Health Laboratory containing measles, polio and cholera pathogens, among other hazardous substances, and expelled the facility's technicians.

Container shipping company AP Moller-Maersk announced it would stop taking new bookings of goods for Sudan.

=== 26 April ===
The RSF posted a video in which it claimed to be in control of the Garri oil refinery and power plant more than 70 kilometres (43 miles) north of Khartoum as fighting continued around the capital and more clashes were reported in West Kordofan and in West Darfur. A mob stormed the state headquarters of police in Geneina, West Darfur and seized weapons amid fears of intercommunal fighting. Intercommunal clashes were reported in Blue Nile State.

=== 27 April ===
Despite the ongoing ceasefire, the SAF launched air strikes on RSF positions around the Presidential Palace and in Khartoum Bahri. Fighting also continued in Geneina. The RSF accused the SAF of attacking its base in the Kafuri area of Khartoum Bahri. Despite this, the ceasefire was later extended for an additional 72 hours.

Observers reported that the RSF was committing abuses against the civilian population in Darfur, particularly in Nyala and Geneina, such as arson, theft, looting, destruction of property and killing. RSF soldiers were filmed outside Geneina's police headquarters., while the Deputy Police Director of West Darfur, Brigadier General Abdel-Baqi Al-Hassan Mohamed, was reportedly shot and killed.

=== 28 April ===
Despite the extension of the ceasefire, fighting continued in Khartoum, Khartoum Bahri and Omdurman.

A Turkish evacuation plane was fired upon at Wadi Seidna Air Base and required repair after it sustained damage to its fuel system. There were no casualties reported. The SAF blamed the RSF for the attack, which it denied. The RSF also claimed the capture of the SAF-controlled Hattab Operational Base in Khartoum, as well as 3 tanks and 9 cars within the base. Intercommunal violence between Arabs and Masalit communities was reported in West Darfur.

=== 29 April ===
Heavy fighting continued in Khartoum and other warzones as Hemedti said insisted he would not negotiate with the SAF until the fighting stops and reiterated his accusations against the SAF donning RSF uniforms to blame them for atrocities committed during the war. Meanwhile, trenches were reported to have been set up in Khartoum by both sides as street-by-street fighting continued.

=== 30 April ===
The SAF announced it was launching an all-out attack to flush out the RSF in Khartoum using air strikes and heavy artillery. Drone strikes were reported at RSF positions near a major oil refinery, while video emerged showing a building of the Central Bank of Sudan on fire following heavy fighting. The Sudanese police announced it had deployed its Central Reserve Forces in the streets of Khartoum to maintain law and order. The unit, which had been sanctioned by the US government for its role in suppressing pro-democracy protests after the 2021 coup, had been warned by the RSF not to intervene in the war. The unit later said that it had arrested 316 "rebels", referring to the RSF.

Local authorities in Khartoum placed civil servants on open-ended leave.

== May 2023 ==
=== 1 May ===
The SAF said it had reduced the RSF's combat capabilities to 55% and thwarted several RSF advances around the country, including offensives from the western regions, along the northwestern border and a third heading from el-Baghir to Jabal Awliya. Air strikes were reported in Omdurman, while fighting continued around the Presidential Palace and in Khartoum Bahri. Clashes were reported to have spread to the neighborhood of al-Jerif.

=== 2 May ===
The RSF claimed to have shot down a MiG fighter jet during air strikes by the SAF over Khartoum.

=== 3 May ===
Fighting continued in Khartoum, Omdurman and Khartoum Bahri. The UN's head of emergency relief Martin Griffiths arrived in Port Sudan to inspect aid operations.

=== 4 May ===
Clashes continued in Khartoum, with shelling being reported in Omdurman. The Sudanese government reported that almost 5,000 people have been injured since the war began on 15 April. UN relief head Martin Griffiths said that the "will to end the fight still was not there" after he spoke with the leaders of the RSF and SAF. Protesters surrounded the residence of UN Special Envoy Volker Perthes in Port Sudan and demanded his departure. He had previously been a target of protests by pro-military and Islamist groups.

=== 6 May ===
The Turkish government announced that its embassy in Khartoum would be moved to Port Sudan, after the Turkish ambassador's car was struck by gunfire. Both sides of the war blamed the other for responsibility in the attack.

=== 8 May ===
Fighting took place in Khartoum Bahri around an army base in the Shambat neighborhood and a bridge controlled by the RSF in the Halfiya neighborhood. The SAF also detained two prodemocracy activists in the city, accusing them of supporting the RSF. The two, who were volunteer medical workers, were arrested for allegedly driving a stolen ambulance but were later released.

=== 9 May ===
The RSF accused the SAF of carrying out an air strike that destroyed the Old Republican Palace, which the latter denied.

=== 10 May ===
Residents in Omdurman said that artillery shells struck The Mahdi's tomb and that widespread looting took place at the Libyan Souq. Pictures sent to the BBC by a Khartoum resident appeared to contradict the RSF's claims of the destruction of the old Presidential Palace but showed the offices in the New Republican Palace appearing to have been severely damaged by a fire.

=== 11 May ===
The United Nations Human Rights Council narrowly decided to increase monitoring of abuses amid the war in Sudan, despite opposition from the Sudanese government. 18 members voted in favor of a resolution calling for an end to the violence and broadening the mandate of a UN expert on Sudan to include monitoring of abuses "arising directly from the current conflict", while 15 members voted against and 14 abstained. UNICEF said that a factory in Khartoum producing food for malnourished children was burned down.

=== 12 May ===
During negotiations in Jeddah, Saudi Arabia, the SAF and the RSF signed an agreement to allow safe passage for people leaving battle zones, protect relief workers and not to use civilians as human shields. However, there was no agreement towards a cessation of hostilities as air strikes and shelling in Khartoum. Fighting broke out again in Geneina, leaving 77 people dead. Sudan's civil aviation authority extended the closure of the country's airspace to all but humanitarian and evacuation flights until 31 May.

=== 13 May ===
The SAF and the RSF traded blame for an attack on the Blessed Church in Omdurman which injured five people including a priest. The SAF also accused the RSF of attacking two hospitals in Khartoum while the RSF accused the SAF of "assassinating" an official of a football federation, Amir Hasaballah. Fighting continued in Geneina, where the death toll since the resumption of clashes the previous day reached 100, including an imam at the city’s mosque.

=== 14 May ===
Burhan ordered the freezing of bank accounts of the RSF and its affiliates. He also ordered the sacking of Central Bank governor Hussain Yahia Jankol and his replacement by his deputy, Borai El Siddiq, without giving an explanation. Sudan TV resumed its satellite broadcasts after going off air for a week.

Eyewitnesses in Geneina said Arab militias entered a hospital and massacred 12 non-Arab patients.

=== 15 May ===
The Sharq el-Nil Hospital in Khartoum was reported to have been hit by an air strike. The Somali embassy in Khartoum was ransacked and looted by RSF fighters.

In a voice message, Hemedti vowed to keep fighting and said that he would ensure that Burhan would be captured, tried, and then hanged in public.

=== 16 May ===
Burhan ordered the sacking of acting Interior Minister and concurrent general director of police Anan Hamed Mohammed Omar, appointing Khalid Hassan Muhyi al-Din as head of police amid observations of police inaction during the war.

The death toll from the renewed fighting in Geneina rose to over 350 as reports continued of Arab militias loyal to the RSF attacking, looting and burning homes.

=== 18 May ===
The SAF published a 23-second video showing Burhan walking among cheering soldiers at an unknown location in Khartoum. The video, which was believed to be Burhan's first recorded appearance in the field since the start of the fighting, showed him wearing a military outfit and carrying a rifle and a pistol while shaking hands with cheering soldiers.

=== 19 May ===
Burhan, as head of the Transitional Sovereignty Council, issued a decree that formally removed Hemedti as his deputy in the council and replaced him with former rebel leader and council member Malik Agar.

=== 20 May ===
Clashes occurred near Nyala's main market close to army headquarters. Almost 30 people were reported to have died in the fighting in the city in the past two days. The Qatari embassy in Khartoum was ransacked and vandalized by "irregular armed forces" as explosions and gunfire continued in the capital and its satellite cities.

A seven-day ceasefire between the two factions, brokered by Saudi Arabia and the United States, was signed in Jeddah. The ceasefire was to take effect at 9:45 p.m. Khartoum time (1945 GMT) on 22 May.

=== 21 May ===
Residents in Khartoum said heavy fighting was ongoing as the RSF tried to advance towards the SAF's main airbase at Wadi Seidna, north of the capital. RSF fighters in about 20 trucks positioned east of the Nile were trying to cross a bridge to reach the airfield, but were met by heavy artillery from the SAF. An airstrike was also reported in Omdurman.

=== 22 May ===
Fighting was reported around the Aliyaa military hospital in Omdurman and south of the city near the border with White Nile State, near a small airport.

Minutes after the pre-agreed ceasefire came into effect, witnesses told news agencies of fighting and airstrikes in Khartoum and its satellite cities.

=== 24 May ===
An SAF fighter plane was reported to have crashed in Omdurman during reduced fighting.

=== 26 May ===
Burhan sent a letter to UN Secretary-General António Guterres requesting the removal of Volker Perthes as UN Special Envoy to Sudan for interfering with the makeup of the Transitional Sovereignty Council. In response, Guterres expressed his shock at the demand, while expressing full confidence in Perthes.

The Sudanese defence ministry issued a statement mobilizing army pensioners and everyone capable of bearing arms to enlist in the SAF before clarifying that the call-up was limited to reservists and army pensioners.

=== 27 May ===
Two people were reported to have been killed in an SAF airstrike in Khartoum. Dr. Alaa Nogod, spokesperson for the Sudanese Professionals Association, was beaten and abducted from his home in Khartoum by men claiming to be from Sudanese military intelligence.

=== 28 May ===
Between 28 and 97 people were killed in the predominantly Masalit town of Misterei, West Darfur during an attack by the RSF and Arab militias.

=== 29 May ===
The SAF and the RSF agreed to an extension of the ceasefire until 3 June, as sporadic fighting continued in Khartoum and in Darfur.

The Chadian army reportedly captured 60 Arab militiamen who had entered the country while chasing refugees from Misterei.

=== 30 May ===
A curfew was declared in Port Sudan from 11pm to 5am local time (21:00 GMT to 03:00 GMT), after the Red Sea State security committee said it had caught several "rebellious" sleeper cells.

=== 31 May ===
The SAF announced it had suspended its participation in peace talks with the RSF in Jeddah, accusing them of a lack of commitment on implementing the existing ceasefire agreement and violating its terms. In response, the RSF accused the SAF of halting the talks to undermine them and of violating the ceasefire by using airpower and heavy artillery to attack its positions.

The Sudanese Doctors' Union said that at least 18 people were killed and more than 100 others were wounded after rockets hit a market in Mayo, south of Khartoum.

The Associated Press reported that at least 60 infants/children had died in the Al-Mayqoma orphanage in Khartoum as a result of the ongoing fighting causing starvation and fever.

== June 2023 ==
=== 1 June ===
The United States imposed its first sanctions related to the war, targeting two firms associated with the SAF and two others linked to the RSF. It also imposed visa restrictions against individuals involved in the violence, but did not divulge any names. The White House said that this was in response to numerous ceasefire violations and attacks on civilians committed by both sides.

In Khartoum, 19 people were reportedly killed and a further 106 were injured as a result of tank battles in the Mayo district.

The World Food Programme's warehouses in El-Obeid were looted. Officials said the amount of food stolen was enough to feed 4.4 million people.

=== 2 June ===
Artillery fire was reported around Sudan TV offices in Omdurman as the SAF announced it had brought reinforcements to Khartoum.

The RSF seized control over the National Museum of Sudan complex in Khartoum.

=== 3 June ===
40 people were reported to have been killed in two days of fighting in Kutum, North Darfur.

=== 4 June ===
The RSF claimed to have shot down an SAF fighter jet over Khartoum, while the SAF claimed that the aircraft crashed near Wadi Seidna Airbase outside the capital due to a technical malfunction.

10 students from the Democratic Republic of Congo were killed in an SAF airstrike on the International University of Africa in Khartoum.

In South Darfur, leaders of the predominantly Arab Beni Halba, Tarjam, Habaniya, Fallata, Misseriya, Taaysha, and Rizeigat tribes pledged their support for the RSF, with its leader Hemedti being a Rizeigat himself.

=== 6 June ===
It was reported that during the fighting in Geneina, the RSF had inflicted large-scale destruction on the city, killing at least 500 people according to Médecins Sans Frontières (MSF). An expected 19 million people, equating to around 40% of Sudan's population were estimated to be in a state of acute food insecurity due to the ongoing fighting.

=== 7 June ===
A fuel-storage facility located close to an army base and the Yarmouk munitions factory in Khartoum caught fire during heavy fighting.

=== 8 June ===
The Saudi embassy in Khartoum was stormed and vandalized by unidentified armed groups. Nearly 300 children were evacuated from the Mygoma Orphanage in Khartoum to a UN-operated transit center in Wad Madani.

The Sudanese government declared UN Special Envoy Volker Perthes persona non grata.

A faction of the militant Sudan People's Liberation Movement-North (SPLM-N) led by Abdelaziz al-Hilu began mobilizing around Kadugli, the capital of South Kordofan state, moving into several army camps and prompting the SAF to reinforce its positions despite an RSF blockade. This prompted fears of a new front in the conflict despite the group regularly agreeing to annual ceasefire agreements.

=== 9 June ===
The Saudi Foreign Ministry confirmed that the SAF and the RSF had agreed to a 24 hour-nationwide ceasefire starting at 6am local time (04:00 GMT) on 10 June.

=== 10 June ===
Egypt required all Sudanese nationals to obtain a visa before entering the country, preventing many refugees from crossing its land border. This led to 12,000 families being stranded in the Wadi Halfa border crossing while their visas were being processed by the Egyptian consulate.

=== 11 June ===
Fighting resumed upon the expiration of the ceasefire, with seven people reported killed in Khartoum as the SAF launched airstrikes against RSF positions. New attacks by Arab militias were reported in Geneina, with the West Darfur Doctors’ Union calling them equivalent to genocide with more than 1,000 dead. El-Obeid was reported to be under siege by the RSF.

=== 12 June ===
The RSF killed Amir Tarig, a brother of Sultan Saad Bahreldin of the Dar Masalit, Abubakar Tajeldin, a former member of the Masalit Ras El Dawla Council and 14 others in an attack on Geneina.

=== 13 June ===
17 people were killed by RSF shelling in the El Jamarik neighborhood of Geneina.

=== 14 June ===
The governor of West Darfur, Khamis Abakar, was abducted and killed by armed men hours after accusing the RSF of genocide and calling for international intervention in a TV interview. The SAF blamed his assassination on the RSF, which claimed that outlaws were responsible.

The SAF conducted its first airstrikes against RSF positions in El-Obeid.

The SAF claimed that the RSF had begun using drones, which were believed to have come from the Yarmouk munitions factory and arms depot complex in Khartoum which was seized by the RSF.

=== 17 June ===
Seventeen people, including five children, were killed in an SAF air strike around the RSF-controlled Yarmouk munitions factory in Khartoum. The RSF also claimed that the SAF launched attacks in the neighborhoods of Mayo and Mandela.

US and Saudi mediators said that the warring sides had agreed to a 72-hour ceasefire starting at 06:00 (04:00 GMT) on 18 June.

=== 19 June ===
The RSF was reported to have seized an SAF garrison in Tawila, North Darfur after fighting that started on 16 June, leaving at least seven civilians dead and large parts of the town destroyed.

The Darfur Bar Association announced the killing of two members, namely Tariq Hassan Yaqoub Al-Malik, and the West Darfur humanitarian aid commissioner Al-Sadiq Muhammad Ahmed Haroun, as well as Amir Badawi Bahreldin, cousin of the Masalit sultan, by the RSF.

The RSF was reported to have issued a three-day ultimatum on South Sudan to share oil revenues with the group and halt payment of transit fees to the SAF-led government or have the flow of its oil prevented from reaching the international market by shutting down the pumping station at Heglig, which the RSF controlled. There was no comment from the South Sudanese government.

=== 20 June ===
The headquarters of the Sudanese intelligence agency in Khartoum caught fire. The SAF accused the RSF of shelling the building, while the RSF said its destruction was the result of an SAF drone attack on an RSF position.

=== 21 June ===
The SPLM-N (al-Hilu) broke its ceasefire agreement and attacked SAF units in South Kordofan, particularly in Kadugli and in Dalang, the latter coinciding with an attack by the RSF. The SAF claimed to have repelled the attacks, while the rebels claimed to have attacked in retaliation for the death of one of their soldiers at the hands of the SAF and vowed to free the region from "military occupation." Reports from the area said that the RSF seized the Teiba military base near the town of Dibebad, with the resulting battle leading to approximately 40 SAF personnel and four RSF paramilitaries killed, while 33 SAF personnel were taken prisoner. In Dalang, the SPLM-N reportedly seized the town's police station before withdrawing, and claimed to have taken full control of the road going to Kadugli.

=== 22 June ===
South Sudan closed its border with Sudan in response to fighting on the latter's side of the border.

=== 25 June ===
The RSF claimed to have seized the headquarters of the Police Central Reserve Forces in Khartoum. The SAF said the RSF lost 400 men in the battle, while activists said 14 civilians were killed.

The SPLM-N (al-Hilu) launched attacks on SAF positions in Kurmuk, Blue Nile State, near the border with Ethiopia. 13 soldiers were reportedly injured, while the SAF claimed to have captured 20 rebels. UN monitors reported that the SPLM-N seized the SAF garrison at Deim Mansour.

=== 26 June ===
The UNHCR reported that RSF-backed militias were carrying out summary executions on people fleeing Geneina. Several bodies were also reported scattered on a road near Shukri, about 10 kilometers from Chad.

The SPLM-N (al-Hilu) gained control of several villages in the Kurmuk area.

=== 27 June ===
The RSF announced a unilateral two-day ceasefire for the Eid ul-Adha holiday. Later that same day, the SAF announced its own unilateral ceasefire for the holiday.

=== 28 June ===
Heavy fighting continued in Khartoum despite the Eid ul-Adha ceasefire declared earlier by the warring parties, with the SAF continuing to shell and strafe RSF positions in the capital.

=== 29 June ===
A massive explosion was reported near the headquarters of the Sudanese Army in Khartoum, with witnesses reporting huge columns of smoke rising from the area of the complex. Airstrikes were also launched by the SAF on RSF positions in the northwestern part of the city.

The International Committee of the Red Cross said that they had facilitated the release of 125 SAF personnel held by the RSF in Khartoum, while 14 others were released in Darfur before Eid ul-Adha.

== July 2023 ==
=== 1 July ===
The Sudanese Doctors Union accused the RSF of raiding the Shuhada hospital and killing a staff member. The RSF denied the accusation.

The SAF reportedly launched airstrikes on SPLM-N (al-Hilu) positions west of Dalang.

=== 2 July ===
The RSF claimed to have shot down an SAF fighter jet in Khartoum Bahri.

=== 3 July ===
The SPLM-N (al-Hilu) seized control of SAF bases in Servaya, El Tagola, and Um Heitan in South Kordofan. The RSF clashed with a joint force consisting of the Sudan Liberation Movement (SLM) led by Minni Minnawi (SLM-MM), the Justice and Equality Movement (JEM) led by Gibril Ibrahim, the Gathering of Sudan Liberation Forces, and the Sudanese Alliance west of El-Fasher.

=== 5 July ===
The RSF was reported to have attacked and pillaged the town of Bara in North Kordofan, 60 kilometers north of El Obeid.

=== 6 July ===
Reports surfaced that RSF forces had killed at least 20 children in massacres in Geneina over the past few weeks.

=== 8 July ===
Between 22 and 31 people were killed in an SAF airstrike on the Dar es Salaam district of Omdurman. The SAF subsequently denied carrying out airstrikes in the city on that day.

=== 9 July ===
Renewed fighting between the SAF and the RSF broke out in El-Obeid.

In South Kordofan, the SPLM-N (al-Hilu) seized SAF garrisons in Jubeiha and Rashad and blocked the road from Karkal to Kadugli.

=== 10 July ===
The Intergovernmental Authority on Development (IGAD), a regional bloc composed of eight East African states, opened a summit in Addis Ababa, Ethiopia to explore options to end the war. In a statement, the bloc said it had agreed to request a summit of another regional body, the Eastern Africa Standby Force, to consider the latter's possible deployment" to protect civilians and guarantee humanitarian access. However, the SAF boycotted the meeting after it rejected Kenyan President William Ruto as head of the committee facilitating the talks and accused Kenya of harboring the RSF. The Sudanese Foreign Ministry rejected the proposals for foreign intervention and took offense with Ethiopia and Kenya's claims that Sudan was suffering from a power vacuum.

In Blue Nile State, the SPLM-N (al-Hilu) launched another attack on Kurmuk.

=== 12 July ===
The United Kingdom announced sanctions on firms linked to the SAF and the RSF for providing funds and weapons in the war.

=== 13 July ===
The bodies of at least 87 people allegedly killed by the RSF in June were discovered in a mass grave outside Geneina. The RSF denied responsibility for their deaths. At least 34 civilians were killed in heavy artillery duels in Omdurman.

The office of the International Criminal Court's Chief Prosecutor Karim Ahmad Khan said it had launched an investigation into possible war crimes and crimes against humanity committed during the course of the war. However, its investigation was expected to be limited to the Darfur region based on regulations stipulated by a UN Security Council resolution made in 2005.

During a summit in Cairo, the SAF, the RSF and leaders of Sudan's neighboring states agreed to a new Egyptian-led initiative to resolve the war in Sudan. Egyptian President Abdel Fattah el-Sisi said the initiative would include establishing a lasting cease-fire, creating safe humanitarian corridors for aid delivery, and building a dialogue framework that would include all political parties and figures in the country. He also urged the warring sides to commit to peace negotiations led by the African Union.

=== 14 July ===
An internet and telecommunications blackout struck Khartoum during heavy fighting and lasted for much of the day.

=== 15 July ===
Five people were killed and 22 others were injured in a drone strike on the Aliya hospital in Omdurman blamed on the RSF.

In South Kordofan, the SPLM-N (al-Hilu) seized control of the Karkaraya oil field near Dalang and bombarded the headquarters of the SAF's 14th Infantry Division in the Belenga neighborhood of Kadugli with Katyusha rockets.

=== 16 July ===
The RSF was accused of attacking the Aliya hospital for a second day with drones. Five people were killed and 17 others injured in an explosion in Ombada, Omdurman.

In South Darfur, the RSF claimed to have seized the town of Kas, about 80 kilometres (50 miles) northwest of the state capital Nyala, and captured the garrison of the SAF's 61st Infantry Brigade there along with its commander, 30 officers, 13 combat vehicles with full equipment and 70 cannons. The RSF and its allies were accused of plundering the town, destroying refugee camps, killing two civilians, and abducting three others during their attack.

The RSF also claimed that a police unit in East Darfur had joined their side and received the allegiance of local tribal chieftains.

In South Kordofan, the RSF ambushed and dispersed an SAF convoy north of Dalang.

=== 17 July ===
Six people were killed in intercommunal clashes in Zalingei that lasted until the following day.

=== 18 July ===
The UN reported that 200,000 people were displaced over the past weeks.

=== 19 July ===
14 civilians were killed in an RSF drone strike in Al-Azuzab and Wad Ajeeb, south of Khartoum. The SAF claimed to have repelled an RSF attack in Al-Ashra and the Al-Dabbasin Bridge in Abu Adam, south of Khartoum, destroying 9 combat vehicles and killing several fighters.

=== 20 July ===
The SAF claimed to have regained control of Jebel Awlia, at the southern entrance to Khartoum, and killed 18 RSF soldiers during fighting in the capital and in Omdurman.

An 18-member team of Médecins Sans Frontières was attacked while transporting supplies to the Turkish Hospital in south Khartoum.

=== 22 July ===
16 civilians were killed during exchanges of rocket fire between the SAF and the RSF in Nyala. The SAF launched airstrikes on villages in the north of Gezira State for the first time.

41 people were killed in clashes between the RSF and members of the Kababish tribe in North Kordofan. Two people were killed when the RSF reportedly plundered the town of Um Rawaba.

The RSF announced that 15 officers and 527 soldiers from the SAF's 20th Division in Ed Daein, East Darfur joined its ranks.

A Masalit tribal leader told the Sudanese news outlet Ayin Network that more than 10,000 people had been killed in West Darfur.

=== 24 July ===
16 people were reportedly killed by SAF shelling on five housing blocks in Ombadda, Omdurman.

The SAF ordered the closure of the Khartoum-Bara road, citing its use by the RSF, and threatened to destroyed any vehicles using the route.

=== 25 July ===
Following a meeting in Cairo, four Sudanese political groupings, namely the Forces for Freedom and Change, the National Movement Forces, the National Accord Forces, and the National Forces Alliance, called on al-Burhan to form "a caretaker government" as soon as possible to rule the country during the war and promote dialogue.

At least 30 civilians were killed by SAF artillery attacks in Nyala after RSF forces attempted to capture a military base within the city.

Shelling in Omdurman killed at least 18 civilians.

=== 26 July ===
The RSF seized control of the town of Sirba in West Darfur, 23 kilometres north of Geneina, after a two-day battle that saw the town burned to the ground. A legal activist said at least 460 people were killed in the fighting, with attacks also reported on the Abu Surouj refugee camp.

=== 27 July ===
The RSF claimed to have attacked Wadi Seidna airbase, inflicting dozens of casualties among the SAF and destroying three fighter jets and an arms and supplies depot.

The Interior Ministry said that a police lieutenant general was killed in an attack on a base earlier in the month.

=== 28 July ===
Hemedti made his first video announcement since the start of the war, expressing his willingness to negotiate and reach a peace agreement within 72 hours if Burhan and the rest of the SAF leadership, whom he called "corrupt", were to step down. In the video, the BBC reported that Hemedti was thinner and held his arm "oddly" while holding a stick.

In South Kordofan, the SAF retreated from Mardis, its last stronghold in the Dalami area in the Habila, in the face of an SPLM-N (al-Hilu) presence.

=== 29 July ===
A child was killed and three others were injured by SPLM-N (al-Hilu) shelling of SAF positions in Kadugli.

In Khartoum, the SAF accused the RSF of killing four children during shelling of the El Remeila neighbourhood.

=== 30 July ===
Nurses of the Port Sudan Teaching Hospital Emergency Department go on strike in protest over the non-payment of salaries since the beginning of the conflict, forcing the closure of the hospital after other departments join.

=== 31 July ===
The SAF Special Task Forces attacked an RSF-held military complex near El Shajara in West Khartoum and claimed to have killed 15 paramilitaries. The SAF also claimed that 23 RSF officers had defected to their side in the past week.

Mustafa Tambour, the leader of a faction of the rebel Sudan Liberation Movement (SLM-T), announced that his forces had joined the SAF in fighting against the RSF, claiming to have inflicted 68 casualties on the latter during recent fighting in Zalingei. Tambour's brother had previously been killed by the RSF on 17 June.

== August 2023 ==
=== 1 August ===
At least 4 RSF paramilitaries and an unknown number of civilians and SAF personnel were killed in fighting in Um Rawaba, North Kordofan.

The Doctors' Hospital, northwest of Khartoum Airport, partially collapsed due to shelling, with the RSF accusing the SAF of targeting the facility in airstrikes.

Arrest warrants were issued for former Interior Minister Ahmad Harun and four other senior members of the Bashir regime who had taken refuge in Kassala after escaping from Khartoum's Kober prison during fighting in April. However, their warrants were later canceled on 11 August.

=== 2 August ===
The SAF claimed to have killed 12 RSF paramilitaries and destroyed 4 RSF vehicles in an attack on the Al-Mak Nimr Bridge connecting Khartoum and Khartoum Bahri.

The Governor of North Kordofan announced a curfew from 19:00 and 05:00 and banned the use of motorcycles and electric scooters throughout the state following recent clashes.

=== 4 August ===
The RSF claimed to have taken full control over all of Central Darfur state.

Five people were reportedly killed after the RSF launched a missile at a house in Omdurman.

Burhan, as chair of the Transitional Sovereignty Council, established a committee tasked with investigating war crimes, human rights violations, and other crimes attributed to the RSF. The committee was to be chaired by a representative of the Attorney General, and also included officials from the Foreign and Justice Ministries, the SAF, the Police, the General Intelligence Service, and the National Commission for Human Rights.

The RSF was reported to have launched an attack on Kubum, South Darfur that lasted until 6 August and killed 24 people. The town's market, as well as that of the town of Markondi were looted, while residents from those towns as well as that of neighboring Artala, Central Darfur were displaced.

=== 6 August ===
The SAF launched airstrikes and artillery on the Republican Palace in Khartoum, while the RSF claimed that it had repelled an attempt by the SAF to break a siege at the Yarmouk military complex.

In response to calls by Transitional Sovereignty Council Deputy Chair Malik Agar to support the SAF, the Sudanese Communist Party called on upon "the tribes and people of Sudan to resist calls for recruiting their youth to favour either of the warring parties". Other political groups such as the Forces for Freedom and Change-Central Council and the Sudan Revolutionary Front express similar views, declaring the following day that they had positioned themselves "equidistant" from both the SAF and the RSF.

=== 7 August ===
The SAF claimed it had raised the Siege of Zalingei and had retaken the western part of the city from the RSF.

=== 8 August ===
The SAF announced that it had conducted an "extensive combing operation" in Omdurman, claiming to have inflicted hundreds of casualties among the RSF and captured RSF general Salah Hamdan while losing four of its own personnel. The RSF denied the claims and said it had repelled the attacks killing 174 SAF personnel, injuring 300 and capturing 83 others. At least 20 civilians were also reportedly killed in the fighting.

=== 9 August ===
UN envoy to Sudan Volker Perthes was prevented from giving his regular briefing on the situation in Sudan to the UN Security Council after the government threatened to terminate his office's presence. His briefing was delivered instead by UN Assistant Secretary-General for Africa Martha Ama Akyaa Pobee, and Office for the Coordination of Humanitarian Affairs Director of Operations and Advocacy Edem Wosornu.

The Sudanese Education Ministry cancelled final examinations for primary, intermediate, and secondary schools in all war-affected states and ordered the automatic transfer of students to the next grade levels.

=== 10 August ===
The United Nations Interim Security Force in Abyei (UNISFA) said one of its helicopters was attacked in Kadugli.

=== 11 August ===
Facebook shut down the main pages of the RSF, with the company later acknowledging that it had done so due to a violation of their policy concerning Dangerous Organizations and Individuals. In an alternate account, the RSF accused the SAF of lodging complaints based on false reports that led to the removal of its pages and said it was in contact with Facebook's parent company Meta to restore them.

The SAF claimed that special forces from its 5th "Haggana" Division attacked RSF forces in the Farajallah area of El-Obeid, killing 26 paramilitaries and destroying two combat vehicles. Five people were killed by shelling in Nyala.

=== 12 August ===
The SPLM-N (al-Hilu) attacked SAF positions in Dalami, South Kordofan, injuring two civilians from shelling. The attackers were reportedly led by Abdelaziz al-Hilu himself, and withdrew the following day without inflicting casualties on the SAF.

=== 13 August ===
The SAF 11th Infantry Division based in Khashm El Girba, Kassala State, claimed that it had seized an arms cache bound for the RSF in Khartoum composed of 86 sniper rifles and 20 Kalashnikov rifles from smugglers aboard two trucks that it believed came from a "neighboring country".

Hemedti announced the formation of the RSF's own aid agency called the Sudan Agency for Relief and Humanitarian Operations (SARHO) in areas it controlled.

=== 14 August ===
The RSF claimed that up to 43 people were killed in three days of fighting in Nyala, while 12 others were killed during fighting in the Khartoum area.

The RSF attacked the town of El Khoi, West Kordofan, injuring three civilians including a journalist, seizing four vehicles including an ambulance and two others belonging to the police, and looting the town's savings bank and police station.

The SPLM-N (al-Hilu) exchanged machine-gun and rocket fire with the SAF in Kadugli, which coincided with the 69th founding anniversary of the SAF.

Two members of the same family were killed and three others injured in a landmine explosion that struck a cart in Dalang.

The leader of the Justice and Equality Movement (JEM), Gibril Ibrahim, removed four leading members from the group, including chief security officer Suleiman Sandal and chief negotiator Ahmed Tugud, officer-in-charge of Kordofan Adam Issa Hasabo, and deputy secretary for organization and administration Mohamed Hussein Sharaf, after they held secret meetings in July with RSF deputy leader and Hemedti's brother Abdelrahim Dagalo in N'Djamena, Chad.

=== 15 August ===
The Sudanese Civil Aviation authority reopened the airspace in the eastern part of the country to air traffic.

=== 16 August ===
Fighting broke out between the SAF and the RSF in the town of Al-Fulah, West Kordofan, resulting in the looting of government facilities, banks and other offices.

=== 17 August ===
Fighting resumed in El Fasher after a two-month hiatus.

The Third Front, known as Tamazuj, one of several groups based in Darfur and Kordofan that signed a peace agreement with the Sudanese government in 2020 and had been sidelined over its alleged links with Sudanese military intelligence, formally declared its alliance with the RSF. Several of its commanders had previously supported the RSF at the start of the war.

=== 20 August ===
The SAF claimed to have repelled a significant assault by the RSF on the armoured corps headquarters within the Al-Shajara military area in Khartoum, inflicting hundreds of casualties, destroying five armoured vehicles, a T-55 tank, and several combat vehicles, and capturing three tanks and several armed vehicles. It also claimed that the RSF shelled the nearby Al-Salama area with mortar fire during their retreat, killing between six and ten civilians according to conflicting sources. Over the next days however, both sides made conflicting claims over who controls the garrison as fighting continued.

The RSF accused the SAF’s 16th Infantry Division based in Nyala of plundering the local offices of the Central Bank of Sudan.

The Sudanese Foreign Ministry cancelled the diplomatic passports of 24 individuals including RSF leaders and several former members of the Transitional Sovereignty Council. Among those included were Hemedti, his spouse and his brother and deputy, Abdel Rahim Dagalo, as well as former Prime Minister Abdallah Hamdok, former council member Mohamed al-Faki, former Cabinet Affairs Minister Khaled Omer Youssef, former Foreign Minister Mariam al-Mahdi and former ambassadors Omer Manis and Noureddine Satti.

=== 21 August ===
Major General Yasir Fadlallah, commander of the SAF’s 16th Infantry Division, was reported by Burhan to have been killed "in the line of duty" in Nyala, without specifying who was responsible. However, sources Al Hadath TV that he was killed by a member of the division at its headquarters.

24 people were killed after the SAF shelled a market in Nyala.

=== 24 August ===
Burhan went outside Khartoum for the first time since the start of the war, inspecting soldiers at Wadi Seidna air base and engaging with residents of the Karari neighborhood in Omdurman before going to Atbara and Port Sudan. Burhan later acknowledged that two Sudanese Navy personnel were killed during a military operation to ensure his departure from Khartoum.

=== 25 August ===
The SAF attacked SPLM-N (al-Hilu) positions east of Kadugli Airport and in the mountains behind Hajar El Mek.

=== 26 August ===
Seven civilians were killed by an artillery shell near the central market in south Khartoum.

=== 27 August ===
A military force from a joint coalition of neutral rebel groups arrived in Nyala to maintain security in the city amid clashes between the SAF and the RSF.

Fighting between the SAF and the SPLM-N (al-Hilu) broke out in Kahliyat, South Kordofan.

=== 28 August ===
In Port Sudan, Burhan held his first meeting with his cabinet since the war began.

The SAF launched airstrikes on the RSF's Zarq military base in North Darfur, which the SAF claimed was being used as a storage point for weapons from Libya.

=== 29 August ===
At least 40 people were killed during heavy shelling between the SAF and the RSF in civilian areas of Nyala. Thirty of them died after a missile hit the Teiba Bridge where they had been hiding underneath. Six others were killed at a funeral.

Burhan arrived in Egypt for talks with President Abdel Fattah al-Sisi in his first trip outside Sudan since the war began.

The Sudanese General Intelligence Service (GIS) ordered the mobilization of former members of its Special Operations Forces, which had a history of friction with the RSF before it was dissolved in 2019.

=== 30 August ===
14 people were killed in clashes between the SAF and the RSF near El Obeid that lasted until the following day.

The SPLM-N (al-Hilu) attacked SAF positions in Dalami, South Kordofan.

=== 31 August ===
The RSF claimed to have killed hundreds of soldiers in an attack on an SAF Special Task Forces camp in El Merkhiyat in northwest Omdurman.

== September 2023 ==
=== 1 September ===
Abdelazim Suleiman Jumah, one of the leaders of the Sudan People’s Liberation Movement-North Democratic Revolutionary Movement (DRM), was killed in Nyala after his house was hit by a shell.

=== 2 September ===
At least 20 people, including two children, were killed in an SAF airstrike on the Kalakla al-Qubba neighbourhood in south-west Khartoum.

=== 3 September ===
Yousef Izzat, an adviser to Hemedti, met with African Union Commission chair Moussa Faki to discuss efforts to end the war, drawing condemnation from the Sudanese Foreign Ministry.

The SPLM-N (al-Hilu) attacked an SAF base in Kadugli.

In West Darfur, the RSF and allied militias attacked the towns of Gorni and Abu Suruj, reportedly abducting two mayors.

=== 4 September ===
Following his visit to Egypt, Burhan went to South Sudan to meet with President Salva Kiir.

25 people were killed in fighting in Omdurman, while the RSF claimed to have shot down two Antonov planes of the SAF in Khartoum.

Local rebel militias in El Fasher thwarted an attempt by the RSF to enter the city's Grand Market.

=== 5 September ===
Egypt reopened commercial flights with Sudan for the first time since the start of the war, with EgyptAir recommencing services between Cairo and Port Sudan.

32 people were killed by SAF shelling in Ombada, Omdurman.

=== 6 September ===
Burhan issued a constitutional decree ordering the dissolution of the RSF.

The United States imposed sanctions on Abdelrahim Dagalo, and Abdel Rahman Jumma, the RSF's top commander in West Darfur, over "extensive" human rights violations during the war, in particular accusing Jumma of being behind the assassination of the state's governor Khamis Abakar in June.

=== 7 September ===
A senior official of the Justice and Equality Movement (JEM) claimed that the RSF raided the residence of its leader, Gibril Ibrahim, in the al-Manshiya neighborhood of Khartoum and arrested his former guard commander and two others before taking them to RSF headquarters in Khartoum Bahri.

Following his trip to South Sudan, Burhan went to Qatar to meet with its emir Sheikh Tamim bin Hamad.

=== 8 September ===
A series of drone strikes were launched against RSF positions in the Khartoum area, with CNN subsequently reporting that it was "likely" that Ukrainian Special Operations Forces carried out those strikes against the paramilitaries, who were reportedly receiving military support from the Wagner Group.

=== 9 September ===
30 people were killed during clashes between the SAF and the RSF in El Fasher.

=== 10 September ===
At least 51 people were killed by an SAF airstrike on the Gouro market in Khartoum.

Burhan went to Eritrea to meet with President Isaias Afwerki.

=== 11 September ===
An RSF field commander who was allegedly involved in looting in Khartoum Bahri was arrested by police in Atbara.

=== 12 September ===
17 people were killed by RSF shelling in Omdurman. At least 104 people were killed by shelling throughout Khartoum, including at least 30 who were killed in the Hilet Kouko cattle market near Sharg El Nil.

=== 13 September ===
At least 45 people were killed by SAF airstrikes in Nyala.

Burhan went to Turkey to meet with President Recep Tayyip Erdoğan.

Volker Perthes resigned from his position as UN special envoy to Sudan. In his final report to the UN Security Council, he said his office had received credible reports of the existence of 13 mass graves in Geneina that contained the bodies of predominantly Masalit civilians killed by the RSF and allied militias.

The RSF retreated from Um Rawaba, North Kordofan.

=== 14 September ===
Hemedti threatened to form a separate government based in Khartoum if Burhan and the SAF proceeded to consolidate its regime in Port Sudan.

=== 16 September ===
The SAF claimed to have repelled an attack by the RSF on its General Command headquarters in Khartoum. The RSF was also reported to have attacked the Justice Ministry and several other government officers.

Burhan went to Uganda to meet with President Yoweri Museveni.

=== 17 September ===
The Sudanese Tax Office and the 18-story Greater Nile Petroleum Oil Company Tower, a landmark of central Khartoum, caught fire during fighting between the SAF and the RSF in the area, which also destroyed the offices of the Sudan Standards and Metrology Organisation and spread to the Airport Road and the headquarters of the El Shajara Engineers Corps. The SAF accused the RSF of setting fire to the buildings, as well as looted and burning the Khartoum Sahel and Sahara Bank tower.

The SAF attacked RSF positions in El-Obeid and retook the Al-Hasahissa camp in Zalingei from the RSF.

After returning to Port Sudan from Uganda, Burhan left for New York City as head of the Sudanese delegation to the 78th United Nations General Assembly. His deputy in the Sovereignty Council, Malik Agar, announced that a new caretaker government would be unveiled after Burhan's return.

=== 18 September ===
Fighting broke out in Port Sudan between the SAF and followers of Beja tribal leader Dirar Ahmed Dirar, also known as Sheiba Dirar, the head of the Alliance of Eastern Sudan Parties and Movements, near the latter's headquarters.

=== 19 September ===
The UNHCR reported that at least 1,200 children under the age of five had died of Measles and starvation in refugee camps in White Nile State between May and September 2023. The WHO also said that between 70-80% of hospitals in conflict-affected states were out of service.

=== 20 September ===
One civilian was killed after the RSF attacked the town of El-Odeya, West Kordofan and burned its police station.

The RSF claimed to have shot down an SAF bomber aircraft in Khartoum.

=== 21 September ===
At the UN General Assembly, Burhan urged the international community to declare the RSF a terrorist organization and warned that the conflict could "spill over to other countries in the region".

The Sudanese National Academy of Sciences (SNAS) called on global academic institutions to aid university faculty and students displaced by the war, which also ravaged Sudan's research community and damaged over 100 universities and research centres. SNAS requested that colleagues in national academies provide admission to Sudanese students and professors and sought contributions for rebuilding the war-ravaged facilities.

=== 23 September ===
The Sudan Liberation Movement-Nur faction (SLM-Nur) occupied Tawila following the withdrawal of the SAF from the area.

Burhan returned to Sudan following his attendance at the UN General Assembly in New York.

=== 27 September ===
The SAF repelled an SPLM-N (al-Hilu) attack on Kadugli.

In Khartoum, the SAF accused the RSF of bombing and destroying the headquarters of the Humanitarian Aid Commission located near the army headquarters.

=== 28 September ===
Ten people were killed and 11 others were injured after the RSF reportedly shelled a transport station in the Aljarafa area in the north of Omdurman.

The United States imposed sanctions on former foreign minister and leader of the Sudanese Islamic Movement Ali Karti, the Sudan-based GSK Advance Company Ltd, and the Russia-based military company Aviatrade LLC, accusing Karti and other Islamist hardliners of obstructing efforts towards a ceasefire and accusing the firms of supporting the RSF.

=== 30 September ===
Three people were killed and five others were injured after a humanitarian aid convoy traveling from Port Sudan to El Fasher was attacked by gunmen from the Ziyadiya who fought with the convoy's escorts from the Darfur Joint Protection Force as it was passing through El Kuma, North Darfur.

== October 2023 ==
=== 1 October ===
Nine people were killed in clashes in Omdurman.

The RSF claimed to have seized the SAF garrison in Wad Ashana, east of Um Rawaba and near the El Obeid-Kosti highway in North Kordofan, and attacked another SAF base at Kilometer 44, southwest of Um Rawaba.

=== 2 October ===
A lawyers' group accused the RSF of laying siege to Tuti Island in Khartoum and blocking vital supplies, movement and activity of residents.

The SAF claimed that ten people were killed by RSF shelling in the El Jarafa neighborhood of Omdurman.

=== 3 October ===
At least 20 people were killed after an RSF shell reportedly hit a clinic attached to a mosque in the Samarab neighborhood of Khartoum Bahri.

The RSF accused the SAF of attacking and "severely damaging" the Ethiopian Embassy in Khartoum.

=== 4 October ===
The SAF claimed to have thwarted a massive attack by the RSF led by Colonel Salah Al-Fouti on the headquarters of the 16th Infantry Division in Nyala.

Four people were killed in clashes between the SAF and armed residents from the Misseriya tribe in Muglad, West Kordofan.

=== 5 October ===
Eleven people were killed by shelling in the Karari neighborhood of Omdurman.

A Médecins Sans Frontières vehicle was fired on between an SAF and an RSF checkpoint while traveling from Wad Madani to Khartoum. None of the passengers were injured

=== 6 October ===
The RSF claimed to have seized control of Al-Ailafoon, 30 kilometres east of Khartoum, and established positions in Al-Bashaqra, Wad Rawah, and Al-Aidij in Gezira State. However, the SAF denied the claims.

=== 8 October ===
Four people were killed in clashes between the SAF and the RSF in El-Obeid.

=== 9 October ===
Three people were killed by shelling on the Al-Nau hospital in Omdurman.

At least 190 people were reported to have been killed following two days of RSF artillery shelling of SAF air defense positions on Jebel Awlia, Khartoum.

=== 15 October ===
The commander of the SAF's 17th Infantry Division in Sennar State, Major General Ayoub Abdel Qader, was killed along with several others in RSF shelling of the Armoured Corps headquarters in Khartoum.

An RSF convoy consisting of at least 50 combat vehicles entered White Nile State for the first time, reaching as far as al-'Alqa village in the northern part of the state.

=== 20 October ===
SAF Major General Mohamed Alawi Koko Mukhir, Chairman of the Joint Supervisory Committee in Abyei, announced his defection to the RSF along with 320 soldiers. In response, Burhan ordered his retirement from the SAF.

=== 23 October ===
Two people were killed in an RSF attack on the El Hasahisa refugee camp in Zalingei.

13 people were killed in clashes between the Salamat and Habbaniya tribes in South Darfur.

=== 24 October ===
Three members of the Darfur Joint Protection Force were killed in an RSF attack on their base in Nyala.

The SPLM-N (al-Hilu) attacked the town of Lagawa, West Kordofan.

=== 26 October ===
The RSF claimed to have seized control of Nyala and the headquarters of the SAF's 16th Infantry Division in the city.

Three people were killed after a shell hit the El Khamees Market in Zalingei.

Negotiations between the SAF and the RSF resumed in Jeddah.

=== 30 October ===
In the morning, the RSF claimed to have taken the Balila oilfield and its airport in West Kordofan, along with 15 SAF vehicles before withdrawing in the evening. It also accused the SAF of burning the airport. 16 people wearing "military uniforms" were reported killed.

The International Committee of the Red Cross facilitated the release of 64 SAF soldiers held by the RSF in Khartoum.

=== 31 October ===
The RSF claimed to have taken the headquarters of the SAF's 21st Infantry Division in Zalingei. It also attacked advanced positions of the SAF's 6th Infantry Division in El-Fasher and shelled the Al-Takrir neighborhood.

Burhan visited Khartoum and Omdurman for the first time since leaving for Port Sudan and abroad, during which he addressed SAF personnel at the Karari and Wadi Sedna garrisons.

== November 2023 ==
=== 2 November ===
The RSF attacked the Ardamata refugee camp in Geneina, killing about 1,300 people including six tribal leaders and injuring 2,000 others over the next three days. About 310 were reported missing.

Burhan announced a partial cabinet reshuffle in which five ministers were replaced, including Livestock Minister Abdel Hafiz Abdel Nabi, the deputy head of the Sudanese Alliance who is also a relative of Hemedti and the brother of RSF Financial Affairs Officer and the Chairman of the RSF-owned Al-Sayha newspaper, Mustafa Abdel Nabi.

The SAF said it had regained full control of Balila oilfield and airport.

=== 3 November ===
Al-Hadi Idris, the leader of both the Sudan Liberation Movement–Transitional Council (SLM-TC) and the Sudanese Revolutionary Front, was removed from the Sovereignty Council by Burhan. In response, Idris called Burhan "the igniter of war" and questioned his dismissal, calling it a violation of the Juba Agreement.

=== 4 November ===
The RSF claimed to have taken the headquarters of the SAF's 15th Infantry Division in Geneina.

At least 15 people were killed after the RSF shelled the Zaglouna market in Karari, Omdurman.

=== 5 November ===
The RSF seized the Shag Omar oilfield in Abu Karinka, East Darfur and attacked the Zarga Um Hadid oilfield in Adila. It also claimed to have captured the main gate of the SAF's El-Shajara garrison in Khartoum.

=== 6 November ===
Major Babakir Musa, a field commander of the SLM-MM, was killed in an ambush blamed on the RSF in Shaqra, near El-Fasher. Two of his companions were injured.

The RSF invaded the besieged SAF pocket containing the Armored Corps headquarters, briefly occupying it before withdrawing, anticipating artillery and air strikes, while the SAF claimed they were pushed back with heavy losses.

=== 7 November ===
The RSF seized the SAF garrison in Umm Keddada, North Darfur, following the SAF's withdrawal from the area. A convoy of 30 SAF vehicles arrived in Chad after fleeing the RSF in Geneina.

An explosion occurred at the El Jeili oil refinery north of Khartoum, with the RSF claiming that it was bombed by the SAF while the latter blamed the incident on an RSF fuel tanker which exploded due to negligence.

Saudi Arabia announced that no progress towards a ceasefire had been reached during negotiations between the SAF and the RSF in Jeddah, while past agreements to improve access to humanitarian aid were reiterated.

=== 8 November ===
Nine people were killed while 76 families were displaced after the RSF attacked the village of Abu Hamra in Um Rawaba, North Kordofan.

The RSF was reported to have closed the border between Sudan and Chad.

Clashes in Omdurman continued, with the SAF assaulting RSF positions in the west while the RSF bombarded SAF positions in the north of the city.

=== 11 November ===
The SAF and the RSF traded blame for the destruction of the Shambat Bridge linking Omdurman and Khartoum Bahri in the early morning, which was reported to have been done using explosive charges.

=== 12 November ===
The RSF claimed to have seized control of the Al-Nujoumi Air Base in Jabal Awliya, which the SAF denied. It also launched an attack on the Jabal Awliya dam bridge in what was seen as an effort to connect RSF positions in both sides of the Nile and open a route to White Nile State. Twelve people were killed by shelling in Karari, Omdurman.

=== 15 November ===
The RSF imposed a ban on residents of West Darfur from fleeing to Chad with limited exceptions shortly after seizing the border post at Kereneik.

=== 16 November ===
The SLM-MM and the JEM announced that they would join the SAF in military operations against the RSF.

Ten people were killed in tribal clashes in Burum, South Darfur.

The Sudanese government announced that it was terminating the United Nations political mission in the country (UNITAMS).

=== 17 November ===
UN Secretary-General António Guterres appointed Algerian diplomat Ramtane Lamamra to be his envoy to Sudan.

=== 19 November ===
The SAF accused the RSF of shelling a road bridge over the Jebel Aulia Dam, causing the bridge to collapse and land near a dam gate without damaging the facility. In response, the RSF accused the SAF of responsibility for the attack.

The RSF seized the Abu Sufyan oil field in Abu Karinka, East Darfur, with reports emerging of "widespread plundering of facilities and properties" in the facility. SAF forces were reported to have withdrawn from their garrisons in Abu Karinka and Adila.

Authorities in Al Qadarif State closed the Gallabat border crossing with Ethiopia to civilian traffic.

=== 20 November ===
The RSF claimed to have seized control of the SAF garrison in Jabal Awliya, as well as a bridge in the area linking Khartoum and Omdurman.

Fighting broke out in Ed Daein between the SAF and the RSF, with the latter claiming to have seized control of the city's airport.

Seven people were reportedly killed by SAF bombing in El Hamra, North Kordofan.

Burhan issued a decree removing al-Tahir Abu Bakr Hajer, the leader of the Gathering of Sudan Liberation Forces (GSLF) from the Sovereignty Council. In response, Hajer called his dismissal illegal and called for a meeting of the council accompanied by other members dismissed by Burhan. Meanwhile, Hajer's deputy, Abdallah Yahya, and Abdallah Banda, leader of the Gathering of the Sudanese Justice and Equality Forces (GSJEF), announced their alignment with the SAF against the RSF.

=== 21 November ===
The RSF claimed to have seized the headquarters of the SAF's 20th Infantry Division in Ed Daein, while SAF forces were reported to have withdrawn eastwards. At least 40 civilians were killed while at least 50 others were injured by retaliatory SAF airstrikes in the vicinity of the garrison.

=== 22 November ===
Burhan ordered a cabinet reshuffle that affected the Interior, Justice, Industry and Religious Affairs ministries and replaced the governors of Al-Jazira, Kassala, Northern, and West Kordofan states. He also removed the governors of South Darfur and Central Darfur, both of which were under RSF control, but did not name their replacements.

=== 23 November ===
The RSF reportedly took control of an administrative unit in El Odeya, West Kordofan, following the withdrawal of SAF forces in the area.

=== 24 November ===
Dozens were reportedly killed in a suspected airstrike on the Khartoum Central Market.

Reinforcements from the SLM-Nur and the GSJEF arrived in El Fasher to augment the Darfur Joint Protection Force and the SAF against the RSF.

The RSF attacked the SAF garrison near Babanusa, West Kordofan.

=== 27 November ===
SAF Deputy Commander-in-Chief Lieutenant-General Yasser al-Atta arrived in Port Sudan after breaking out of the Corps of Engineers headquarters in Omdurman, where he had been besieged since the start of the conflict, and flying out from Wadi Sedna air base. On the same day, the RSF claimed to have attacked Wadi Seidna, "destroying a C130 military transport aircraft and an ammunition depot", and attacked the SAF garrison in Muglad, forcing the latter's withdrawal.

The JEM announced that it and other Darfur rebel groups who were signatories of the Juba Peace Agreement in 2020 had reached an agreement with the SLM-Nur to protect civilians in El Fasher from an RSF attack.

=== 28 November ===
Nine people were killed in clashes between herders near Delling, with the town's mayor accusing one of the warring parties of "employing RSF personnel".

== December 2023 ==
=== 1 December ===
The UN Security Council voted not to renew UNITAMS' mandate upon its expiry on 3 December.

=== 2 December ===
Four people were killed in an SAF airstrike in Kokoti, North Kordofan.

=== 3 December ===
The SLM-Nur seized an RSF garrison in Deribat, South Darfur.

Negotiations between the SAF and the RSF in Jeddah were indefinitely suspended by Saudi, US, and African mediators due to the failure of both parties to fulfil their obligations, including implementing agreed-upon confidence-building measures and withdrawing military forces from key cities.

A contingent of the Darfur Joint Protection Force from Libya was deployed in Um Marahik, north of El Fasher.

=== 4 December ===
Five members of the same family were killed after a shell fell on their house in Omdurman.

The US imposed sanctions on three former officials of the Bashir regime, namely former minister and presidential aide Taha Osman Ahmed al-Hussein and former directors of the Sudanese National Intelligence and Security Services Salah Abdallah Mohamed Salah a.k.a. Sala Gosh and Mohamed Etta Elmoula Abbas, citing Al-Hussein's involvement in coordinating with regional actors to support the RSF, Gosh's plotting to overthrow the civilian-led transitional government, and Elmoula's attempts to restore the Bashir regime to power.

=== 5 December ===
Four people were killed after the RSF attacked and destroyed the village of Tukma, which hosts a garrison of the SPLM-N (al-Hilu), in South Kordofan.

A strike was called by doctors at the Bashaier Hospital in Khartoum after its medical director and another medical staff were attacked by the RSF.

=== 6 December ===
97 people were killed in SAF airstrikes on the Kandahar livestock market and a residential block in the Dar El Salam neighborhood of Khartoum.

The RSF claimed to have taken control over the database centre of the Sudan Telecommunications Group (Sudatel), located in southwestern Khartoum and regarded as one of the largest in Africa.

The SAF and the RSF accused each other of causing another explosion at the El Jeili oil refinery.

=== 7 December ===
Five people were killed in SAF airstrikes in Jabra al-Sheikh, North Kordofan.

=== 9 December ===
Three Sudanese diplomats were ordered expelled from the UAE following comments made by SAF deputy commander Yasser al-Atta during which he accused the UAE of supporting the RSF and called the country a "mafia state".

=== 10 December ===
Two people were killed while seven others were injured after the SAF opened fire on a Red Cross convoy trying to evacuate civilians trapped in the El Shajara neighborhood in southwest Khartoum.

Sudan ordered the expulsion of 15 Emirati diplomats amid reports that the UAE had been providing weapons to the RSF.

=== 11 December ===
37 people were killed by shelling between the SAF and the RSF in the El Thawra neighborhood of northwest Omdurman.

=== 12 December ===
The SAF claimed to have intercepted two weapons shipments to the RSF at the Upper Atbara and Setit dam complex in Gedaref state.

=== 14 December ===
Six people were killed in SAF airstrikes in Nyala. Among areas targeted were the RSF garrison, the city's airport and civilian areas.

The RSF attacked the town of Abu Gouta in Gezira state, killing at least one civilian and plundering businesses.

=== 15 December ===
Authorities closed all entrances to Wad Madani after the RSF launched attacks outside the city. Hundreds of refugees were reported to have fled to Sennar, while authorities declared a nighttime curfew across the state. All humanitarian field missions within and from the state were also suspended.

Two people were killed in an RSF attack on Abu Haraz, near Wad Madani.

=== 16 December ===
Two people were killed after the SAF attacked RSF positions near the Abu Shouk IDP camp, north of El Fasher.

The RSF was reported to have entered the Hantoub area of Wad Madani and seized the local headquarters of the Central Reserve Police and the courthouse. The town of Rufaa, 60 km north of Wad Madani, was also reported to be under siege from the RSF.

=== 17 December ===
Four Sudanese diplomats were expelled from Chad following accusations of Chadian support for the RSF by SAF deputy commander Yasser al-Atta. Sudan ordered three Chadian diplomats to leave the country. Sudanese Minister of Finance and Head of the JEM Gibril Ibrahim called for the severing of diplomatic relations with Chad, and filling a complaint with the United Nations Security Council against Chad and the UAE for their alleged interference in Sudanese affairs.

RSF fighters established a base in the east of Wad Madani, causing thousands of already displaced people to flee the city. The SAF claimed to have pushed back an RSF assault on the city.

Authorities in Sennar State and Northern State declared a state of emergency and imposed curfews after fighting between the RSF and SAF broke out nearby.

=== 18 December ===
The RSF said it had seized control of the headquarters of the 1st Brigade of the SAF'S 1st Infantry Division in Wad Madani, as well as the eastern entrance to the Hantoub Bridge, and shot down an SAF MiG fighter jet. The RSF also took over Rufaa and Al-Junaid, with reports emerging of looting. Two people were shot and killed by the RSF inside Rufaa hospital.

The SAF was later reported to have withdrawn from Wad Madani towards Sennar, leaving a small group of soldiers inside the headquarters of the SAF's 1st Infantry Division who were captured by the RSF after putting up resistance.

=== 19 December ===
The RSF claimed to have taken full control over Gezira State following the fall of its capital Wad Madani. In response, the SAF said that it would launch an investigation into its performance in the area, the first time it had done so after a defeat at the hands of the RSF.

=== 21 December ===
The RSF claimed to have taken the town of al-Hasaheisa, Gezira State and the garrison of the SAF's 2nd Infantry Division there. It also entered White Nile State and took over the town of El Geteina, along with its SAF garrison, and were reported to be advancing into Sennar.

The World Food Programme temporarily suspended aid to over 800,000 people in parts of Gezira State due to the ongoing fighting there.

=== 23 December ===
Dozens were killed in fighting between the RSF and the SLM-Nur in Nierteti in the Marrah Mountains of Central Darfur that lasted until the following day.

The SAF and the RSF traded blame for another attack on the El Jeili oil refinery.

Clashes broke out between the SAF and the RSF in Wad Al-Haddad, Gezira State, while the RSF seized the Sennar Sugar Factory and were spotted "15 kilometres north" of Sennar.

Eight people were killed while trying to resist looting by the RSF in the village of Artadhwa.

=== 24 December ===
Faris Elnur, the chief negotiator for the RSF in peace talks in Jeddah, resigned from his position, accusing the SAF of obstructing the peace process.

The SAF conducted airstrikes against RSF positions at the Sennar Sugar Factory.

=== 27 December ===
In his first known appearance outside of Sudan since the war began, Hemedti met with Ugandan President Yoweri Museveni in Kampala.

The Egyptian Foreign Ministry announced the evacuation of 18 Egyptian students and some of their relatives in Wad Madani. It also urged its citizens to leave Sudan quickly and refrain from traveling there.

=== 28 December ===
Hemedti visited Addis Ababa and met with Ethiopian prime minister Abiy Ahmed.

=== 29 December ===
The SAF carried out another airstrike on Nyala, killing at least 118 people and displacing thousands.

River Nile State governor Mohamed al-Badawi issued an ultimatum to RSF supporters as well as members of the Forces of Freedom and Change (FFC) to leave the state within 72 hours.

=== 30 December ===
The RSF offered villagers in Gezira State protection in exchange to join their ranks.

The SAF raided and ransacked the headquarters of the Sudanese Congress Party in Port Sudan and arrested four people, including two party officials, in what was seen as a crackdown on anti-war figures.

=== 31 December ===
The RSF seized control of Habila, South Kordofan.

Hemedti visited Djibouti and met with president and concurrent IGAD chair Omar Guelleh to discuss peace talks.

The JEM called on the United Nations Security Council to impose a no-fly zone over Sudan in response to SAF airstrikes.

Human rights groups voiced criticism over the detention of activists by the SAF's Military Intelligence and Islamist groups, believed to be an effort by the former Al Bashir regime to regain power.
