= Kalakla =

Neighbourhood in Sudan

Kalakla الكلاكلة
- Municipality
- Location in Sudan
- Coordinates: 15°28′4.1″N 32°29′8.2″E
- Country: Sudan
- State: Khartoum
- Founded: 1510 or 1511
- Elevation: 384 m (1,260 ft)
- Time zone: Central Africa Time, GMT + 3

Kalakla (Arabic: الكلاكلة) is one of the residential localities located in the southern Khartoum State, Sudan, near the Jabal al-Awliya locality.

== Location ==
The Kalakla neighbourhood is located between latitude 15.4678 degrees and longitude 32.4856 degrees, within the Jabal al-Awliya locality. It is bordered to the east by the lands of Mahas and to the northwest by the Haraz Umm Qaddad, north of al-Azuzab. It ends on the eastern side in Eid Hussein, and extends southward to al-Dukhinat, while it parallels the course of the White Nile River to the west.

== Great Kalakla ==
Kalakla is divided into several regions:

- Kalakla al-Qaala (Arabic: الكلاكله القلعة, Qaala is Arabic for Citadel), which is the oldest. It was called the citadel because it is elevation
- Abuam
- Kalakla al-Qubba (Arabic: الكلاكلة القبة, Qubba is Arabic for dome), formerly Kalakla Hasa (Arabic for gravel). It contains the most famous dome in the region, which is the dome of the tomb of Abdul Qadir Wad Umm Maryum, who was one of the first to inhabit the area.
- Kalakla Sanqa'at (Arabic: الكلاكلة صنقعت) which was given this name because of its highness, and the pronunciation "Sanqa" in Sudanese colloquial language means raising the head to see what is above it.
- Kalakla East (Arabic: الكلاكلة شرق)
- Kalakla al-Wehda (Arabic: الكلاكلة الوحدة, al-Wehda is Arabic for unity)
- Kalakla al-Munawara (Arabic: الكلاكلة المنورة)
- Kalakla al-Lafa (Arabic: الكلالكلة اللفة) is located in the southern side
- Kalakla Wad-Amara (Arabic: الكلاكله ودعماره)

== Naming ==
There were many opinions about naming the Kalakla region by this name. The most likely opinion is that Fatima daughter of Al-Mak Hasaballah was called "Kalkala Al-Rabatah" during the era of the Zarqa Sultanate. She was believed to be a horsewoman who was good at riding and handling horses and lived west of the White Nile (now Fatasha) with her father and four brothers. Her father was a "Hambati" meaning a bandit, blocking the way of convoys coming from the other side, and Fatima was participating in these robberies and plundering operations. She would say to the bandits with her, "Kalkala the horses and attack!", and the "kalkala" in language is to goad with the spurs, especially on the side of the horse. When she was caught and Hamdallah bin Muhammad Al-Awadi took her as a captive. Hamdallah Al-Awadi invited her to train his children in horse riding who learned the war cry "Kalkala the horses and attack!".

== History ==
=== Formation ===
The history of Kalakla goes back approximately 450 years, since the arrival of Sheikh Ali bin Muhammad bin Kanna to the Al-Manjara area (today's Al-Muqrin area in Khartoum), coming from Al-Azhar Al-Sharif in Egypt. He is form Kawahla people. Hamdallah bin Muhammad Al-Awadi also came to the region in the same era from Shendi in the River Nile State. The two intermarried and the name Kalakla came to include all of them. The ancient Kalakla people migrated from Al-Manjara to the today's Kalakla, an area located south of Al-Hammadab and Al-Shajara. The Kalakla people worked in agriculture, and cutting trees and lumber.

=== During the Turco-Egyptian occupation of Sudan ===
During the Turco-Egyptian occupation of Sudan the rulers of Khartoum at the time, fortified the city of Khartoum by digging a protective trench and a wall around it, they placed the gate on the southwestern side in the Kalakla area and called it the Kalakla Gate. The Mahdi Army, led by Prince Abd al-Rahman al-Nujoumi, camped near the gate to attack Khartoum. There was another gate, the Muslimiya Gate.

=== During the Mahdist State ===
With the emergence of Muhammad Ahmad al-Mahdi in Sudan and his announcement of the establishment of the Mahdist state, two famous scholars in the region were residing in Kalakla: Sheikh Abd al-Qadir Wad Umm Maryoum, whose headquarters was in Kalakla al-Qaala, and Sheikh al-Nazir Khalid al-Mahi, who resided in Kalakla al-Qubba. The Mahdist state appointed Sheikh Abdul Qadir, as the eldest at the time, as emir and judge in the region. He, in turn, presented Sheikh Al-Nazir to the council of Caliph Abdullah Al-Taayshi. He was the leader of the Mahdist state at that time to contribute to resolving a jurisprudential issue.

The Caliph appointed him as a judge and promoted him to the corps of judges in recognition of his efforts in resolving the issue until he reached the rank of judge of judges at the end of the Mahdist state. Thus, there were two judges in Kalakla during the era of the Mahdist state, along with a number of princes. Among them is Prince Al-Faki Dafallah Balalakla Al-Qatii, who mobilized the Kalakla tribe in the field of jihad to support the Mahdist state.

=== During the Anglo-Egyptian occupation of Sudan ===
During the Anglo-Egyptian occupation of Sudan, following the fall of Khartoum and the decline of the Mahdist state, the two prominent judges—Sheikh Abdul Qadir Wad Umm Maryum and Sheikh Al-Nazir Khalid—returned to Kalakla and continued their mission in spreading the Fiqh and the Qur’an. Sheikh Al-Nazir's Mosque and its retreat became an institute that included more than 30 students from outside Kalakla, especially from the regions of Al-Jazira and the White Nile in central and northern Sudan.

=== Kalakla and the National Movement ===
The youth and notables of Kalakla became members of the Omdurman Graduates Conference, which called for the right to self-determination and Sudan's independence from dual rule. Some of them also joined the Brothers’ Party through Sheikh Sharif Ibrahim Khojali and Sheikh Ibrahim Jadallah, who were sons of Kalakla and who were studying at the Omdurman Scientific Institute and reside on Tuti Island.

=== Modern era ===
During 2019–2022 Sudanese protests, on May 29 security forces attacked a demonstration in Kalakla neighbourhood of Khartoum with tear gas and bullets. One protester died on the spot while another died from injuries in the hospital. On May 30, 33 people were wounded in an attempt by police to disperse a protest.

At the start of the 2023 war in Sudan, on 24 April, seven people were reportedly killed in an air strike on a residential area in Kalakla. During the war, in July, Kalakla Al-Qubba area witnessed widespread violations committed by the Rapid Support Forces (RSF), including reported cases of killing, looting, and rape. In September, water and electricity to Kalakla neighbourhood were cut off. In the same month, at least 20 people—including two children—were killed in a Sudanese Armed Forces (SAF) airstrike on the Kalakla al-Qubba neighbourhood in south-west Khartoum.

== Landmarks ==
- Central Reserve Forces (Abu Tira) Command
- Kalakla Turkish Hospital
- The tomb of the two famous scholars, Sheikh Abdul Qadir and Dam Maryum in Kalakla al-Qalaa, and Sheikh Al-Nazir Khalid Al-Mahi in Kalakla al-Qubba, through whom the sciences of Islamic law were disseminated
- Sheikh Ali Fatai Al-Ulum mosque in Kalakla Al-Qubba, which was founded 500 years ago
- Sheikh Al-Rukini Ibrahim Complex
- Dome of the shrine of Sheikh Wad Jadallah, give good news
- Dome of the shrine of the jurist Al-Faki Dafa Allah
- Khalawi Sheikh Ibrahim Al-Zein. There has been a Khalwa since the Zarqa Sultanate, which is the typical Kalakla Sanqaat Khalwa, which was established in 1885.
