= May 2023 Mayo shelling =

Civilian shelling in Sudan (2023)

- Part of Battle of Khartoum and War crimes during the Sudanese civil war (2023–present)
- Location: Mayo, Khartoum, Sudan
- Date: May 31, 2023
- Deaths: 18–27
- Injuries: 100–106
- Perpetrator: Sudanese Armed Forces (alleged by locals)

On May 31, 2023, shelling from the El Shajara neighborhood of Khartoum hit the neighborhood of Mayo, south of Khartoum, Sudan, during the Battle of Khartoum. Eighteen to 27 people were killed, and over 100 were injured. The shelling resulted in the largest single-event death toll since the war began on April 15.

== Prelude ==
The 2023 war in Sudan began on April 15, 2023, after the paramilitary Rapid Support Forces (RSF) attempted to overthrow the Sudanese government led by Abdel Fattah al-Burhan. The coup attempt plunged the Sudanese capital Khartoum and its two sister cities, Omdurman and Bahri, into grueling urban warfare. The Mayo neighborhood, south of Khartoum, became a haven for internally displaced Khartoum residents as it was largely unaffected by the warring parties. The al-Shajara neighborhood was one of the last places under Sudanese Army control in Khartoum proper.

The two sides agreed to a ceasefire on May 20, but it was violated repeatedly. The ceasefire was extended on May 29, and sporadic clashes occurred leading up to the shelling.

== Shelling ==
The shelling reportedly came from SAF-controlled al-Shajara neighborhood. Six tank shells from the neighborhood hit the Souq Sitta market, in Mayo neighborhood. Residents reported that the shelling hit several other areas, including parts of Yarmouk neighborhood, al-Andalus al-Harat neighborhoods, and parts of al-Azhari neighborhood. The dead and injured were ushed to Bashaer Governmental Teaching Hospital, one of few left open in the city. Initially, seventeen people were reported killed, with 106 injured. The toll later rose to 18 to 27 killed, with doctors claiming it could go higher due to lack of medical services.

The following day, local emergency rooms reported further shelling in the area, with five killed and twenty-six injured. Most of the shelling targeted Mayo again, but parts of it hit al-Azhari and Yarmouk neighborhoods.

== Aftermath ==
As a result of the shelling in Mayo, the United States and Saudi Arabia suspended the extension of the ceasefire resulting from the Treaty of Jeddah due to "serious violations" by the RSF and SAF. The day after the shelling, the United States also announced sanctions on top Sudanese officials.
