= Sudanese protests =

Sudanese protests may refer to:

- 2011–2013 Sudanese protests
- 2018–19 Sudanese protests
- 2019–2022 Sudanese protests
