= Jabra =

Jabra may refer to:

== Given name ==
- Jabra Ibrahim Jabra (1919–1994), Palestinian author
- Jabra Nicola (1912–1974), Palestinian Trotskyist leader
- Jabra Al-Zarqa, Syrian footballer

== Places ==
- Jabra, Khartoum, one of the neighbourhoods of Khartoum, Sudan

== Other ==
- Jabra (brand), electronics company in Denmark
- "Jabra Fan", a song by Nakash Aziz in the 2016 Indian film Fan
- Jabra, a member of CP9 in the manga One Piece
