= Mayo district =

Mayo district can refer to:

- Mayo district, Pattani
- Mayo district, Khartoum
