= Tarjam =

Village in Sudan

Tarjam ترجام
- Location in Sudan
- Coordinates: 11°55′0″N 24°49′59″E
- Country: Sudan
- State: South Darfur
- Elevation: 660 m (2,170 ft)
- Time zone: Central Africa Time, GMT + 3

Tarjam (Arabic: ترجام), or Tegram, is a tribal area located in South Darfur, Sudan, that is home to mainly Tarjam tribal, part of the Baggara Arabs tribe.

== History ==
The area is an active area of tribal clashes due to the war in Darfur. During the Abala-Tarjam tribal clashes in 2007, 34 were killed from the Tarjam tribe.

During the Fur-Tarjam tribal clashes in 2013, 7600 families were displaced.
