= Abu Adam =

Neighbourhood in Sudan

Abu Adam ابو آدم
- Neighbourhood
- Location in Sudan
- Coordinates: 15°29′33″N 32°29′29″E
- Country: Sudan
- State: Khartoum
- City: Khartoum
- Founded: late 1970s
- Time zone: Central Africa Time, GMT + 3

Abu Adam (Arabic: ابو آدم), or Abu Adam neighbourhood (Arabic: حى أبوآدم) and was officially known as Al Farouk City (Arabic: مدينة الفاروق), is one of the neighbourhoods of Khartoum, Sudan, located in the southern side of Khartoum.

== Background ==
Abu Adam was originally designed in the late 1970s. Then Al-Farouk City, entered a latent period where its growth was minimal until the mid-1990s. In the past 10 years, the city has begun to gain momentum and construction is taking place almost everywhere. The first settlers had to live without electricity and running water supply for a long time and the only option was to finance and buy water pipes and electric cables in addition to paving roads. Now the basic infrastructure like electricity and water is part of the city grid.

During the 2023 Sudan conflict, on 10 July, the Sudanese Air Force bombed the areas of Abu Adam and Jabra, south of Khartoum. On 19 July, the Sudanese Armed Forces (SAF) claimed to have repelled an Rapid Support Forces (RSF) attack in Al-Ashra and the Al-Dabbasin Bridge in Abu Adam, south of Khartoum, destroying 9 combat vehicles and killing several fighters. On 30 July, the SAF accused the RSF of randomly bombing Abu Adam which led to the death of a child aged 8.
