= Central Reserve Forces =

Militarised police unit in Sudan

Central Reserve Forces قوات الاحتياطي المركزي
- Common name: Abu Tira
- Abbreviation: CRP

Agency overview
- Formed: 1974; 52 years ago
- Employees: +8,000

Jurisdictional structure
- National agency: SD
- Federal agency: SD
- Operations jurisdiction: SD
- Governing body: Ministry of Interior (Sudan)
- General nature: Federal law enforcement; Military police; Civilian police

Operational structure
- Headquarters: Kalakla, Khartoum
- Agency executive: Lieutenant General Al-Siddiq Al-Ubaid Abdullah, Commander

Notables
- Person: Ali Kushayb, for Commander of South Darfur (2013)
- Significant Battles: War in Darfur; Sudanese civil war (2023–present); Battle of Khartoum (2023–2025); Battle of Al Maliha

The Central Reserve Forces (CRP) (Arabic: قوات الاحتياطي المركزي), also known as Abu Tira (Arabic: أبو طيرة) due to the eagle on its logo, is a militarised police unit in Sudan known for committing atrocities during the War in Darfur and the Sudanese revolution. The CRP is sanctioned by the US for "serious human rights abuses".

== History ==
The idea of having a central reserve forces came in 1970 when the Khartoum Directorate established a civil defence force consisting of one faction, trained in the Federal Republic of Germany, to be reserve forces for the police forces in Khartoum State and other states, especially in riots and demonstrations, in order for the regular police to devote themselves to performing their role in preventing or detecting crimes. Then the Sudanese Central Reserve Forces were established in 1974 pursuant to Republican Decree No. 475 issued by the President Gaafar Nimeiry. They are police forces within 6 basic units of the Sudanese Police, whose command is directly under the Ministry of Interior. The CRP was then led Colonel Ismat Manni.

Since 1992, the CRF officially falls under the Ministry of Interior and operates under the mandate of the 1992 Police Force Law. However, in practice, the CRP has operated as an auxiliary force to the National Intelligence and Security Services (NISS) under former president Omar al-Bashir, and this arrangement survived NISS's transition to the General Intelligence Service (GIS) in 2019, following al-Bashir's ouster from office. The CRP is the largest police department and has it headquarters is in Kalakla, Khartoum.

The CRP has been involved the War in Darfur, and has responded to peaceful protests with rape, killing and torture. For instance, on 17 January 2022, the CRP and the anti-riot police were deployed to suppress demonstrations across Khartoum, where it used live ammunition. On 21 March 2022, the CRP was sanctioned by the US.

During the war in Sudan that started on 15 April 2023 between the Rapid Support Forces (RSF) and Sudanese Armed Forces (SAF), the CRP announced it would be deploying officers to the streets of Khartoum to "secure public and private property", as one of several paramilitary groups intervening on the side of the SAF. On 25 June, the RSF seized the headquarters of the CRF in Khartoum. During the Battle of Wad Madani, the RSF seized the CRP camp near Hantoub bridge. On 31 October, troops of the Sudan Revolutionary Front (SRF) attacked the CRP camp in Mershing, South Darfur, killing three and injuring four in the attack.
