= 2019–2022 Sudanese protests =

Protests against the military of Sudan

- Part of the Sudanese Revolution
- Date: 12 September 2019 – 2022
- Location: Sudan
- Caused by: RSF killings of civilians; Toxic effects of cyanide and mercury from gold mining in Northern state and South Kordofan; Show trials of SPA coordinators; October–November 2021 Sudanese coup d'état
- Goals: New Chief Justice and Attorney General; Dismissal and trials of al-Bashir government officials; Release of Abdelrahman Hassan, arrested in Cairo during the 2019 Egyptian protests; Khartoum massacre investigation
- Methods: Street protests
- Result: 2 October 2019 – Abdelrahman Hassan released in Cairo; 10 October 2019 – Nemat Abdullah Khair becomes Chief Justice, el-Hibir Attorney-General; 20 October 2019 – Nabil Adib to head Khartoum massacre investigation; 21 November 2021 – All political prisoners released, Abdalla Hamdok reinstated as prime minister; Prime minister Abdalla Hamdok resigns in January 2022; Protests suppressed

Casualties
- Deaths: 333 protesters (including 220 dead in October 2022 tribal clashes); 1 police officer
- Injuries: 4,400+

The 2019–2022 Sudanese protests were street protests in Sudan which began in mid-September 2019, during Sudan's transition to democracy, about issues which included the nomination of a new Chief Justice and Attorney General, the killing of civilians by the Rapid Support Forces (RSF), the toxic effects of cyanide and mercury from gold mining in Northern state and South Kordofan, opposition to a state governor in el-Gadarif and to show trials of Sudanese Professionals Association (SPA) coordinators, and advocating the dismissal of previous-government officials in Red Sea, White Nile, and South Darfur. The protests follow the Sudanese Revolution's street protests and civil disobedience of the early September 2019 transfer of executive power to the country's Sovereignty Council, civilian prime minister Abdalla Hamdok, and his cabinet of ministers. Hamdok described the 39-month transition period as defined by the aims of the revolution.

== Background ==
Eight months of street protests and sustained civil disobedience in Sudan, which began on 19 December 2018, led to a political agreement and Draft Constitutional Charter defining a 39-month political transition period beginning in September 2019 and formally transferring executive power to the Sovereignty Council of Sudan, civilian prime minister Abdalla Hamdok, and his cabinet of ministers. Gilbert Achcar described the transition period as the fourth phase of the revolution. People used social media applications such as Facebook and Telegram to help organize the protests.

== Timeline ==
=== September 2019 ===
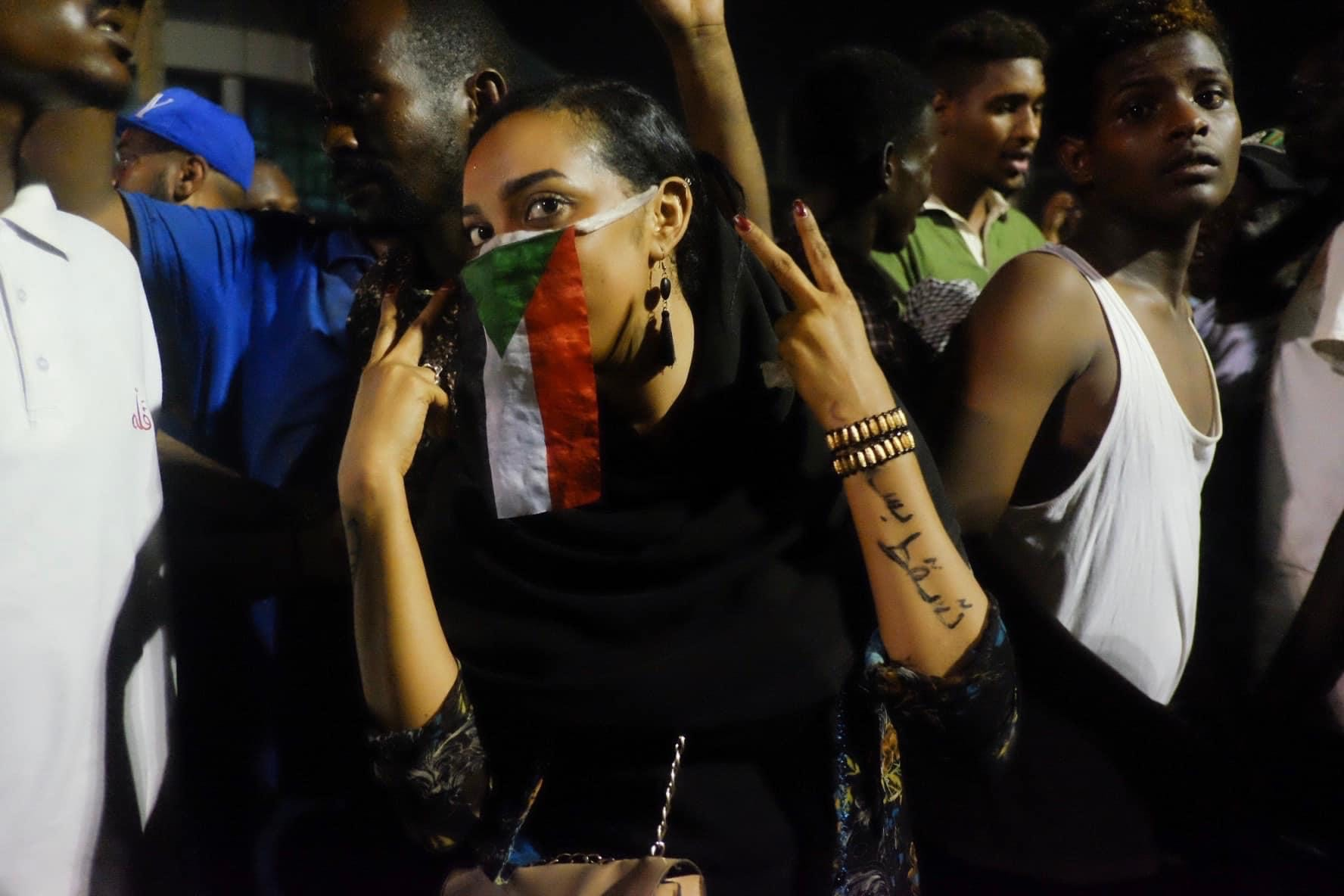
Sudanese women (Kandake) protesting in 2019, by Ola Alsheikh

Two thousand protesters in Khartoum and other cities on 12 September and 20,000 protestors in Khartoum, Wad Madani, and Port Sudan the following week called for Abdelgadir Mohamed Ahmed to be appointed Chief Justice and Mohamed el-Hafiz attorney general, for the creation of a Khartoum massacre investigation commission, and for senior members of the previous government to be tried in Sudanese courts or extradited to the International Criminal Court investigation in Darfur. Displaced people protested in Mershing, South Darfur on 15–16 September and in Nyala on 17 September after armed men wearing Rapid Support Forces (RSF) uniforms killed University of Zalingei student Munir Hamid, Adam Mohamed, Hashim Karameldin, and Radwan Abdelrahman. Protestors considered the transition government responsible for the deaths, and called for "the militias" to be disarmed.

On 17 September, residents of Simit and other villages in Northern State protested against the construction of a new mine by the Hamid Mining Company because of the risk of pollution from mercury and cyanide used during extraction. That day in Khartoum, people from South Kordofan called for mining to be suspended (ordered by the governor of South Kordofan, but disobeyed by some mining companies). Protestors displayed photographs of victims of the cyanide used in mining and called for local companies (including El Sunut, al-Junaid – also known as Juneid – and Abarsi) and international companies to stop mining.

On 18 and 19 September, the Sudanese Professionals Association (SPA), the Sudanese resistance committees, government employees, and local residents organised protests in el-Gadarif calling for the removal of the state governor because of the governor's "anti-revolutionary position" and the failure of government-controlled radio and television to report about flood victims and activities of the Forces of Freedom and Change (FFC). On those days, the SPA also protested in front of courts in Geneina against the trials of eight SPA coordinators, which they considered show trials punishing SPA members for organising protests and a strike. Teachers and other public servants in Red Sea called on 18 September for senior officials of the previous government to be dismissed.

Engineers and other workers in the White Nile Sugar Workers Union in White Nile called on 17 September for officials of the previous government to be dismissed. Employers of the protestors dismissed three of the engineers and investigated others, which the protestors' committee (the Temporal Committee for the Restoration of the White Nile Sugar Workers Union) considered retaliatory.

On 22 September, Sudanese police used tear gas against students protesting in Nyala, South Darfur against bread shortages and transport failures and calling for the state governor to be dismissed. The FFC condemned the "use of tear gas and live bullets against peaceful protestors", calling for the appointment of civilian governors and an immediate investigation of police actions.

Two thousand people demonstrated in front of the Foreign Affairs Ministry and the Egyptian Embassy in Khartoum on 26 September in support of Waleed Abdelrahman Hassan (also known as Walid Abdulrahman), a Sudanese student arrested in Cairo for alleged participation in the 21 September Egyptian street protests. The SPA called for Abdelrahman Hassan to be allowed to contact his family and choose a lawyer, without torture or coercion. Abdelrahman Hassan's friends and relatives said that an apparent confession broadcast by MBC Masr on 26 September in which he declared support for the Muslim Brotherhood in Egypt was forced; Abdelrahman Hassan had long opposed Islamists in Sudan under the Omar al-Bashir government (for which he was arrested in 2013 and 2018) and during the Sudanese Revolution. Mohammed Saleh, his friend, described the idea of Hassan supporting the Egyptian Muslim Brotherhood as "unbelievable". The SPA called the video broadcast "shameful": "We stress here that the era when Sudanese citizens were humiliated inside or outside their country has gone and will never return." Abdelrahman Hassan was freed on 2 October.

=== October 2019 ===
On 13 October, protestors in el-Hilaliya, Gezira began a sit-in calling for the administrator of el-Hilaliya to be dismissed, for the security committee to be dissolved, and for improvements in education, health care, electricity and the environment. The administrator was dismissed on 19 October. The week-long sit-in continued on 20 October, with protestors considering a move to the state capital (Wad Madani) if their demands were not met.

On 18 October, protests against the use of cyanide and other toxic chemicals in gold mining took place in Talodi. Protestors called for the Rapid Support Forces (RSF) to stop guarding the mining plants, for the amir of Talodi to be dismissed, and for improved Talodi Hospital services. The RSF struck protest supporter Hussein Noureljalil in the head with rifle butts; army forces rescued Noureljalil and brought him to Talodi Hospital.

On 21 October, 20,000 people in Khartoum's Freedom Square and Sudanese towns called for the National Congress Party (NCP, which dominated politics during the al-Bashir government) to be dissolved and its senior members tried in court. There were no reports of casualties. Prime Minister Abdalla Hamdok gave a speech commemorating the 55th anniversary of the 1964 uprising in which he said, "the revolution needs greater efforts to be completed and achieve its goals"; Hamdok had fired several top bureaucrats from al-Bashir's government the previous week. The 21 October protestors also called for a full, transparent investigation of the 3 June Khartoum massacre, including of members of the civilian-military Sovereignty Council who were formerly members of the Transitional Military Council.

=== November 2019 ===
On 11 November, Suakin residents blocked the main road between Port Sudan and Tokar in protest against a week of electricity shutdowns. In Abu Naama, Sennar that day, activists burnt the offices, fuel depots, tractors and factories of the Kanaf Abu Naama project in protest against carcinogens. Security services detained two residents.

Nyala University students demonstrated in front of local administrative offices that day to protest against the lack of public transport, and called for university staff vehicles to help transport students. In Abu Ushar, Gezira, demonstrators burnt tyres and blocked a major highway to protest a flour shortage and the deterioration of other services. Jaafar Mohamedein of the Kanabi Congress, representing the Kanabi (seasonal workers recruited from Darfur and elsewhere in western Sudan who were settled in Gezira, protested against racism by government and the local population at a Khartoum meeting with Mohamed Mahala, representing Sovereignty Council member Mohammed al-Ta'ishi and Sudan Liberation Movement/Army-Minni Minnawi members. Mohamedein called for the Kanabi to be allowed to participate in the political process and for the creation of a Sovereignty Council commission to uphold their rights.

=== December 2019 ===
Demonstrators in Tawila, North Darfur, protested on 11 December against armed attacks by camel and cattle herders on farmers and people living in camps for those displaced by the war in Darfur. Two hundred demonstrators protested in West Darfur two days later against corruption and shortages of bread and fuel, calling for the state governor to be dismissed.

On 17 December, students at the University of Ed Daein in East Darfur protested against the drowning of a student in a groundwater tank, accusing the al-Bashir-era Student Support and Welfare Fund of negligence. Farmers in North Darfur blocked roads, protesting against the theft and destruction of crops by "outlaws".

=== January 2020 ===
Two thousand women demonstrated in Khartoum on 2 January, marching to Prime Minister Hamdok's office and submitting a petition signed by 46 citizens' groups and 13 political parties calling for Sudan to ratify the Convention on the Elimination of All Forms of Discrimination Against Women. The women said that a list of nominees for state governor contains men only, and they called for laws against female genital mutilation and child marriage.

Agents of the former National Intelligence and Security Service rebelled on 15 January, clashing violently with the forces of their former employer (the General Intelligence Service) in Khartoum. According to Al Jazeera, two soldiers were killed and four were wounded. Sovereignty Council member Mohamed Hamdan Dagalo attributed responsibility to former intelligence chief Salah Gosh. Gosh allegedly escaped to Egypt after Bashir's government was overthrown by Sudanese armed forces, but Egyptian authorities did not confirm Gosh's location.

Ethiopian refugees rallied in front of UN Refugee Agency buildings in Khartoum on 27 January, saying that their rights as refugees were not recognised and they could not acquire a nationality by naturalisation or resettlement. Twenty demonstrators in front of the Ministry of Foreign Affairs in Khartoum the following day called for the return of relatives involuntarily deployed to Libya and Yemen as mercenaries in the Second Libyan Civil War and Yemeni civil wars. The demonstrators said that their relatives were deceived by Black Shield, an Emirati company which led them to believe that they would be employed as security guards in the UAE. The victims' families also protested outside the Emirati embassy in Khartoum that day. About 50 young men returned from Libya that day and joined the protests outside the UAE embassy. On 31 January, a day after Sudanese Finance Minister Ibrahim al-Badawi announced an 18-month plan to reduce fuel subsidies, the Sudanese Professionals Association (SPA) called for a "million-man march" in Khartoum as an "expression of national unity" against government policies.

=== February 2020 ===
Demonstrators outside government headquarters in Khartoum on 4 February protested against a secret 3 February meeting between Sovereignty Council chair Abdel Fattah al-Burhan and Israeli Prime Minister Benjamin Netanyahu; Israel said that the countries had agreed at the meeting to normalise relations. The two-hour meeting was held in Entebbe, Uganda, and the Sudanese government said that it had not been notified of the meeting. Political and religious figure Abdullahi Yousif said that Burhan did not have permission to meet with the Israeli prime minister without authorisation from other government officials, and described the meeting as a betrayal for Allah. High-ranking military officers met at army headquarters in Khartoum and expressed support for the Burhan–Netanyahu meeting.

Human Rights Watch said on 12 February that former president Omar al-Bashir would answer for his crimes in Darfur (since Sudanese leaders plan to cooperate with the International Criminal Court), but support from Sudan's military was uncertain. According to Al Jazeera, the decision was reached when rebel groups and Sudanese transition authorities held peace talks in the South Sudan capital of Juba. The BBC said that three more people were expected to be handed over to the ICC in addition to al-Bashir. According to a senior Sudanese official, the government is trying to figure out a way that al-Bashir and the three others can appear before the ICC without being extradited to the Hague.

The Sudanese Professionals Association called for a protest against the government on 20 February, after the dismissal of officers who aided the revolution which led to the April 2019 removal of Omar al-Bashir. As hundreds of protesters gathered to demand for the reinstatement of officers and soldiers who were dismissed, security forces fired tear gas in an attempt to disperse the crowd. Reuters said that at least 17 people were reportedly injured in the crackdown, and the victims were urged by the Sudanese Doctors Central Committee to visit the Federal Hospital to receive appropriate treatment.

Hundreds of protesters in Abu Jubeiha, South Kordofan, rallied in the streets on 24 February to protest against a state-government decision to permit the resumption of mining by two companies which have significantly polluted the region. The European Union pledged €100 million five days later to Sudan's transitional government, to aid the country's deteriorating economic situation. According to representative Joseph Borrell Fontells, the EU was willing and ready to ensure a smooth political transition with every means available. Darfur24 reported that Fontells was also expected to visit North Darfur after his two-day visit in Khartoum.

=== March 2020 ===
One hundred nine ambassadors, diplomats and administrators linked to Omar al-Bashir were sacked from the Ministry of Foreign Affairs by the Empowerment Removal Committee of Sudan on 1 March. According to Reuters, assets of the former ruling party were also confiscated by the committee the previous month. The committee was created by law in November 2019 to dismantle the al-Bashir government.

Physicians for Human Rights announced on 5 March that an investigation into the use of violence by armed security forces against pro-democracy protesters in the June 2019 Khartoum sit-in indicated that up to 240 people were killed and more than 100 wounded. According to the group, its report was based on eyewitnesses, interviews with health practitioners, and online video footage and photos of the attacks. Doctors associated with the protest movement said that at least 128 people were killed; authorities numbered the deaths at 87, and denied authorising the attack. PHR accused Sudanese security forces of excessive force against pro-democracy protesters in its report, urging UN member states to ensure that perpetrators were held accountable.

An Amnesty International investigation reported on 9 March the involvement of all branches of Sudan's security forces in violence against protesters in 2018 and 2019, which included killing. The organisation called on Sudanese authorities to bring those responsible for the death of protesters to justice without resorting to capital punishment.

=== June 2020 ===
On 3 June, demonstrators in Khartoum called for justice for the dozens of protesters killed in the 3 June 2019 crackdown. Protesters burnt tires and held up signs and photos of Rapid Support members considered responsible for the killings. Roads in Khartoum were shut down as protests were also reported in other Sudanese towns and cities. Prime Minister Abdalla Hamdok, commemorating the anniversary of the crackdown in a televised statement, assured the public that its perpetrators would be brought to justice.

A Sudanese anti-corruption committee said that Omar al-Bashir's bank account was seized on 9 June, and five foreign-exchange bureaus which served his administration were closed. The committee reported that monthly transactions of millions of U.S. dollars (up to $20 million, according to Dabanga TV) were believed to have been funnelled through the confiscated account.

Hundreds protested in Khartoum on 10 June against the formation of the United Nations Integrated Transition Assistance Mission in Sudan (UNITAMS), created to aid the country's political transition. Anadolu Agency reported that protesters waved banners and the Sudanese flag in opposition to foreign domination. In an attempt to break up a crowd which gathered near army headquarters, security forces reportedly fired tear gas.

Thousands of 29 June street demonstrators in Nertiti, Central Darfur, called on security forces to stop daily attacks by gunmen in the region. Protesters demanded increased protection and justice and disarming of the gunmen. The day before a sit-in began, unknown gunmen reportedly killed a woman and a Sudan Armed Forces (SAF) soldier near a camp in Nertiti.

Street protesters gathered in Khartoum, Omdurman and Khartoum North on 30 June, calling for rapid reform and larger civilian leadership in Sudan. Support for Abdalla Hamdok's government was expressed, with urging that their demands be met. The Sudan Doctors Central Committee reported that one person was fatally shot in the chest and 44 others were shot or injured by tear gas during the peaceful rally. Similar protests were held in eastern Sudan's Kassala and elsewhere as demonstrators shut down roads, burnt tires and chanted anti-Bashir slogans.

=== July 2020 ===
According to UrduPoint, protesters in Nertiti continued their sit-in outside a government office for the fourth consecutive day on 3 July and threatened to continue the demonstrations until their demands were met. After the protests, Prime Minister Abdalla Hamdok said that a delegation would be sent by the government to the region. Dabanga reported that protesters had already rejected a delegation from the Central Darfur security committee who visited the state capital, Zalingei. Protesters believed that after they filed several complaints about insecurity in the region, state officials have made insufficient effort to end the attacks.

Reuters reported that on 5 July, Sudan's transition government said that the chief of police and his deputy had been dismissed as protesters continue to demand justice for officials associated with the al-Bashir government. Prime Minister Abdalla Hamdok tweeted that Ezz Eldin Sheikh Ali had replaced Adel Mohamed Bashaer as director-general of the country's police force. Although the Sudanese parliament gave no reason for the dismissal of the top officials, both were accused by several pro-democracy groups and protesters of ties with the al-Bashir government.

During a sit-in in the village of Fatabarno in the state of North Darfur, a militia reportedly opened fire; a police station and several cars were reportedly burnt by unknown protesters in the town of Kutum. Demonstrators called for a civilian government and improved security. A state of emergency was declared by the provincial government, and more troops would be sent to the affected areas. The United Nations–African Union Mission in Darfur (UNAMID) said that it sent a delegation to Kutum amidst ongoing violence in the area. North Darfur acting governor Malik Khojali assured the UNAMID and other humanitarian organisations that peace had been restored in Kutum and Fatabarno and urged relief organisations to aid victims of the violence.

Demonstrators in Khartoum criticised government reforms, which they considered anti-Islamic, on 17 July. Protesters in east and north Khartoum joined the demonstrations, which began after Friday prayers. Reforms included permitting non-Muslims to consume alcohol and decriminalising conversion from Islam to another religion. During Friday prayers at mosques across the country, the government was criticised for varying from Islamic law.

On 21 July, former president Omar al-Bashir was brought to a Khartoum courtroom to face trial for participating in the 1989 coup which brought him to power. Despite being sentenced for corruption, the possibility existed that al-Bashir might receive the death penalty if convicted for the 1989 coup. Al-Bashir was wanted by the International Criminal Court (ICC) for crimes against humanity, genocide and other war crimes in Darfur. The trial was adjourned until 11 August, when it would resume in a larger court.

UN officials said on 26 July that a new wave of violence had begun in West Darfur, killing over 60 people and injuring 60. About 500 gunmen reportedly attacked Masteri, north of Beida, setting houses and part of the local market on fire. About 500 local residents reportedly organised a protest calling for increased security, refusing to bury the dead until immediate action was taken by authorities. Prime Minister Abdalla Hamdok assured a delegation of women that a joint army-police security force would be dispatched to ensure the protection of residents and agricultural products.

=== August 2020 ===
Protesters took to the streets in Khartoum on 17 August to demand faster reforms, including the election of a legislative body. Near the Council of Ministers, several protesters were sighted waving Sudanese flags and chanting for reforms. Demonstrators in Omdurman and other cities were said to have joined the protests, with most gathering outside cabinet headquarters in Khartoum.

Mike Pompeo was the first US secretary of state to visit Sudan on 25 August since Condoleezza Rice's 2005 visit. Pompeo met with Sovereign Council chair Abdel Fattah el-Burhan in Khartoum, and also planned to meet with Prime Minister Abdalla Hamdok. The US State Department said that the meeting aims to address US backing of Sudan's transition government and strengthen relations between Sudan and Israel. Hamdok told Pompeo that he was not yet authorised to normalise ties with Israel.

Protests on 28 August in the eastern town of Kassala became violent when supporters of Governor Saleh were accused of killing four protesters and wounding six. Several people were said to have stormed the Kassala Grand Market with knives and sticks, setting shops ablaze. After the clashes, the Sudanese government declared a state of emergency in Kassala and sent security reinforcements to avoid further violence.

On 31 August, the government signed a peace deal in Juba with Sudan's top five rebel groups in an attempt to resolve long-standing conflicts. The agreement aims to address land ownership, security, power-sharing, and allowing insurgents to join the army. Despite the union of rebel groups from Darfur and the states of South Kordofan and Blue Nile (including the Sudan Revolutionary Front), two other groups reportedly abstained from the peace process.

=== October 2020 ===
On 3 October, the transition government reached a peace agreement with a number of rebel groups in an attempt to resolve conflicts. The deal was signed during a ceremony in Juba by the Sudanese government, the Sudan Revolutionary Front (SRF), and a coalition of rebel groups. According to France 24, rebel groups in Darfur and southern Sudan refused to participate in the peace process. President Abdel Fatah al-Burhan, Prime Minister Abdalla Hamdok, South Sudan Vice President Riek Machar, and dignitaries from Somalia, Uganda, and Chad attended the signing. Other signatories included the African Union (AU), the European Union and the United Nations. In addition to the three groups which signed a preliminary agreement in August, Abdelaziz al-Hilu's Sudan People's Liberation Movement-North agreed to peace talks with South Sudan in September.

Protesters responded to the peace deal by shutting down the road connecting Port Sudan and Khartoum and the port's container terminal the following day. The protests reportedly linked to members of the Port Sudan Workers Union. Union leader Aboud el-Sherbiny said that workers in Port Sudan and Suakin had begun a strike demanding termination of the agreement, and would continue the protests unless the government met their demands. South Sudan President Salva Kiir called on the international community to provide assistance in implementing the peace agreement.

On 13 October, Kassala governor Saleh Ammar was sacked by Prime Minister Abdalla Hamdok over inter-tribal conflict and the Port Sudan blockade. Ammar's dismissal, three months after his appointment, was followed by protests which led to the deaths of at least five people and several others injured. The governor accused supporters of al-Bashir of responsibility for the protests. After his appointment in July, Ammar had to remain in Khartoum because demonstrators prevented him from entering Kassala. In response to Ammar's dismissal, demonstrators shut down roads and burnt tires in Kassala.

Two days later, clashes surrounding Ammar's firing killed eight protesters and wounded several others. Sudanese information minister Faisal Mohamed Saleh said that a three-day state of emergency was declared in Kassala by the central government.

On 21 October, due to Sudan's deteriorating economic condition, protesters returned to the streets of Khartoum and Omdurman. Major roads and bridges linking the military headquarters and presidential palace were shut down by security forces, who reportedly fired tear gas at protesters. According to the Sudan Doctors' Committee, at least one protester was killed and several others injured.

US President Donald Trump announced on 23 October that a deal had been reached normalising relations between Sudan and Israel. The agreement, which removes Sudan from the US list of state sponsors of terrorism, is contingent on approval by Sudan's legislative council. Protesters in Khartoum denounced the deal, which was also criticized by the country's political parties.

=== November 2020 ===
On 23 November, the Forces of Freedom and Change announced that the formation of a transition government would be delayed until the end of 2020. Three days later, Sadiq al-Mahdi (the last democratically elected prime minister, ousted by Omar al-Bashir) died of COVID-19. Al-Mahdi's family said that he died after three weeks of treatment in a hospital in the United Arab Emirates. After his death, a three-day period of mourning was declared by Prime Minister Abdalla Hamdok and flags across Sudan were flown at half-mast.

=== December 2020 ===
The US embassy in Khartoum said on 14 December that Sudan had been removed from its list of states sponsoring terrorism. US Secretary of State Mike Pompeo described the removal as an essential advance in enhancing cooperation between the US and Sudan's transition government. Sudan expressed its gratitude for the removal, and Prime Minister Abdalla Hamdok said that it would have a positive impact on the country. Turkish foreign ministry spokesman Hami Aksoy praised the decision, long-awaited by Turkey.

On 19 December, thousands of protesters took to the streets to mark the second anniversary of the protest movement which resulted in the overthrow of Omar al-Bashir. The protesters' major demand was faster reforms (particularly economic), with some demanding the dissolution of the ruling coalition. In anticipation of the protests, major roads linking the government and military headquarters were closed by security forces.

Protests also took place in Omdurman and other Sudanese cities. Protesters who marched towards the presidential palace, demanding a sit-in until a parliament is formed, were reportedly met with security forces who fired tear gas and sound grenades. No immediate casualties were reported.

On 21 December, Human Rights Watch reported that Sudanese security forces had killed seven protesters and wounded at least 25 during unrest in Eastern Sudan's Kassala on 15 October. A 16-year-old boy was reportedly one of the fatalities. HRW called on the transition government of Sudan to ensure that the perpetrators were brought to justice, blaming police and the Rapid Support Forces for firing at demonstrators.

Tribal clashes erupted in South Darfur's Gireida between Masalit farmers and Fallata herders on 26 December, which left at least 15 people dead and dozens wounded. In West Darfur's El Geneina, a student was reportedly shot dead. According to South Darfur governor Musa Mahdi, military forces were deployed to the region to seize weapons and capture those responsible for the clashes.

On 29 December, dozens of Sudanese protesters took to the streets in Omdurman to demonstrate against the killing of pro-democracy activist Bahaa Eddine Nouri. Nouri was reportedly kidnapped on 16 December from a Khartoum cafe by unidentified men in a vehicle without license plates, and his body was discovered days later in an Omdurman hospital morgue. According to medical reports given to Sudan's attorney general, Nouri was tortured to death in an RSF facility.

According to RSF spokesman Gamal Goma, the head of its intelligence unit and other officers who were part of Nouri's capture and torture were apprehended or suspended while his death was investigated. After Nouri's killing, the Sudanese Professionals Association urged additional protests if the Sudanese government and the RSF did not respond in 15 days.

The UNAMID ended its peacekeeping mission in Darfur on 31 December after 13 years, with the Sudanese government responsible for public safety in the region. After the UNAMID's departure, the United Nations Integrated Transition Assistance Mission in Sudan (UNITAMS, a UN political mission) is expected to be put in place to assist the Sudanese government in disbursing aid and maintaining peace. According to the UN, the withdrawal of peacekeepers (which will begin in January) will be concluded within six months.

=== January 2021 ===
On 24 January, several protesters took to the streets of Khartoum to protest against Sudan's worsening economic situation. Protesters reportedly burnt tires, set up barricades, and closed streets in Khartoum and Omdurman. In an effort to disperse the protesters, police reportedly fired tear gas. Sudanese Congress Party president Omar El Degeir urged the transition government to stop turning a blind eye on the increasing protests, try to tackle the economic situation and speak to the protesters.

=== February 2021 ===
On 7 February, Prime Minister Abdalla Hamdok announced the dissolution of his cabinet. According to the Transitional Sovereignty Council media office, a new cabinet was expected to be announced shortly. On 8 February, Hamdok introduced a new 20-minister cabinet. Darfur rebel leader Gibril Ibrahim was named finance minister, and National Umma Party leader Mariam al-Mahdi was named foreign minister. Hamdok was confident that the cabinet reshuffle would succeed. The Turkish Foreign Ministry expressed its approval of the move, and said that it would strengthen the peace in Sudan.

On 9 February, protests broke out in several Sudanese cities due to worsening living conditions. Security forces used tear gas to disperse the protesters, who destroyed government buildings and burnt tyres. Several markets were reportedly looted. The following day, the new cabinet was sworn in at the presidential palace in Khartoum by Sovereign Council head Abdel-Fattah Burhan.

On 21 February, in an attempt to tackle the country's deepening economic crisis, the Central Bank of Sudan devalued the Sudanese pound. The move, which had been delayed for months, was made in accordance with the International Monetary Fund and other foreign donors. According to Finance Minister Jibril Ibrahim, the reform of Sudan's customs exchange rate was still in progress because it was not part of the devaluation.

=== March 2021 ===
On 28 March, in an attempt to reach a lasting peace which would allow for the separation of religion and the state, the Sudanese government and a rebel group from its southern Nuba Mountains signed a peace agreement. The agreement, signed in the South Sudan capital Juba by Sovereign Council chair Abdel-Fattah al-Burhan and Sudan People's Liberation Movement-North leader Abdul Aziz Alhilu, was expected to enable the final peace agreement. After the signing of the agreement on Sunday, the lone security challenge to the transition government is a faction of the Sudan Liberation Movement/Army (SLA).

On 31 March, the United States said that it had received a $335 million settlement from Sudan as compensation for the victims of terror attacks. The payment was part of an agreement which would remove Sudan from the United States list of state sponsors of terrorism.

=== April 2021 ===
On 8 April, hundreds of women took to the streets in Khartoum to protest against gender-based discrimination and advocate for reforms. One protester was reportedly injured by a vehicle, and its driver was apprehended by security forces. A key demand was justice for rapists and abusers of women, in and outside the home.

=== May 2021 ===
On 11 May, hundreds rallied outside army headquarters in Khartoum to protest the 2019 killings. According to the Sudanese army, two people were killed in an attempt to break up the protest. Eyewitnesses reported that security forces used live ammunition, wounding several and arresting many more. Emotional protesters, demanding justice, carried banners and pictures of the 2019 victims. The two people who were killed were identified as Othman Badr al-Din and Mudathir Mukhtar.

Five days later, soldiers under investigation for the death of the two protesters were handed over for civilian prosecution. Sovereign Transitional Council chair Abdel Fattah al-Burhane gave the findings of an armed-forces investigation to Attorney General Tagelsir al-Hebr. According to the chief prosecutor's office, seven soldiers were charged by the military for using live ammunition.

On 19 May, Human Rights Watch confirmed that Sudanese armed forces had used unlawful and excessive force against the 11 May protesters. According to HRW, Sudan's Ministry of Health said that two people were killed and thirty-seven others were wounded.

=== June 2021 ===
Outgoing International Criminal Court chief prosecutor Fatou Bensouda called on the Sudanese transitional government on 9 June to hand over three suspects accused of war crimes, including former president Omar al-Bashir, to the court. According to Bensouda, victim messages from Zalingei, El Fasher, and Nyala insisted that the suspects must be transferred to the ICC to answer outstanding warrants; former interior minister and governor Ahmad Harun should be transferred to be tried with Sudanese militia leader Ali Kushayb.

On 10 June, demonstrators took to the streets in Khartoum to protest the government's removal of subsidies on petrol and diesel. The protesters reportedly set tyres ablaze and shut down roads in the capital. According to finance minister Jibril Ibrahim, the hike in prices is due to import costs. Other cities across Sudan were expected to join the protest and make it nationwide. The Sudanese Professionals Association threatened to organize street protests against the decision. The Sudanese government said that it would ensure that the gangs behind the road blockades were prosecuted.

Five days later, Prime Minister Abdalla Hamdok expressed concern that loyalists to the previous government were inciting violence and civil war. Hamdok said that the government would not accommodate saboteurs, and constitutional action would be taken.

=== August 2021 ===
On 5 August, six paramilitary officers were condemned to death by a Sudanese court for killing of six protesters in 2019 in the city of Al-Obeid in North Kordofan. Of the six who were killed, four were believed to be schoolchildren. Two additional defendants were acquitted, and another below age 18 was transferred to juvenile court. There was no immediate information on whether the six officers would appeal their sentences.

=== October 2021 ===
On 16 October, pro-military protesters held a protest in Khartoum demanding a military coup; they were allowed to reach the gates of the presidential palace, with a negligible police presence. The protesters called for Sovereignty Council chair Abdel Fattah al-Burhan to seize control and take over the country. The pro-military protesters continued their sit-in outside the presidential palace in Khartoum until 21 October, when hundreds of thousands of pro-civilian protestors in Khartoum, Omdurman, Port Sudan and Atbara took to the streets in support of the government.

Pro-military protesters blocked major roads and bridges in Khartoum on 24 October, and security forces used tear gas to disperse the crowds. After the October–November 2021 Sudanese coup d'état, the Sudanese Professionals Association and the FFC called for mass civil disobedience and refusal to cooperate with the coup. The National Umma Party denounced the arrest of government ministers, and called on the public to protest in the streets. The Sudanese Communist Party advocated a workers' strike and mass civil disobedience. Demonstrators began gathering in the streets of Khartoum after the arrests, burning car tires and setting up roadblocks. Chants by protestors included "The people are stronger", "Retreat [to military rule] is impossible", and "We are revolutionaries. We are free. We will complete the journey." Most schools, banks and businesses were closed.

According to the Information Ministry, the army used live ammunition to disperse protesters in the 25 October protests. Military forces tried to remove protestors' barricades and attacked civilians. Seven civilians were killed and over 140 were injured during the protests. Security forces made house-to-house arrests of protest organizers. The Socialist Doctors' Association said that the Royal Care hospital, near army headquarters, was in "urgent need of blood". Three hundred protestors were arrested. Protests outside Khartoum included Gezira and Red Sea.

A "Revolutionary Escalation Schedule", a plan for continued protests, was published by the Joint Chamber of the Marches of the Millions for Civilian rule and Democratic Transition. Plans included vigils on highways and in front of government buildings and embassies, nightly marches beginning on 29 October and mass protests on 30 October throughout Sudan, calling for a full transfer of power to civilians.

Protests continued on 26 October, with demonstrators chanting slogans, blocking roads and burning tyres. There was "complete civil disobedience", with schools, shops and petrol stations closed in Geneina. In addition to Khartoum, protests took place in Atbara, Dongola, El Obeid and Port Sudan.

Demonstrations continued on 27 October in Khartoum and Atbara. Most government and educational institutions were in "complete paralysis", and travel between Khartoum and the Sudanese states had largely stopped. Security forces used live ammunition while trying to remove protestors' roadblocks in Khartoum, and demonstrations grew in the evening.

Rallies continued in Atbara, Khartoum, Omdurman, Gezira, Port Sudan and other cities across the country on October 28. That night, more people joined protests in Khartoum and young people protested elsewhere. One demonstrator was killed in a clash on the morning of 29 October by security forces, who tore down barricades in Khartoum; more forces were deployed across the city. Militia forces forced protesters to disperse from barricades in Khartoum, but protesters continued demonstrating the day after a crackdown.

=== November 2021 ===
All political prisoners were freed on 21 November, and Abdalla Hamdok was reinstated as prime minister as part of an agreement with the civilian political parties.

=== December 2021 ===
The Central Committee of Sudanese Doctors said on 31 December that at least four protesters were killed and 200 injured the previous day, when security forces opened fire on protestors in Omdurman.

=== January 2022 ===
On 1 January 2022, the Central Committee of Sudanese Doctors said that the death toll from the 30 December demonstration had risen to six. The committee said that since the Sudanese military overthrew Abdalla Hamdok's transition government and declared a state of emergency on 25 October, 54 protestors had been killed.

Two more protesters were killed on 2 January – one in Khartoum and one in Omdurman – increasing the CCSD's total death toll of protesters since the coup to 56; it later increased to 57. Amid the protests, Hamdok announced his resignation as prime minister.

On Jan 13, one police officer and one demonstrator were killed during protests in Khartoum.

=== May 2022 ===
On May 29 security forces attacked a demonstration in the Al-Kalakla neighbourhood of Khartoum with tear gas and bullets. One protester died on the spot while another died from injuries in the hospital. On May 30, 33 people were wounded in an attempt by police to disperse a protest.

=== June 2022 ===
June 13 Khartoum witnessed a number of demonstrations. The police fired tear gas to disperse the demonstrators. At least 14 injuries were reported in Burri, Khartoum. The anti-coup demonstrations were organised by resistance committees. Marches accompanied by road closures were organised in Khartoum and Wad Madani yesterday to demand the overthrow of the coup and the establishment of civilian rule.

The protesters closed a number of main roads in various parts of Khartoum and held speeches and chants demanding that the killers of demonstrators be brought to justice. At least 103 pro-democracy protesters have been killed in anti-coup demonstrations so far.

The doctors association say in a report that the coup authorities used excessive violence against the demonstrators, which included the use of live bullets, stun grenades, and tear gas in the June 16 marches and processions. The Doctors Association had also said that 136 others wounded, including six live bullet wounds, six run over by vehicles, and 67 people were directly hit by projectiles. The report indicated that 116 injuries were recorded in the Khartoum processions and 20 injuries were recorded in the Omdurman processions. 43 demonstrators were detained in the protests, including five young women and four minors.

At least 13 people were injured during demonstrations in neighbourhoods of Khartoum, Khartoum North (Bahri), Omdurman, and in Wad Madani on Monday. On Tuesday the cities saw new protests of activists and organisations preparing their followers for widespread national mass action across Sudan – and possible closure of Sudan's borders – in the Marches of the Millions of June 30.

People took to the streets in massive processions in Omdurman, Khartoum Bahri, and the South Belt of Khartoum, as well as in Wad Madani, capital of El Gezira state on Wednesday, to demand the overthrow of the ruling military junta, that seized power in military coup in October last year. The Central Committee of Sudan Doctors confirmed that 13 cases of injuries were recorded in the June 21 demonstrations in Khartoum and Khartoum Bahri, including six head injuries from solid objects.

Resistance committees and various political and professional opposition groups continue their preparations for the launch of the June 30 Marches of the Millions, calling for the overthrow of the military rulers of the country. The resistance committees active in the neighbourhoods and villages in the country continue to run parades and vigils to call for mass participation in the intifada Marches of the Millions coming Thursday calling for “full civilian rule”.

== See also ==
- List of protests in the 21st century
- 2023 Sudan clashes
