= Mayo, Khartoum =

Neighbourhood in Khartoum, Sudan

Mayo مايو
- Neighbourhood
- Location in Sudan
- Coordinates: 15°29′0″N 32°33′8″E
- Country: Sudan
- State: Khartoum
- City: Khartoum
- Founded: 1970
- Named for: 25 May Revolution

Area
  - Total: 40 km^{2} (15 sq mi)

Population
  - Estimate (2008): 1 million
- Time zone: Central Africa Time, GMT + 3

Mayo (Arabic: مايو), or Mayo district or Mayo neighbourhood (Arabic: حي مايو), is one of the neighbourhoods of Khartoum, Sudan, located in the southern side of Khartoum.

== History ==
After Jaafar Nimeiry took the power after 25 May 1969 coup d'état, he removed Al-Ashiesh (Arabic: العشش) slum in 1970 and then relocated its residents to Mayo neighbourhood, which was before that a wastewater dump. Nimieiry named the area after the month of his coup.

In an area that is estimated at 40 square kilometres (15 sq mi), Mayo has a high population density according to 2008 censuses. The "Hayy Quro", located in the east of Mayo, is the oldest of the 26 neighbourhood (or "Hayy") that form Mayo. Other neighbourhoods were formerly named after the Sudanese tribes, such as "Hayy al-Arab", "Hayy Masalit", and "Hayy al-Nuba."

The Mayo neighbourhood is characterised by the abundance of markets in it, as it has ten main markets in addition to that each of the Mayo neighbourhoods has a market. Among the most important markets in Mayo is "Bruce Market", "Market 6", and "Quro Market".

=== Refugee camps ===
It has a number of ethnic components with over 200 local dialects, as it has refugee camp sites.

In May 2013, the United Nations expressed concern as Sudanese aid group Al-Manar, which provided food for 528 malnourished children in Khartoum's Mayo and Mandela neighbourhoods and Omdurman women's prison, had to suspend its activities. Security officials in Khartoum State denied access permits to Al-Manar, forcing the suspension of vital projects. The United Nations, through its Office for the Coordination of Humanitarian Affairs (OCHA), sought to understand the reasons behind this closure and advocated for the projects to continue. Sudanese authorities often viewed NGOs with suspicion, accusing them of collaborating with opposition groups or international courts, reflecting the complex relationship between Sudan and humanitarian organizations.

=== Crime activities ===
In August 2020, a video of Sudanese artist Aisha Al-Jabal being harassed by a group of men at a party at an event in Mayo went viral, sparking outrage on social media. Activists launched a solidarity campaign called "We all Aisha al-Jabal" to support the artist and demand legislation against harassment. However, some blamed Aisha's clothing for the harassment.

In December 2022, Mayo district witnessed violent incidents and shootings, when a police patrol clashed with an armed robbery gang.

=== 2023 Sudan conflict ===
During the Battle of Khartoum in the 2023 Sudan conflict, on 31 May the Sudanese Doctors' Union said that at least 18 people were killed and more than 100 others were wounded after six tank shells hit Market 6 in Mayo. The shelling reportedly came from as a result of tank battles near al-Shajara neighborhood. The dead and injured were taken to Bashaer Governmental Teaching Hospital, one of few left open in the city. The toll later rose to 18 killed, with doctors claiming it could go higher due to lack of medical services.

On 17 June, Seventeen people, including five children, were killed in an SAF air strike around the RSF-controlled Yarmouk munitions factory in Khartoum. The RSF also claimed that the SAF launched attacks in the neighbourhoods of Mayo and Mandela.
