= UrduPoint =

Pakistani web portal

UrduPoint.com
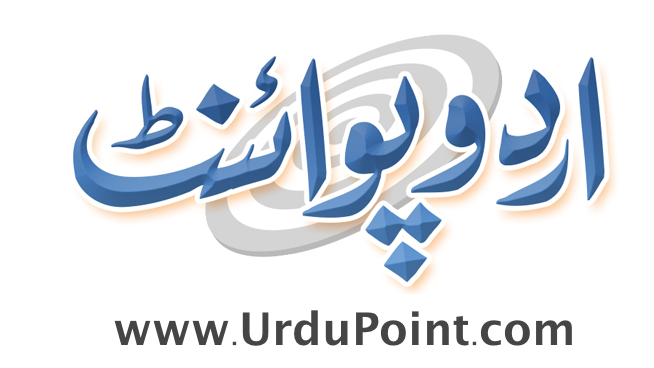
- Website type: Web portal
- Available in: 3 languages
- List of languages Urdu, English, Arabic
- Country of origin: Pakistan
- Owner: Ali Chaudhry
- Revenue: Advertisement
- Website: www.urdupoint.com
- Commercial: NO
- Registration: Not required
- Launched: 14 August 2000
- Current status: Online

UrduPoint is an Urdu-language web portal in Pakistan, launched on 14 August 2000. As of April 2016, it ranked as the 6th most visited website in Pakistan and held a global rank of 1045 (April 2016).

UrduPoint has partnered with digital media company Ziff Davis, a division of J2 Global, to introduce Mashable Pakistan, offering content in both Urdu and English.

Additionally, UrduPoint is available for free through Internet.org (now freebasics.com), a service initiated by Facebook in Pakistan.

In 2019, UrduPoint became the official digital media partner of the Multan Sultans for the fourth season of the Pakistan Super League. In 2020, UrduPoint's YouTube channel boasted over 8 million active subscribers.
