= Wad Ajeeb =

Neighbourhood in Sudan

Wad Ajeeb ود عجيب
- Neighbourhood
- Location in Sudan
- Coordinates: 15°31′2″N 32°29′0.4″E
- Country: Sudan
- State: Khartoum
- City: Khartoum
- Time zone: Central Africa Time, GMT + 3

Wad Ajeeb (Arabic: ود عجيب) is a neighbourhood located in the southern part of Khartoum, the capital of Sudan. The region has been affected by the ongoing conflict in Sudan with reports that the Rapid Support Forces (RSF) used drones to attack civilians, killing at least 14 civilians were killed and another 15 injured following an alleged drone strike in Wad Ajeeb. The civilians had reportedly gathered to welcome the Sudanese Armed Forces (SAF) soldiers entering the area.
