= 2013 Nyala clashes =

Tribal clashes in Sudan, 2013

- Part of aftermath of the War in Darfur
Date	2–4 May 2013
Location	Nyala, South Darfur, Sudan
Result	Unclear: Several neighborhoods torched

Belligerents
Fur militiamen	Tarjam militiamen

Casualties and losses
- 28+ people killed, over 10,000 Displaced

On 2 May 2013 clashes between the Fur and Tarjam tribes broke out near Nyala, Sudan. The clashes lead to the death of at least 28 people and displaced around 10,000 people.

== Background ==
El-Salam refugee camp near Nyala was established in 2005 to account for the massive influx of internally displaced persons (IDP) caused by the war in Darfur which began in 2003. In 2013 the population of El-Salam camp was around 85,000 thousand people and growing because of the ongoing war.

== Clashes ==
The clashes began on 2 May 2013 after an apparent dispute in a village market in El-Salam locality, between Arab Tarjam and non-Arab Fur tribesmen. The first clashes killed around eight people and injured four. The next day the clashes killed an additional 8 people and militants attacked the surrounding areas, torching several villages in the process. On 4 May police conducted a search party which searched for the alleged perpetrators of the clashes. The search party arrested one of the alleged perpetrators and killed two others. After this militants returned to the area in camels, horses and cars and ambushed the search group. The ambush left around 12 people dead. The clashes displaced around 10,000 thousand people most of whom fled to Nyala and surrounding cities.
