= Al-Azuzab =

Neighbourhood in Sudan

Al-Azuzab العزوزاب
- Neighbourhood
- Location in Sudan
- Coordinates: 15°30′53.49″N 32°29′22″E
- Country: Sudan
- State: Khartoum
- City: Khartoum
- Time zone: Central Africa Time, GMT + 3

Al-Azuzab (Arabic: العزوزاب) is one of the neighbourhoods of Khartoum, the capital of Sudan. The region has been affected by the ongoing conflict in Sudan with reports that the Rapid Support Forces (RSF) used drones to attack civilians who had gathered to support the Sudanese Armed Forces (SAF) in Al-Azuzab. This attack resulted in the death of 14 people. The overall situation in Sudan is complex and volatile, with more than 3.5 million people displaced due to the conflict.
