= Jabal Awliya =

Village in north-central Sudan

Jabal Awliya جبل أولياء
- Location in Sudan and Africa Jabal Awliya (Africa)
- Coordinates: 15°14′28″N 32°30′25″E
- Country: Sudan
- State: Khartoum
- Time zone: UTC+02:00 (CAT)

Jabal Awliya (Arabic: جبل أولياء, Jabal al Awliyā', Jebel Aulia, Gebel Aulia) is a village in the north-central part of Sudan, about 40 km (25 mi) south of Khartoum. Nearby is the Jebel Aulia Dam, built in 1937 by the British for the Egyptian government. Jabal Awliya became a refuge camp during the Second Sudanese Civil War, housing more than 100,000 inhabitants.

== Jabal Awliya Airport ==
Jabal Awliya Airport
- IATA: none; ICAO: none

Summary
- Airport type: Public / Military
- Serves: Jabal Awliya
- Elevation AMSL: 2,182 ft (665 m)

Map
- Location of the airport in Sudan

Helipads
Number	Length		Surface
Number	ft	m	Surface
18/36H	986	300	Asphalt

The airport hosts Sudanese Air Force along with Sudanese Army and police.

The airport hosts three helicopter squadrons (Mil Mi-8, Mil Mi-17, Mil Mi-24, Mil Mi-35) from the base. There is a short runway but only used as helipad with markings found midway.

On 26 February 1996, a C-130 transport plane of the Sudanese military crashed at Jabal Awliya, killing all 91 people on board.
