= Al-Ashra =

Neighbourhood in Sudan

Al-Ashra العشرة
- Neighbourhood
- Location in Sudan
- Coordinates: 15°32′43.8″N 32°31′50.5″E
- Country: Sudan
- State: Khartoum
- City: Khartoum
- Time zone: Central Africa Time, GMT + 3

Al-Ashra (Arabic: العشرة), or Al-Aushara or Al Oshara, is one of the neighbourhoods of Khartoum, the capital of Sudan. The region has been affected by the ongoing conflict in Sudan, with reports that the Rapid Support Forces (RSF) ordered residents of Al-Ashra neighborhood in Khartoum’s Al Sahafah district to leave their homes after they refused to cooperate with the RSF.
