= Sudan Doctors Union =

Doctors syndicate in Sudan

Sudan Doctors Union logo

The Sudan Doctors Union (SDU) (Arabic: نقابة أطباء السودان), also sometimes referred to as Sudan Doctors Syndicate, Sudan Doctors' Trade Union or Sudanese Doctors Association, is a professional association of Sudanese doctors. It has been actively involved in addressing the challenges faced by the healthcare sector in Sudan. The SDU documents the fatalities and injuries during the Sudanese conflicts, and their members have been subjected to shootings, torture, and abductions by the government and armed forces in Sudan.

== History ==
It is probable that the SDU became a recognised union following the revolution in October 1964 and the reestablishment of the Sudan Trade Union Law in 1966.

Through its history, the SDU has called for international support due to the collapse of the public health sector and the lack of public services provision in public facilities. The SDU has highlighted that doctors have borne the brunt of a collapsed health system and have gone into several general strikes demanding improvement of the health system and doctors’ working conditions in Sudan. The SDU has also been involved in providing medical and financial aid to wounded protesters during periods of civil unrest. However, this has led to some members of the SDU being detained.

During the Sudanese revolution of 2019, the Central Committee of Sudan Doctors (CCSD) was one of the trade unions that formed the Sudanese Professionals Association (SPA) which had a prominent role in the protests.

In the midst of the 2023 conflict in Sudan, influential social media users who were in favor of the Sudanese Armed Forces launched an assault on the Sudanese Doctors Union. They wrongfully alleged that the SDU was biased towards the Rapid Support Forces and the Janjaweed. These unfounded claims posed a threat to both the standing and security of the healthcare workers. Despite these challenges, the SDS continues to advocate for improvements in the healthcare sector and the working conditions of doctors in Sudan.

The SDU established global branches to support Sudanese doctors living abroad. These include a branch in the United Kingdom set up in the mid-1970s, one in the USA, another in Ireland founded in 2010, and a Canadian branch that was established on 24 February 2019. The SDU in Qatar, which opened a helpline within two days of the start of the war in Sudan (2023), is staffed by 136 doctors from more than 36 specialties.
