= Jabra, Khartoum =

Neighbourhood in Sudan

Jabra جبرة
- Neighbourhood
- Location in Sudan
- Coordinates: 15°31′37.11″N 32°30′52.97″E
- Country: Sudan
- State: Khartoum
- City: Khartoum
- Time zone: Central Africa Time, GMT + 3

Jabra (Arabic: جبرة), or Gabra, is one of the neighbourhoods of Khartoum, Sudan, located in the southern side of Khartoum.

== History ==
On 2 July 2015, a significant number of women in Khartoum took action by blocking Jabra's main street, which connected the southern and eastern neighbourhoods of the city. They were protesting the continuous disruption of drinking water supply to their homes, which had been ongoing for five consecutive days. During the protest, the women voiced their grievances against the government and demanded immediate water provision. Witnesses reported that the demonstrators used concrete blocks to obstruct the main street, causing an hour-long disruption in traffic. Subsequently, the police intervened and dispersed the women's demonstrations.

On 28 December 2021, a raid conducted by Sudanese intelligence officers on an ISIS cell in the Jabra neighbourhood, resulted in the death of five officers and the injury of one. The security operation also led to the arrest of 11 terrorists of various nationalities. During the raid, the terrorist group opened fire on the security forces, resulting in casualties among the officers. Four foreign terrorists managed to escape and are currently being pursued. This marks the first time that Sudanese authorities have announced the seizure of an ISIS cell in the country. Prime Minister Abdalla Hamdok praised the fallen officers as heroes who were combating extremist terrorist activities to secure and stabilize the country.

=== 2023 Sudan conflict ===
Jabra neighbourhood, which includes one of the headquarters of the Rapid Support Forces (RSF) and Hemedti's house, is located near the al-Shajara area, where the headquarters of the armoured corps of the army is located.

During the 2023 Sudan conflict, on 18 May, the Sudanese Armed Forces (SAF) shelled and destructed Hemedti's house in Jabra using drones. On 30 June, hundreds of residents in Jabra neighbourhood were forced to leave their homes and flee due to the intensification of fighting between the SAF and the RSF. According to witnesses, the RSF knocked on doors in the area and asked the remaining residence to leave the area within 24 hours.
