= Al-Shajara, Khartoum =

Neighbourhood in Sudan

Al Shagara الشجرة
- Neighbourhood
- Location in Sudan
- Coordinates: 15°32′14″N 32°29′38″E
- Country: Sudan
- State: Khartoum
- City: Khartoum
- Time zone: Central Africa Time, GMT + 3

Al-Shajara (Arabic: الشجرة) is a neighbourhood located in West Khartoum, the capital city of Sudan. It is situated near Jabra neighbourhood, which includes one of the headquarters of the Rapid Support Forces (RSF) and Hemedti's house. The headquarters of the Armoured Corps of the Sudanese Armed Forces (SAF) is located in Al-Shajara.

On 31 July, during the 2023 Sudan conflict, The SAF Special Task Forces attacked an RSF-held Yarmouk Military Industrial Complex near Al-Shajara and claimed to have killed 15 paramilitaries. The SAF also claimed that 23 RSF officers had defected to their side in the July.
