= Timeline of the Sudanese civil war (2024) =

The following is a timeline of the Sudanese civil war (2023–present) in 2024.

This timeline is a dynamic and fluid list, and as such may never satisfy criteria of completeness. Moreover, some events may only be fully understood and/or discovered in retrospect.

== January 2024 ==
=== 1 January ===
Hemedti met with a delegation of the Civil Democratic Forces alliance (Tagadum) led by former Prime Minister Abdallah Hamdok in Addis Ababa, during which he agreed to release 451 captives held by the RSF, ensure humanitarian access and protection of civilians, and commit to a ceasefire through direct negotiations with the SAF.

The leader of the Nasserist Party, Sattea al-Haj, was arrested by Sudanese military intelligence in what was seen as a crackdown by the SAF on anti-war figures.

The governor of North Darfur, Abdel Rahman Nimr, was dismissed from his position by SAF chief Abdel Fattah al-Burhan. Nimr subsequently claimed that his removal was due to his neutral stance on the war and his refusal to declare a mobilization campaign in support of the SAF.

=== 2 January ===
The RSF attacked the town of Bara, North Kordofan and plundered the University of Gezira in Wad Madani. The SAF launched airstrikes on RSF positions in Wad Madani, Sennar, and the Khartoum area.

=== 3 January ===
The SPLM–N (al-Hilu) retook most of Habila from the RSF.

Hemedti met with Kenyan President William Ruto in Nairobi.

=== 4 January ===
Hemedti met with South African President Cyril Ramaphosa in Pretoria.

The Sudanese government recalled its ambassador to Kenya, Kamal Jubbara in protest over Hemedti's reception by the Kenyan government.

=== 5 January ===
Eleven people were killed in SAF airstrikes in Wad Madani.

Burhan rejected an agreement brokered by IGAD for him to meet with Hemedti as well as the ceasefire agreement signed by the latter in Addis Ababa.

Hemedti met with Rwandan President Paul Kagame in Kigali.

=== 7 January ===
The SPLM–N (al-Hilu) seized control of Dalang following reports of an agreement between the group and the SAF to fight the RSF.

=== 8 January ===
The SPLM–N (al-Hilu) together with the SAF clashed with the RSF in the Nuba Mountains, while the SAF launched airstrikes on an RSF camp in Dibebad.

The SAF accused the RSF of setting fire to the Sahil and Sahara Bank Tower, a prominent landmark in Khartoum.

River Nile governor Mohamed al-Badawi issued an order banning the FFC as well as resistance and administrative committees in the state and replacing them with steering committees.

=== 9 January ===
The SAF launched an offensive to link its forces in the Karari and Mohandiseen neighborhoods of Omdurman.

Forty-seven wild animals that had been moved to Gezira State from a wildlife sanctuary in Khartoum due to the fighting were evacuated to Jordan.

=== 10 January ===
The SAF and the SPLM–N (al-Hilu) repelled an RSF attack on Dalang, destroying five vehicles and capturing 21 others.

Two people were killed by an SAF airstrike in Nyala.

The UN announced that over 7.5 million people in Sudan had been displaced by the war.

=== 11 January ===
At least 23 people were killed by SAF airstrikes in the Soba district of Khartoum, while ten others were killed by shelling in the south of the capital.

The Nyala Mosque was damaged during an SAF airstrike that also struck a museum.

=== 12 January ===
Hemedti held a phone call with UN Secretary-General António Guterres, which was criticized by the Sudanese government.

=== 13 January ===
The SAF attacked RSF positions in El Buweida, Gezira State, and in El Faw, Al Qadarif State.

Burhan rejected an invitation by IGAD to attend a summit in Uganda to be also attended by Hemedti on 18 January.

The governor of Northern State, Abdeen Awadallah, ordered the dissolution of FFC committees and other grassroots organizations in the state.

=== 14 January ===
The SAF launched airstrikes against an RSF garrison in White Nile State and regained control over the Al-Umda and Al-Abbasiya neighbourhoods of Omdurman. Seven people were killed by airstrikes in El Geteina.

The SAF launched airstrikes in the ancient Meroitic sites of Naqa and Musawwarat es-Sufra, which are both designated UNESCO World Heritage Sites, following incursions there by the RSF.

=== 16 January ===
The Sudanese government formally suspended ties with IGAD in retaliation for its invitation to Hemedti to attend its 18 January summit in Uganda, calling it a "violation of Sudan's sovereignty". It also banned all grassroots committees that had been set up across the country following the Sudanese Revolution in 2019, citing the ongoing political situation.

=== 17 January ===
Twelve people were killed in an SAF airstrike in El Zurug, North Darfur. A doctor in Omdurman was killed at a checkpoint by the SAF after he was accused of being an RSF intelligence officer.

Tagadum announced that it would attend the IGAD Summit in Uganda on 18 January that was also to be attended by Hemedti.

The African Union Commission announced the creation of a High-Level Panel on Sudan chaired by AU High Representative for Silencing the Guns Mohamed Ibn Chambas and composed of former Ugandan vice president Specioza Kazibwe and former AU envoy to Somalia Francisco Madeira, to help facilitate peace efforts in the country.

=== 18 January ===
Hemedti met with leaders of IGAD member states at the IGAD summit in Kampala.

=== 20 January ===
The Sudanese government suspended the country's membership in IGAD in retaliation for Hemedti's attendance at its summit in Uganda.

=== 21 January ===
Eleven people were killed in SAF airstrikes on the village of Abu Khaboub village, west of Muglad. Four people were killed in a missile attack near a volunteer kitchen in the Shambat neighborhood of Khartoum Bahri.

=== 22 January ===
Five people were killed in clashes between the SAF and the RSF in Donki El Omda, west of Babanusa. Eight others were killed in SAF airstrikes in villages west of Muglad.

Residents reported that the RSF had laid siege to the village of Wad Kebeish, north of El Geteina.

SLM–Nur leader Abdul Wahid al-Nur met with Hemedti in Kenya as part of efforts to alleviate the humanitarian situation in SLM-controlled areas.

The European Council imposed sanctions on six firms for "supporting activities undermining the stability and political transition of Sudan". Among those sanctioned were two companies involved in manufacturing weapons and vehicles for the SAF.

=== 23 January ===
Hemedti revealed that he had held a telephone conversation with UN humanitarian aid chief Martin Griffiths and discussed the delivery of relief aid to Sudan.

=== 24 January ===
The RSF launched an offensive to seize Babanusa and the garrison of the SAF's 22nd Infantry Division in the city. At least 23 people were reported to have been killed while 30 others were injured.

One person was killed in clashes between the SAF and the RSF in the Abu Shouk IDP camp.

=== 25 January ===
The SAF launched airstrikes on Ed Daein for the first time since it fell to the RSF.

=== 26 January ===
Sudan War Monitor reported that the RSF had taken over most of Babanusa and indicated that its fighters had penetrated the headquarters of the SAF's 22nd Infantry Division.

=== 27 January ===
The SAF launched a morning offensive that seized the RSF garrison in the Kadru neighborhood of Khartoum Bahri and the Al-Jawafa bridge connecting Kadru and the El-Jeili oil refinery. SAF paratroopers were also deployed for the first time since the start of the conflict in Khartoum Bahri.

=== 28 January ===
The RSF claimed to have shot down an Iranian-made Qods Mohajer-6 drone over Omdurman. The SAF claimed to have destroyed an RSF base in the El Kadaro neighborhood of Khartoum Bahri.

=== 29 January ===
SAF deputy commander Yasser al-Atta claimed that the SAF had formed an alliance with the SPLM–N (al-Hilu), which the latter denied.

Clashes broke out between the SLM-T and the SLM-MM east of Gedaref, forcing the state government to expel the units involved.

=== 30 January ===
Burhan ordered the SAF to launch a full-scale offensive against the RSF.

=== 31 January ===
The US imposed sanctions on two firms linked to the RSF and its gold export business and a third for helping to finance an SAF-run weapons company that had already been sanctioned by Washington.

A temporary ceasefire was declared in Babanusa to allow the evacuation of civilians following mediation by the Misseriya paramount chief, Mukhtar Babu Nimr, and other tribal leaders.

== February 2024 ==
=== 3 February ===
A massive internet outage affected 65% of Sudan's population, with responsibility being attributed to either the SAF, the RSF, or Bashir loyalists.

=== 5 February ===
The hacking group Anonymous Sudan claimed to have disabled all internet services in Djibouti as part of a cyberattack to protest the country's relations with the RSF.

=== 6 February ===
A coup attempt was allegedly staged by SAF officers in Wadi Seidna, which the SAF leadership denied.

=== 9 February ===
The SPLM–N (al-Hilu) seized control of Habila from the RSF. At least 24 people were killed in RSF raids on villages near the town.

=== 16 February ===
The SAF said it had broken the RSF's siege on its Corps of Engineers headquarters in Omdurman after units from the north of the city linked up with forces from the garrison at the Al-Thawra neighborhood.

The SAF ordered an investigation after video emerged on social media of its soldiers showing off the heads of two suspected RSF members.

=== 17 February ===
JEM troops arrived in the Wadi Seidna military base in Omdurman for the first time, along with other movements, and met with army leaders such as Yasser El-Atta.

Burhan met with the 3rd Infantry Division in Shendi, and vowed to continue the ongoing conflict between the RSF until they are "completely defeated."

The RSF carried out arrests among civilians in Kreinik, West Darfur, mostly targeting young people and activists on charges of transmitting reports of RSF violations in the region.

=== 20 February ===
At least ten people, including all six members of one family, were killed in an SAF airstrike in Ed Daein.

=== 21 February ===
Four people were killed in a drone attack on a market in Khartoum Bahri.

=== 22 February ===
Fourteen people were killed in an attack on a merchant convoy near Tortahan, East Darfur.

Seven people were killed by shelling in the Al-Nahda neighborhood of Khartoum.

=== 24 February ===
Dozens were killed and 15 women were abducted in an RSF attack on Habila that also displaced 40,000 residents.

=== 25 February ===
The SAF said it had encircled RSF positions at Sudan TV headquarters in Omdurman.

=== 26 February ===
The SAF regained control of the Abrof neighborhood of Omdurman from the RSF.

=== 28 February ===
The RSF was accused of killing 16 people in an attack on the village of Sherif Mukhtar, Gezira State.

=== 29 February ===
UNITAMS completed its withdrawal from Sudan.

== March 2024 ==
Map of the Sudanese Civil War in March 2024

=== 4 March ===
At least two civilians were killed and four others injured in SAF airstrikes in Muglad.

=== 5 March ===
The RSF claimed to have taken control of El Medina Arab, Gezira State, and were advancing towards El Managil.

=== 7 March ===
Five people were killed in an RSF raid on the village of El Doudiya, West Kordofan. Four paramilitaries were subsequently killed after being pursued by armed residents into Um Samima, North Kordofan.

=== 12 March ===
The SAF claimed to have retaken control of the headquarters of the Sudan National Broadcasting Corporation in Omdurman from the RSF.

=== 14 March ===
The SAF claimed to have retaken the Wad al-Bashir Bridge connecting the old center of Omdurman and the Ombadda neighborhood. It also announced the capture of 14 South Sudanese accused of fighting for the RSF in Omdurman.

Fourteen people, including 11 children and two teachers, were killed in an SAF airstrike on a school in El Hadra, South Kordofan.

=== 15 March ===
Eight people were killed in an RSF raid on the village of Umm Jaris, Gezira State.

=== 16 March ===
The SAF claimed to have repelled an assault by the RSF on the Signal Corps headquarters in Khartoum Bahri.

=== 20 March ===
The shrine of the Sufi leader Sheikh Hassan Al-Fatih Qaribullah in the Wad Nubawi neighborhood of Omdurman was damaged in an attack, with the SAF and the RSF trading blame.

=== 22 March ===
Three people were killed in an SAF airstrike in Shuaa, West Kordofan.

Five people were killed in RSF raids on El Hasaheisa and Rufaa, Gezira State.

=== 24 March ===
The SLM-MM formally announced that it would fight the RSF.

=== 25 March ===
Nine people were killed by SAF airstrikes in El Fasher.

=== 26 March ===
The SAF claimed to have retaken control of the Doha neighbourhood of Omdurman from the RSF.

=== 27 March ===
The SAF launched airstrikes on an RSF convoy near Mellit, North Darfur.

The RSF claimed to have regained control of the Wad al-Bashir Bridge in Omdurman.

=== 28 March ===
Eight people were killed in an RSF raid on the village of Al-Takla Jabara, Gezira State.

=== 29 March ===
The RSF attacked an SLM–Nur convoy near El Fasher, inflicting several casualties, destroying four vehicles and capturing five SLM personnel, including the convoy's commander, whom they later released.

== April 2024 ==
=== 1 April ===
The first batch of humanitarian assistance from the World Food Programme arrived in South Darfur.

Musa Hilal, a former Janjaweed leader responsible for the 2003 Darfur genocide, and currently the head of the Sudanese Awakening Revolutionary Council (SARC) and a critic of the RSF, survived an assassination attempt in Umm Sant, North Darfur. His son hinted the attackers to be affiliated with the RSF.

=== 2 April ===
Twelve people were killed and 30 others were injured after a drone attack in Atbara that struck an iftar gathering organised by the Al-Baraa Islamic militia that is allied with the SAF.

=== 3 April ===
The SAF launched airstrikes on the RSF-controlled 16th Infantry Division Command and several neighborhoods in Nyala.

Sudanese prosecutors filed capital offence charges of incitement to war against the state, undermining the constitutional order, and crimes against humanity against Abdallah Hamdok and 15 other Tagadum members.

=== 4 April ===
The SAF claimed to have retaken the villages of Wad Faqisha and Hafira in Gezira State from the RSF without resistance.

The RSF attacked six villages inhabited by the Zaghawa people in North Darfur, killing at least 15 people.

=== 5 April ===
The SAF launched a major offensive to push out the RSF from Gezira State.

=== 7 April ===
The SAF claimed to have retaken the town of Al-Qalaa Al-Bayda, 30 kilometers east of Wad Madani, from the RSF. It also claimed to have entered Medina Arab, 15 kilometers west of Wad Madani.

=== 8 April ===
Over 100 people were killed in attacks by the RSF on SPLM–N (al-Hilu) controlled villages in South Kordofan.

=== 9 April ===
The headquarters of the SAF's Security and Intelligence Services in Al Faw, Gedaref State, was struck by two drones, injuring three people. A third drone was shot down.

=== 11 April ===
Thirteen people were killed by suspected RSF shelling in the Hab Al-Naseem neighbourhood of Al-Jarif, Khartoum.

Nine civilians were reportedly killed by SAF intelligence services after being accused of collaborating with rebels in Kuek, South Kordofan.

=== 13 April ===
Fighting broke out in El Fasher between the SLM-TC and another breakaway faction of the SLM led by Salah Rasas that supported the SAF, leaving several dead.

The RSF attacked 16 villages west of El Fasher, killing at least 10 people and injuring 28 others.

=== 14 April ===
The RSF seized control of Mellit in North Darfur, near the Libyan border, cementing its hold over areas north of El Fasher.

Nine people were killed while 39 others were injured in SAF airstrikes and RSF shelling in El Fasher.

=== 16 April ===
Seven people were killed and 45 others were injured in clashes between the SAF and the RSF near El Fasher.

Tagadum leader and former prime minister Abdalla Hamdok met with French President Emmanuel Macron in Paris.

=== 18 April ===
Burhan ordered the dismissal of foreign minister Ali Al-Sadiq Ali as well as governors Mohamed Mousa and Mohamed Abdelrahman of Kassala and Gedaref States.

Shelling in El Obeid killed one person. Two people were killed by SAF raids on RSF targets in Wad Madani. The RSF raided an SAF garrison in Er Rahad, North Kordofan.

=== 22 April ===
SARC leader Musa Hilal announced his support for the SAF.

=== 23 April ===
The SAF claimed to have thwarted an attack on the command centre of its 3rd Infantry Division in Shendi, which occurred shortly following a visit by Burhan, shooting down two drones and "neutralizing" a third, while a fourth one changed its direction.

=== 25 April ===
The SAF claimed to have repelled three RSF drones doing reconnaissance near Oum Bakul, 70 kilometers south of Merowe.

Seven herders and at least 257 camels were killed in an SAF airstrike near Mellit.

=== 27 April ===
The SAF claimed to have shot down three drones targeting Merowe Airport.

=== 30 April ===
Chadian forces attacked the RSF-held border town of Um Dukhun in Central Darfur.

== May 2024 ==
=== 1 May ===
The Darfur Joint Protection Force accused the SAF of killing two of its personnel in El Fasher.

=== 2 May ===
Two drivers were killed in an attack on a Red Cross convoy in South Darfur.

=== 7 May ===
The SAF claimed to have retaken the Jabal al-Ain military base and the nearby village of Abu al-Ghar, 20 kilometers east of El-Obeid, from the RSF, as well as the headquarters of the Police Central Reserve Forces in the city. Both the SAF and the RSF also claimed control of Mount Kordofan, 20 kilometers east of El-Obeid.

=== 10 May ===
Thirteen people were killed in an RSF attack on the village of El Harga Noureldin in Gezira State.

=== 12 May ===
At least 27 people were killed following two days of clashes between the SAF and the RSF in El Fasher. Fifteen people were killed in an RSF attack on the Abu Haraz market in El Obeid.

The SAF shelled the Republican Palace complex in Khartoum, setting fire to parts of the old building. It also claimed to have shot down two drones targeting Wad Zayed Airport in Gedaref State.

=== 15 May ===
The US imposed sanctions on the RSF's head of operations Osman Mohamed Hamid Mohamed and its commander in Central Darfur Ali Yagoub Gibril for their role in the fighting in North Darfur.

=== 17 May ===
A police officer was injured in a drone strike on the port of Kosti.

=== 18 May ===
Eleven people were killed by RSF shelling in Omdurman.

=== 19 May ===
The RSF claimed to have taken Um Rawaba, North Kordofan, for a second time.

Nine people were injured after the RSF shelled the Women's, Maternity, and Neonatal Hospital in El Fasher.

=== 21 May ===
At least 18 people were killed following two days of attacks by the RSF in Takina, Gezira State.

The SAF launched airstrikes on the El Jeili oil refinery.

=== 22 May ===
At least 16 people, including 12 children, were killed in SAF airstrikes in Kabkabiya, North Darfur.

=== 24 May ===
At least 22 people were killed in clashes between the RSF and the SAF in El Fasher.

=== 26 May ===
The RSF took control of the Golo water reservoir west of El Fasher.

=== 27 May ===
The SAF and allied militias retook control of the Golo water reservoir from the RSF.

=== 28 May ===
SAF warplanes bombed the hospital of Kutum, North Darfur, leaving an unknown number of dead and injured.

=== 29 May ===
Burhan had a phone call with United States Secretary of State Antony Blinken, who requested the resumption of negotiations with the RSF in Jeddah. However, the Sudanese government declined, citing the lack of prior consultation and the need for established peace foundations.

=== 31 May ===
The SAF overran RSF positions on the eastern side of the Halfiya Bridge connecting Omdurman and Khartoum Bahri and claimed to have made advances in the latter city before withdrawing, adding that it had sustained seven soldiers killed and 28 injured. The RSF claimed to have shot down an SAF helicopter over Khartoum Bahri.

== June 2024 ==
=== 1 June ===
Eleven people were killed in clashes between the SAF and the RSF in El Fasher, during which the latter claimed to have taken control over the Al-Wahda neighbourhood.

=== 2 June ===
Twelve people were killed by RSF shelling in El Fasher.

=== 4 June ===
At least 85 civilians were killed and over 110 injured in clashes between the SAF and RSF in El Fasher. RSF fighters briefly entered the Al-Wohda and Al-Salam neighbourhoods west of El Fasher before being repelled by SAF forces.

The RSF was accused of executing nine civilians who were taken from a vehicle carrying refugees from El Fasher to Mellit.

=== 5 June ===
The RSF indiscriminately killed between 150 and 200 civilians after besieging the village of Wad Al-Noora in Gezira State with over 35 vehicles and attacking it twice with heavy artillery and gunfire. RSF fighters also entered and looted the Al-Ashra district.

=== 6 June ===
At least 40 people were killed and 50 were injured by RSF shelling on Omdurman, according to the Karari Resistance Committee.

=== 7 June ===
The SAF claimed to have shot down four drones over White Nile State and two others over Wadi Seidna air base.

=== 8 June ===
The RSF attacked the El Fasher South Hospital, the only operational facility in the city handling mass casualties, killing and injuring several patients and staff before withdrawing following clashes with the SAF and allied militias.

=== 9 June ===
The SAF claimed to have broken the RSF siege on the 22nd Infantry Division garrison in Babanusa, in addition to retaking the Al-Salam, Al-Posta, and Al-Sikka neighbourhoods as well as the city's markets.

=== 11 June ===
Eight volunteers were killed by RSF shelling of a charity kitchen in the Tambasi neighbourhood of El Fasher.

=== 13 June ===
The United Nations Security Council voted 14–0 in favor of a UK-drafted resolution calling for an end to the RSF's siege of El Fasher, with Russia abstaining.

=== 14 June ===
The SAF claimed to have repelled an RSF assault on El Fasher, inflicting hundreds of casualties and killing RSF commander Ali Yaqoub Gibril.

=== 18 June ===
Fourteen people were killed and 25 others injured by RSF shelling of the Abu Shouk IDP camp in El Fasher. Four people were killed by SAF airstrikes in Kutum.

=== 19 June ===
Three people were killed by RSF shelling of the Al-Nao hospital in Karari, Omdurman.

=== 20 June ===
The RSF captured the West Kordofan capital of Al-Fulah after a few hours of fighting that displaced civilians and forced the SAF to retreat to Babanusa.

Authorities in Gedaref State announced the arrest of six Ethiopian women on suspicion of working as snipers for the RSF.

=== 21 June ===
One person was killed by RSF shelling of the El Fasher Hospital for Obstetrics and Gynecology.

=== 22 June ===
The RSF accused the SAF of setting the Bahri thermal station in Khartoum Bahri on fire following a bombing.

Clashes broke out in Balanja, Libya between the units of the SLM-MM and forces loyal to General Mohamed Bakhit Ajab Al-Dor, a pro-RSF defector from the Revolutionary Awakening Council.

=== 23 June ===
The European Union imposed sanctions on six entities for manufacturing and procuring weapons for the SAF and the RSF.

=== 24 June ===
The SAF claimed to have retaken control of the Sennar Sugar Factory and the Jabal Moya area in Sennar State from the RSF.

=== 25 June ===
Five people were killed by RSF shelling on the Abu Shouk IDP camp.

=== 28 June ===
Sudan recalled its ambassador to Chad, Osman Mohamed Younis, amid accusations of the latter country supporting the RSF.

=== 29 June ===
The RSF advanced into Sennar State, capturing the Jebel Moya area and its capital Singa, including the headquarters of the SAF's 17th Infantry Division and the police garrison.

=== 30 June ===
The SAF launched airstrikes on Singa.

The SAF accused the RSF of blowing up the eastern side of the Halfaya Bridge connecting Khartoum Bahri and Omdurman.

== July 2024 ==
=== 1 July ===
Nine people were killed by RSF shelling of the El Tijaniya mosque in El Fasher.

=== 2 July ===
In a massive advance, the RSF captured large swaths of territory and the settlements of Mazmoum, Wad an-Nail, Suki and Dinder, and were advancing towards the border of South Sudan.

The SAF recaptured the Doha neighbourhood and its surroundings in Omdurman from the RSF.

=== 3 July ===
Fifteen people were killed by RSF shelling of the livestock market of El Fasher.

=== 4 July ===
The SAF recaptured Dinder from the RSF.

=== 5 July ===
The RSF captured Al-Meiram, West Kordofan, which hosted the garrison of the SAF's 92nd Brigade, prompting the latter's units to flee to South Sudan.

=== 6 July ===
The RSF recaptured Dinder from the SAF and attacked the Doba bridge.

=== 9 July ===
The RSF was accused of destroying the College of Veterinary Medicine of the University of Sennar in Dinder.

=== 10 July ===
Youssif Ibrahim Ezzat was removed by Hemedti as his political adviser, with Ezzat citing "internal restructuring" within the RSF.

=== 11 July ===
Two people were injured in a drone attack on the headquarters of the Gedaref state government in Gedaref city.

The El Baraa Bin Malik Brigade, an Islamist group allied with the SAF, reported that Hudheifa Adam, the commander of its southern sector covering Sennar and Blue Nile States, was killed in action in Mairuno, south of Sennar city, along with Gusay Bushra, its commander in Sennar state.

The government of Khartoum State ordered all foreign nationals to leave its territory within two weeks, citing safety reasons.

=== 12 July ===
The SAF shot down four RSF drones targeting Kosti, Rabak and Kenana in White Nile state.

=== 13 July ===
Twenty-three people were killed in an RSF attack on a merchants' convoy travelling from Fanquqa to Um Sumaima in North Kordofan.

=== 15 July ===
The SAF launched an assault on RSF positions in Jabal Saqdi and the Jabal Moya area.

=== 16 July ===
The Sudanese Public Prosecution, via the Embassy in Uganda, declined to renew the passport of human rights activist Hanan Hassan Hussein.

=== 20 July ===
The RSF announced the death of Brigadier General Abdel Rahman Al-Bishi, its head of operations in Sennar and Blue Nile States, with Sudanese media reporting that he had been killed in an SAF airstrike.

=== 23 July ===
The RSF seized control of a garrison of the SAF's 66th Infantry Brigade in the Abu Arif area, located near the South Sudanese border and Al Jabalayn in Sennar State. It also attacked the village of Al-Halba in White Nile State as part of an offensive to take the city of Ed Dueim.

=== 24 July ===
The RSF claimed to have taken the town of El Suki in Sennar state, 45 kilometers southeast of Sennar.

=== 26 July ===
The RSF seized control over the villages of Al-Trirat Al-Kufa, Ibrahim Janqoh, Ku' Al-Nahl, Trira Madani, Al-Khalij, and Qaladima during its advance towards Sennar city.

=== 27 July ===
At least 25 people were killed in shelling and drone attacks by the RSF in El Fasher. A health ministry official claimed that chemical weapons were used in the attacks.

=== 29 July ===
Two suspected RSF drones targeted government buildings in Ad-Damir, River Nile State, and an SAF base in Rabak.

=== 30 July ===
Al-Burhan survived an assassination attempt by a drone in Jubayt, Red Sea State, during a military graduation ceremony at the Jubayt army base. Five others were killed in the attack.

The SAF attacked SPLM–N (al-Hilu) positions in Dalang and seized the areas of Karkaba, home to an oil pumping station, and Jabal Koun, both located five kilometers south of the town.

=== 31 July ===
The Sudanese Civil Aviation Authority reopened the airspace over Red Sea, Kassala and Gedaref States to air traffic for the first time since the start of the war.

== August 2024 ==
=== 1 August ===
Twenty-three people were killed while 24 others were injured in an RSF raid on the village of El Adnab in Gezira State. Two people were killed by shelling on the Central Market of Khartoum.

The SAF retook the Hamad Al-Nil area and the vicinity of the Al-Mansoura roundabout in Omdurman from the RSF.

The Famine Early Warning Systems Network declared a state of famine at the Zamzam IDP camp in El Fasher. The Sudanese government subsequently accused the RSF of causing the famine.

=== 3 August ===
The RSF launched its first attack on Blue Nile State from Sennar since the beginning of the war, with the group and the SAF contesting control over Al-Tadamun and the RSF claiming to have taken Gireiwa.

Twenty-three people were killed by RSF shelling in El Fasher, while seven members of the same family were killed in an SAF airstrike on the El Salam Abuha IDP camp in the northeast of the city. The Darfur Joint Protection Force also claimed to have repelled the RSF's largest ground attack on the city.

=== 4 August ===
The SAF claimed to have secured the western and northern fronts of the Engineers Corps as well as the Mansoura neighborhood of Omdurman.

The SAF also bombed and killed children in the famine-hit Zamzam IDP camp in El Fasher.

=== 6 August ===
Two people were killed after SAF warplanes crossed into South Sudanese airspace and bombed the town of Khortumbak in Upper Nile State.

=== 10 August ===
The SAF claimed to have repelled separate RSF assaults near Wad Faqisa in the boundary between Gedaref and Gezira States and in El Fasher, inflicting hundreds of casualties. The governor of North Darfur accused the RSF of killing 28 civilians and injuring 46 others in the attack on El Fasher.

=== 11 August ===
The RSF was accused of killing 11 people in an attack on the town of Jalqni, Sennar State.

=== 13 August ===
Civilian authorities affiliated with the SPLM–N declared a state of famine over parts of South Kordofan, including the Nuba Mountains, and Blue Nile States affecting around three million people.

=== 14 August ===
A US-led initiative to promote peace talks between the SAF and the RSF opened in Geneva, but was not attended by either of the warring parties.

=== 15 August ===
The RSF was accused of killing 108 people and injuring 150 others in an attack on the village of Galgani, Sennar State.

The Sudanese government reopened the Adré border crossing with Chad on a three-month basis as part of efforts to allow the delivery of humanitarian aid to Darfur.

=== 16 August ===
Twenty people were killed in an RSF attack on the village of El Majma Goz El Naga, Gezira State. Six people were also killed in another RSF attack in Beida, Sennar State, while the group also set fire to the regional bus station of Wad Madani.

=== 17 August ===
Ten people were killed in SAF airstrikes in the Al-Fazarab neighborhood of Kharoum Bahri.

=== 18 August ===
The RSF claimed to have captured more than 100 Ethiopians fighting for the SAF in El Fao, Gedaref State.

Clashes broke out between the SAF and the SPLM–N (al-Hilu) in Kador, South Kordofan, after SAF warplanes reportedly dropped military supplies on an SPLM–N camp by accident. Reports said that the SPLM–N camp was taken by the SAF following the fighting.

=== 19 August ===
The SAF launched airstrikes on Mellit and El Taweisha in North Darfur, causing an unknown number of fatalities and injured in the latter town.

=== 20 August ===
At least 15 people were killed in SAF airstrikes in Ed Daein. Among sites targeted were the city's teaching hospital and a displacement centre.

The SAF claimed to have made advances in the El Doha Park neighbourhood of southwest Khartoum.

=== 21 August ===
The UN announced the entry of twelve trucks carrying humanitarian aid for famine victims in Kereinik, Darfur, which passed through the reopened Adré border crossing with Chad.

=== 22 August ===
The Sudanese government filed charges against 12 foreign nationals whom it accused of being mercenaries from the RSF.

Authorities affiliated with the SPLM–N (al-Hilu) reported 109 deaths from malnutrition caused by the ongoing famine in South Kordofan and Blue Nile States.

=== 26 August ===
Twenty-five people were killed and 40 others were injured by RSF shelling in the Abu Shouk IDP camp.

Seven militants were killed during clashes between rival factions of the RSF in Mellit.

=== 27 August ===
South Sudan announced a halt in the export of oil products transiting through Sudan, citing the ongoing war.

=== 30 August ===
Seven people were killed by RSF shelling in Omdurman.

The RSF claimed to have retaken Bunzuqa in Sennar State, while the SAF claimed to have retaken Galgani and Al-Lukundi as well as Wad Fiqisha in Gedaref State.

=== 31 August ===
Five people were killed in an SAF airstrike on the Khamsa Dagayeg IDP camp in Zalingei. Eleven people were killed in a separate airstrike in Mellit.

== September 2024 ==
=== 2 September ===
Ten people were killed in SAF airstrikes on Mellit.

The SAF repelled an RSF attack on the Khattab and Kadaro garrisons in Khartoum Bahri.

The RSF was accused of summarily executing seven civilians in the Salama North area of Khartoum Bahri.

=== 4 September ===
The SLM-TC accused the SAF of bombing areas under its control in Korma, North Darfur.

=== 5 September ===
In South Sudan, the commissioner of Raga County in Western Bahr el Ghazal reported the presence of RSF units in his jurisdiction who had entered from South Darfur. However, the local military commander in the area denied the claims.

=== 8 September ===
At least 40 people were killed by RSF shelling on Sennar.

The SAF claimed to have thwarted the "largest" drone attack by the RSF on El Fasher, shooting down 30 drones in the process.

The UN estimated that at least 20,000 people had been killed in the conflict.

=== 11 September ===
Three people were killed after being hit by an RSF anti-aircraft missile in El Fasher that originally targeted an SAF airdrop. The SAF claimed to have shot down an RSF suicide drone over Shendi.

The UN Security Council voted unanimously to extend its weapons embargo and other sanctions relating to the war in Sudan until 2025.

=== 12 September ===
The SAF claimed to have repelled an RSF assault on El Fasher, killing 80 militants and destroying 20 vehicles. Among the RSF dead was a prominent commander, Abdul Rahman Qarn Shata.

=== 13 September ===
The SAF claimed to have retaken the southern hospital of El Fasher from the RSF.

=== 14 September ===
Six SAF soldiers were killed in a friendly-fire airstrike on the Sixth Infantry Division garrison in El Fasher.

=== 18 September ===
The National Umma Party claimed that 45 people were killed in a drone strike on a bus that was travelling through RSF-controlled territory in Taiba El Hasnab, near the border of Khartoum and White Nile States, on its way from Rabak to Khartoum.

=== 19 September ===
The SAF claimed to have retaken the village of Al-Shayqab, 12 kilometers west of Wad Madani, from the RSF.

The RSF was accused of killing 40 people in a raid on the village of Qoz Al-Naqa and killing four others in a separate raid on Um Jalud, both in Gezira State.

=== 20 September ===
Three people were killed by RSF shelling in El Fasher.

Médecins Sans Frontières accused the RSF of seizing one of its trucks carrying medical aid for Kosti at a checkpoint in Al Shigig, White Nile State.

=== 21 September ===
Fourteen people were killed by RSF shelling in El Fasher. Four people were also killed by RSF shelling in Omdurman.

An Ilyushin Il-76 cargo aircraft of unknown origin was reported to have landed at the RSF-controlled Nyala Airport for unknown purposes.

=== 23 September ===
Fifteen people were killed by RSF shelling on the Sabreen market in Omdurman.

=== 24 September ===
The SAF launched airstrikes on Nyala Airport, destroying its runway, control tower and offices. Airstrikes also hit communications jamming systems in Jabal Nyala, the RSF-occupied garrison of the SAF's 16th Division, and Kas District.

The Attorney-General of Sudan, Fath Al-Tayfour, formally accused Abdallah Hamdok and 15 other leaders of Tagadum of complicity in war crimes and genocide committed by the RSF and called for a red notice to be issued by Interpol. Tagadum denied the charges.

The United Nations warned world leaders of the continuing violence in Sudan. US President Joe Biden addressed the United Nations General Assembly calling for an end to "arming the generals" in Sudan.

=== 25 September ===
The SAF launched a major offensive in the Khartoum area, retaking the Halfaya, Blue Nile, White Nile and El Mak Nimr bridges as well as the University of Khartoum and claiming to have killed hundreds of RSF militants. At least four people were killed by RSF shelling in Karari.

=== 26 September ===
At least 18 people were killed by suspected RSF shelling on a livestock market in El Fasher.

=== 27 September ===
At least 62 people were killed by RSF shelling in El Fasher.

The SAF claimed to have retaken the Kadru suburb of Khartoum Bahri from the RSF. The RSF was reported to have retreated from Geneina and were moving towards Kulbus, 70 kilometres to the north.

=== 28 September ===
The SAF was reported to have reached the southern edge of Halfaya in Khartoum Bahri and claimed to have retaken the headquarters of the Zain telecommunications company in Al-Muqrin, Khartoum.

=== 29 September ===
The United Arab Emirates accused the SAF of bombing the residence of its ambassador in Khartoum in an airstrike. The SAF blamed the RSF for the incident.

Six people were killed in an SAF airstrike on the Al-Azhari and Al-Ingaz districts of Khartoum.

The RSF broke off peace negotiations with the SAF in response to the latter's offensive in Khartoum.

=== 30 September ===
The RSF, Tagadum, and the Beja Congress party accused the Al-Bara' ibn Malik Battalion, an Islamist-affiliated militia allied with the SAF, of killing 70 youth soup kitchen volunteers in Halfaya, Khartoum Bahri, for allegedly collaborating with the RSF.

The Darfur Joint Protection Force was reported to have taken Jebel Awoum, 50 kilometres west of Geneina, and Kulbus from the RSF.

== October 2024 ==
=== 1 October ===
The RSF claimed to have killed 450 soldiers of the Darfur Joint Protection Force and captured more than 137 vehicles in an ambush on the latter's convoy near Melha, North Darfur. The Joint Force denied the claims and said that it had pushed back the RSF towards Mellit.

The SLM–Nur and the Sudan Liberation Forces led by El Tahir Hajar formally established a neutral military alliance aimed at protecting civilians in Darfur following negotiations in South Sudan.

=== 2 October ===
The Darfur Joint Protection Force seized the Bir Mazza base, 28 kilometers north of Kutum, from the RSF, enabling them to take control over the tri-border area between Sudan, Libya and Chad. The joint force also destroyed RSF outposts at Wadi Hor, Wadi Ambar, and Bir Marqi, seized Wadi El Maghreb, north of Kutum, and forced the RSF to retreat to Damrat Ghereir, on the outskirts of Kutum. It also took full control over the road connecting Mellit with Al Dabbah in Northern State.

=== 3 October ===
The SAF claimed to have retaken the al-Mahatta area of Jabal Moya from the RSF.

The SAF retook the villages of Fangoga and Jebel El Aawar in the Jebel Moya area from the RSF, and shot down three drones east of Atbara.

=== 4 October ===
At least 65 people, including 13 children, were killed and more than 200 others were injured in SAF airstrikes on the town market of El Koma, North Darfur.

=== 5 October ===
At least 30 people were killed and more than 100 others were injured in SAF airstrikes on Hamrat al-Sheikh and Abu Zuama in North Kordofan.

The SAF claimed to have retaken the entirety of Jebel Moya from the RSF, effectively isolating the latter's positions in Singa, Dinder and other parts of Sennar State.

=== 7 October ===
The RSF was reported to have begun withdrawing from the East Nile district of Khartoum State. It also ordered the evacuation of civilians from the Hilat Hamad, Hilat Khogali, and Al-Danaqla neighborhoods.

More than 100 people were killed or wounded in SAF airstrikes on the Fur Market in Hasaheisa, Gezira State.

=== 8 October ===
The US imposed sanctions on Hemedti's brother Algoney Hamdan Daglo Musa for his role in controlling a UAE-based front company that facilitated the importation of vehicles equipped with machine guns into Sudan that were used by the RSF.

The SAF claimed to have retaken the town of Jariwa in Blue Nile State from the RSF.

At least 20 people were killed in an RSF attack on the village of Al-Damukiya, near El-Obeid.

The Darfur Joint Protection Force accused the RSF of executing two of the former's fighters who were captured in North Darfur.

=== 9 October ===
Hemedti accused Egypt of participating in SAF operations and launching airstrikes on RSF positions in Jebel Moya, which Cairo denied. Hemedti also claimed that there were Tigrayan, Eritrean, Azerbaijani and Ukrainian mercenaries participating in the conflict.

=== 11 October ===
Six people were killed in an RSF attack on the village of Umm Maliha in Gezira State, while 16 people were injured by RSF shelling on Omdurman.

=== 12 October ===
At least 23 people were killed and 40 others were injured in SAF airstrikes in the Southern Belt of Khartoum.

In Khartoum Bahri, the SAF retook the neighborhoods of Al-Darushab, and Al-Samrab as well as the Aboud Gardens and the Bahri government school.

=== 13 October ===
The SAF retook the police station and mosque of El Lamab in southwest Khartoum as well as the Al-Mugran water station.

=== 16 October ===
Oxfam said that more than 750,000 people in Sudan were facing starvation.

=== 18 October ===
The SAF launched a major offensive in El Faw in Gedaref State as part of an attempt to advance towards Wad Madani, reaching to within 20–25 kilometres from the Hantoub Bridge on the Blue Nile river leading to the city and retaking 12 villages in Gezira State.

The SAF announced the defection of Abu Aqla Kakil, the RSF's commander in Gezira State.

X suspended accounts belonging to Hemedti and four other RSF commanders for unspecified violations of its rules.

=== 19 October ===
The SAF reached the eastern outskirts of Dinder.

=== 21 October ===
At least 31 people were killed in an SAF airstrike on a mosque in Wad Madani, while ten people were killed in an RSF attack on the village of Tambul in Gezira State.

The RSF claimed to have retaken Kulbus from the Darfur Joint Protection Force.

The RSF claimed to have shot down an Ilyushin Il-76 cargo aircraft from Kyrgyzstan over Melha, with documents connecting it to a UAE-based company. It also claimed to have recovered a Russian passport and added that "foreign mercenaries" were among those killed aboard the aircraft. Other reports stated that the incident occurred while the plane was returning from El Fasher, where it was delivering supplies for the SAF, and that all five people on board were killed, including two Russians.

=== 22 October ===
SAF Brigadier General Ahmed Shaa Al-Din was killed during clashes near Tambul, which was briefly held by the SAF before being retaken by the RSF. The RSF also claimed that it had killed a total of 370 soldiers and captured 60 vehicles during the battle.

=== 23 October ===
The SAF retook Dinder from the RSF.

Fourteen people were killed in an RSF attack on the village of Safita al-Ghunomab in Gezira State.

Four people were killed by RSF shelling in Omdurman.

=== 24 October ===
The SAF retook Suki and Galgani from the RSF.

Three people were killed by SAF airstrikes in Mellit.

The US imposed sanctions on Mirghani Idris Suleiman, director of the Sudanese Defence Industries System, for his role in the acquisition of weapons by the SAF.

=== 25 October ===
At least 141 people were killed and 200 others were injured in an RSF attack on the village of Al-Sireha in Gezira State.

=== 27 October ===
Twelve people were killed by RSF shelling in El Fasher.

=== 29 October ===
Five people were killed in an RSF attack on Al Hilaliya in Gezira State.

=== 30 October ===
Six people were killed in an RSF attack on Wad Al-Fadl in Gezira State.

=== 31 October ===
Eight people were killed in an RSF attack on Al-Faj Al-Bashir in Gezira State.

== November 2024 ==
=== 1 November ===
Two people were killed in an SAF drone strike in the Ad Hussein neighbourhood of Khartoum.

The Sudanese government began airlifting humanitarian aid towards Kadugli and Junud in South Kordofan.

=== 2 November ===
At least 12 people were killed in an RSF attack on Bireidik, North Darfur. Twelve others were killed in clashes between the SAF and the RSF in Kutum.

=== 3 November ===
The Sudanese government cancelled a 2022 agreement with the UAE-based firm Abu Dhabi Ports and Invictus Investment to develop the Abu Amama port in the Red Sea, citing Abu Dhabi's support for the RSF.

=== 4 November ===
Three people, including two militia leaders and a police officer, were killed in clashes between police and the Reserve Forces, a tribal militia allied with the SAF, in En Nahud, West Kordofan.

=== 6 November ===
The RSF was accused of shooting dead 13 people in Al Hilaliya and fatally poisoning 54 others in the city by handing out food laced with urea fertilizer.

=== 7 November ===
The SAF shot down a swarm of RSF drones in El-Fasher.

=== 8 November ===
The SAF claimed to have retaken the "13" and "Al-Listik" stations in the Samrab district of Khartoum Bahri from the RSF.

The RSF launched attacks on villages in the Qoz Al Khanjar area, 12 kilometers north of the SAF stronghold of Al Arshkol in White Nile State.

The UN Security Council imposed sanctions on the RSF's head of operations, Osman Mohamed Hamid Mohamed, and its commander in West Darfur, Abdel Rahman Jumma, for their role in human rights abuses during the conflict.

=== 11 November ===
Nine people were killed by RSF shelling in El Fasher.

=== 12 November ===
The US imposed sanctions on the RSF's commander in West Darfur, Abdel Rahman Jumma, for his role in attacks against civilians during the conflict.

Twenty-three people died in Al-Hilaliya following suspected poisoning attacks by the RSF.

=== 13 November ===
The SAF claimed to have shot down seven RSF drones over El Fasher.

=== 14 November ===
At least 14 people were killed in an RSF attack on the village of Al-Tomsa in Gezira State.

=== 17 November ===
Five people were killed by suspected RSF shelling on a mosque in Omdurman.

The governor of South Darfur ordered the dismissal of 70 tribal leaders for supporting the RSF.

=== 18 November ===
The SAF shot down several drones over the town of Al-Fadlab near Atbara, in what was believed to be an RSF attack on Atbara Airport.

Russia vetoed a UN Security Council draft resolution proposed by Sierra Leone and the United Kingdom calling for a ceasefire in Sudan, claiming ulterior motives by Western countries.

=== 20 November ===
Ten people, including four RSF militants were killed in an RSF attack on the village of Tekina in Gezira State.

=== 21 November ===
The SAF claimed to have retaken the town of Al Lakndi, southeast of Singa, from the RSF.

The SLM claimed to have seized weapons from a convoy in the tri-border region with Chad and Libya believed to be destined for the RSF from Chad, adding that it had also recovered Colombian identity papers and records showing travel from the UAE.

=== 23 November ===
The SAF retook Singa from the RSF.

Seven people were killed by RSF shelling on the Abu Shouk IDP camp.

An aid convoy from the WFP arrived in Zamzam IDP camp for the first time since the declaration of famine in the area in August.

=== 25 November ===
The SAF claimed to have fully secured Singa and to have reopened the roads connecting it to Mayirno, which it also retook, and to Sennar.

=== 26 November ===
The SAF claimed to have broken the RSF siege of Ad-Damazin after clearing the road connecting it with Singa and retaking the towns of Abu Hajar and Wad al-Nil.

The Sudanese government accused the RSF of looting aid from a WFP convoy travelling from Port Sudan to Zamzam IDP camp as it passed through Armel, on the border between West and North Kordofan, adding that the looted items were diverted to Nyala.

=== 27 November ===
An SAF artillery base in Atbara was struck by two suicide drones.

=== 29 November ===
The SAF claimed to have shot down multiple drones launched by the RSF on El Fasher and Merowe Airport.

=== 30 November ===
The Darfur Joint Force claimed to have intercepted an RSF supply convoy near Nyala, resulting in the deaths of 30 RSF militants, the destruction of eight vehicles and the seizure of nine drones produced by a company registered in the Czech Republic. The force alleged that the convoy originated from Chad and was supported and financed by the UAE.

== December 2024 ==
=== 1 December ===
An unspecified number of people were killed in an RSF missile attack on the Zamzam IDP camp.

Colombia issued an apology to the Sudanese government over the involvement of its nationals working as mercenaries for the RSF.

=== 2 December ===
Six people were killed by RSF shelling in El Fasher. Eight others were killed by RSF shelling on Zamzam IDP camp.

The SAF retook Um Al-Qura, 40 kilometres east of Wad Madani, and the West Sennar Sugar Factory, about 60 kilometres southwest of Wad Madani. It also reached Wad Al-Haddad, about seven kilometres south of the RSF-held city of Al-Haj Abdullah in Gezira State.

=== 4 December ===
Nine people were killed in SAF airstrikes in El Koma, North Darfur.

=== 5 December ===
Twenty people were killed in an RSF attack on Abu Zureiga, near Zamzam IDP camp. Four others were killed by RSF shelling on the camp, while at least seven people were killed by RSF shelling on the livestock market of El Fasher.

=== 6 December ===
Seven people were killed in an SAF airstrike on a mosque in Shambat, Khartoum Bahri.

=== 7 December ===
The RSF claimed to have retaken Um Al-Qura, while the SAF claimed to have retaken Wad El Haddad.

The RSF withdrew from the Al-Safiya neighbourhood of Khartoum Bahri. Three people were killed by RSF shelling in Karari, Omdurman.

=== 8 December ===
At least 28 people were killed and 37 others were injured in a drone strike on a fuel station in New Soug Sitta in the Mayo neighbourhood of Khartoum.

The RSF claimed to have taken the town of Bout in Blue Nile State and the Joda border crossing in White Nile State leading to South Sudan, while the SAF claimed to have repelled RSF attacks in those areas.

=== 9 December ===
More than 100 people were killed in an SAF airstrike on a market in Kabkabiya. An SAF airstrike on Nyala Airport destroyed its runway, control towers and a jamming site.

The SAF claimed to have shot down several drones over Atbara Airport.

=== 10 December ===
At least 65 people were killed by extensive RSF shelling in Karari, Omdurman, while nine others were killed by RSF shelling in Zamzam IDP camp.

Twenty-two people were killed in an attack on a bus near the Block 17 transport station in El Sawara, Omdurman.

=== 11 December ===
The RSF launched a drone attack on SAF base in Shendi, causing a temporary power outage.

Fifteen people were killed by RSF shelling on Zamzam IDP camp.

Six people were killed in an SAF airstrike on Nyala.

=== 12 December ===
The SAF retook the al-Samrab neighbourhood of Khartoum Bahri from the RSF.

Sixteen people were killed by RSF shelling in El Fasher.

=== 13 December ===
Nine people were killed in an RSF drone strike on the Saudi Hospital in El Fasher.

=== 14 December ===
Fifteen people were killed in an SAF drone strike on a civilian dairy transport vehicle along the Omdurman-Bara road between Khartoum and North Kordofan.

=== 15 December ===
Thirty-eight people were killed in RSF missile strikes on El Fasher.

Nine people were killed in an SAF airstrike in Wad Madani. Fourteen others were killed in clashes between the SAF and the RSF northeast of Um Rawaba.

The Central Bank of Sudan announced the resumption of interbank transfers following their suspension at the start of the conflict in 2023.

=== 16 December ===
The EU imposed sanctions on former Military Intelligence chief Salah Gosh, RSF operations chief Osman Hamid, West Darfur governor Tijani Karshoum, and SAF military intelligence director Mohamed Ali for their role in war crimes, undermining the transition towards a civilian government in Sudan and procuring equipment and weapons used by their respective sides in the conflict.

The SAF claimed to have killed 17 RSF militants and captured four others in an ambush near Jebel Kabashi, Khartoum State.

=== 17 December ===
The RSF launched drone attacks on Kenana Airport and Ed Duweim in White Nile State as well as in Wad Ashana in North Kordofan, killing a soldier.

=== 18 December ===
Twenty-eight people were killed by RSF shelling in El Fasher. Four people were killed in an SAF airstrike on a school sheltering IDPs in Nyala.

=== 19 December ===
Three employees of the World Food Programme were killed in an airstrike on a WFP field office in Yabus, Blue Nile State.

More than 50 people were killed following two days of RSF attacks in Abu Zureiga, south of El Fasher.

=== 20 December ===
The UN reported that 782 civilians had been killed and 1,143 others were injured from RSF attacks on El Fasher since May.

=== 21 December ===
The Darfur Joint Force claimed to have seized al-Zurq at the tri-border point between Sudan, Chad in Libya in North Darfur state, from the RSF.

=== 22 December ===
Five RSF militants were killed in an RSF attack on al-Tamtam, Northern State.

The RSF claimed to have retaken al-Zurq from the Darfur Joint Force.

=== 23 December ===
The RSF accused the SAF of damaging the Jebel Aulia Dam in airstrikes, causing flooding in White Nile State. The SAF accused the RSF of causing the reservoir to flood horizontally by closing the dam.

The SAF retook the campus of Mashreq University and reached the northeastern part of Shambat, Khartoum Bahri.

The Sudanese government suspended its participation in the Integrated Food Security Phase Classification (IPC), accusing the organisation of "issuing unreliable reports that undermine Sudan’s sovereignty and dignity".

=== 24 December ===
The IPC declared a state of famine over the Abu Shouk and El Salam IDP camps in North Darfur and parts of the Nuba Mountains. The Sudanese government rejected the findings.

=== 25 December ===
At least ten fighters were killed in an RSF drone strike on the Al-Ma'aqil training camp hosting pro-SAF paramilitary groups southeast of Shendi. Eight police officers were killed in an RSF drone strike on a Central Police Reserve base in El Fasher.

The Saudi Hospital, the last remaining hospital in operation in El Fasher, was destroyed by RSF shelling.

=== 26 December ===
Three people were killed by RSF shelling in Abu Shouk IDP camp.

A convoy carrying humanitarian aid arrived in RSF-controlled areas of south Khartoum for the first time since the start of the conflict.

=== 28 December ===
At least seven people were killed by SAF airstrikes in south Khartoum.

The SAF claimed to have destroyed an Emirati cargo aircraft carrying supplies for the RSF and killed several foreign nationals during airstrikes in Nyala.

The RSF banned, in areas under its control, the usage of new banknotes of the Sudanese pound issued by the Sudanese government.

=== 30 December ===
The SAF-aligned Sudan Shield Forces claimed to have taken the town of Wad Rawah in Gezira State from the RSF following a surprise attack.

=== 31 December ===
Burhan denied reports of famine and accused the RSF and their allies of killing, displacement, and starvation. He added that the SAF was committed to international law and that the government was working to restore infrastructure and basic services.

The SAF sentenced 250 to death or life imprisonment for supporting the RSF.

Seven people were killed in RSF attacks on Wad Rawah.
