= Territory of the Rapid Support Forces =

Quasi-state in Sudan

- 2023–2025
- Flag of the Rapid Support Forces

- Territory controlled by the Rapid Support Forces in July 2023 colored in blue

- Territory controlled by the Rapid Support Forces in March 2024 in dark green
- Status: Unrecognized quasi-state with a Civil Administration from December 2024 on
- Capital: Various areas of Darfur
- Largest city: Nyala
- Demonym: Sudanese
- Commander of the Rapid Support Forces
  - 2023–2025: Hemedti
- Head of the Legal Committee for the Supreme Council for Civil Administrations
  - 2024–2025: Yousef Mukhair
- Establishment: Sudanese civil war (2023–present)
- History
  - Established during the start of the Sudanese civil war during the Battle of Khartoum in 2023: 15 April 2023
  - Civil Administration established: 1 December 2024
  - Formation of the Government of Peace and Unity: 15 April 2025
- Time zone: UTC+2 (CAT)
| Preceded by | Succeeded by |
| Republic of Sudan | Government of Peace and Unity |
- Today part of: Republic of Sudan, Government of Peace and Unity

The Territory of the Rapid Support Forces refers to the areas controlled by the Rapid Support Forces from 2023 until 2025, when the Government of Peace and Unity took over.

== Background ==
Tensions arose between al-Burhan and Hemedti over al-Burhan's restoration to the office of old-guard Islamist officials who had dominated the Omar al-Bashir government. Hemedti saw the appointment of these officials as a signal that al-Burhan was attempting to maintain the dominance of Khartoum's traditional elite over Sudanese politics. This was a danger to the RSF's political position, as said elites were hostile to Hemedti due to his ethnic background as a Darfuri Arab. Hemedti's expression of regret over the October 2021 coup signalled a widening divide between him and al-Burhan.

Tensions between the RSF and the SAF began to escalate in February 2023, as the RSF began to recruit members across Sudan. Throughout February and early March, the RSF built up in the Sudanese capital of Khartoum, until a deal was brokered on 11 March and the RSF withdrew. As part of this deal negotiations were conducted between the SAF, RSF, and civilian leaders, but these negotiations were delayed and halted by political disagreements. Chief among the disputes was the integration of the RSF into the military: the RSF insisted on a 10-year timetable for its integration into the regular army, while the army demanded integration within two years. Other contested issues included the status given to RSF officers in the future hierarchy, and whether RSF forces should be under the command of the army chief rather than Sudan's commander-in-chief, al-Burhan.

On 11 April 2023, RSF forces deployed near the city of Merowe as well as in Khartoum. Government forces ordered them to leave and were refused. This led to clashes when RSF forces took control of the Soba military base south of Khartoum. On 13 April, RSF forces began their mobilization, raising fears of a potential rebellion against the junta (TSC). The SAF has declared the mobilization illegal.

== Establishment ==
On 15 April 2023, the RSF took over the headquarters of the state broadcaster, Sudan TV and the Merowe Airport, the RSF attacked SAF bases across Sudan, including Khartoum and the Khartoum Airport. The RSF captured the presidential palace. Hemedti claimed that the RSF controlled most of the city's government buildings, but this was disputed by al-Burhan. With that, the Rapid Support Forces took over their first territories.

== Development between 2023 and 2025 ==
=== Controlled areas and loss and takeover of more areas ===
The RSF started an occupation of the Khartoum International Airport on 15 April 2023, which lasted until 25 March 2025. Its control over the Merowe Airport ended after some days with the Battle of Merowe Airport. On 2 June 2023, the RSF got control over the National Museum of Sudan complex in Khartoum. The headquarters of the Police Central Reserve Forces in Khartoum was captured by the RSF on 25 June 2023.

Major takeover of areas however started on 4 August 2023, where the RSF took full control over all of Central Darfur. In September of the same year, the RSF retreated from Um Rawaba in North Kordofan. Later that month, they tried to take over the town of El-Odeya in West Kordofan. On 6 October 2023, the RSF claimed to have seized control of Al-Ailafoon, 30 kilometres east of Khartoum, and established positions in Al-Bashaqra, Wad Rawah, and Al-Aidij in Gezira State. The SAF however denied that the RSF took control of these areas and that they established positions. The same month, the RSF captured various areas like Nyala and the headquarters of the SAF's 16th Infantry Division in the city, the Balila oilfield and its airport in West Kordofan, along with 15 SAF vehicles (The RSF withdraw from Balila after this.), the headquarters of the SAF's 21st Infantry Division in Zalingei (other parts of Zalingei were already taken over by the RSF since August 2023), the SAF's 6th Infantry Division in El-Fasher and also shelled the Al-Takrir neighborhood. The next month, the RSF took over various areas like the headquarters of the SAF's 15th Infantry Division in Geneina, the Shag Omar oilfield in Abu Karinka, East Darfur and attacked the Zarga Um Hadid oilfield in Adila. Also, it took control of the Al-Nujoumi Air Base in Jabal Awliya (which the SAF denied), a bridge in the area linking Khartoum and Omdurman, army base in Jebel Aulia, the headquarters of the SAF's 20th Infantry Division in Ed Daein. The RSF took over Wad Madani after the First battle of Wad Madani in December 2023 and occupied it until January 2025. The headquarters of the 1st Brigade of the SAF'S 1st Infantry Division in Wad Madani was also captured by the RSF following the takeover of Wad Madani, they also occupied the eastern entrance to the Hantoub Bridge. A major achievement of the RSF in December 2023 was the full occupation of the Gezira State. The takeover of the town al-Hasaheisa in the Gezira State, the town El Geteina and of the town Habila in South Kordofan.

In March 2024, the RSF took over El Medina Arab, Gezira State, and tried to reach El Managil. The Wad al-Bashir Bridge in Omdurman was re-occupied by the RSF. While this was a victory for the RSF, days before they lost the Doha neighbourhood in Omdurman to the SAF. A victory for the RSF was the capturing of the town of Mellit, North Darfur, which cemented its hold over areas north of El Fasher in April. In May the RSF had only small achievements like the re-occupation of Um Rawaba and of the Golo water reservoir west of El Fasher, which was recaptured by the SAF the next day. In July the RSF captured Al-Fulah, the capital of the state of West Korodofan. While a victory for the RSF, the SAF re-took the Sennar Sugar Factory and the Jabal Moya area in the Sennar State days later. After the re-take, the RSF began to advance into the Sennar State, taking over Jebel Moya and the capital Singa and there located headquarter of the 17th Infantry Division.

Another major achievement for the RSF which happened in June, was the occupation Mazmoum, Wad an-Nail, Suki and Dinder, and were advancing towards the border of South Sudan. The SAF struck back and re-took the Doha neighbourhood and its surroundings in Omdurman and later also recaptured Dinder from the RSF. One day after the recapturing of Dinder, the RSF occupied Al-Meiram, West Kordofan. One day later, the RSF captured Dinder again from the SAF. Later in July, the RSF seized the town of El Suki in the Sennar State and the villages of Al-Trirat Al-Kufa, Ibrahim Janqoh, Ku' Al-Nahl, Trira Madani, Al-Khalij, and Qaladima. In August the RSF claimed to have taken Gireiwa. Days later, the RSF claimed to have recaptured Bunzuqa in Sennar State, while the SAF claimed to have seized Galgani and Al-Lukundi as well as Wad Fiqisha in Gedaref State. The SAF also made advances in the El Doha Park neighbourhood of southwest Khartoum. In September the SAF took back the southern hospital of El Fasher and village of Al-Shayqab. In the end of September, the SAF recaptured the Kadru suburb of Khartoum Bahri, the same day the RSF retreated from Geneina to reach Kulbus. One day later, the SAF reported that they reached the southern edge of Halfaya in Khartoum Bahri and that they also had recaptured the headquarters of the Zain telecommunications company in Al-Muqrin, Khartoum.

In October the loses of the RSF became greater. On 2 October, the Darfur Joint Protection Force seized the Bir Mazza base, 28 kilometers north of Kutum, from the RSF, enabling them to take control over the tri-border area between Sudan, Libya and Chad. The joint force also destroyed RSF outposts at Wadi Hor, Wadi Ambar, and Bir Marqi, seized Wadi El Maghreb, north of Kutum, and forced the RSF to retreat to Damrat Ghereir, on the outskirts of Kutum. It also took full control over the road connecting Mellit with Al Dabbah in Northern State. On 3 October, the SAF re-took al-Mahatta area of Jabal Moya, Fangoga and Jebel El Aawar in the Jebel Moya area. On 5 October, the SAF reported to have recaptured the entirety of Jebel Moya from the RSF, effectively isolating the latter's positions in Singa, Dinder and other parts of Sennar State. Two days later, the RSF retreated from various areas like the East Nile district of Khartoum State. On 8 October, the SAF seized the town of Jariwa in Blue Nile State. Further on 12 October in Khartoum Bahri, the SAF retook the neighborhoods of Al-Darushab, and Al-Samrab as well as the Aboud Gardens and the Bahri government school. On the next day, they took over police station and mosque of El Lamab in southwest Khartoum and the Al-Mugran water station. Alone on 18 October, the SAF retook twelve villages from the RSF, the next day the SAF reached the eastern outskirts of Dinder. Two days later on 21 October, the RSF reported to have retaken Kulbus from the Darfur Joint Protection Force. After that one victory of the RSF, the SAF retook Dinder.

In late December, the Darfur Joint Protection Force seized al-Zurq from the RSF, the next day the RSF re-took al-Zurq from the Darfur Joint Protection Force. After this one victory of the Rapid Support Forces, the Sudanese Armed Forces captured the campus of Mashreq University and reached the northeastern part of Shambat, Khartoum Bahri and the SAF's ally Sudan Shield Forces reported to have seized Wad Rawah.

On 1 January 2025, the RSF took over Wad Rawah until 1 February 2025, when it was recaptured by the SAF. Also, the SAF recaptured the town of El Geteina in February, which was previously occupied by the Rapid Support Forces from the December 2023 on. During the rest of January, the SAF and the Sudan Shield Forces advanced and retook many territories including the administrative center of Ombadda, Al-Shagla, the western section of the Al-Fitaihab neighborhood, Haj Abdallah, Mahalla, Al-Shabarqa, Um al-Qura, Wad al-Abyad, Wad Madani, Al-Rawad residential complex in Khartoum, Karkaraia, Hajar al-Jawad. (Note: Sources:) The RSF also advanced and took over the Al-Hallaf, Drishaqi and Mao in North Darfur. Further, the SAF captured Rotana Mills, also captured were Signal Corp's base in Khartoum, General Headquarters in Khartoum, El-Jeili oil refinery, l-Azba, Kafouri, Ad Babaker, Ramallah neighborhoods of Khartoum North continued and El Mek Nimr Bridge. The SAF took over the RSF's Medical Directorate located in the former SAF Paratroopers base in Shambat, as well as the Blue and Bashir Towers in Khartoum Bahri. More gains in Khartoum Bahri and advanced towards the El Mek Nimr Bridge, forcing the RSF out of almost the entire city except in Hillet Hamad. On the 30 January, the Sudanese Armed Forces seized the city of Umm Ruwaba, El Obeid, Al-Azba and the eastern part of the Kafouri neighbourhood of Khartoum Bahri.

Between early February and late March, the SAF claimed to have seized many towns like Wad Rawah, al-Nabati, al-Asaylat, Um Daw Ban, Al 'Aylafun areas of the East Nile locality al-Kamelin, the al-Rumaila district of Khartoum as well as the central mint, El Tekeina, El Maseed, El Noba areas south of Giad, the Saria Industrial Complex near Abu Hamama in Khartoum, Wadi El Akhdar in the Sharg El Nil area of Khartoum Bahri, the Traffic Signs and License Plates Factory along with the entire industrial area of Khartoum, Al-Masoudiya in Khartoum state, Abu Quta, Kafouri district of Khartoum Bahri, the El Nour Islamic Complex and the Bahri Thermal Power Plant in Khartoum, Kafouri area, the last RSF stronghold in Khartoum North, and the city of Er Rahad in North Kordofan. It also retook the Ministry of Animal Resources, the Tax Tower, the Malaysian Tower, and the Medical Supply Department headquarters near central Khartoum, the Kober Bridge connecting Khartoum with Khartoum Bahri, as well as large parts of El Sajana and El Hilla El Jadeeda in southeastern Khartoum, El Hurriya Bridge in central Khartoum, as well as Sidra. (Note: Sources:)

== Governance ==
=== Aid ===
Hemedti announced in 2023 the creation of the Sudan Agency for Relief and Humanitarian Operations (SARHO) an aid agency of the RSF which operated in the areas controlled by the Rapid Support Forces. Foreign humanitarian aid in the controlled territory of the Rapid Support Forces only started one year later.

=== Ban on fleeing ===
The RSF imposed a ban on residents of West Darfur from fleeing to the Republic of Chad with limited exceptions shortly after the takeover of the border post at Kereneik.

=== Evacuation ===
On 7 October 2024, when the RSF began withdrawing from the East Nile district of Khartoum State, it ordered the evacuation of civilians from the Hilat Hamad, Hilat Khogali, and Al-Danaqla neighborhoods.

=== Government buildings used by the RSF ===
The Rapid Support Forces used government buildings in Ed Daein and Nyala.

=== Governance members ===
The territory's government members were both civilian ones and also ones of the Rapid Support Forces, due that some RSF positions were also governance positions during that period.

- Leader as Commander of the Rapid Support Forces: Hemedti
- Head of the Legal Committee for the Supreme Council for Civil Administrations: Yousef Mukhair
- Head of the Civil Administration in Khartoum: Abdellatif El Hasan
- President of the Civilian Foundress Council: Nayel Babikr
- Chairman of the Committee for the Replacement of the Currency: Omar El Khalifa
- Chair of the Advisory Council of the RSF Commander: Hudeifa Abu Nuba
- Head of the RSF Guidance Department: Hasan El Turabi

=== RSF position members ===
- Commander of the Rapid Support Forces: Hemedti
- Deputy Commander of the Rapid Support Forces: Abdul Rahim Dagalo
- Head of operations of the Rapid Support Forces: Osman Mohamed Hamid Mohamed
- East Darfur Commander of the Rapid Support Forces: Abdul Rahman Jumma
- Spokespersons of the Rapid Support Forces: Yousif Ibrahim Ismaeil (2023–2024) and Mohamed Mokhtar with Al-Fateh al-Qurashi (2024–2025)

== Economy ==
Since the beginning of the civil war, markets with the name "Dagalo Markets" were found in different places like Kordofan, Darfur and the Khartoum metropolitan area, there are also common in the cities of west Sudan which is where the RSF had much power. Goods which were looted by the Rapid Support Forces, affiliated militias or criminal gangs are put on these markets by smugglers. Also, the opponent of the RSF, the SAF takes part of the "Dagalo Markets".

The Rapid Support Forces banned the new issued currency of the Republic of Sudan which was issued in December 2024.

The collapse of Sudan's economy has benefited the RSF. In the RSF-controlled areas of Khartoum, it has created work structures that make an immiserated population dependent on the RSF. This political economy was seen as part of the RSF's transformation from an irregular fighting force into an entrepreneurial system of predatory accumulation.

== Formation of the Government of Peace and Unity ==
On 18 February 2025, the Rapid Support Forces announced the establishment of a parallel government in exile. On the same day, a Sudan Founding Charter was issued to form the Sudan Founding Alliance. After a postponement on 21 February, the Sudan Founding Alliance was founded on 23 February after an agreement was signed at 2am. The next day, there were already disagreements between the different parties in the Sudan Founding Alliance. On 4 March 2025, the Sudan Founding Alliance announced that it had adopted a transitional constitutional framework to pave the way for forming a rival "Government of Peace and Unity" to administer territory under the control of the RSF and allied groups. On 8 March, the RSF announced that arrangements to form the "Government of Peace and Unity" were complete and plans to issue passports, official documents, and currency were being prepared. On 15 April, the establishment of the parallel government was announced by Hemedti, the Government of Peace and Unity was formed on the same day.

== See also ==
- Government of Peace and Unity
- Rapid Support Forces
- Republic of Sudan
- New Sudan
- Liberated Areas
