= Capture of Al-Fulah =

2024 battle in Sudan

Capture of Al Fulah
- Part of the Sudanese civil war (2023–present) and the Kordofan Campaign
| Date | 19–20 June 2024 (1 day) |
| Location | Al-Fulah and West Kordofan, Sudan |
| Result | RSF victory: RSF captures Al Fulah on June 20.; RSF later takes control over several more villages and areas in West Kordofan.; Sudanese army withdraws to Babanusa. |

Belligerents
| Republic of Sudan; Sudanese Armed Forces | Territory of the Rapid Support Forces; Rapid Support Forces |

Commanders and leaders
| Unknown | Salih Al-Foti |

Units involved
| 91st Infantry Brigade | Unknown |

Casualties and losses
| Tens of detainees executed Several vehicles, weapons, and ammunition captured. | Unknown |
- Dozens of civilians killed and injured 60% of the population flees.

The Capture of Al-Fulah was the short siege and battle over the city of Al-Fulah, the capital of the West Kordofan state. Which occurred between 19 June and 20 June 2024. The battle ended quickly with the RSF taking full control of the city by June 20, forcing the SAF units stationed there to retreat to Babanusa. The battle also allowed the RSF to take control over several key towns and areas in West Kordofan, including the city of Al-Meiram.

== Background ==
On April 15, 2023, RSF forces attacked SAF units and took control of various areas around Sudan, including in that capital of Khartoum, beginning the Sudanese civil war. The RSF's first incursions in to the West Kordofan state was on April 25 when they captured the town of Wad Banda. In January 2024, the RSF launched on assault on the city of Babanusa. This assault then turned into a siege, and displaced several thousands of people, many of whom sought refuge in Al-Fulah.

The area was strategic since it was located near several oil fields and because oil pipelines from South Sudan ran through it. Previous to its capture, RSF commanders had threatened to overrun the city and warned SAF forces and army officials to leave.

== Events ==
On Wednesday June 19, The RSF besieged the SAF's 91st Infantry Brigade in the city of Al Fulah, setting up reinforcements outside for the city. The Misseriya tribe that was native to the area attempted to persuade the SAF into withdrawing from the city and the RSF from attacking but failed. On July 20, the RSF led another assault, causing the SAF's 91 Infantry Brigade to retreat from the city and reposition themselves in Al-Udayyah, allowing the RSF to take control.

Following its capture, citizens reported that the RSF had engaged in looting in several neighborhoods including Al-Salam, Al-Wahda, and Al-Daraja, causing many residents to flee to nearby cities like En Nahud and Al-Udayyah. As much as 60% of the city's population fled. It was also reported that an unknown number of civilians had been killed and many more had also been injured in the initial assault. The RSF made a post on Twitter congratulating commander Salih Al-Foti for the victory. Videos also emerged showing RSF fighters executing tens of military detainees, as well as alleged Ethiopian mercenaries raising their country's flag in the city.

After Al-Fulah fell, the RSF began to take control over the rest of the West Kordofan area. On July 3, the RSF led an unsuccessful assault on the city of Al-Meiram. Although the SAF's 92nd Infantry Brigade was able to repel the initial assault, the units fled the city by July 4 to South Sudan. This, along with the losses from the 90th Infantry Brigade in Heglig and the El Muglad Garrison, effectively isolated the SAF's 22nd Division in Babanusa.
