= Takina (disambiguation) =

Takina may refer to:

- Takina, an ancient town of Pisidia
- Takina, Sudan, a village in Sudan
- Tākina, a convention and exhibition facility in Wellington
- Takina Inoue, a character from the anime series Lycoris Recoil
