= Abushneib =

Abushneib أبوشنيب
- Location of Abushneib in Sudan
- Coordinates: 14°53′59″N 33°00′04″E
- Country: Sudan
- State: Al Jazirah
- Time zone: UTC+2 (CAT)

Abushneib (Arabic: أبوشنيب) is a relatively big village or a small town located in the northern area of al-Gezira province, about 90 km south of Khartoum the capital of Sudan, and 100 km north west Wad-Madani, the capital of al-Gezira province. The village lies at the southern side of a main water channel (called "al-kanar" and likely an altered word of “canal”, ) which flows from the main irrigation source; the River Nile at Abu-Ushar. The canal is intended to irrigate the surrounding cultivated land plots affiliating to al-Gezira Project.

The village is also called “Hillat al-Sheikh al-Tayyib” after the name of the religious figure: al-Sheikh al-Tayib wad-haj al-Siddiq wad-Badr, or ((wad-al-Sayeh)). The late Al-Shaeikh al-Tayib was well known in Sudan and some Muslim countries not only for his leading role in propagating the teachings of Islam in the region, but also for building more than 130 mosques or religious institutes in the various areas of Sudan, including Khartoum the capital. Though he originally comes from Al-Badr, who settled earlier in Umdhawan-ban and in Ummarahi, he opted to be buried in Abushneib. His tomb is regularly visited by thousands of followers from all parts of Sudan in Eid al-Fitr and Eid al-Adha, as well as on annual obituary occasions.

== Neighborhood ==
In many aspects, the village is strongly related to and highly affected by activities in the surrounding villages such as al-Miherieba in the south, where there is the main administrative center and main market, Saleem in the west - the biggest in population, and the trilateral big village of “al-Dibaibah, Um-Shidairah, and al-Egaidah at the northern side. Actually the relation extends to cover other regional villages such as al-Shikeirat, al-Wali, Managaza, Tooris, Umboosha, Wad-al-Baseer, al-Fawwar, Um-Hamad and the other Halaween villages such as al-Timaid, Hillat Mustafa, Masa'd, Safyah, Katfiyah, wad- Battaro, Anjadho and Gaid al-Elein … up to Tabat, Wad-Bahai, and Sarasir.

== Population and social life ==
The population of Abushneib roughly ranges to 10,500, representing three or four major tribes; al-Rufa'yin, al-Dubasiyin, al-kawahlah, and al-Ja'afrah, though the last is related to the late Jaafar, their grandfather, rather than to a tribal name. Though each tribe occupies a certain separate area in the village, still they are living a harmonious social life, sharing the same joyous moments and burdens of life. Actually, these tribes are already mixed with each other now with marriage occurrences taking place now and then between couples from the different tribes.

== Economy ==
Being located in the center of three Gezira Agricultural-Project Blocks (tafateesh), most of the inhabitants of Abushneib are farmers, with each farmer having a certain irrigated land plot (hawashah) ranging in size from two to four acres in the average, at either Maktab Touris west, Riweenah north, or Abbass north east. However, with the recent decline of the Project’s returns, as the case in the other villages of al-Gezira, most of the natives tend to rely on the financial support of their relative expatriates. Other economic activities include general trading or possessing transportation trucks and operating them between the major cities of the country including Port Sudan east and Al Obayyid west. Abushneib is already reputed for its heavy trucks and lorry services since the 1940s. The village is also rich with livestock, though their number decreased drastically in the last decades due to shortage in the size and quantity of the grazing area and pasture respectively.

The village comprises more than four kindergartens, two separate elementary and two separate secondary schools for boys and girls. There are two grand mosques and two smaller ones.

Just like the nature of al-Gezira inhabitants, the villagers rely on visiting the regular weekly markets in the surrounding area for providing their daily needs, such as “Suq” al-Miherieba on Sunday and Wednesday, Abu-Ushar on Saturday and Tuesday, and Abugoota on Monday and Thursday. The shopping and medication activity extends as far as to ((al-Hasahisa)), Wad-Madani, and Khartoum according to the importance of the needed item and medical reason.

The inhabitants also have their sports activity, with the football mastering. There are more than three local competent football teams. However, at the level of the region, the competition remains very strong between the teams of al-Miherieba, Salim, and Abushneib, with the regional championship cup won by one of them in every occasion, despite the strong rivalry by other villages’ teams.

The other thing to be mentioned is that Abushneib is located in a central position connecting between many villages, and leading through the “Kanar route, which is excessively used during the rainy season for joining the Khartoum-wad-Madani-highway at Abu-Ushar. A new paved road between Al Jadeed and Abushneib is under construction.

Due to the volume of traffic, that short road leading to Abu-Ushar needs to be paved because it serves many villages and a large community up to the important town of Abugootah in the south direction. In many cases, lives were lost in the way to Abu-Ushar Hospital while carrying a seriously sick or a begetting woman due, to the bad or muddy track, particularly during the rainy season.
