= Maknun =

Village in Sudan

Maknun مكنون
- Village
- Location in Sudan
- Coordinates: 14°54′40″N 33°24′00″E
- Country: Sudan
- State: Gezira State
- Time zone: UTC+2 (CAT)

Maknun is a village in Gezira State, Sudan.

== History ==
At least 13 people were killed in the village by the Rapid Support Forces in October 2024.
