= Al Hilaliya =

Village in Sudan

- Location within Sudan
- Coordinates: 14°56′33″N 33°14′31″E
- Country: Sudan
- State: Al Jazirah
- Time zone: UTC+2 (CAT)

Al Hilaliya is a city in Gezira State, Sudan. It is located 30km from the state capital Wad Madani.

== History ==
On 29 October 2024, five people were killed in an Rapid Support Forces (RSF) attack on Al Hilaliya. On 6 November, the RSF was accused of killing at least 86 people, by shooting dead 13 people and fatally poisoning 73 others in the city of Al Hilaliya by handing out food laced with contaminated with urea fertilizer.
