= Sherif Mukhtar =

Village in Sudan

- Village
- Country: Sudan
- State: Gezira
- Time zone: UTC+2 (CAT)

Sherif Mukhtar is a village in Gezira State, Sudan.

== History ==
On 28 February 2024, the Rapid Support Forces (RSF) was accused of killing 16 people in an attack on the village of Sherif Mukhtar.
