= Tanub, Sudan =

Tanub is a large village in Al Jazirah State, central Sudan. It is southwest of the city of Alhassahissa, south of Kafr ez Zayat, and west of the city of Wad Madani. The village has a large market. The dominant tribe is the Ahalha.
