= El Medina Arab =

Village in Sudan

- Village
- Country: Sudan
- State: Gezira

Population (1973)
  - Total: 2,890
- Time zone: UTC+2 (CAT)

El Medina Arab is a small farming town in Gezira State, Sudan.

== History ==
On 5 March 2024, the Rapid Support Forces (RSF) claimed to have taken control of El Medina Arab, Gezira State, and were advancing towards El Managil.
