= Ali Yaqoub Gibril =

Sudanese military leader (died 2024)

- علي يعقوب جبريل
- Born: 1 January 1964; Zalingei, Central Darfur, Sudan
- Died: 14 June 2024 (aged 60); El Fasher, Sudan

Ali Yaqoub Gibril (Arabic: علي يعقوب جبريل; 1 January 1964 – 14 June 2024) was a Sudanese military officer and paramilitary leader in the Rapid Support Forces (RSF). He was accused of leading military operations that caused significant human rights violations in Darfur. Gibril started his career as a tribal militia leader in Central Darfur, where he was accused of committing crimes against an ethnic group. Later, he joined the RSF and took command in Central Darfur.

In May 2024, the United States imposed sanctions on Ali Yaqoub Gibril and another RSF leader, Osman Mohamed Hamid Mohamed, for their roles in exacerbating the conflict and increasing violence in Darfur. He was placed on the Specially Designated Nationals and Blocked Persons List. The sanctions include freezing their assets in the United States and banning financial transactions with them.

Gibril played a crucial role in the RSF's military operations in Darfur, gaining control over Central Darfur and expelling the Sudanese Army from the 21st Infantry Division's command. He was also one of the senior RSF commanders who participated in the Siege of El Fasher, the capital of North Darfur, which lead to a high number of civilian casualties and exacerbating the humanitarian crisis in the region.

On 14 June 2024, Gibril was killed in action by the Sudanese Armed Forces during a failed RSF assault on El Fasher. On 26 October 2025, one year after Gibril's assassination, the RSF finally captured El Fasher as the last stronghold of the Sudanese Army that has driven out, after an 18-month siege, leaving El Fasher to become and declared a "ghost town" as part of the deadliest massacres of Darfur region.
