= Wad Habuba Revolt =

Revolt in Sudan

- Part of the aftermath of the Mahdist War
Date	April – 3 May 1908
Location	Tugur and Katfia, Gezira, Sudan
Result	British victory

Belligerents
Anglo-Egyptian Sudan	Mahdist State

Commanders and leaders
Ernest Arthur Dickinson	Abd al-Qadir Muhammad Imam Wad Habuba

Strength
2 infantry companies	41 followers

Casualties and losses
17 killed and wounded	35 killed

Location of Katfia, Sudan.

The Wad Habuba Revolt (Arabic: ثورة ود حبوبة) was an uprising in Anglo-Egyptian Sudan in mid-1908. Its causes laid in religious opposition to Christian British rule in Sudan, and a desire to restore the Mahdist State. It was led Mahdist War veteran, Abd al-Qadir Muhammad Imam Wad Habuba. It began in April, when al-Qadir took over the town of Tugur with 40 followers. From there, the rebellion spread to Katfia. Colonial authorities took the revolt very seriously and dispatched 2 infantry companies to quell the uprising. By the end of April, Katfia had been bloodlessly recaptured. On the night of 2 May, the rebels attempted to retake Katfia from the British, but were unsuccessful, with 35 of them killed in the battle, while the British forces, led by Ernest Arthur Dickinson (b. 1864, Governor of Blue Nile province 1905–1914) suffered 17 killed and wounded. By 3 May, the revolt had ended and al-Qadir had left for Omdurman on a donkey.
