= They Planted a Stone =

1953 film

- Directed by: Robin Carruthers
- Written by: Robin Carruthers
- Produced by: James Carr
- Edited by: Francis Cockburn
- Production company: World Wide Pictures
- Distributed by: Central Office of Information
- Release date: 1953
- Running time: 26 minutes
- Country: United Kingdom
- Language: English

They Planted a Stone is a 1953 British short black and white documentary film directed and written by Robin Carruthers and produced by James Carr for the Ministry of Information/Central Office of Information.

== Synopsis ==
The film portrays how dams, barrages and irrigation canals were constructed on the Nile in Sudan, to generate hydroelectricity, irrigate the desert and create such projects as the Gezira Scheme.

== Cast ==
- Gordon Henry Davies as commentator (Western voice)
- John Akar as commentator (Sudanese voice)

== Accolades ==
The film was nominated for the 1954 Academy Award for Best Documentary Short.
