= Takina, Sudan =

Village in Sudan

- Village
- Country: Sudan
- State: Gezira
- Time zone: UTC+2 (CAT)

Takina or Al-Takina is a village in Gezira State, Sudan.

== History ==
On 21 May 2024, at least 18 people were killed following two days of attacks by the Rapid Support Forces (RSF) in Takina, Gezira State. In November thousands fled from the area.
