= Al-Faw District =

Al-Faw District may refer to the following places:

- Al-Faw District, Basra Governorate, a district in the Basra Governorate in Iraq
- Al Faw District, Al Qadarif, a district in the state of Al Qadarif in Sudan
