= El Manaqil District =

El Manaqil
- District
- Country: Sudan
- State: Al Jazirah
- Seat: El Manaqil

Population
  - Total: 906,216

El Manaqil (also known as El Managil, Al Manaqil and Al Mahagil) is district of Al Jazirah state, Sudan. The capital is also called El Manaqil. The population is 906,216. It is one 7 districts in Al Jazirah.

== See also ==
- Districts of Sudan
