= University of West Kordofan =

Sudanese university

University of Western Kordofan
- جامعة غرب كردفان
- Type: Public
- Established: 1990; 36 years ago
- Location: Al-Foula, South Kordofan, Sudan
- Website: www.uwkordofan.net

The University of Western Kordofan (or Jameat Gareb Kordofan) is a university in the state of Western Kordofan, Sudan. It is based in Al-Foula, but has campuses in Khartoum, Babanusa, Balnhod and Abozbd.

== See also ==
- Education in Sudan
