= Buwaidhaa =

Town

Buwaidhaa البويضاء
- Location of Buwaidhaa in Sudan
- Coordinates: 14°51′51″N 33°17′0″E
- Country: Sudan
- State: Al Jazirah
- Time zone: UTC+2 (CAT)

Al-Buwaidhaa (Arabic: البويضاء) town is a small town in the middle part of the Sudan. It is located east of the Blue Nile in The Gazera area about 135 km South of Khartoum. The old name was "Bit-Hadeed". Originally it was situated at the Eastern bank of the Blue Nile, but for Political reasons it moved around 2 km east of the bank. The reason for that was the slavery acts imposed by The "Jehadia" who are the soldiers of the "Khalifa Abdullahi" Regime who ruled the Sudan late in the 19th century. It is part of a community who are mainly farmers growing sugar cane that supply the oldest sugar factory in Sudan with the necessary row material for producing sugar.
