= El Buweida =

Village in Sudan

- Village
- Country: Sudan
- State: Gezira
- Time zone: UTC+2 (CAT)

El Buweida is a village in Gezira State, Sudan.

== History ==
On 13 January 2024, the Sudanese Armed Forces (SAF) attacked Rapid Support Forces (RSF) positions in El Buweida.
