= Al-Fulah =

Al-Fulah الفولة
- Town
- Location in Sudan
- Coordinates: 11°43′02″N 28°20′36″E
- Country: Sudan
- State: West Kordofan
- Control: Rapid Support Forces
- Elevation: 516 m (1,692 ft)
- Time zone: UTC+02:00 (CAT)

Al-Fulah (Arabic: الفولة) is a town in West Kordofan State in Sudan and is the capital of the state. It is the home of the University of West Kordofan.

Conflict during the Second Sudanese Civil War resulted in many people being displaced.

During the Sudanese civil war (2023–present), the town was captured by the Rapid Support Forces on 20 June 2024 after a brief battle with the Sudanese Armed Forces.

The Chinese have shown an interest in developing a power station in Al-Fulah and building a 730 kilometres (450 mi) pipeline.
