= Takina, Pisidia =

Ancient town of Pisidia

Coordinates: 37°35′47″N 29°56′03″E

Takina was a town of ancient Pisidia, now an archaeological site. It may be the same town as the one called Gazena by Ptolemy and that called Tagena in the Ravenna Cosmography.

Its site is located near the modern town of Yaralli (Yarışlı) in Burdur Province, Turkey.
