= Al-Badr =

Al Badr
- Village
- Interactive map of Al Badr
- Coordinates: 21°23′33″N 39°50′26″E
- Country: Saudi Arabia
- Province: Makkah Province
- Time zone: UTC+3 (EAT)
  - Summer (DST): UTC+3 (EAT)

Al Badr is a village in Mecca Province, in western Saudi Arabia. An electrical fire at a wedding in the village killed 25 people in the courtyard of a home on October 31, 2012. 30 were injured in the blaze, which was believed to have been started by a high-voltage power line which fell, sparking, after being hit by celebratory gunfire.
