= Yousif Ibrahim Ismaeil =

Sudanese politician

Youssif Ibrahim Ezzat Ismaeil (Arabic: يوسف إبراهيم عزت إسماعيل; born c. 1974) is a Sudanese–Canadian lawyer, former rebel spokesman and political adviser who served as chief political adviser to Hemedti, commander of Sudan's Rapid Support Forces (RSF), from 2021 until his dismissal in July 2024.

== Early life and education ==
Ismaeil was born in Darfur, in the western part of Sudan, and grew up in an Baggara Arabs family that later forged personal ties with the Dagalo clan. He studied law at Al Neelain University, where he was an active participant in pro‑democracy student forums. Later, he studied conflict resolution at the University of Winnipeg.

== Career ==
=== Early activism and rebel politics ===
During the Darfur rebellion in 2003, Ismaeil joined the Sudan Liberation Movement under Abdul Wahid al-Nur and later co-founded the United Revolutionary Force Front (URFF), serving as its political secretary. He represented the Liberation and Justice Movement during the 2010 Doha peace talks, where he claimed that Qatari security allegedly detained and mistreated him for two months.

=== Political adviser to the RSF (2021–2024) ===
Hemedti appointed Ismaeil, publicly known inside Sudan by the nom‑de‑guerre Yousif Ezzat, as his chief political adviser in 2021. From the outbreak of the RSF–Sudan Armed Forces war in April 2023 he became the militia's principal civilian spokesman, giving interviews to regional and international media in which he blamed Islamist officers inside the army for the conflict.

=== Dismissal ===
On 10 July 2024 the RSF announced that Hemedti had "terminated" Ismaeil's assignment as adviser. The New Arab reported that internal disputes over the role of Hemedti's brother, Abdel Rahim Dagalo, precipitated the move. Sudan Tribune the same day noted that Ismaeil claimed to have requested his own release after the RSF reshuffled its civilian wing.

== Personal life ==
In 2003 Ismaeil immigrated to Canada as a refugee. He lived in Winnipeg, Manitoba. Ismaeil worked as a taxi driver and gas station attendant while getting his university degree. He has two children. He acquired Canadian citizenship in 2007.
