= Wad Rawah =

Village in Sudan

Wad Rawah ود راوة
- Location of Wad Rawah in Sudan
- Coordinates: 15°9′41″N 33°8′7″E
- Country: Sudan
- State: Al Jazirah

Population
  - Total: 10,348
- Time zone: UTC+2 (CAT)

Wad Rawah (Arabic: ود راوة) is a village in Gezira State, Sudan.

== History ==
During 2016 floods statewide in Gezira, it was confirmed on 22 August 2016 that 2 people died in Wad Rawah from floods. 6 house had entirely collapsed and additionally 56 houses were partially damaged. In addition, over 30 latrines collapsed.

Wad Rawah was attacked and captured by the Rapid Support Forces (RSF) on 7 October 2023, the fall of the village and other areas adjacent to it was the main reason to the RSF's offensive in the state.

On 30 December 2024, during the Sudanese Civil War, Wad Rawah was recaptured by the Sudan Shield Forces (SSF), an armed group that has goals to liberate Gezira from RSF rule. A video emerged of commander Abu Aqla Kaikal in Wad Rawah showing victory over RSF forces and arrested RSF fighters. In addition, 5 vehicles were seized. Since October 2024, the SAF has launched an offensive to recapture Gezira ever since RSF took control of most of the state.

On 1 January 2025, the RSF attacked Wad Rawah, leading to dozens of people injured and residents fleeing their homes. Seven people were killed in the attacks. The SSF withdrew, leading to the RSF retaking the village. However, the army and the Sudanese Shield Forces liberated the town exactly a month later, mainly due to the collapse of the RSF defenses in Gezira State.
