= Umm Jaris =

- Village
- Country: Sudan
- State: Gezira
- Time zone: UTC+2 (CAT)

Umm Jaris is a village in Gezira State, Sudan.

== History ==
On 15 March 2024, eight people were killed in an RSF raid on the village of Umm Jaris. Systematic looting followed the raid.
