= Al-Meiram =

District in West Kordofan State, Sudan

Al-Meiram الميرم
- Town
- Location of Al-Meiram in Sudan
- Coordinates: 10°8′46″N 27°41′20″E
- Country: Sudan
- State: West Kordofan
- Time zone: UTC+2 (CAT)

Al-Meiram (Arabic: الميرم) is a district and one of the largest towns in West Kordofan, Sudan.

== History ==
Due to the Sudanese civil war, thousands of refugees have fled the town. On 4 July 2024, the Rapid Support Forces (RSF) took control of the towns army base.
