= El Manaqil =

El Manaqil المناقل
- Location in Sudan
- Coordinates: 14°14′48″N 32°59′10″E
- Country: Sudan
- State: Al Jazirah
- District: El Manaqil
- Time zone: UTC+2 (CAT)

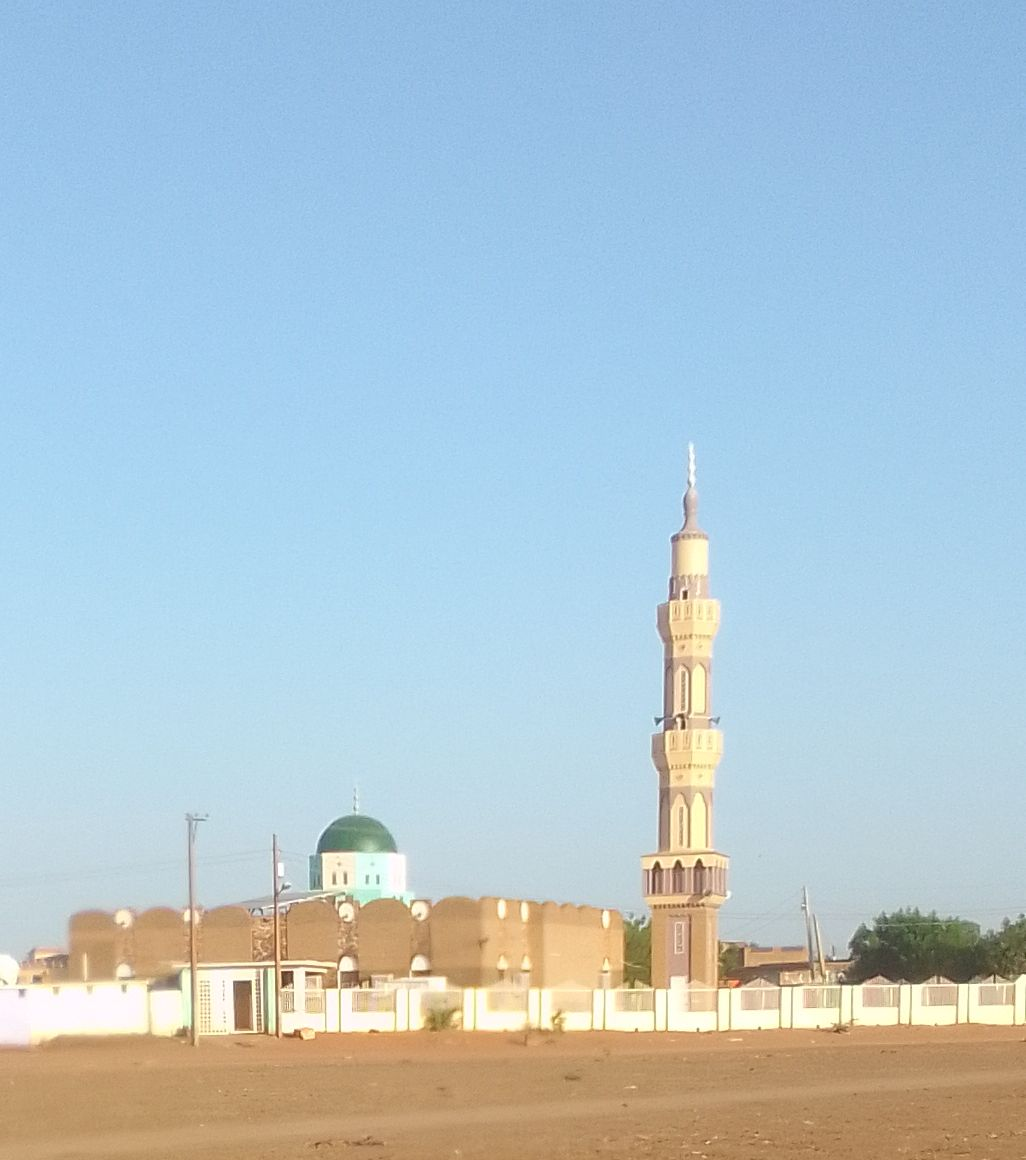
Old mosque in El Manaqil (2025)

El Manaqil (Arabic: المناقل), or Al Managil is a city in Al Jazirah state in the Sudan. Its population as of the controversial 2008 census was 99,775. Some estimates say the population is about 143,000; World Gazetteer estimated it in 2012 at 137,739. Either way, it is the second largest city in Al Jazirah state after Wad Medani. It is also the capital of the El Manaqil District (subdivision of the Sudanese states).

The town was heavily affected by the 2022 Sudan floods.

== Historical populations ==
According to the 2008 census the population was 99,775, increasing from:

- 1973 census: 15,223
- 1983 census: 36,090
- 1993 census: 65,405

== Economy ==
The area is part of the Gezira Scheme, one of the world's largest irrigation projects. The city is therefore an important retail and services center for agricultural production and food supply in Sudan. The city is a retail and services center (including cotton, wheat, sorghum).

== Transport ==
El Manaqil lies on a primary road that runs roughly east-west through the state. To the east, it leads to Wad Medani on the Blue Nile, and to the west, to Ed Dueim on the White Nile.
