= Osman Mohamed Hamid Mohamed =

Sudanese major general (born 1966)

- عثمان محمد حامد محمد
- Born: 1 January 1966 (age 60); Kadiqali, Sudan
- Military career
- Allegiance: Rapid Support Forces
- Conflicts: Sudanese civil war (2023-present)

Osman Mohamed Hamid Mohamed is a Sudanese major general working for the Rapid Support Forces (RSF). As of November 2024 he is the head of operations of the RSF.

== Life ==
Mohamed was born on 1 January 1966 in Kadiqali, Sudan. At one point Mohamed served as officer in the Sudanese Army, but later switched allegiance to the RSF. In November 2023 he was present at the Jabal Awliya military base.

On 15 May 2024, Mohamed together with late commander Ali Yaqoub Gibril was sanctioned by the United States in relation to Executive Order 14098 "Imposing Sanctions on Certain Persons Destabilizing Sudan and Undermining the Goal of a Democratic Transition" and included on the Specially Designated Nationals and Blocked Persons List. Cameron Hudson, a senior follow of the Africa Program of the Center for Strategic and International Studies called the sanctions against the two ineffectual, stating that they have no assets in the United States nor do they travel outside of Sudan.

On 8 November 2024, Mohamed together with Abdel Rahman Juma Barkalla was subjected to a travel ban and asset freeze imposed under the sanctions regime established under United Nations Security Council Resolution 1591. They were the first individuals sanctioned under the resolution since 2006 and also the first individuals who received sanctions by the United Nations since the start of the Sudanese civil war since 2023. The United Nations sanctions committee established under Resolution 1591 determined that Mohamed as major general and head of the RSF's operational planning department was an important part in operational planning of the RSF and gave speeches after significant victories by the RSF. He engaged in actions or policies that threatened the peace, security or stability of Darfur.

On 11 November 2024, Mohamed was also subjected to United Kingdom government sanctions based on the Sudan (Sanctions) (EU Exit) Regulations 2020. The European Union followed with sanctions on 16 December 2024, adding Mohamed and three other individuals to the existing list of 6 indiduals established in Regulation (EU) 2023/2147 concerning restrictive measures in view of activities undermining the stability and political transition of Sudan. Liechtenstein followed by sanctioning the same four individuals on 15 January 2025.
