= Gezira Scheme =

Irrigation project in Gezira, Sudan

Coordinates: 14°30′N 33°10′E

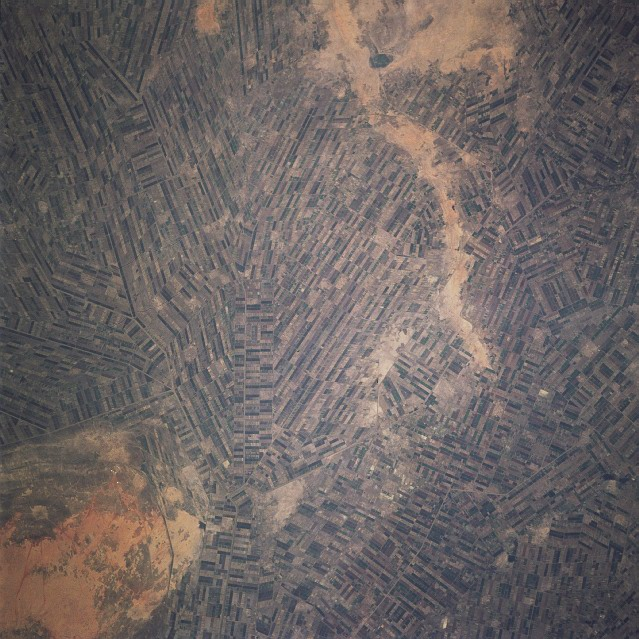
The irrigation canals of the Gezira Scheme as seen from space, 1997

The Gezira Scheme (Arabic: مشروع الجزيرة) is one of the largest irrigation projects in the world. It is centered on the Sudanese state of Gezira, just southeast of the confluence of the Blue and White Nile rivers at the city of Khartoum. The Gezira Scheme was begun by the British while the area was governed as part of Anglo-Egyptian Sudan. Water from the Blue Nile is distributed through canals and ditches to tenant farms lying between the Blue and White Nile.

The Gezira (which means "island") is particularly suited to irrigation because the soil slopes away from the Blue Nile and water therefore naturally runs through the irrigation canals by gravity. The soil has a high clay content which keeps down losses from seepage. Reginald Wingate, the British governor-general of Sudan, originally envisaged the farmers growing wheat but this was abandoned as the colonial authorities thought that a better cash crop was needed. When it was discovered that Egyptian-type long staple cotton could be grown, this was welcomed as a better choice as it would also provide a raw material for the British textile industry. Cotton was first grown in the area in 1904. After many experiments with irrigation, 24 square kilometres (9.3 sq mi) was put under cultivation in 1914.

After the lowest Nile flood for 200 years, the Sennar Dam was constructed on the Blue Nile to provide a reservoir of water. This dam was completed in 1925 and is about 3 kilometres (1.9 mi) long. The Gezira Scheme was initially financed by the Sudan Plantations Syndicate in London and later the British government guaranteed capital to develop it. The Sudan Gezira Board took over from private enterprise in 1950 and was chaired by Arthur Gaitskell.

Farmers cooperated with the Sudanese government and the Gezira Board. This network of canals and ditches was 4,300 kilometres (2,700 mi) long, and with the completion in the early 1960s of the Manaqil Extension on the western side of the Gezira Scheme, by 2008 the irrigated area covered 8,800 square kilometres (3,400 sq mi), about half the country's total land under irrigation. The main crop grown in this region was still cotton.

== See also ==
- They Planted a Stone, a 1953 documentary film about the creation of the Gezira Scheme
- 2025 Egyptian–Ethiopian crisis
