= Gezira State =

State of Sudan

Gezira ولاية الجزيرة Al Jazirah
- State
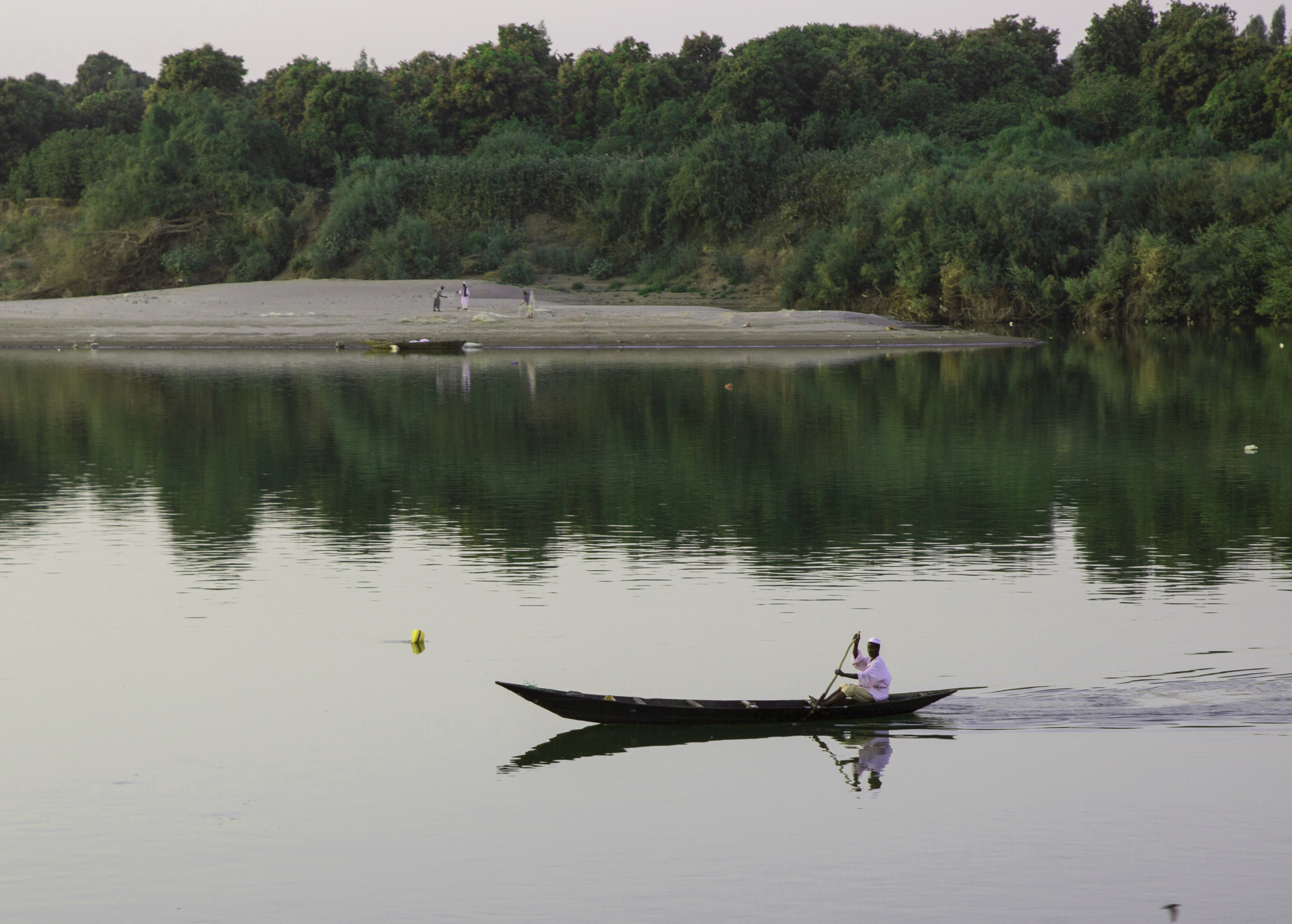
- Boatman on the Blue Nile

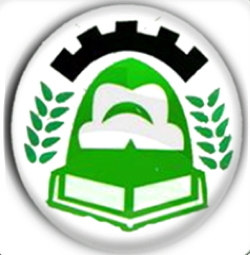
- Seal

- Location in Sudan
- Coordinates: 14°30′N 33°30′E
- Country: Sudan
- Region: Butana
- Capital: Wad Madani

Government
  - Governor: Al-Taher Ibrahim Al-Khair

Area
  - Total: 27,549 km^{2} (10,637 sq mi)

Population (2018)
  - Total: 5,096,920
  - Rank: 2nd in Sudan (16%)
  - Density: 179/km^{2} (460/sq mi)
- Time zone: UTC+2 (CAT)
- ISO 3166-2: SD-GZ
- HDI (2017): 0.547 low
- Website: http://www.gazirastate.gov.sd/

Gezira (Arabic: ولاية الجزيرة, romanized: Wilāyat Al Ǧazīra), also spelt Al Jazirah, Al Jazeera and Al Jazira, is one of the 18 states of Sudan. The state lies between the Blue Nile and the White Nile river in the east-central region of the country. The state has a population of 5,096,920 as of 2018, and an area of 27,549 km^{2}.. The state borders Khartoum to the north, Al Qadarif to the east, Sennar to the south, and White Nile to the west.

The state's capital is Wad Madani. Gezira is known as an irrigated cotton-producing state as it is a well-populated area that is suitable for agriculture. The state's name comes from the Arabic word for island.

== History ==
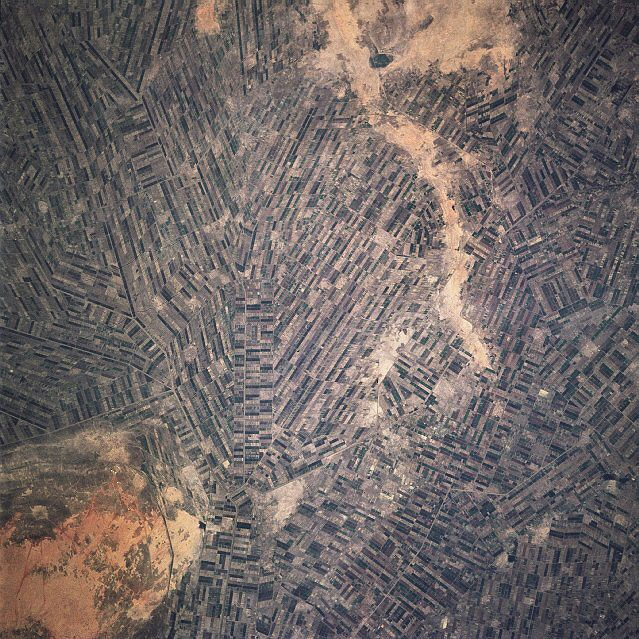
Irrigation canals of the Gezira Scheme, from space

The region was once occupied by the Kingdom of Kush. An indigenous Meroitic-speaking community lived in the Gezira. The area was at the southern end of Nubia and little is known about its ancient history and only limited archaeological work has been conducted in this area. It was part of the kingdom of Alodia for several centuries, and with that state's collapse in the early sixteenth century, it became the centre of the Funj Sultanate.It is the native region of the Abdallabi tribe who were formerly arabized Anaj, the Nubian Nobility of the kingdom of Alodia which also extended into Sennar.

Katfia in Gezira was the place where the Wad Habuba Revolt took place in April 1908. The Gezira Scheme was a program launched in 1925 to foster cotton farming. At that time the Sennar Dam and numerous irrigation canals were built. Al Jazirah became the Sudan's major agricultural region with more than 10,000 square kilometres (2.5×10^{6} acres) under cultivation.

The administrative state of Gezira was established on 1 July 1943, after the Blue Nile state was divided into three. The initial development project was semi-private, but the government nationalized it in 1950. Cotton production increased in the 1970s but by the 1990s increased wheat production has supplanted a third of the land formerly seeded with cotton.

The ongoing War in Sudan that begun in 2023 has caused a refugee crisis in the state, with an estimated 250,000 fleeing the state due to an offensive waged by the RSF on December 15, 2023 by December 18 of the same year. The RSF took control of most of the state, including Wad Madani until11, January 2025, when the Sudanese army recaptured the state leaving RSF in control of very little areas in the northwest part of the state.

In October 2024, the state was affected by the widespread massacres.

== Districts and populated places ==
The capital of Gezira is Wad Madani.

The state is divided into seven districts, namely:

- Al Kamlin
- East al Gazera
- North al Gazera
- Al Managil
- South al Gazera
- Um al Gura
- Wad Madani

Populated places include:

- Abushneib
- Al-Hasahisa
- Al Hilaliya
- Buwaidhaa
- El Manaqil
- El Medina Arab
- Rufaa
- Sherif Mukhtar
- Tanub
- Wad Al-Noora

Other villages include:

- Al-Sireha
- El Buweida
- Deim Elias
- Maknun
- Safita al-Ghunomab
- Saqiaah
- Tambul
- Umm Jaris
- Wad Rawah
- Zurqa
- Hajj Abd Allah
