= Rapid Support Forces =

Sudanese paramilitary force

- قُوَّاتْ الدّعْمْ السَّرِيعْ
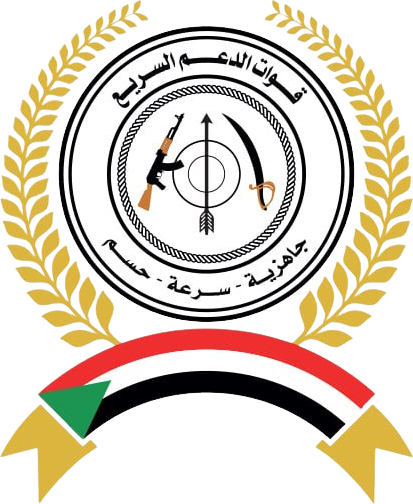
- Emblem
- Leader: Hemedti
- Deputy head: Abdul Rahim Dagalo
- Head of operations: Osman Mohamed Hamid Mohamed (since November 2024)
- Spokesperson: Yousif Ibrahim Ismaeil (2021–2024); Mohamed Mokhtar and Al-Fateh al-Qurashi (2024–present)
- Founded: August 2013
- Country: Sudan
- Allegiance: Government of Sudan (2013–2023); Government of Peace and Unity (2025–present)
- Ideology: Baggara interests Arab supremacy New Sudan (self-presented, disputed); Anti-Black racism Africanist populism (disputed); Anti-Islamism (disputed); Secularism; Tribalism
- Size: 280,000 (2023) to 450,000; 450,000 (2026) (Per Hemedti)
- Part of: National Intelligence and Security Service and Sudanese Armed Forces (until 2023)
- Conflicts: War in Darfur; Sudanese conflict in South Kordofan and Blue Nile; Yemeni civil war (2014-present); Libyan civil war (2014-2020); Sudanese revolution 2021 Sudanese coup d'état Sudanese civil war (2023–present)
- Website: rapidsupportforce.com

The Rapid Support Forces (RSF) (Note: Arabic: قُوَّاتْ الدّعْمْ السَّرِيعْ, romanized: Quwwāt ad-daʿm as-sarīʿ) are a Sudanese paramilitary force formerly operated by the Sudanese government. They originated as auxiliary force militias known as the Janjaweed used by the Sudanese government during the War in Darfur, which the government later restructured as a paramilitary organization in August 2013 under the command of Muhammad Dagalo, better known by his nom de guerre Hemedti.

Since 2023, the RSF has been fighting a civil war against the Sudanese Armed Forces (SAF) for control of Sudan, after seizing power along with the SAF in the 2021 Sudanese coup d'état. In 2025, it established a parallel government called the Government of Peace and Unity in alliance with the Sudan People's Liberation Movement–North (SPLM–N).

Its forces have been documented committing war crimes on a vast scale against members of non-Arab ethnicities in Darfur and against northern Sudanese Arabs (Ja'alin and Shaigiya) in Khartoum State and Gezira State because of their perceived support for the SAF.

The United Arab Emirates has been widely accused of secretly supplying it with financial support. The RSF has obtained many fighters and arms from neighbouring Chad, the government of which has ceased any formal relations with Sudan in an effort to quell these accusations. RSF supply lines run in part through Libya, and RSF forces have been deployed to Libya to work for the Libyan National Army. Their fighters are largely recruited as mercenaries, with funding coming from the capture of gold mines and patronage by corporate and state actors; the group has also hired out its fighters as mercenaries to fight in conflicts and assist governments outside Sudan, such as in the Yemeni civil war (2014–present). In more recent years, the RSF has allegedly recruited mercenaries from more distant regions like Colombia to fight in its war in Sudan, occasionally via American-sanctioned firms in the United Kingdom. The RSF has adopted an anti-Islamist stance in its public relations, and has claimed its new state will be a secular democracy with a bill of rights, but these postures have been met with widespread skepticism by observers given the RSF's history of repeated human rights violations.

The RSF has been accused of crimes against humanity, including the genocide of non-Arabs in Sudan, by the International Criminal Court, Human Rights Watch, Genocide Watch, and the federal government of the United States. Over the course of the civil war, their forces have killed hundreds of thousands of non-Arab civilians, used sexual violence systematically, imposed deliberate starvation, and pillaged and burned homes, hospitals, and places of worship, leading millions to flee and creating an ongoing humanitarian crisis. Fighters of the RSF have been documented gang-raping women and forcing them into marriages, recruiting child soldiers, and forcing civilians to enlist under the threat of death. During the 2019 military coup, they killed, raped, unlawfully detained, and pillaged the homes of hundreds of protesters and activists, especially during the Khartoum massacre. In October 2025, the RSF captured El Fasher, the last major SAF stronghold in Darfur, following an 18-month-long siege. The takeover triggered a massive humanitarian catastrophe characterized by widespread ethnic cleansing and mass killings. Reports indicate that tens of thousands of civilians were murdered during and after the city's fall.

== Background ==
RSF has its roots in the Janjaweed militias used by the Sudanese government in its attempts to fight the anti-government insurgency during the war in Darfur. RSF was officially formed in 2013, following a restructuring and reactivation of Janjaweed militias in order to combat rebel groups in Darfur region, South Kordofan, and the Blue Nile states, following joint attacks by Sudanese Revolutionary Front rebels in North and South Kordofan in April 2013.

=== Logo change ===
On 18 April 2023, the RSF removed the word "Quds" (Arabic: قدس), an acronym for Quwwāt ad-Daʿm as-Sarī (قوات الدعم السريع, 'Rapid Support Forces') but also Arabic for "Jerusalem", from its official logo. The revised version of the logo without the word "Quds" was used in RSF's published statements, while the previous slogan remained on the RSF's Facebook and Twitter social media accounts. Prior to the logo change, the RSF described Hamas as a terrorist movement, and Israel attempted to mediate between RSF and SAF in the current civil war in Sudan.

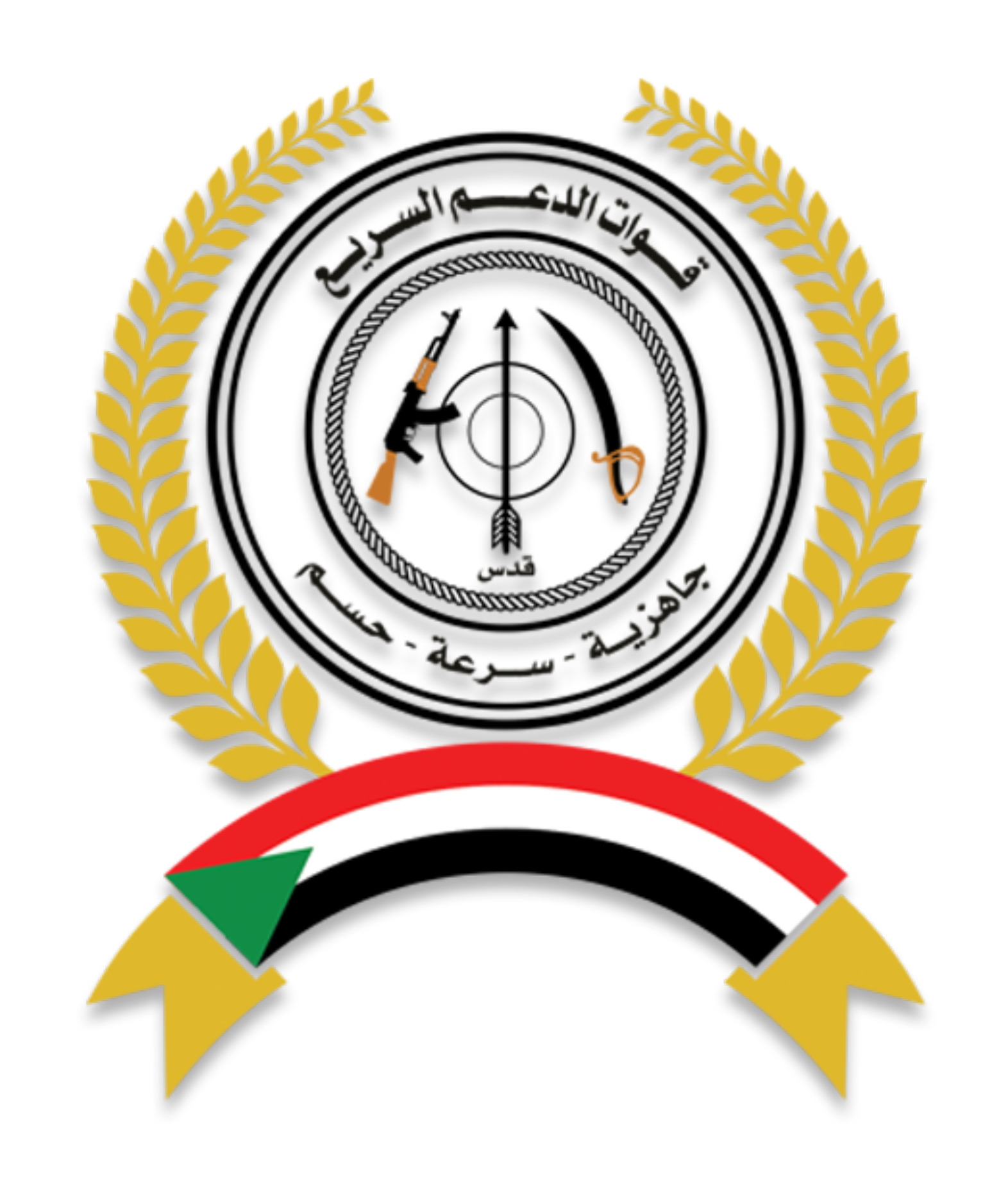
The original logo, with the word "Quds" (قدس) in the middle

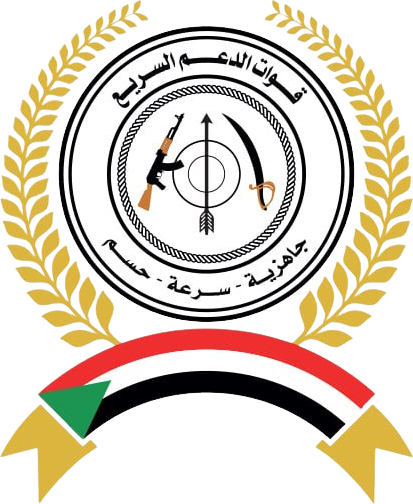
The logo used by RSF in its statements, the word "Quds" is absent from its centre

== Leadership and numbers ==
RSF is headed by Muhammad Hamdan Dagalo Musa ("Hemedti"), who has been its leader since it was created in August 2013. As of September 2019, Hemedti's brother Abdul Rahim Hamdan Dagalo is the deputy head of RSF. Osman Mohamed Hamid Mohamed has served as head of operations.

RSF was estimated by Human Rights Watch as having about 5,000–6,000 soldiers in February 2014 in Darfur. In 2016–2017, RSF had 40,000 members participating in the Yemeni civil war. In late October 2019, 10,000 had returned to Sudan. In July 2019, about 1,000 RSF soldiers were present in Libya, during the Second Libyan Civil War, supporting the Libyan National Army commanded by Khalifa Haftar.

According to Reuters, as of 2023, the paramilitary force has a personnel of over 100,000 servicemen. Many of the RSF's fighters come from Baggara Arab tribes residing in the Darfur region of Sudan, Chad or elsewhere in the "Baggara belt" of the Sahel. On 6 May, 2026 Hemedti claimed in speech that when the war began in March 2023 RSF had 143,000 soldiers and that "today, our census stands at 450,000".

== Ideology ==
The RSF's motives are characterized by academics, journalists, and local and international observers as Arab supremacist and economic. The RSF is widely characterized as violently Arab supremacist or ethno-fascist, an ideology with a preexisting history in Sudan. The journalist Nicholas Niarchos has said that "Arab supremacy is one of the RSF's animating ideas". Jérôme Tubiana, an advisor to Médecins Sans Frontières on refugee issues with a focus on Sudan and Chad, described them in 2019 as threatening to "transform Sudan from a military regime into a militia state, and replace Islamism with Arab supremacism", and Sudanese human rights advocate Amgad Fareid Eltayeb has described them as "a fascist decentralized militia". Gregory Stanton, founder of Genocide Watch, has described both them and their antecedents in the Janjaweed as having massacred hundreds of thousands of non-Arab civilians in Sudan and driven millions from their homes. In line with this, the International Criminal Court has accused the RSF of committing genocide, systematic rape and sexual violence, deliberate imposition of starvation, and other war crimes against the non-Arab population, a position echoed by U.S. Secretary of State Antony Blinken in the closing days of the Biden administration.

Yasir Zaidan, a political researcher at the University of Washington, has advocated for a view of the RSF as "ethno-mercenarist", fueled not only by "Arab supremacy ideology" but also by "land disputes, desertification, and local and regional interventions". He claims that the RSF is not an "ideology-driven insurgency, where mobilization is doctrine-first and organizational", but rather that the RSF recruits through Arab ethnic and tribal networks in the region by offering economic incentives to fight constantly, capitalizing on widespread youth unemployment, access to local gold wealth, and the interest and patronage of corporate and state actors such as the UAE. In this picture, Arab supremacism is not the driving force behind the RSF but only one factor in what makes them possible, with purely economic considerations also playing a major role.

Following the April 2019 revolution, the RSF has taken a hard line against Islamists. Hemedti claimed to have "exposed all the [Islamists'] schemes and the terrorists' plans and extremists' plans" following a crackdown in 2023. According to political professor and director of the Royal African Society Nicholas Westcott, the RSF's roots in anti-Islamism comes from a reaction of Islamist benefactors of Omar al-Bashir largely siding with Abdel Fatteh al Burhan.

Sudanese author Amgad Eltayeb has claimed that while the RSF "has strategically positioned itself as a vanguard against 'Islamists'", this is a way to conceal its war crimes under the guise of counter-terrorism. He also stated that "certain establishment pundits and diplomats have echoed this narrative, casting the RSF as a viable bulwark against an 'Islamist resurgence'". and 'a veneer that conceals its historical criminal nature, patronage networks, illicit resource extraction and foreign sponsorship", such that designation of the RSF as "anti-Islamist" is "partisan sloganeering" to conceal its actions and "not objective analysis" in his eyes. He has also characterized the RSF as "an entity that was established and constructed by the Islamist regime under General Omar al-Bashir to impose its ideology and racist 'civilisational project'" of promoting Arab supremacy and anti-African sentiment.

The researcher Jérôme Tubiana described Hemedti as leading the Janjaweed under his command to murder the mostly Muslim and non-Arab population of Darfur. According to witness testimony, "the Janjaweed rammed non-Arab men with their pickup trucks and raped women in the name of jihad and rape non-Arab civilians in the name of 'jihad' in 2006.

In February 2025, the RSF announced that it had formed an agreement with its allies to form a secular and democratic "New Sudan" government with a bill of rights. However, their stated commitment to the rule of law has also been greeted with widespread skepticism. Alan Boswell, Horn of Africa project director for the International Crisis Group, described the move as purely motivated by the RSF's desire to "increase its own legitimacy and leverage" and lamented that it was most likely to "only make the war even harder to end and Sudan even harder to piece back together". DW quoted unnamed UN officials in 2025 as making similar comments, fearing that the formation of a parallel government would only fragment Sudan further and undermine diplomatic efforts to create peace; Al Jazeera quoted a spokesman for UN secretary-general Antonio Guterres as making similar comments, expressing concern that the move would "increase the fragmentation of the country and risk making this crisis even worse". Osama Abuzaid, a political researcher affiliated with the CEDEJ in Khartoum, reported "heightened skepticism" among observers about the intentions of the RSF, citing the risk of "a facade of civilian rule without substantive democratisation" with "military-backed structures [continuing] to shape power behind the scenes". In August 2025, the UN Security Council issued a statement against the RSF's formation of a parallel government, urging the RSF and SAF to instead come to a peace agreement that could lead to "a credible, inclusive transition to a civilian-led government that can lead the country towards democratic elections" and expressing "alarm" about "reports of a renewed RSF offensive this week in El Fasher".

== Role ==
=== Migration control ===
In addition to its role in Darfur, RSF is deployed to patrol the border with Libya and round up Eritrean and Ethiopian refugees in response to the Khartoum process, which is an initiative between European and African states, including Sudan, to stem the flow of migrants to Europe.

=== Business interests ===
In November 2017, Hemedti used RSF to take over control of gold mines in the Darfur region, which led to him becoming one of the richest people in Sudan by 2019. Hemedti's brother Abdul Rahim, deputy head of RSF, heads the Al Junaid (or Al Gunade) corporation involved in gold mining and trading in Sudan.

In December 2019, a Global Witness investigation into RSF and Al Junaid argued that RSF and Al Junaid are closely linked in terms of financial transactions. Global Witness stated that "the RSF and [Al Junaid had] captured a swathe of the [Sudanese] gold industry and [were] likely using it to fund their operations". The general manager of Al Junaid stated to Thomson Reuters that there were no close links between the two.

RSF has two front companies called GSK, a Sudanese technology company, and Tradive General Trading LLC, a United Arab Emirates-based company, both controlled by Hemedti's brother Algoney Hamdan Dagalo.

In April 2023, Al Jazeera reported that RSF had sought out Western public relations firms to burnish its image, including by editing Wikipedia pages.

Former Sudanese government staffer Ahmed Ibrahim stated that during the war, the RSF aimed to "strip Sudan of its national resources" utilizing its long coast on the Red Sea.

== Foreign relations ==
The RSF's relations with other states are complex and largely veiled.

=== Chad ===
The RSF maintains facilities in Amdjarass, Chad, including an airfield and hospital, used for logistical support and medical treatment. While Chad publicly denies supporting the RSF, reports indicate the UAE uses Chad to supply weapons to the RSF, and there are accusations from Sudan that Chad provides direct aid, like weapons and mercenaries. Sudan has denied any ongoing diplomatic contacts with Chad to ease tensions over Khartoum's accusations that N'Djamena is providing support to the paramilitary RSF. Ethnic connections, particularly among Arab tribes, and poverty drive Chadian youth to join the RSF, adding to regional instability. This recruitment is a significant aspect of their relationship, often happening with or without formal government approval.

=== Ethiopia ===
Ethiopia's relationship with the RSF is complex, with some evidence pointing to individual Ethiopian involvement. In January 2024, authorities in Gedaref State, Sudan, announced the arrest of six Ethiopian women accused of serving as snipers for the RSF, with reports indicating they had been operating within the group for over a year, leveraging sniping expertise gained in Ethiopia. Ethiopia offers diplomatic backing to the RSF due to tensions with Egypt over the Grand Ethiopian Renaissance Dam, which aligns Ethiopia with actors opposing Egyptian interests. Recently, Ethiopia has hosted peace initiatives, such as the February 2025 High-Level Humanitarian Conference for the People of Sudan in Addis Ababa, organized by the UAE and attended by the African Union and IGAD, despite criticism from Sudan's government.

In February 2026, Reuters published a report that Ethiopia was hosting an RSF military training camp with financial and military support from the United Arab Emirates near the border to Sudan, marking the first direct evidence of Ethiopia's involvement in the civil war.

=== Israel ===
In January 2022, a visit by Israeli officials, including Mossad members, to Khartoum, was interpreted by SAF junior and middle ranked staff as Israeli support for the RSF. In April 2023, Israeli authorities were split between support for the RSF, which Mossad favoured, and the SAF, which the Israeli Foreign Ministry favoured. Al Monitor dated Mossad involvement in Sudan back to the 1980s, alluding to Operation Moses and Operation Joshua. According to Africa Intelligence, RSF delegations containing senior leaders such as Abdul Rahim Dagalo and his brother, Algoney Hamdan Dagalo, visited Israel twice during the Sudanese civil war. The meetings occurred in Tel Aviv in May 2025 and February 2026, where the delegations met with the Israeli foreign ministry's Africa Division and Israeli intelligence officials.

=== Libya ===
According to UN reports, the RSF's supply lines include through Libya, where it has procured landcruisers used in its military operations, and procures both oil and weapons, including artillery items and ammunition. RSF military leadership and troops have been recorded entering Libya, and have cooperated with brigades of the Libyan National Army in southern Libya, including salafist Zuwayya brigades allied to the LNA, despite the official closure of the border, ordered by the General Command of General Khalifa Haftar's LNA.

=== Kenya ===
On June 15th 2025, Bellingcat published an investigation revealing Kenyan-labelled ammunition crates found in an RSF depot near Khartoum. These crates, containing 14.5×114mm API cartridges and 82mm HE Mortar Bomb Type PP87, bore labels indicating delivery to the Kenyan Ministry of Defence in 2023–2024. Videos and images, geolocated to Salha, Omdurman, and posted between 19 and 21 May 2025, showed SAF soldiers with these crates, following the SAF's regain of control on 20 May 2025.

On June 24th 2025, the Sudanese government called on Kenya to immediately cease any form of assistance to the Rapid Support Forces. In a separate statement on 16 June, government spokesperson Mwaura stated that Sudan's allegations were "false and misleading" and that Kenyan engagement with the RSF and SAF was strictly within the framework of the IGAD peace process.

=== United Arab Emirates ===
Gold mined in Sudan was sold and sent to Dubai in the United Arab Emirates, where RSF leader Hemedti kept most of his money. In 2019, Global Witness reported that a document suggested that the RSF bought over 1,000 vehicles during the first six months of 2019 from dealers in the UAE. Most of the vehicles were Toyota pickup trucks which can be converted to technicals. Dagalo met with Sheikh Mohamed bin Zayed Al Nahyan in February 2022. Sheikh Mohamed also met Sudanese Armed Forces General Abdel Fattah Al Burhan in February 2023.

In June 2023, the UAE set a field hospital in Amdjarass, Chad with the stated goal of assisting Sudanese refugees. According to African officials, the hospital was treating wounded Rapid Support Forces fighters. According to UN and American officials, the charity which was controlled by Sheikh Mansour bin Zayed was also an effort to smuggle weapons to the RSF. The UAE denied arming any side of the conflict. According to the New York Times, US intelligence intercepted multiple calls between Dagalo and Sheikh Mansour. According to Sudanese diplomats, Hemedti's closest ally in the Emirates is Sheikh Mansour.

In November 2023, accusations from Sudanese military officials against the UAE alleged support to RSF led to a diplomatic freeze. This was followed in December 2023 with the expulsion of diplomats between the two countries. However, gold shipments flowed freely from Sudan to Dubаi, with exports facing no obstacles and operating with official approval from Sudanese army administered Port Sudan. Political tensions did not disrupt the lucrative trade. Atef Ahmed, the Secretary-General of the Goldsmiths Union, affirmed the ongoing flow of shipments to the UАЕ.

In December 2023, a group of Democratic members of the US Congress called on the UAE to cease its backing of the RSF.

In March 2024, Sudan's Permanent Representative to the UN, al-Harith Idriss wrote a letter to the United Nations Security Council requesting the condemnation of the UAE's alleged support to RSF in the war. The 78 page complaint alleged that the UAE planned and supported the RSF's aggression against Sudanese military with assistance from Chad. He also stated that supplies including 1,200 four-wheel-drive vehicles, reached to the RSF militia from the UAE. The UAE mission to the UN responded by claiming that the allegations made by al-Harith Idriss were false allegations designed to distract from the violations that are happening in Sudan and requested that the Sudanese army attend peace talks with the RSF in Jeddah which the Sudanese army has rejected to attend in May 2024.

On 17 April 2024, the US envoy to Sudan, Tom Perriello said that the US is concerned about reports that the UAE is financially supporting RSF.

In July 2024, a 41-page document sent to the UN security council claimed that four Emirati passports were recovered from a wrecked armored vehicle in Omdurman city. A source familiar with the discovery alleged to The Guardian that they belonged to UAE intelligence officers. The UAE ambassador to the UN stated that the passports belonged to a delegation from a UAE-based humanitarian group called International Charity Organization that visited Sudan in May 2022 before the war started and that no photograph proof was provided to substantiate claims that they were seized from an armored vehicle.

On 9 September 2024, HRW reported that the RSF newly obtained advanced foreign-made weapons and military equipment. On examination of photos and videos of weapons used in the conflict that were posted on social media, the rights group identified that companies registered in China, Iran, Russia, Serbia, and the UAE were associated with the weapons provided to RSF. Human Rights Watch reviewed images of crates with markings indicating they were manufactured in 2020 and initially acquired by the UAE Armed Forces in through a contract with Adasi, a subsidiary of UAE-based weapons manufacturer Edge Group. A January 2024 report by the UN Panel of Experts on Sudan deemed the UAE's alleged support to the RSF as "credible".

On 11 October 2024, Sudan wrote a letter to the UNSC, calling for an urgent action against the UAE's "continuous aggressive activities". The letter contained new proof of the UAE providing military, financial, and logistical support to the RSF. It also included images of artillery ammunition boxes, as well as Dubai-based trucks used for transporting arms and ammunition, which were later seized by the SAF. Sudan alleged the UAE of hiring mercenaries to fight for the RSF, and presented evidence indicating that the militia fighters received medical treatment at Zayed Military Hospital in Abu Dhabi. The letter urged the Security Council to condemn and hold the UAE responsible for its involvement in the conflict, claiming that the Emirati actions are against international law and the UN system.

In November 2024, Chris Van Hollen and Sara Jacobs filed a joint resolution of disapproval aimed at blocking arms sales to the UAE until it stops arming the RSF. The two U.S. lawmakers raised concerns about the government's decision to approve another weapons sale worth $1.2 billion to the UAE, while it is one of the primary foreign actors involved in intensifying the war in Sudan and warned that these arms could end up in the hands of the RSF.

On 14 November 2024, an investigation by Amnesty International revealed that Nimr, which are produced by the EDGE Group in the UAE and consolidated with the French Galix System, were being used by the RSF in Sudan. Agnès Callamard called it a violation of the UN arms embargo imposed on Sudan, and urged France to ensure that Lacroix Defense and KNDS France, which designed the Galix system, to halt the supply of such systems to the UAE.

In March 2025, top Democrat Gregory Meeks halted U.S. arms sales to the UAE due to its role in the Sudan war. He also introduced the "U.S. Engagement in Sudanese Peace Act", a bill that aimed to stop U.S. military aid to nations fueling the conflict. The bill also intended to impose sanctions on warring factions and allocating funds for a special envoy for Sudan. On 11 March, other Democrats, including Chris Van Hollen and Sara Jacobs, also reintroduced their own separate legislation– the "Stand Up for Sudan Act". It aimed to block U.S. arms sales to the UAE under the Arms Export Control Act, until it stops supporting the RSF. Citing the UAE's complicity in a genocide in Sudan, the lawmakers stated that America should not arm nations which are profiting from these atrocities.

On 23 March 2025, senior Sudanese army commander Yasir al-Atta warned that the airports of N'Djamena and Amdjarass in Chad would be considered a legitimate military target, and criticized the UAE for supplying weapons to the RSF. Sudan claimed the UAE provided RSF Chinese-made Long Wang 2 strategic drones in December 2024, which were used in attacks launched from Chad. Al-Atta claimed to take a retaliatory action against Chad President Mohamed Kaka and the "corrupt centres of influence" in South Sudan, that is, the UAE. Calling the UAE President Mohammed bin Zayed "the devil of Arabs", al-Atta said to pursue the UAE, a major supporter of the war.

In April 2025, Sudanese diaspora-led groups called for consumer boycotts, accusing the UAE of inciting the crisis in Sudan and complicity in genocide. Investigations by journalists, human rights organizations and the UN experts revealed that the UAE provided material support to the RSF in exchange for access to Sudan's resources. In the same month, the Sudanese government filed a case against the UAE at the International Court of Justice, accusing it of breaching the Genocide Convention. Nas Al Sudan, an organization leading advocacy work and mutual aid campaigns, also accused the UAE of fueling the conflict by backing the RSF. Moreover, Activists Tasneem and Rania, associated with London for Sudan and Madaniya, alleged that the UAE exports most of its gold from Sudanese mines controlled by the militia.

In August 2025, mercenaries from Colombia were identified inside the Zamzam camp in Darfur. Nearly 400 former Colombian soldiers were hired by an Emirati security company and deployed the Desert Wolves battalion to fight for the RSF militias. The Spanish-speaking mercenaries were tricked to sign up for a job to guard oil facilities, but ended up as the front liners in the war.

In late 2025, Keir Starmer's government faced intensifying parliamentary and public pressure to suspend arms sales to the UAE following reports that British-made military equipment was being diverted to the RSF in Sudan. In November 2025, Canadian Prime Minister Mark Carney faced criticism during a high-profile trade mission to the UAE following investigations that linked Canadian-made weapons to atrocities in Sudan.

=== Russia (Wagner Group) ===
According to a report by Al Araby TV, there are allegations of a connection between the Wagner Group, a Russian paramilitary organization, and Hemedti. Leaked documents and sources reportedly indicate that the Wagner Group has provided training and equipment, including armored vehicles and helicopter gunships, to Hemedti's forces. The Russian company is alleged to have provided security services during Hemedti's visit to Russia in 2018.

Hemedti's association with the Wagner Group may raise questions about his own involvement in human rights violations, particularly given his role in the crackdown on protesters during Sudan's 2019 revolution and as the founder of the Rapid Support Forces, a paramilitary group accused of committing human rights abuses in Darfur and elsewhere in Sudan. The Sudanese government has denied any connection to the Wagner Group, and the reports suggest that Hemedti may be using his position in the Sovereign Council to establish ties with the Russian company. Both Hemedti and Sudan's military leader Abdel Fattah al-Burhan had ties to the Putin regime in Russia. According to Business Insider, "The two generals helped Russian President Vladimir Putin exploit Sudan's gold resources to help buttress Russian finances against Western sanctions and fund his war in Ukraine." The Wagner group reportedly has left Sudan as of early 2024, coinciding with talks between the Russian deputy foreign minister and the leader of the Sudanese government, Abdel Fattah al-Burhan. Later the same year, Russia, along with Iran, began delivering weapons, jet components, fuel, and drones, to the Sudanese government in its effort against the RSF, allowing the military to recapture parts of the capital, Khartoum, from the RSF.

== History ==
=== International civil wars ===
==== War in Darfur ====
During the war in Darfur, in 2014 and 2015, RSF "repeatedly attacked villages, burned and looted homes, beating, raping and executing villagers", aided by air and ground support from the Sudanese Armed Forces. RSF executions and rapes typically took place in villages after rebels had left. The attacks were systematic enough to qualify as crimes against humanity according to the Human Rights Watch.

==== Yemeni civil war ====
RSF has participated in the Yemeni civil war, supporting the pro-Hadi forces. RSF and other Sudanese security forces, participating in the Saudi Arabian-led intervention in Yemen alongside Saudi and Emirati forces, have killed civilians and destroyed infrastructure, for which they are suspected of war crimes by the Human Rights Watch. Saudi Arabia organised and financed this involvement, which brought financial resources to the RSF.

In 2016–2017, RSF had 40,000 members participating in the Yemeni civil war. In October 2019, 10,000 members had returned to Sudan.

The RSF's activities in Yemen were multifaceted, focusing on military operations within the coalition's strategy. They supported efforts to create a buffer zone in northern Yemen, as reported by Jamestown Foundation. They were a lead force in capturing northwestern provinces, particularly Hajjah governorate, and played a role in the strategic capture of Midi port in January 2017, believed to be a Houthi supply hub via maritime lines maintained by Iran's Islamic Revolutionary Guard Corps. Their deployment included ground operations, which faced tactical difficulties due to Yemen's mountainous terrain.

==== Second Libyan civil war ====
During the 2019 Western Libya offensive phase of the Second Libyan civil war, in July 2019, about 1,000 RSF soldiers were present in Libya, supporting the Libyan National Army (LNA) commanded by Khalifa Haftar and based in Tobruk, which was fighting against the internationally recognised Government of National Accord (GNA) based in Tripoli.

=== Sudanese civil war (2023–present) ===
Map of Sudanese civil war (2023–present) Controlled by Sudanese Armed Forces and allies Controlled by Rapid Support Forces Controlled by SPLM-N (al-Hilu) Controlled by allied Rapid Support Forces and SPLM-N (al-Hilu) Controlled by SLM (al-Nur)

On 15 April 2023, fighting between the Sudanese Armed Forces and RSF broke out after RSF mobilised in cities across Sudan. Fighting was reported at the presidential palace and army headquarters.

The conflict resulted in RSF being designated as a rebel group by the Sudanese Armed Forces. On the day of the clashes, which included the Battle of Khartoum, both sides claimed control over Khartoum and Merowe airports and other sites.

On 17 April 2023, the United States Secretary of State Antony Blinken and RSF leader Hemedti held talks, and the latter agreed to a 24-hour armistice beginning on 18 April 2023 "to ensure the safe passage of civilians and the evacuation of the wounded".

Another 72-hour nationwide ceasefire was announced to begin at midnight on 24 April 2023. The United States and Saudi Arabia had mediated the truce on humanitarian grounds. The fighting had caused the deaths of more than 500 people by 25 April 2023, and thousands were injured. The Rapid Support Forces were supported by the Libyan militia leader Khalifa Haftar and the United Arab Emirates. Footage of thermobaric shells captured by the Sudanese military suggested that the weapons were supplied by the United Arab Emirates; Egypt had sent military support to the Sudanese army. On 1 July 2024, the RSF took full control of Singa. This surge in violence caused many civilians to flee towards Gedaref in eastern Sudan. On 30 June 2024, the army also targeted 17th Infantry Division headquarters, General Intelligence Service (GIS) buildings, and the guesthouse. The RSF's dominance extended over the entire city, including the deserted headquarters of the Sudanese Army's 65th Brigade. The RSF also secured the Blue Nile Bridge, hinting at a possible expansion towards al-Dinder.

The RSF has tried to re-employ officials from the pre-war civilian administration. But many civil servants have escaped both to avoid the fighting and having to work with RSF military personnel. This lack of effective RSF administration, alongside the complexity of Sudanese ethnic tensions and alliances shaped by the fighting, have seriously undermined Hemedti's ambition to transcend his warlord persona.

A report by The Wall Street Journal revealed that mercenaries were becoming a tool for foreign actors like the UAE and Egypt for attaining a strategic advantage in the Sudan war. In November 2024, Colombian fighters were seized from Darfur and were later identified as recruits of an Abu Dhabi-based firm Global Security Services Group (GSSG). The military contractors were hired through a Colombia-registered recruitment firm, International Services Agency (A4SI). They were first taken to the UAE, then to Benghazi in Libya, and were finally deployed to Sudan. The Colombian recruits were "duped" to support the UAE's efforts in bolstering RSF's position in the war.

In February 2025, RSF and its allies signed a charter in Nairobi, Kenya, to form a parallel "Government of Peace and Unity" to govern RSF-controlled areas, potentially splitting Sudan further. On 21 March, SAF retook the presidential palace in Khartoum, which now stands as a symbolic victory against the RSF. On 26 March, SAF declared Khartoum "free" from RSF, completing the drive-out after nearly two years of occupation.

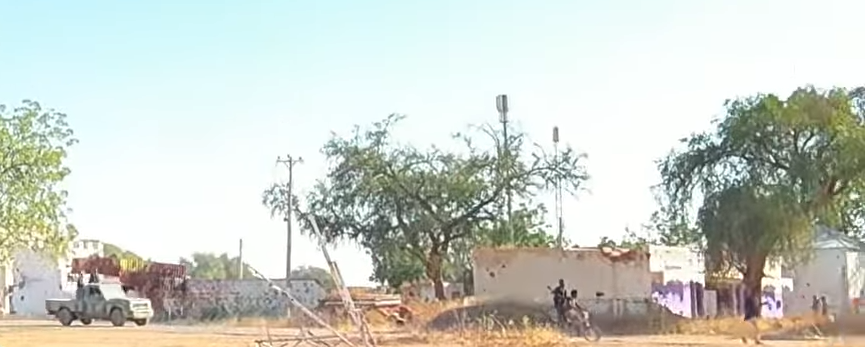
RSF forces in El Fasher on 28 October

The RSF seized control of El Fasher in October 2025. The group conducted mass killings and massacres of civilians, known as the El Fasher massacre.

Following a widespread international outcry, the RSF claimed in late October 2025 to have arrested a notorious figure, Issa Abu Lulu a.k.a. Brig. Gen. Al-Fateh Abdullah Idris, who has been featured in videos publicly shared by the RSF killing civilians extrajudicially and on the basis of their tribal origin, including in El Fasher. The RSF denied that he was an official member of the group and alleged instead that he "leads a group fighting alongside us", promising "accountability" for his actions. Simultaneously, Hemedti announced the formation of an "investigation committee" to look into crimes committed by RSF troops, saying as well that "there will be accountability". Sudanese investigative journalist Eiad Husham reported that "scepticism runs deep, even after Abu Lulu's arrest", as "the RSF's repeated pattern of distancing itself from field commanders implicated in atrocities has become a familiar tactic", allowing them to burnish their image while maintaining ties with local militias in practice.

== Human rights violations ==
=== Khartoum massacre ===
During the dispersing of the peaceful sit-in in Khartoum, the Rapid Support Forces raped dozens of women according to the testimonies of the victims.

RSF killed 100 protestors, injured 500, raped women and pillaged homes in the Khartoum massacre on 3 June 2019 during the 2018–19 Sudanese protests. During the first day of Eid al-Fitr in Sudan, in June 2019, there were reports that RSF tied bricks of cement to the bodies of dead protestors to make them sink to the bottom of the Nile and never be found. The Central Committee of Medical Doctors stated that more than 100 people had been killed. On 6 June 2019, Kumi Naidoo, the head of Amnesty International, called for the "[immediate withdrawal of] all members of the Rapid Support Forces from policing and law enforcement anywhere in Sudan and especially in Khartoum".

=== Al-Dalij ===
The Central Committee of Sudanese Doctors reported Janjaweed/RSF shooting dead nine people in the market of the village al-Dalij (or al-Delig) in Central Darfur on 10 or 11/12 June 2019. The massacre and the burning down of the market were interpreted by locals as a response to civil disobedience.

=== Violations during the Yemeni civil war ===
In addition to the killings in Khartoum, other human rights violations during the 2018–19 crisis have been attributed to the RSF, including the rape of 70 male and female protesters during the Khartoum massacre and the following days; the targeting of peaceful sit-ins; and attacks on hospitals.

In December 2018, a New York Times report revealed the fact that during the Yemeni civil war, children were recruited and sent to fight in the frontline by the militia.

=== Violations during the 2023 Sudan conflict ===
During the 2023 Sudan conflict, the militia members have reportedly committed crimes such as looting of houses and evicting their residents, sexual violence, and repurposing churches and hospitals as shields. In a report released on 28 July 2024, Human Rights Watch documented widespread acts of sexual violence, including gang rape and forced marriages, committed by RSF in Khartoum since the onset of the conflict. The 89-page report, titled "Khartoum is Not Safe for Women", highlighted the severe impact on women and girls. Both the RSF and SAF obstructed humanitarian aid, exacerbating the survivors' plight. Despite the clear evidence of war crimes and crimes against humanity, neither party took meaningful steps to prevent or investigate these abuses. Human Rights Watch called for urgent international intervention to protect civilians, support survivors, and hold perpetrators accountable. The RSF has been trying to rehabilitate its image as a "killer militia" by disciplining some of its fighters and building civil administrations. Few observers take these efforts seriously as atrocities committed by its fighters are so widely documented.

In July 2023, authorities reported at least 88 cases of sexual assault on women across the country, most of them blamed on the RSF. Non-governmental organizations estimated that the figure could possibly reach 4,400.

On 12 November 2024, the U.S. sanctioned RSF commander in East Darfur Abdel Rahman Jumma over serious human rights violations, including allegations of harm to civilians in conflict, sexual violence, and ethnically motivated attacks.

On 7 January 2025, the U.S. government officially accused Sudan's Rapid Support Forces (RSF) of committing genocide and imposed sanctions on the group's leader, Hemedti. These sanctions, which include asset freezes and a travel ban, are intended to hold the RSF accountable for widespread violence, including ethnic killings, rape, and forced displacement. Additionally, seven RSF-owned companies based in the United Arab Emirates were also sanctioned.

==== Capture of El Fasher ====
After an 18-month siege, in October 2025, the RSF captured the city of El Fasher, the largest city in the Darfur region. Reports contained accounts of massacres of unarmed, non-Arab civilian communities and other large-scale atrocities. Systematic killings were committed, the RSF tortured and shot civilians who attempted to leave. In October, they committed systematic massacres in a major hospital. Sudan Doctors Network and international researchers say RSF fighters killed unarmed people because of their ethnicity, carried out door-to-door raids and executions, and committed acts of sexual violence against women and girls. A report which contained satellite imagery of El Fasher which was analyzed by Yale University's Humanitarian Research Lab (HRL) stated that swaths of civilians had been killed in the Daraja Oula area. The HRL believes that "the actions by [the] RSF ... may be consistent with war crimes and crimes against humanity (CAH) and may rise to the level of genocide."

RSF fighters reportedly executed at least 460 patients and staff inside the city's last functioning hospital. According to initial estimates, the RSF takeover has resulted in over 2,000 civilian deaths, sparking widespread ethnic violence, and deepening the humanitarian crisis. Arab states and human rights groups have condemned these actions. Analysis of satellite imagery suggested that the RSF disposed of tens of thousands of bodies through burial and incineration to cover up mass killings. As of December 2025, some tracking estimates place the total deaths from the El Fasher massacre between 60,000 and 68,000+.

=== Forced recruitment ===
Since the outbreak of the war in April 2023, the RSF has intensified forced recruitment campaigns in areas under its control, especially in Darfur, Kordofan, and Gezira State, and has often targeted men and boys through abductions, coercion, and threats. Reports have described people being taken from homes, villages, and camps for internally displaced persons and forced into combat or support roles under threat of execution or torture. Those who refused recruitment or tried to escape faced killings, torture, enforced disappearance, and other reprisals, while communities associated with them were also subjected to looting, torching, sexual violence, and forced displacement. Young males, displaced persons, and people in RSF-held areas were considered especially vulnerable.

=== Other violations ===
According to multiple media reports, the RSF abused immigrants who are crossing Sudan to Europe. A report by Human Rights Watch revealed the militia unlawfully detained dozens of citizens including political activists.

== Ranks ==
Commissioned officer ranks

Rank group	General / flag officers				Senior officers			Junior officers
Sudanese Rapid Support Forces
Sudanese Rapid Support Forces	فريق أول; Fariq 'awal	فريق; Fariq	لواء; Liwa	عميد; Amid	عقيد; Aqid	مقدم; Muqaddam	رائد; Ra'id	نقيب; Naqib	ملازم أول; Mulazim awwal	ملازم; Mulazim

== See also ==
- Territory of the Rapid Support Forces
- War crimes during the Sudanese civil war (2023–present)
