= Watan =

Watan (Arabic: وطن) or Al-Watan with the definite article al- (Arabic: الوطن), meaning homeland, heimat, country, or nation, may refer to:

== Politics ==
Al-Watan means 'national' in Arabic and in Persian (وطن), the articles titles on Wikipedia for political parties are sometimes translated as 'national', sometimes as 'al-watan', 'al-watani' or 'watani'. Wataniyya may also refer to State-based ('patriotic') nationalism (see Egyptian nationalism), as opposed to Qawmiyya, ethnic-based Arab nationalism.

- Watani Party or Al-Watani Party, a former Egyptian party
- Homeland Party (Libya), or Al-Watan Party, a Libyan party
- National Party (Syria), or Al-Watani Party, a former Syrian party
- Al-Watan Party (Tunisia), or Al-Watan Party, a centrist party in Tunisia
- Otan (political party), a Kazakh political party
- Watan Party of Afghanistan, an Afghan political party
- Vatan Party, a former Iranian party
- Patriotic Party (Turkey), a Turkish political party

== Publications ==
It is commonly used as the name of Arabic-language newspapers, as well as newspapers in other languages that have borrowed the word:

- Watan News, online Jordanian news agency
- Alwatan (Oman), an Arabic daily newspaper published in Oman
- Al-Watan (Bahrain), an Arabic daily newspaper published in Bahrain
- Al-Watan (Kuwait), a Kuwaiti Arabic-language defunct daily published by the Al Watan publishing house
- Al-Watan Daily, a daily English-language newspaper published in Kuwait
- Al-Watan (Qatar), a daily morning Arabic-language political newspaper based in Doha, Qatar
- Al-Watan (Syria), a Syrian Arabic-language daily newspaper published in Syria
- Al-Watwan (Comoros), a Comorian French-language and Comorian Arabic-language daily newspaper published in Moroni, Comoros
- Al-Watan (Saudi Arabia), a daily newspaper in Saudi Arabia
- El Watan News, an Egyptian daily news portal published online by Future Publishing, Distribution, and Press.
- El Watan, an Algerian French-language newspaper
- Nawai Watan, a Balochi newspaper in Pakistan
- Vatan (1923 newspaper), Turkish newspaper published 1923–1925, and 1940–1978
- Vatan (2002 newspaper), Turkish newspaper published 2002–2018

== Places ==
- Al-Watan, San‘a’, a village in western central Yemen
- Qasr Al Watan, the United Arab Emirates presidential palace and seat of government.

== Other uses ==
- Watan (film), a 1938 Indian film
- Watan Group, a telecommunications and security company in Afghanistan
- Pader Watan, a military unit in the Soviet-backed Democratic Republic of Afghanistan
- Watan Order, the highest national order of Turkmenistan
- Watan, a historical land allotment in India owned by a Watandar
- Ardulfurataini (national anthem), national anthem of Iraq from 1981 to 2003

== See also ==
- Vatan (disambiguation)
- Otan (disambiguation)
