= NATO (disambiguation) =

NATO is the North Atlantic Treaty Organization, an intergovernmental military alliance.

NATO, nato, or Nato may also refer to:

== Arts and entertainment ==
- NATO (album), an album by Laibach
- NATO: Operational Combat in Europe in the 1970s, a board wargame released in 1973
- NATO Division Commander, a 1979 board wargame

== Science and technology ==
- Nato, member tree species of the genus Mora
  - Nato wood
- .nato, a deleted internet top level domain

== People ==
- n.A.T.o. (singer) (born 1979), Russian singer
- Norman Nato (born 1992), French professional racing driver
- Ofentse Nato (born 1989), Botswana footballer

== Other uses ==
- National Association of Theatre Owners, former name of the American association Cinema United
- National Association of Tenants Organisations, a historic Irish tenants union
- NATO Phonic Alphabet

== See also ==
- Natto (disambiguation)
- Neato (disambiguation)
- Otan (disambiguation)
- 5.56×45mm NATO, a standard rifle round
- 7.62×51mm NATO, a standard rifle round
- nato.0+55+3d, software for realtime video and graphics
- NATO phonetic alphabet, a spelling alphabet
- NATO reporting name, a codename for non-NATO military equipment
- NATO Stock Number, a coding system for NATO military supply equipment
- NATOUSA (North African Theater of Operations)
- North American Alternative Trade Organization (NAATO), former name of the Fair Trade Federation
- Nattō, a Japanese food from fermented soybeans
