= List of belligerents during the Sudanese Civil War (2023–present) =

The Sudanese Civil War has seen a number of different factions fighting under the main belligerents of the war, the Sudanese Armed Forces (SAF) and the Rapid Support Forces (RSF). The number of allied militias active in the conflict is estimated to be around 150. These militias comprise mainly of a collection of military and paramilitary forces, tribal militias, Islamist brigades, community defense groups, criminal gangs, and foreign mercenaries. Combined with the internal forces also Foreign involvement has also been a vital part of the war with numerous countries being involved directly in the civil war.

== Sudanese Armed Forces and Allies ==
=== Sudanese Armed Forces ===
Sudanese Armed Forces led by general Abdel Fattah al-Burhan has been the main fighting forces against the RSF during the civil war The SAF is made up of the Land Force, Sudanese Navy, Sudanese Air Force, SAF Military Intelligence, and Border Guards, and the Central Reserve Forces (CRP), also known as Abu Tira. Before the current civil war SAF troops numbered around 200,000 personnel according to the CIA. The number of the forces had increased to 300,000 personnel in 2024 according to Al Jazeera. (Note: Does not count the reserve forces and paramilitaries)

==== Central Reserve Forces ====
Central Reserve Forces (CRF) also known as Abu Tira is a militarised police unit under the SAF. CRF was first formed around 1974 and operate as an auxiliary force for the National Intelligence and Security Services (NISS). During the Sudanese Civil War CRF announced to deploy troops in Khartoum on the side of the SAF.

==== Sudan Shield Forces ====
Sudan Shield Forces (SSF) is a paramilitary created by Abu Aqla Kaikal which at the begginging of the civil war was fighting for the RSF but defected to SAF in October 2024. In 2023 the forces numbered around 35,000 fighters. The SSF has participated in the First and Second battle of Wad Manadi. After the second battle of Wad Manadi the SSF was implicated in attacks against civilians, especially of the Kanabi ethnic group.

==== Popular Resistance ====
Popular Resistance also known as Mustafareen is a coalition of armed factions fighting on the side of the SAF against the RSF. The faction was formed in June 2023 when al-Burhan, initiated a mass mobilisation dubbed as the Popular Resistance. Although Azhari al-Mubarak Muhammad was appointed the leader of Popular Recistance in March 2024, the armed factions continue to operate mostly without any formal structures.

===== Al-Bara' ibn Malik Battalion =====
Al-Bara' ibn Malik Battalion is a Sudanese Islamist militia fighting under the Popular Resistance coalition. The Battalion was estimated to be around 20,000 troops in 2025, and its led by commander Almusbah Abuzaid. Al-Bara' ibn Malik Battalion has been accused of various war crime including killing 70 civilians in Khartoum North during the Battle of Khartoum. The Battalion has also been accused of involvement with the Gezira State Canal killings alongside the Sudan Shield Forces.

=== SPLM–N (Agar) ===
SPLM-N (Agar) is faction of the SPLM-N headed by Malik Agar. The faction is based in the Blue Nile State and supports the SAF in the civil war.

=== SLM-Tambour ===
SLM-Tambour faction of the Sudanese Liberation Movement formed by Mustafa Tambour. In July 2023 Tambour announced that his forces had joined with the SAF to fight against he RSF. During fighting in Zalingei, SLM-Tambour claimed to have killed 68 RSF soldiers. On 10 June 2024, group of fighters fighting under SLM-Tambour announced that they would be defecting to fight for the RSF. The group led by Colonel Ahmed Haroun accused Tambour of "contradicting the principles and doctrines of the movement, which initially rebelled against the SAF and its transgressions."

=== Darfur Joint Protection Force ===
Darfur Joint Protection Force (DJPF) was formed out of the signatories to the Juba Peace Agreement. The groups included in DJPF are SLM-Minawi, the Justice and Equality Movement, the Sudanese Alliance, and the Gathering of Sudan Liberation Forces. DJPF is reportedly neutral but in November 2023 SLM-Minnawi and the Justice and Equality Movement announced that they would be fighting on the side of Sudan.

=== Tamazuj ===
Tamazuj also known as the Third Front is a rebel group fighting in the regions of Darfur and Kordofan. The group was first formed in 2020 in the lead up to the signing of Juba Peace Agreement of which Tamazuj was one of the sigantories. In August 2023, Tamazuj, led by Ali Qurashi, declared its support for the RSF. In August 2025 Qurashi announced that Tamazuj was aligned with the SAF and accused the RSF of forming a tribal government.

== Rapid Support Forces and Allies ==
=== Rapid Support Forces ===
Rapid Support Forces (RSF) led by Mohammed Hamdan Dagalo are the main belligerent against the SAF in the Sudanese Civil War. RSF was formed out of the Janjaweed fighters in 2013. The Sudanese Civil War began in Khartoum in April 2023 and the fighting started between the RSF and the SAF. The RSF was around 100,000 troops in 2023 when the war began but has since grown to 450 000 troops in 2026 according to Dagalo. RSF has been accused of various war crimes including genocide during the capture of El Fasher and the fall of El Geneina

=== SPLM–N (al-Hilu) ===
The SPLM-N (al-Hilu) is a faction of the SPLM-N led by Abdelaziz al-Hilu. SPLM-N al-Hilu operates in South Kordofan and Blue Nile State on the side of the RSF, controlling the area around Kauda and the city of Kurmuk.

=== SLM-El Hadi ===
SLM-El Hadi previously known as SLM-TC (Transitional Council) is a faction of the Sudanese Liberation Movement led by El-Hadi Idris. In November 2023 El-Hadi was removed from the Sudanese Sovereignty Council for refusing to side with the SAF. In July 2025 El-Hadi Idris was appointed a member of the presidential council of RSF-led Government of Peace and Unity

=== Libyan National Army ===
Libyan National Army, under the command of Khalifa Haftar, have fought alongside RSF with launching cross border attacks against the SAF and flying military supplies to the RSF before the outbreak of hostilities in April 2023.

=== Coalition of Patriots for Change ===
Central African Republic (CAR) rebel group Coalition of Patriots for Change (FPRC) has claimed to be involved in the fighting in Sudan on the side of RSF. In August 2023, the leader of FPRC Noureddine Adam was injured fighting in Nyala against the SAF.

=== Desert Wolves ===
The Desert Wolves are private military contractors formed out of retired Colombian military personnel fighting alongside the RSF. According to the Noticias Caracol news program, the battalion was recruited by private military companies in the United Arab Emirates from which they were sent to fight in Sudan. Desert Wolves consists of four companies comprising between 300 and 400 men in total.

== Opposing forces during the civil war ==
(Sudan) Sudanese Armed Forces and allies	Rapid Support Forces and allies
Transitional Sovereignty Council: Sudanese Armed Forces: Sudanese Army; 9th Airborne Division; 18th Infantry Division; Central Reserve Forces; Homeland Shield Forces; Sudanese Air Force; Sudanese Navy; Popular Defence Forces; Al-Bunyan Al-Marsous Battalion; Popular Resistance of Sudan; Al-Bara' ibn Malik Battalion; Resilience Battalion; Angry Without Borders; Popular Security group; The Homeland Entity; Al-Matmoura Battalion; Allied militias: Joint Force (from Nov. 2023); SLM-Minni Minawi; Justice and Equality Movement; Gathering of the Sudan Liberation Forces (GSLF-Janna); The Sudan Liberation Movement/Army -Transitional Council; Sudan Liberation Movement/Army-Tambour (from Jul. 2023); The Higher Committee for Mobilization and Popular Resistance in South Darfur State; Sudan People's Liberation Movement–North (Agar); Sudanese National Alliance; Zaghawa militias; Zaghawa Council; Masalit militias; Sudanese Alliance Forces; Tamazuj (from Aug. 2025); The National Movement for Justice and Development; the Eastern Battalion Forces; Eastern Sudan National Movement; Beja Congress; Sudan Liberation Forces; "Al-Qubba" Militia; “Al-Savana” Militia; Sudanese Awakening Revolutionary Council (from Feb. 2026); Communal Militias: Popular Mobilisation Battalions; The Middle Call; Kawahala Militia; Kababish Militias; Reserve Forces Eagles Brigade; Kawahla; Foreign Fighters: Egypt (from 2025); Socialist Party Without Borders; Eastern Cohort	Government of Peace and Unity (from Apr. 2025): Rapid Support Forces; Earthquake Division; SLM-el Hadi (from Jul. 2025); SPLM–N (al-Hilu) (from Jul. 2025); Otoro Ethnic Militia; SPLM-N (Toka); Allied militias: Allied Arab militias; Janjaweed; South Sudan People's Movement/Army (SSPM/A); Descendants of the Blue Sultanate; Justice and Equality Movement (JEM-Sandal); Gathering of the Sudan Liberation Forces (GSLF-Hajar); Sudan Liberation Movement - Second Revolution; The Braves of Kordofan; Communal Militias: Al Jazirah Communal Militia; Abbas Jabal Moon; Foreign Fighters: Government of National Stability (LNA); (Central African Republic) CPC (from Aug. 2023); Wagner Group (until early 2024); Desert Wolves; South Sudanese mercenaries; SPLM-IO (Oyet Faction); Al Silaa Brigade; Front for Change and Concord in Chad
