= Al-Imam =

Malay-language Islamic reformist magazine (1906–1908)

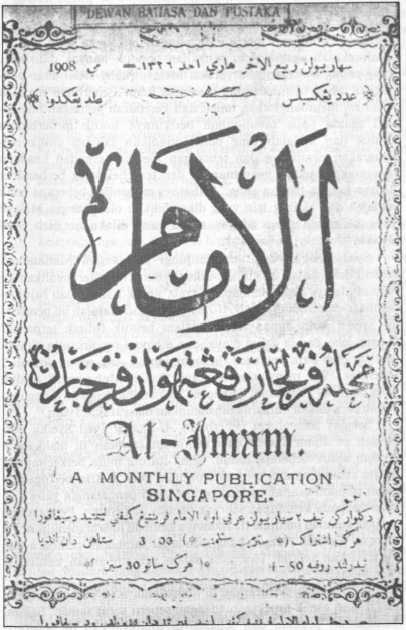
Title page of the magazine al-Imām from May 1908 with the subtitle Majallah perlajaran, pengetahuan, perkhabaran ("Journal for Education, Science and Information")

al-Imām (الإمام; 'The Leader' or 'The Guide') was a Malay monthly magazine written in Jawi script with an Islamic orientation. Published in Singapore from July 1906 to December 1908, it was the first periodical in Southeast Asia to adopt and disseminate the ideas of the Cairo-based Islamic reformists Muhammad Abduh and Rashid Rida.

The magazine was founded by Tahir Jalaluddin (1869–1956) and Sayyid Shaykh al-Hadi (1867–1934). It carried the subtitle Majallah perlajaran, pengetahuan, perkhabaran ("Magazine for Education, Knowledge, and Information") and was published at the beginning of each Hijri month. Its content followed the model of Rashid Rida's journal, al-Manār. A total of 31 issues were published. During its existence, al-Imām was the only Malay-language journal of its kind, making it highly significant for Malays and Malay-speaking Muslims in the region. It served as the mouthpiece for the Malay modernists known as the Kaum Muda.

== Name ==
The name of the magazine refers to Quranic statements where the term "Imam" is used to describe foundational texts and human role models. The title on each issue's cover was surrounded by quotes from two Quranic verses containing the word: "And everything We have recorded in a clear Book (imām mubīn)" (Surah 36:12) and "And make us an example (imām) for the righteous" (Surah 25:74).

== Content ==
According to Azyumardi Azra, al-Imām was one of the most important channels for transmitting the ideas of al-Manār to the Malay-Indonesian world. It closely resembled al-Manār in appearance and frequently referenced or excerpted its content. However, it also drew from other Arabic periodicals. The vocabulary used by its authors was heavily influenced by Arabic, which occasionally made it difficult for readers to understand certain terms.

=== Religious Reform ===
Historian William Roff noted that al-Imām's primary interest was religion rather than direct social or political change. It called upon the Muslim community to abandon impermissible innovations. Traditional forms of Islam mixed with Adat customs were to be purified, and the Ulama who supported such hybrid practices were urged to return to "pure" Islam. A programmatic article from June 1908 declared that religious reform (islaḥ al-dini) was the magazine's Qibla, the Quran its Imam, and the Sunni school of thought its Madhhab.

The magazine argued that the primary cause for the decline of Muslim peoples compared to their former glory was their failure—out of ignorance—to follow God's commandments as conveyed by the Prophet Muhammad. Another central theme was the changing times, which required the Ummah to adapt to new needs. It included a Fatwa section (Malay: Soal dan Jawab), which emphasized the necessity of Ijtihad (independent interpretation of the Quran and Hadith) while warning against Taqlid (blind imitation of established tradition).

=== Education ===
Regarding education, the magazine advocated for the inclusion of secular subjects in traditional, purely religious curricula. It closely followed the development of Madrasat al-Iqbal al-Islamiya, the first Arabic school in Singapore, founded in February 1908 by members of the editorial circle. The school taught subjects like geography, history, and mathematics. However, the magazine expressed strong reservations about women's education, viewing it as a potential threat to the family structure. It feared that if girls attended schools like those in Western countries, they might lose their "feminine character" and seek to avoid marriage and motherhood.

=== Malay Society and Rulers ===
al-Imām was self-critical of Malay society, censuring what it described as "backwardness," "laziness," and an inability to cooperate for the common good. It appealed to the Malay rulers and nobility (raja-raja dan orang-orang besar) to support social and economic changes.

Politically, the magazine was critical of the Sultan of Terengganu, describing his rule as a despotism. Conversely, it expressed admiration for Ibrahim Masyhur, the Sultan of Johor, and the Sultan of Riau-Lingga. It compared the former Sultan of Johor, Abu Bakar, to Muhammad Ali of Egypt and the Ottoman Sultan.

=== Anti-Colonialism ===
The magazine also addressed the effects of colonialism. One issue contained the cry: "O people of the Orient! Should we not feel ashamed... that our nation has been plunged into the sea of humiliation by a foreign nation?" Articles criticized Europeans for leading Oriental peoples into "slavery" and for showing disrespect to local rulers. To illustrate the humiliation of the colonized, the authors frequently used animal metaphors, describing a colonized country's relationship to the colonial power as "like a beast to its master" or "like a riding horse." A key concept in the magazine was love for the homeland, using the Arabic term Watan.

== Contributors and Production ==
The first editor was Tahir Jalaluddin. He was succeeded in March 1908 by Haji Abbas bin Muhammad Taha. The magazine received financial support from three Arab-Malay businessmen in Singapore: Sheikh Muhammad Salim al-Kalali, Sayyid Muhammad ibn Aqil, and Sheikh Awad as-Saidin.

In March 1908, the management was reorganized into the al-Imam Printing Company Ltd. with a capital of $20,000 provided by Sayyid Shaykh al-Hadi, Muhammad ibn Aqil, and Sayyid Hasan bin Shahah.

== Distribution and Legacy ==
The magazine had an extensive distribution network across the Malay Peninsula (Ipoh, Penang, Kuala Lumpur, etc.) and the Dutch East Indies (Aceh, Batavia, Riau, Makassar), and even an agent in Bangkok. Its circulation grew from 2,000 to 5,000 copies, which was remarkably high for the time.

Despite its success, the magazine ceased publication in December 1908 due to the decline of the Riau-Lingga Sultanate. Its spirit was carried on in later publications such as Neraca (1911) and the West Sumatran journal Al-Munir (1911–1916).
