= Sudanese civil war (2023–present) =

- Part of the Sudanese Civil Wars
- Military situation as of 27 September 2026 Controlled by Sudanese Armed Forces and allies (Transitional Sovereignty Council) Controlled by RSF (Government of Peace and Unity) Controlled by SPLM–N (al-Hilu) (New Sudan) Controlled by allied RSF and SPLM–N (al-Hilu) (Government of Peace and Unity and New Sudan) Controlled by Otoro rebel groups Controlled by SLM (al-Nur) (Liberated Areas) (Detailed map) (Engagements)
Date	15 April 2023 – present; (3 years, 7 months and 1 week)
Location	Sudan (with spillovers into Libya, Egypt, Ethiopia, Chad, South Sudan and Central African Republic)
Status	Ongoing
Territorial changes	RSF occupies parts (Note: The municipalities of Tina and Um Baru in North Darfur remain under SAF control. SAF maintains a garrison in Tina. SLM–AW controls Tawila and parts of the Marrah mountains.) of Darfur and Kordofan; SPLM–N (al-Hilu) occupies parts of South Kordofan and Blue Nile; SLM (al-Nur) occupies parts of Darfur; SAF controls an estimated 60% of Sudan

Belligerents
Government of Sudan (TSC); SAF; SSF; CRP; PDF; Popular Resistance; Al-Bara' ibn Malik; SPLM–N (Agar); SLM-Tambour (from Jul. 2023); Joint Force (from Nov. 2023); SLM-Minnawi; JEM; SNA; Masalit militias; Tamazuj (from Aug. 2025); Egypt (from 2025); Ukraine (until 2024)	(Sudan) Government of Peace and Unity (SFA) (from Apr. 2025); RSF; Janjaweed; SLM-TC (from Jul. 2025); SPLM–N (al-Hilu) (from Jul. 2025); LNA; (Central African Republic) CPC (from Aug. 2023); Wagner Group (until early 2024); (Colombia) Desert Wolves; (Chad) Chadian mercenaries; Liberated Areas; SLM-al Nur

Commanders and leaders
Abdel Fattah al-Burhan; Yasser al-Atta; Shams al-Din Kabbashi; Ibrahim Jaber; Malik Agar; Mustafa Tambour; Minni Minnawi; Gibril Ibrahim; Khamis Abakar (executed)	Hemedti; Abdul Rahim Dagalo; Abdul Rahman Jumma; Osman Mohamed; Abu Lulu; Abdelaziz al-Hilu; Khalifa Haftar; (Central African Republic) Noureddine Adam (WIA); Abdul Wahid al-Nur

Strength
2024; ~300,000	2023; 120,000 total fighters (14 April 2023, per SAF); 67,135 fighters; 39,490 recruits; 2,000 Colombian mercenaries; 2,950 vehicles; 104 APCs; 171 vehicles with machine guns; 2024; ~100,000; 2026; 450,000 (per Hemedti)

Casualties and losses
- Highly uncertain, could be more than 150,000–400,000 total killed; Nearly 25 million affected by famine; 4 million children acutely malnourished; 8,856,313 internally displaced; 3,506,383 refugees; 11,000 missing

Since April 2023, there has been a civil war in Sudan between the two main factions of the country's military government. The conflict involves the internationally recognized government of Sudan led by the Sudanese Armed Forces (SAF), under General Abdel Fattah al-Burhan; against the rival Government of Peace and Unity led by the Rapid Support Forces (RSF) paramilitary group, commanded by General Hemedti (Muhammad Hamdan Dagalo Musa). Smaller armed groups have also taken part on both sides, most notably Sudan Liberation Movement splinter groups, the Tamazuj militia, and the Darfur Joint Protection Force.

Fighting began on 15 April 2023 following a power struggle within the transitional administration established after the 2021 coup. As of 6 July 2026, the conflict has forcibly displaced over 14 million people, with 4.5 million fleeing the country as refugees, making it one of the largest displacement crises in recent history. The conflict has also seen heavy influence from foreign powers, especially Russia, Turkey, Saudi Arabia, Iran, Egypt, Ethiopia and the United Arab Emirates, while also experiencing effects from the spillover of neighboring conflicts in the Central African Republic (CAR), Chad and Libya.

The current war erupted amid tensions regarding the integration of the RSF into the Sudanese Army following the 2021 coup. Initial RSF attacks targeted government sites in the capital, Khartoum, and other cities. The conflict began with the Battle of Khartoum, and fighting then spread to the Darfur region. The capital region was divided between the two factions, and al-Burhan relocated his government to Port Sudan. International efforts, including the 2023 Jeddah Declaration, failed to stop the fighting, while various rebel groups entered the war: the SPLM–North attacked the SAF in the south; the Tamazuj movement joined the RSF; and the SAF gained support from factions of the Sudan Liberation Movement and Justice and Equality Movement.

By late 2023, the RSF controlled most of Darfur and advanced on Khartoum, taking over most of the capital, Kordofan and Gezira. The SAF regained momentum in 2024, making gains in Omdurman and retaking Khartoum by March 2025. Despite negotiations, no lasting ceasefire has been reached, and the war continues with severe humanitarian consequences and regional implications.

The city of El Fasher, the SAF's last stronghold in Darfur, was besieged by the RSF from April 2024. On 26 October 2025, the city fell to the RSF, with the city and neighboring villages suffering what some experts called a genocidal massacre inflicting between 60,000 and 70,000 deaths by one estimate. Satellite estimates have been as high as 150,000 dead, making it the largest massacre of the 21st century.

Sudan faces one of the world's most severe humanitarian crises, with widespread famine and 25 million people suffering severe food insecurity. Four million children are acutely malnourished, including 770,000 at imminent risk of death, and famine has been confirmed in several regions. The country faces extreme shortages of water, medicine and aid access, widespread hospital closures, disease outbreaks, mass displacement, looting of humanitarian supplies, and the near-collapse of education and infrastructure, leaving half the population in urgent need. The total death toll of the war comprises fatalities from violence, starvation and disease; thousands remain missing or were killed in targeted massacres primarily attributed to the RSF and allied militias. 61,000 people have died in Khartoum State alone, of whom 26,000 were direct victims of violence. Sexual violence has been widespread. UN under-secretary for humanitarian affairs Tom Fletcher described Darfur as the "epicenter of human suffering in the world".

There have been calls for more aid, legal protections for humanitarian workers, refugee support and a halt to international arms supplies to the RSF, particularly from the United Arab Emirates (UAE). The US, UK, EU and Canada imposed sanctions on entities linked to both factions for ceasefire violations and human rights abuses. Despite denials, the UAE has been found to violate these sanctions by shipping Chinese weaponry to the RSF, which largely funds its operations through gold exports to the UAE. Many civilians in Darfur have been killed as part of the Masalit genocide. On 7 January 2025, the United States government formally determined that the RSF and its allied militias committed acts of genocide.

== Background ==
Since gaining independence in 1956, Sudan has endured chronic instability marked by 20 coup attempts and prolonged military rule, usually interspersed with short periods of democratic parliamentary rule.

Two civil wars, 1955–1972 and 1983–2005, were fought between the central government and the southern regions, killing 1.5 million people and ultimately leading to the independence of South Sudan in 2011. Separately, the conflict in the western region of Darfur displaced two million people and killed more than 200,000.

=== War in Darfur and the formation of the RSF ===
By the turn of the 21st century, Sudan's western Darfur region had endured prolonged instability and social strife due to ethnic tensions and disputes over land and water. In 2003, this situation erupted into a full-scale rebellion, which president and military strongman Omar al-Bashir vowed to crush. The resulting War in Darfur was marked by widespread state-sponsored violence, leading to charges of war crimes and genocide against al-Bashir. The initial phase of the conflict left approximately 300,000 dead and 2.7 million forcibly displaced; even though the intensity of the violence later declined, the situation in the region remained far from peaceful.

To crush uprisings by non-Arab tribes in the Nuba Mountains, al-Bashir relied upon the Janjaweed, a collection of Baggara Arab militias drawn from camel-trading tribes active in Darfur and portions of Chad. In 2013, al-Bashir announced that the Janjaweed would be reorganised as the Rapid Support Forces (RSF) under the command of the Janjaweed's commander General Hemedti. The RSF perpetrated mass killings, rapes, pillage, torture, and destruction of villages. They were accused of ethnic cleansing against the Fur, Masalit, and Zaghawa peoples. Leaders of the RSF have been indicted for genocide, war crimes, and crimes against humanity by the International Criminal Court (ICC), but Hemedti was not personally implicated in the 2003–2004 atrocities.

In 2017, a new law gave the RSF the status of an "independent security force". Hemedti received several gold mines in Darfur as patronage from al-Bashir, and his personal wealth grew substantially. Bashir sent RSF forces to quash a 2013 uprising in South Darfur and deployed RSF units to fight in Yemen and Libya. During this time, the RSF developed a working relationship with the Russian private military outfit Wagner Group. RSF forces grew into the tens of thousands and obtained thousands of armed pickup trucks which regularly patrolled the streets of Khartoum. The Bashir regime supported the RSF and other armed groups to "coup-proof" its power against challenges from within the regular armed forces.

=== Political transition ===
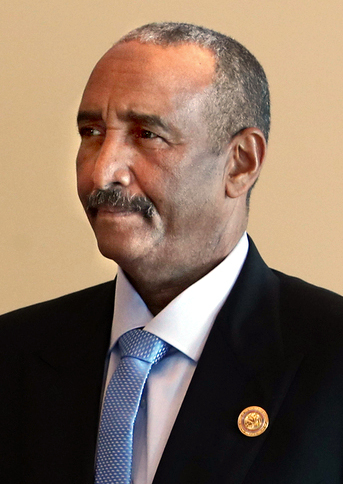
Abdel Fattah al-Burhan, Chairman of the Transitional Sovereignty Council

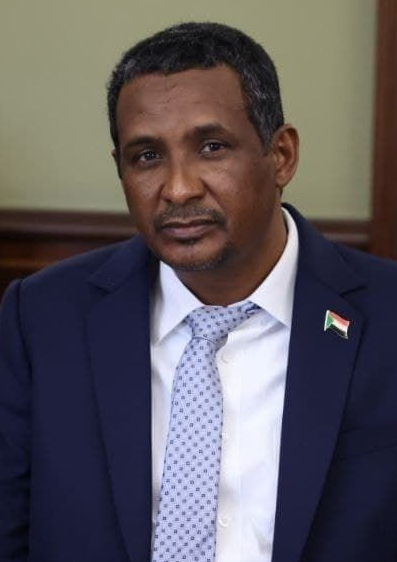
Muhammad Hamdan Dagalo Musa, better known as Hemedti, Commander of the Rapid Support Forces

In December 2018, protests against al-Bashir's regime began, starting the first phase of the Sudanese revolution. Eight months of sustained civil disobedience were met with violent repression. In April 2019, the military (including the RSF) ousted al-Bashir in a coup d'état, ending his three decades of rule; the military established the Transitional Military Council (TMC), a junta. Bashir was imprisoned in Khartoum; he was not turned over to the ICC, which had issued warrants for his arrest. Protests calling for civilian rule continued. In June 2019, the TMC's security forces, including RSF and SAF, attacked persistent demonstrators in the Khartoum massacre, with more than a hundred demonstrators killed and dozens raped. Hemedti denied orchestrating the attack.

In August 2019, in response to international pressure and mediation by the African Union and Ethiopia, the military agreed to share power in an interim joint civilian-military unity government (the Transitional Sovereignty Council, TSC), headed by a civilian Prime Minister, Abdalla Hamdok, with elections planned for 2023. In October 2021, the military junta again seized power in a coup led by SAF leader al-Burhan and Hemedti. Al-Burhan became leader of the TSC government, halting Sudan's transition to democracy. Several factions oppose new elections in Sudan.

=== Origins of the SPLM–N and the SLM ===
The Sudan Liberation Movement (or Army; SLM, SLA, or SLM/A) is a rebel group in the region of Darfur, primarily of members of non-Arab ethnicities which had been repressed by the Bashir regime. Since 2006, the movement has split into several factions due to disagreements over the Darfur Peace Agreement, with some factions joining the government in Khartoum. By 2023, the three most prominent factions were the SLM-Minnawi under Minni Minnawi, the SLM-al-Nur under Abdul Wahid al-Nur, and the SLM-Tambour under Mustafa Tambour. The SLM-Minnawi and SLM-Tambour signed the 2020 Juba Peace Agreement, but the SLM-al-Nur refused and kept fighting.

The SPLM–N was founded by units of the predominantly South Sudanese Sudan People's Liberation Movement/Army stationed in areas that remained in Sudan following the South Sudanese vote for independence in 2011. These forces then led a rebellion in the southern states of South Kordofan and Blue Nile a few months later. In 2017, the SPLM–N split between a faction led by Abdelaziz al-Hilu and one led by Malik Agar, with al-Hilu demanding secularism as a condition for peace, whereas Agar did not agree with this. During the Sudanese revolution, al-Hilu's faction declared an indefinite unilateral ceasefire. In 2020, a peace agreement was signed between the Sudanese government and Agar's faction, with Agar later joining the Transitional Sovereignty Council in Khartoum. Al-Hilu held out until he agreed to sign a separate peace agreement with the Sudanese government a few months later. Further steps to consolidate the agreement stalled following the 2021 coup, and the al-Hilu faction instead signed an agreement with the SLM-al-Nur and the Sudanese Communist Party, agreeing to co-operate to draft a 'revolutionary charter' and remove the military from power.

=== Prelude ===
In the months following the 2021 coup, the already weak Sudanese economy steeply declined, fueling wide protests demanding that the junta return power to civilian authorities. Tensions arose when al-Burhan appointed several old-guard Islamist officials who had dominated politics during the al-Bashir government; Hemedti saw this as an attempt to maintain the dominance of Khartoum's traditional elite, who were hostile to Hemedti due to his ethnic background as a Darfuri Arab. Hemedti expressed regret over his alliance with al-Burhan in the October 2021 coup.

Tensions between the RSF and SAF escalated in February 2023, as the RSF began to recruit members across Sudan. Through February and early March, the RSF built up forces in the capital Khartoum, until a deal was brokered on 11 March and the RSF withdrew. Negotiations were held between the SAF, RSF, and civilian leaders, but they broke down. The chief dispute was over the integration of the RSF units into the regular SAF military: the RSF insisted on a ten-year timetable, while the army demanded two years. Other contested issues included the status of RSF officers in the future hierarchy, and whether RSF forces should be under the command of the army chief rather than Sudan's commander-in-chief, al-Burhan.

On 11 April 2023, RSF forces deployed near the city of Merowe as well as in Khartoum. Government forces ordered them to leave and were refused. RSF forces then took forcible control of the Soba military base south of Khartoum. On 13 April, RSF forces began a general mobilization, raising fears of rebellion, and the SAF declared the mobilization illegal.

== Course of the war ==
=== April–May 2023 ===
==== Battle of Khartoum ====
On 15 April 2023, the RSF attacked SAF bases across Sudan, including Khartoum and its airport. There were clashes at the headquarters of the state broadcaster Sudan TV, eventually captured by RSF forces. Bridges and roads in Khartoum and its hinterland were closed by the RSF. The next day saw an SAF counteroffensive which retook Merowe Airport, near the headquarters of Sudan TV and state radio.

The Sudan Civil Aviation Authority closed the country's airspace as fighting began. Telecommunications provider MTN shut down Internet services, and by 23 April there was a near-total internet outage attributed to attacks on the electricity grid. International trade began to break down, with the major shipping firm Maersk announcing a pause on new shipments.

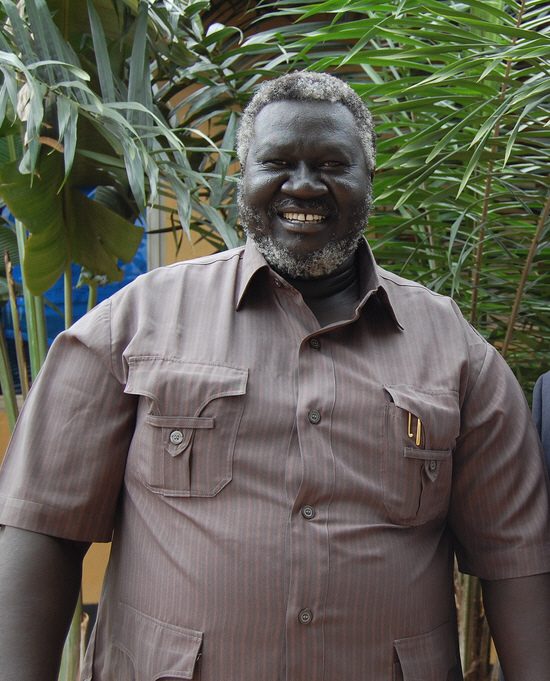
With al-Burhan trapped in Khartoum, his deputy Malik Agar became de facto leader of the Sudanese government.

Hemedti directed his forces to capture or kill al-Burhan, and RSF units engaged in pitched and bloody combat with the SAF Republican Guard. Al-Burhan was besieged and trapped in his headquarters in Khartoum. In an interview with Al Jazeera, Hemedti accused al-Burhan and his commanders of provoking the war by scheming to bring deposed Islamist leader Omar al-Bashir back to power. He called for the international community to intervene against al-Burhan, claiming that the RSF were fighting against radical Islamic militants.

After a few days, SAF brought in reinforcements from the Ethiopian border. Despite a ceasefire announced for Eid al-Fitr, fighting continued across the country. Combat was described as particularly intense along the highway from Khartoum to Port Sudan and in the industrial zone of al-Bagair. Intercommunal clashes were reported in Blue Nile State and in Geneina.

By the beginning of May, the SAF claimed to have weakened the RSF and repelled it in multiple regions. The Sudanese police Central Reserve Forces joined SAF in the streets of Khartoum, claiming to have arrested several hundred RSF fighters. SAF announced an all-out attack on RSF in Khartoum using air strikes and artillery. Air strikes and ground offensives against RSF over the next few days damaged infrastructure but failed to dislodge RSF forces.

Following further threats from Hemedti, al-Burhan gave a public video address from his besieged headquarters, vowing to continue fighting. On 19 May, al-Burhan officially removed Hemedti as his deputy in the Transitional Sovereignty Council, and replaced him with former rebel leader and council member Malik Agar. With al-Burhan trapped in Khartoum, Agar became de facto leader of the Sudanese government, assuming responsibility for peace negotiations, international visits and the day-to-day running of the country.

==== Treaty of Jeddah ====
International attention to the conflict resulted in the United Nations Human Rights Council (UNHRC) voting to increase monitoring of human rights abuses. On 6 May, delegates from SAF and RSF met directly for the first time in Jeddah for "pre-negotiation talks" sponsored by Saudi Arabia and the United States. The warring sides could not agree on a ceasefire, but signed the Treaty of Jeddah on 20 May, promising safe passage of civilians, protection of relief workers, and prohibition of the use of civilians as human shields. Deadly clashes resumed in Geneina, Darfur. UN Under-Secretary-General for Humanitarian Affairs Martin Griffiths expressed frustration at the refusal of both sides to end the fighting.

The situation remained volatile, with both sides trading blame for attacks on churches, hospitals, and embassies. Casualties mounted, particularly in Geneina, where Arab militias loyal to RSF were accused of atrocities against non-Arabs. A temporary ceasefire was signed, but fighting persisted in Khartoum and elsewhere. Between 28 and 97 people were reportedly killed by the RSF and Arab militias when they attacked the predominantly Masalit town of Misterei in West Darfur on 28 May.

=== June–September 2023 ===
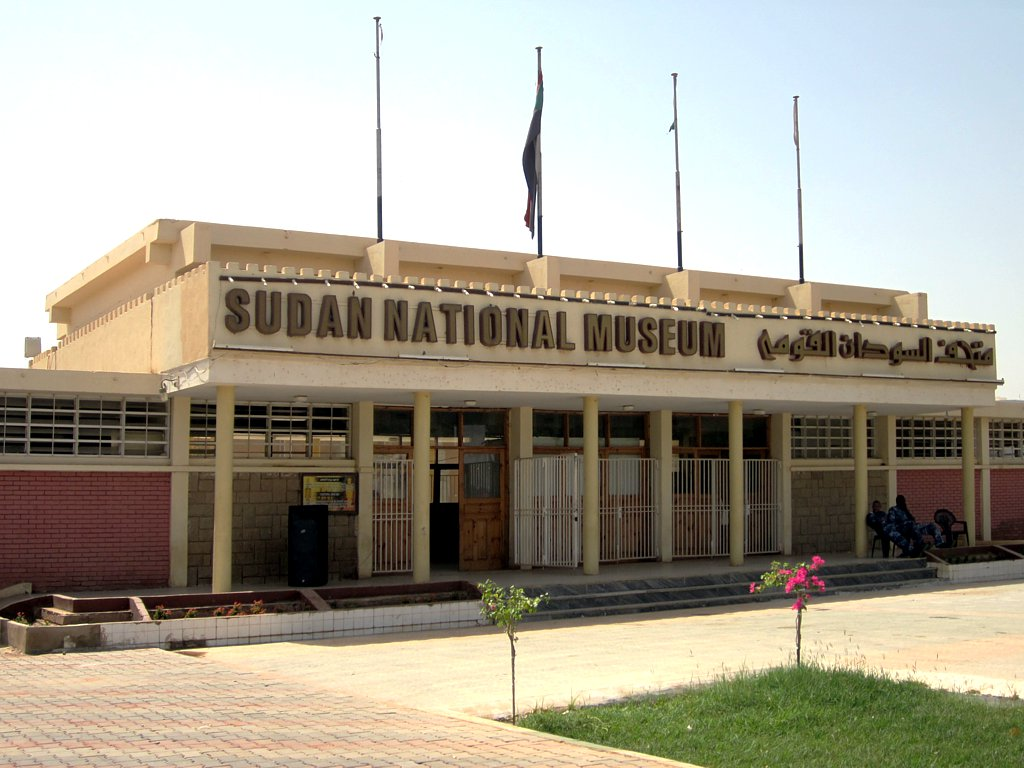
The RSF took control of the National Museum of Sudan in June.

==== Continued fighting in Khartoum ====
As June began, tanks were deployed in battle in Khartoum. The RSF took control of several important cultural and government buildings, including the National Museum of Sudan and the Yarmouk Military Industrial Complex. Acute food insecurity affected a significant portion of Sudan's population.

By July, al-Burhan was still trapped at Army Headquarters, and SAF sent a relief column of troops, which was ambushed and defeated, with RSF claiming it had killed hundreds of soldiers and captured 90 vehicles, along with the column's commander. SAF increased the intensity of their airstrikes and artillery bombardment, often killing dozens of civilians in each strike. RSF shelling also intensified, with many civilian casualties.

Heavy fighting continued through August across Khartoum. RSF laid siege to SAF's Armoured Corps base, breaching its defences and taking control of surrounding neighbourhoods. SAF also made offensives, with the RSF-controlled Republican Palace and Yarmouk Complex coming under SAF air bombardment. An offensive was launched against Yarmouk, but this was beaten back by RSF reinforcements. One of the few remaining bridges between Khartoum and Khartoum North was also destroyed by SAF to impede RSF maneuvers.

On 24 August an SAF operation successfully rescued al-Burhan from his besieged Army Headquarters, allowing him to head to Port Sudan and hold a cabinet meeting there.

==== Diplomatic efforts ====
Ceasefires between the warring parties were announced but often violated, with SAF and RSF blaming each other, while the Sudanese government took action against international envoys. The Saudi embassy in Khartoum was attacked and an orphanage was evacuated amid the chaos. Sudan faced diplomatic strains with Egypt, causing difficulty for Sudanese refugees seeking entry.

Al-Burhan, free for the first time since the start of the war, flew to Egypt to meet president Abdel Fattah al-Sisi. Al-Burhan then made a tour of numerous countries, heading to South Sudan, Qatar, Eritrea, Turkey, and Uganda. He proceeded to New York as head of the Sudanese delegation to the 78th United Nations General Assembly, where he urged the international community to declare the RSF a terrorist organization.

==== SPLM–N (Al-Hilu) involvement ====
The Abdelaziz al-Hilu faction of the Sudan People's Liberation Movement–North (SPLM–N) broke a long-standing ceasefire in June, attacking SAF units in Kadugli, Kurmuk and Dalang, the latter coinciding with an attack by the RSF. SAF claimed to have repelled the attacks, while the rebels claimed to have attacked in retaliation for the death of one of their soldiers, and vowed to free the region from "military occupation". More than 35,000 were displaced by the fighting. Speculation arose as to whether al-Hilu's attacks were part of an unofficial alliance with RSF, or an attempt to strengthen al-Hilu's position in future negotiations. Civil society organizations supporting SPLM–N claimed its operations sought to protect civilians from possible RSF attacks.

Al-Hilu's faction launched further offensives in July, moving into South Kordofan and gaining control of several SAF bases. SAF countered with heavy bombardment of SPLM–N positions. Further attacks by SPLM-N largely petered out after this, with a September assault on Kadugli being pushed back by SAF.

Two years later in February 2025, SPLM–N (Al-Hilu) would officially ally with the RSF, signing the Sudan Founding Charter of the RSF-led Government of Peace and Unity.

==== Darfur front ====
In Darfur, fighting and bloodshed were particularly fierce around the city of Geneina, where hundreds died and extensive destruction occurred. RSF forces engaged in frequent violence against the Masalit of Geneina, leading to accusations of ethnic cleansing. On 4 August, RSF claimed it had taken full control of Central Darfur.

A UN investigation in Darfur discovered numerous mass graves of Masalit civilians. RSF and Arab militias were additionally accused of killing lawyers, human rights monitors, doctors and non-Arab tribal leaders. The governor of West Darfur, Khamis Abakar, was abducted and killed in June, hours after accusing RSF of genocide and calling for international intervention in a TV interview. SAF conducted indiscriminate airstrikes against Darfur that killed many civilians, especially in Nyala.

Tribal and rebel groups in Darfur began to declare allegiance to one of the two warring parties. A faction of the Darfur-based Sudan Liberation Movement led by Mustafa Tambour (SLM-T) joined in support of SAF. In contrast, the controversial Tamazuj rebel group allied with RSF, joined by the leaders of seven Arab tribes, including that of Hemedti.

As September arrived, both sides made offensives in Darfur. RSF took control of several towns in West Darfur and attacked the market of El Fasher, the capital of North Darfur. SAF offensives saw success in Central Darfur, retaking parts of Zalingei from RSF. Fighting also began to spill over into North Kordofan, with SAF attacking RSF positions in the state capital of El-Obeid and clashes over the town of Um Rawaba. Both sides made withdrawals in late September, with RSF retreating from Um Rawaba while SAF withdrew from Tawila.

=== October–December 2023 ===
==== SAF collapse in Darfur ====
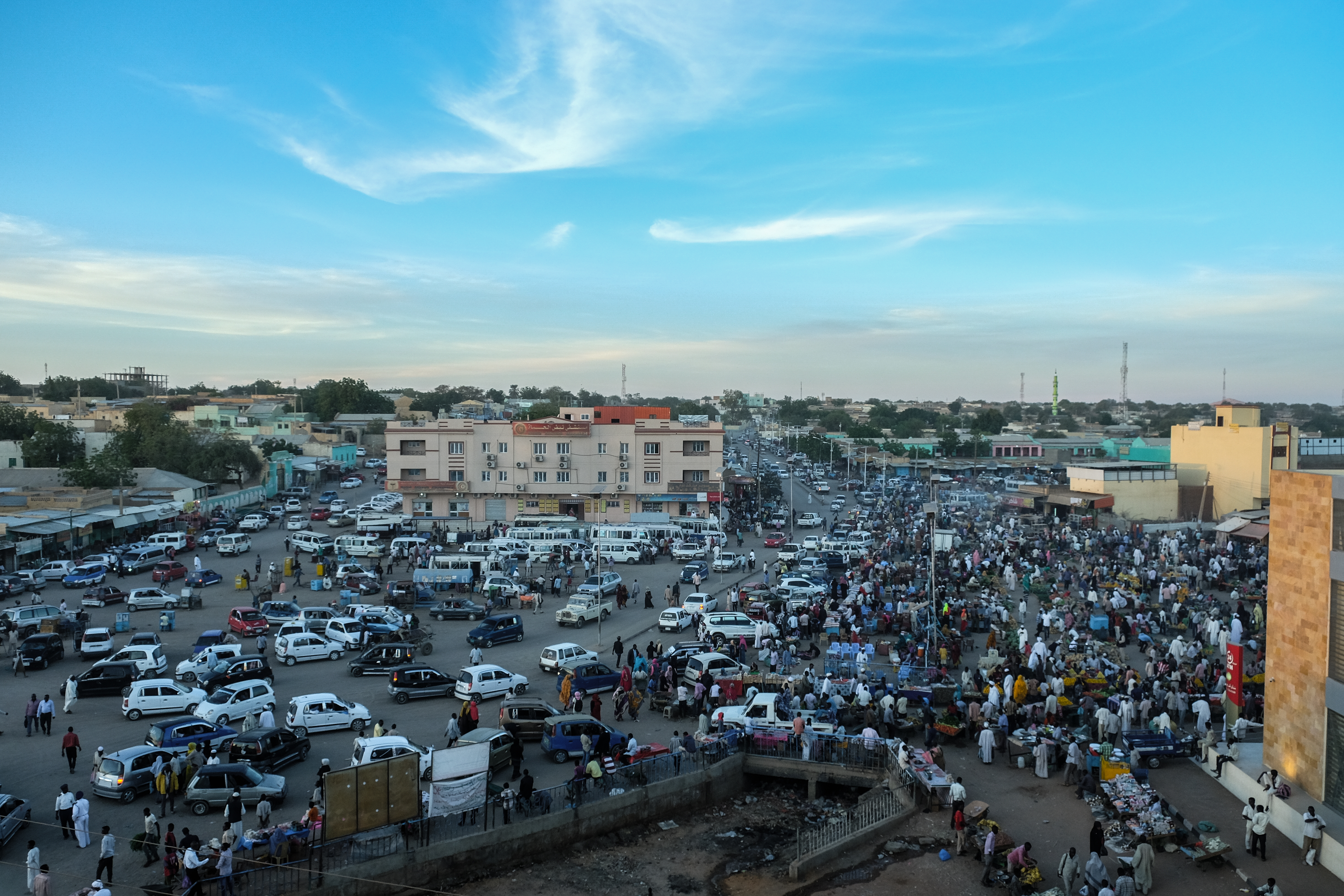
By the end of November, El Fasher was the last of the five state capitals in Darfur under SAF control.

By October 2023, SAF in Darfur was experiencing acute supply shortages due to RSF sieges, and had failed to utilize its air superiority to stem RSF advances. On 26 October, RSF captured Nyala, Sudan's fourth-largest city, after seizing control of SAF 16th Infantry Division headquarters. The fall of Nyala, a strategic city with an international airport and border connections to Central Africa, allowed RSF to receive international supplies more easily and freed up its forces for other campaigns. RSF troops proceeded to march into Zalingei, the capital of Central Darfur, as the SAF 21st Infantry Division fled without a fight.

In Geneina, reports emerged that tribal elders were attempting to broker the peaceful surrender of the SAF garrison. SAF rejected the proposal, raising fears of an imminent RSF assault and causing civilians to flee across the border into Chad. RSF besieged the headquarters of the SAF 15th Infantry Division in Geneina, giving the garrison a six-hour ultimatum to surrender. The base was captured two days later, when the 15th withdrew and fled to Chad. The hundreds left behind were taken prisoner and paraded in RSF media with signs of abuse. Witnesses later reported mass atrocities by the RSF shortly after seizing the city, with a local rebel group claiming up to 2,000 people massacred in the suburb of Ardamata. With Geneina's fall, Ed Daein and El Fasher were the last remaining capitals in Darfur under SAF control, with both cities under heavy RSF pressure.

The RSF stormed and plundered the town of Umm Keddada, east of El Fasher, after the SAF garrison withdrew. SAF troops in El Fasher itself were reported to be running low on food, water, and medicine due to the siege, and external forces noted SAF seemed incapable of stopping the RSF advance. Ed Daein fell in the early hours of 21 November, with RSF forces seizing the headquarters of the SAF 20th Infantry Division. SAF garrisons in East Darfur subsequently abandoned their positions and withdrew, allowing the RSF to occupy the area. In response to RSF gains in Darfur and subsequent abuses, the Justice and Equality Movement, Sudan Liberation Movement/Army (Minnawi), and other smaller rebel factions renounced their neutrality and declared war on the RSF.

==== Peace negotiations stall ====
International attempts to negotiate peace had largely been dormant since the failed Treaty of Jeddah, but in late October 2023, the RSF and SAF met once more in Jeddah. These talks again failed, with neither side willing to commit to a ceasefire, though they again promised to open channels for humanitarian aid. On 3 December 2023, negotiations were halted when neither party fulfilled this promise.

The East African Intergovernmental Authority on Development (IGAD) hosted a peace summit in early December, though SAF had previously accused Kenyan president William Ruto of supporting RSF. IGAD's talks appeared to make some progress, with Hemedti and al-Burhan agreeing to meet in person at some point in the future.

==== RSF crossing of the Nile ====
RSF attacked the town of Wad Ashana in North Kordofan on 1 October along a key commercial route. In West Kordofan, an uptick in fighting was reported, with RSF assaulting a major oil field in Baleela, south of Al-Fulah. Geolocated footage showed RSF fighters celebrating around Baleela Airport after allegedly capturing it. The Battle of Khartoum continued, with RSF seizing the town of al-Aylafoun, southeast of the capital, on 6 October, with RAF seizing key oil infrastructure. By late October, RSF controlled most of Khartoum but had failed to seize key military bases, while al-Burhan's government had largely relocated to Port Sudan.

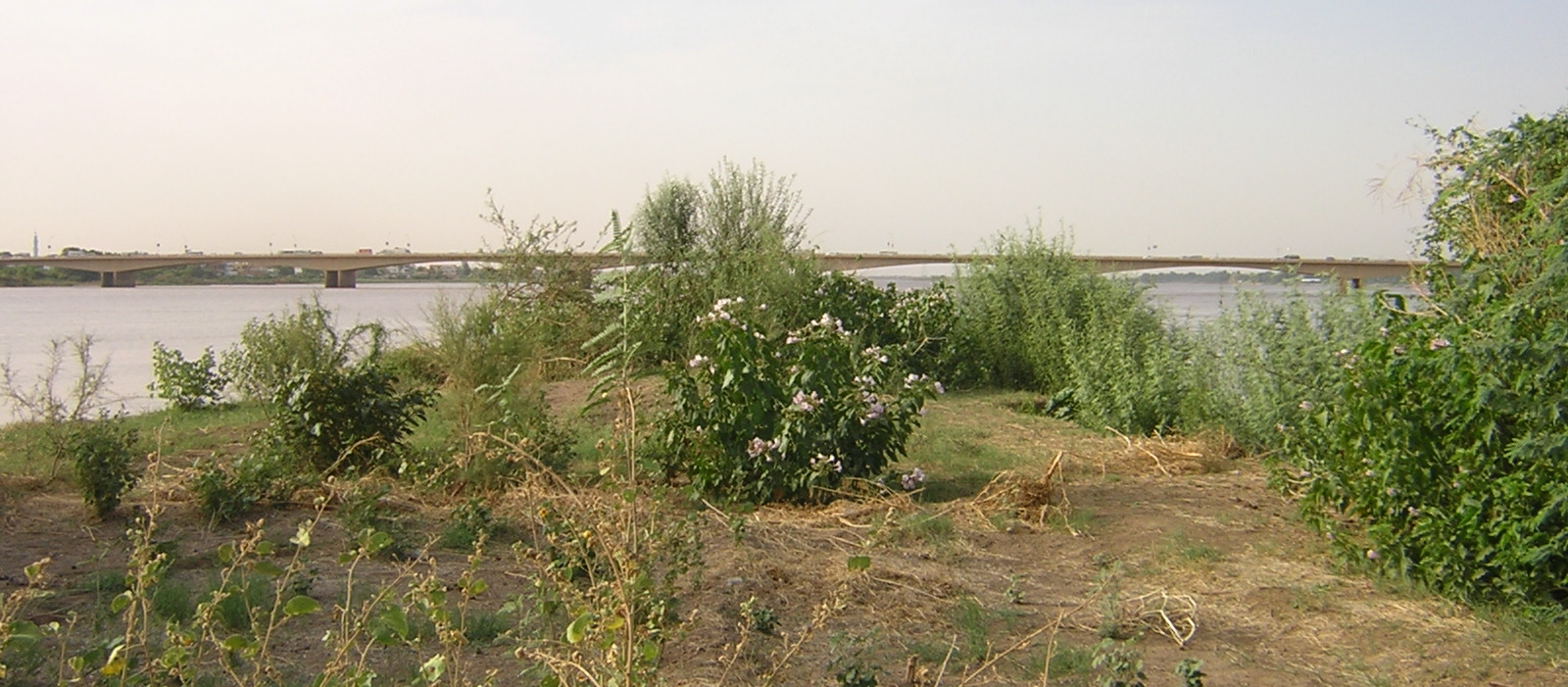
The Shambat Bridge in Khartoum was destroyed on 11 November.

RSF sought to capitalize on its gains by stepping up attacks on SAF positions in Khartoum and Omdurman. Days of fighting culminated in the destruction of the Shambat Bridge connecting Khartoum North to Omdurman over the Nile; the bridge's destruction severed a critical RSF supply route. This effectively cut off RSF forces in Omdurman, giving the SAF a strategic advantage. In an attempt to gain a new crossing over the Nile and supply its forces in Omdurman, RSF attacked the Jebel Aulia Dam in the village of Jabal Awliya. As the dam could not be destroyed without flooding Khartoum, its capture would give RSF a path over the Nile the SAF could not easily remove. A week-long battle commenced over the dam and village, ending in RSF victory on 20-21 November.

On 5 December, local militias along with RSF soldiers attacked SPLM–N (al-Hilu) forces in the village of Tukma, southeast of Dalang in South Kordofan, killing four people and destroying the village. RSF leadership, not wanting hostilities with the then-neutral al-Hilu faction to escalate, condemned this attack, minimizing it as "tribal violence". On 8 December, the RSF entered Gedaref State for the first time.

Pushing south from their gains around Jebel Aulia and Khartoum, RSF forces began to move into Gezira State on 15 December, advancing toward its capital Wad Madani. Elsewhere in Gezira the RSF made major gains, taking control of the city of Rufaa in the state's east and entering the Butana region. After several days of fighting the RSF seized the Hantoob Bridge on Wad Madani's eastern outskirts, crossing the Blue Nile and entering the city. The Sudanese Army put up little resistance in Wad Madani itself, the 1st Division withdrawing from the city as the RSF took over.

The fall of Wad Madani was viewed as a major blow to SAF, as it dramatically widened the frontline and opened up large parts of the country to potential RSF offensives. The city's fall allowed RSF to capture most of Gezira and to make inroads in White Nile State, capturing the town of El Geteina. Within a few days RSF fighters had advanced to within 25 km of Sennar, the largest city in Sennar State. Over the next few weeks RSF forces ventured into rural areas of Al Qadarif State and River Nile State, without establishing a significant presence. In Sennar State the RSF made some further minor advances but had not attacked Sennar City by the year's end.

Amid the deteriorating situation, the SAF were reported to be arming civilians while government officials in the east called on the population to mobilize. Al-Burhan gave a widely promoted public speech to soldiers in Red Sea State, promising to arm civilian militias to fight the RSF and to fight against 'colonialism', which was viewed by observers as a reference to Emirati support for the RSF.

=== January–April 2024 ===
Map of the Sudanese Civil War in March 2024

By January 2024, the war's economic costs had surpassed all prior armed conflicts since Sudanese independence in 1956 due to extensive destruction of infrastructure, particularly in urban areas such as the capital city of Khartoum.

==== Hemedti travels abroad ====
Following the fall of Wad Madani, efforts by IGAD to negotiate a ceasefire made progress as the SAF's weakened position made them more eager to enter talks. Whereas previously opposition from Islamist political groups to negotiation had prevented al-Burhan from committing to a specific date, now both he and Hemedti agreed to meet on 28 December. A day before the meeting was due, it was cancelled as Hemedti recanted his desire to attend.

Instead the RSF leader went on a diplomatic tour, travelling on a chartered Emirati jet and meeting with several African national leaders. One visit that was particularly promoted was his visit to Rwanda, where he met with Rwandan president Paul Kagame and visited the Kigali Genocide Memorial. On the tour Hemedti also met with former Prime Minister Hamdok and his Taqaddum organisation in Addis Ababa, with the RSF agreeing in a declaration negotiated with the Taqaddum to release political prisoners, open up humanitarian aid corridors and negotiate further with the SAF. This tour was regarded by observers as an attempt by Hemedti to portray himself as the leader of Sudan and improve his international image, as his reputation had been severely damaged since the fall of Wad Madani due to large-scale looting by RSF fighters.

On 5 January, al-Burhan vowed to continue the war against the RSF and rejected the latest peace efforts, declaring that war crimes committed by the RSF precluded negotiation. On 14 January, both Hemedti and Burhan received official invitations from IGAD to attend its upcoming summit on 18 January. Hemedti accepted the invitation, but Burhan refused. On 16 January, the Sudanese government suspended its ties with IGAD, accusing the body of violating Sudan's sovereignty. This effectively marked the end of IGAD's efforts to mediate peace talks.

==== Fighting in Kordofan and Gezira ====
As 2024 began, the RSF made attacks into South Kordofan, defeating SAF forces in the town of Habila in the Nuba Mountains and pushing toward Dalang. On 7 January the RSF attacked SAF positions in Dalang, meeting fierce resistance from the army and civilian militias. During the fighting the SPLM–N (al-Hilu) entered the city, taking control of several neighbourhoods. SPLM–N forces proceeded to attack the RSF, and the paramilitary retreated from the city. RSF fighters withdrawing from Dalang entered the city of Muglad in West Kordofan, easily taking control as the city had no organised SAF presence. West Kordofan had been relatively free of fighting for several months due to a local truce brokered by leaders of the Messiria tribe, but as tensions escalated rumours spread that the RSF were planning an attack on the encircled city of Babanusa and the Sudanese Army's 22nd Infantry Division garrisoning it.

In January 2024, the RSF focused on consolidating its gains in Gezira State. Fighting was reported on 17 January east of El Manaqil, the last major town not under RSF control. The SAF delivered weapons to the city by helicopter, including selectively distributing them among civilians in the town, attempting to bolster its defences. Sudan's National Intelligence and Security Service (NISS) selectively recruited and armed civilians based on perceived loyalty. On 24 January 2024, the RSF launched an attack on Babanusa after encircling the city for months. By 25 January, the RSF gained control of the city centre and entered the headquarters of the 22nd infantry division.

Until March 2024, the RSF maintained its position in Gezira State but was unable to break through. The RSF recruited in Gezira State to try to capture territory in El-Gadarif from the SAF. The JEM, which has allied with the SAF, helped the SAF build up its forces in El-Gadarif for a counteroffensive to try to retake Wad Madani. In April 2024, the SAF and its allies began the counteroffensive, attacking from the east and west of Wad Madani in an attempt to retake it. Clashes were reported in Al-Madina Arab on 15 April.

In December 2024, the SAF launched an offensive in southern Gezira. The SAF were able to make small progress, which involved recapturing the town of Wad el-Haddad, a town on the border of Sennar State. It also was able to recapture Um al-Qura, but the RSF reoccupied the village.

In January 2025, the SAF made the first major military operation of 2025. The Sudanese Army was able to make large gains in Gezira and some gains in North Kordofan. On 8 January, the SAF had recaptured Haj-Abdallah after a tense battle that inflicted losses on the RSF. The SAF stated that seven RSF vehicles were destroyed. A day later, the SAF attacked RSF positions in Al-Shabarga in the southeastern part of the state, led by field commander Bassam Abu Satour, leading to the RSF's withdrawal and the SAF recapturing the city, while in the western part of the state, the SAF took control of the villages Mahla, Tahla, and Al-Kumar Al-Jaaliyeen. On 10 January, the SAF recaptured Um al-Qura while the Sudan Shield Forces took Wad al-Abyad. These successful offensives led to the SAF retaking control of Wad Madani on 11 January from three fronts.

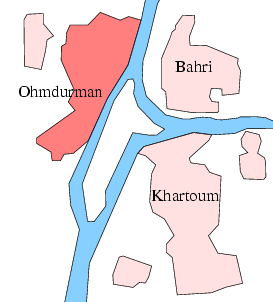
A sketch map of Omdurman with Khartoum and Khartoum North (Bahri). The White Nile flowing from the south is joined by the Blue Nile flowing from the east.

After advancing in Gezira and Khartoum, the SAF launched a military operation in North Kordofan for the first time, after being on the defensive in Darfur and Kordofan from the start of the war. The SAF's "Sayyad Force", captured the entirety of the Umm Ruwaba district.

By the start of February, the SAF had recaptured Al-Hasaheisa, Tambul, and Rufa'a. This left the RSF in control of only northwestern Gezira.

The SAF then liberated the town of Er Rahad on 19 February, and by 23 February, the SAF had lifted the almost two-year siege of El Obeid.

==== SAF gains in Omdurman ====
The SAF gained ground in Omdurman in February 2024, linking up their forces in the northern part of the city and relieving a 10-month siege of their forces in the city centre. The SAF also took control of the Al-Hilal Stadium. The Omdurman front was the first area in Sudan where the SAF has carried out a sustained offensive operation and represents the first breakthrough for the SAF.

On 12 March, the SAF defeated an attempted RSF counteroffensive in Omdurman and took control of the headquarters of the Sudan National Broadcasting Corporation. The RSF maintained its control of Khartoum and continued to threaten Khartoum North.

By April 2024, fighting in Khartoum State was still ongoing, with the RSF in control of the southern and western parts of Omdurman and the SAF in control of the northern and eastern parts of Omdurman, with the RSF controlling the majority of Khartoum and Khartoum North. The SAF continued to prepare an offensive to relieve its surrounded bases in Khartoum North.

As of March 2025, SAF controls the majority of the city. On 29 March, SAF forces announced the control of the Libya Market in Omdurman and seized weapons and equipment left behind by the RSF. On the same day, SAF launched new offensives into the city of Ombadda, west of Omdurman.

=== April–December 2024 ===
==== Fighting in Darfur ====
On 15 April, during the Siege of El Fasher, at least nine civilians were killed in a renewed offensive by the RSF on the city of El Fasher in North Darfur. The Joint Darfur Force declared war on the RSF and allied with the SAF.

The fighting in El Fasher diverted SAF resources from other areas, hampering planned counter-offensives to retake Khartoum and Wad Madani. In particular, the SAF has been using its limited aviation resources to carry out airstrikes in North Darfur and resupply El Fasher using airdrops.

From April 2024, the conflict had been escalating in El Fasher, while the civilians remained trapped with no safety or food. In a June 2024 report, the International Crisis Group said the intensifying battle could lead to mass slaughter, and that there was a need for all sides to de-escalate. The report said the UN and the US should broker the de-escalation and must put pressure on the RSF and its main supporters, including the United Arab Emirates. Crisis Group said the UAE should push the RSF to stand down, and urged all parties to allow the civilians to flee, open the region for aid delivery and resume national peace talks.

On 14 June 2024, the SAF announced that it had killed Ali Yaqoub Gibril, a top RSF commander, in El Fasher. The United States had sanctioned Yagoub in May 2024 for endangering civilians in Darfur. In June 2024, The New York Times reported that more than 40 villages had been burned in El Fasher since April 2024.

==== Fighting in Kordofan ====
As of May 2024, fighting is ongoing in Babanusa, West Kordofan. The RSF are conducting an offensive to attempt to take control of West Kordofan. Fighting was also reported in North Kordofan.

On 20 June 2024, the RSF captured Al-Fulah, the capital of West Kordofan, after the SAF withdrew from the city after several hours of fighting. The SAF retreated to Babanusa, its one remaining base in Kordofan.

==== Fighting along the Nile ====
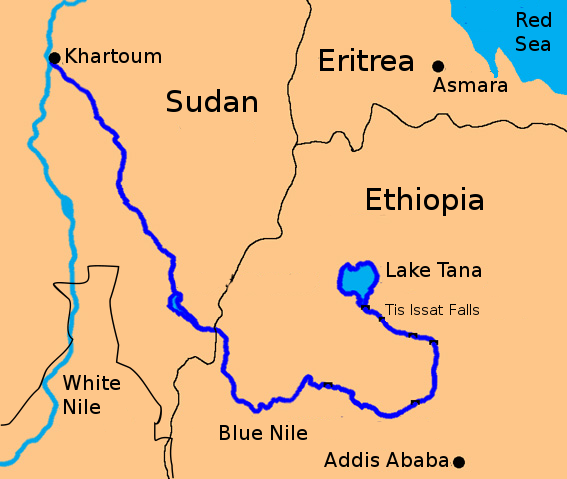
Map of the Blue Nile and White Nile rivers

In May 2024, the RSF launched attacks against the SAF between Khartoum State and River Nile State, as well as in White Nile State near the border with Gezira State. The SAF prepared its forces in River Nile State, ahead of a potential invasion of Khartoum Bahri. In June 2024, the RSF were still in control of Khartoum and Khartoum North, though the SAF controlled one enclave in each that it supplies by airdrop.

In late June 2024, the RSF began an assault in the areas surrounding the city of Sennar. RSF forces struck out to the west of the city, causing the SAF to bring in reinforcements in anticipation of an attack on Sennar itself. Instead RSF forces avoided Sennar and attacked south towards Singa, the capital of Sennar State, capturing the lightly defended town on 29 June. This prevented the SAF from reinforcing Sennar from the south, placing the city under increased pressure.

Following the fall of Singa, SAF resistance collapsed across much of southern Sennar, which led to the RSF occupying the towns of Dinder, Mazmoun and Wad an-Nail with minimal SAF resistance. A united force consisting of the Gedaref-based 2nd SAF Infantry Division and a battalion of the JEM assaulted and retook Dinder on 1 July, but were driven out again by the RSF over the next few days.

On 20 July, the RSF announced the death of Brigadier General Abdel Rahman Al-Bishi, its head of operations in Sennar and Blue Nile States, with Sudanese media reporting that he had been killed in a SAF airstrike.

On 3 August, the RSF launched its first attack on Blue Nile State since the beginning of the war, with the group and the SAF contesting control over Al-Tadamun. On 15 August 2024, the Galgani massacre was carried out by the RSF, which killed at least 108 people, including at least 24 women and children.

==== SAF offensives ====
As September 2024 came, for the first time since the start of the war the balance of power seemed to be tipping towards the SAF. On 26 September, the SAF launched a major offensive against RSF positions in Khartoum. The attack on the city came from three fronts striking from the south, east and west of the capital. SAF airstrikes, which killed four and wounded 14, began at dawn followed by clashes within the city. The SAF reportedly captured three key bridges connecting Khartoum to other nearby cities, including the Omdurman Bridge which had previously acted as a line of separation between government and RSF control. Faced with an elusive enemy, the SAF became bogged down in urban fighting, with RSF snipers routinely paralyzing infantry advances.

October 2024 was the deadliest month for Sudanese civilians since the war began. In Khartoum, the RSF have relentlessly shelled areas controlled by the SAF, which has amounted to daily indiscriminate bombardments of civilian areas. Escalating SAF airstrikes on RSF positions have caused dozens of civilian deaths. In October 2024, the SAF also launched counteroffensives in the states of Sennar and Gezira, which were successfully recaptured from the RSF. Starting on 20 October 2024, the RSF carried out the 2024 eastern Gezira State massacres, which killed at least 300 people and wounded at least 200 more.

According to a report by the French newspaper Le Monde, as of November 2024, the war in Sudan has possibly entered its most dangerous phase since it began in April 2023. Both the SAF and RSF have officially ruled out settling the civil war through negotiations, with the only option on the table being total war. During the recent rainy season which brought a lull in the fighting, each side rearmed and restructured their forces. Many ordinary Sudanese, extending to the most serious critics of the SAF, have increasingly supported the SAF in response to RSF war crimes and atrocities. The SAF has become increasingly dependent on Islamist networks, as these movements have mobilized many civilians from popular resistance brigades. The Al-Bara' ibn Malik Battalion in particular is presently fighting on the Khartoum front lines against the RSF and has consequently gained popularity. On 23 November, the SAF retook Singa following an offensive.

=== 2025 ===
==== Liberation of Khartoum ====
The SAF retook Wad Madani, the capital of Gezira State on 11 January. On 8 February 2025, the SAF regained control of nearly all of Khartoum North as it intensified its offensive, and was preparing to retake the capital of Khartoum itself. On 24 February, the RSF claimed responsibility for downing a Russian-made Ilyushin aircraft in Nyala. Meanwhile, the RSF declared a rival government in Nairobi, the capital of Kenya, which the SAF-aligned administration refused to recognize.

On 20 March, the SAF announced it was within 500 metres of the Presidential Palace and captured it on the next day. On 22 March, the SAF also recaptured the headquarters of the Central Bank of Sudan and the General Intelligence Service in Khartoum. It also retook Tuti Island, situated at the confluence of the Blue Nile and the White Nile, after advancing through the Tuti Bridge. On 26 March, they retook Khartoum International Airport and Jebel Aulia, regarded as the RSF's last stronghold in the capital, with al-Burhan proclaiming the liberation of Khartoum later in the day. On 20 May, the SAF announced the clearing of Khartoum State from the RSF.

==== Fall of El Fasher ====
Earlier in November 2024, the SAF reportedly shifted tactics: withdrawing from outer bases to lure RSF forces into trap engagements, especially in the southern axis of El Fasher. From December 2024 onwards the RSF were also mobilising additional fighters across Darfur for a concerted operation on the city. Reports mentioned mobilisation of some 200 fighters from Central Darfur, the recruitment of foreign mercenaries and the RSF staging air and ground assaults on the city's hospitals and camps.

In April, the RSF launched a major offensive in North Darfur, aiming to capture El Fasher, the last state capital in the region under SAF control. Beginning on 11 April, RSF ground and aerial assaults struck El Fasher and surrounding displacement camps, including Zamzam and Abu Shouk. By 13 April, the RSF claimed control of Zamzam camp after intense fighting that left over 200 civilians dead, including children and aid workers. The SAF denied RSF accusations of militarizing the camp, while rights groups documented widespread abuses by RSF fighters, including targeted killings and sexual violence.

Artillery fire by RSF howitzers preceded ground attacks deep into the southern and northwestern sectors of the city. On 30 June 2025, an RSF-launched howitzer barrage targeted SAF forward positions in southern El Fasher, which the SAF responded to with artillery and drone strikes. During this exchange, civilian neighbourhoods were also caught in the fighting; one hospital source reported injuries to civilians though exact numbers were not confirmed.

On 19 September, RSF combat columns pushed toward SAF positions near the "Super Camp" southwest of the city, after which SAF sources reported defensive operations in the neighbourhoods of Al-Nasrat, Al-Shorfa and Al-Qubba. The RSF had already throughout the siege of El Fasher erected earthen berms encircling the city from the north, west and east, forming a kill-box environment that severely restricted SAF resupply and civilian movement.

By August and September 2025, the siege conditions had degraded SAF supply lines significantly; SAF units admitted to hunger, low morale and desertion as food, ammunition and medical logistics dwindled. RSF penetrations into the city's periphery, especially blocks 16 and 17 of Abu Shouk and Naivasha market area, indicated that the outer ring of SAF control was collapsing.

In October, the RSF took complete control of the headquarters of the 6th Infantry Division, the main base of the SAF in El Fasher. On 28 October, General al-Burhan confirmed that the SAF had withdrawn from El Fasher, confirming RSF control over the city. In October 2025, humanitarian workers and local officials reported that more than 2,500 civilians were summarily executed by the RSF following the fall of the city. The WHO reported that more than 460 patients and their companions were killed inside the city's last functioning hospital. Analysis of satellite imagery suggested that the RSF disposed of tens of thousands of bodies through burial and incineration to cover up mass killings. As of December 2025, some estimates place the total deaths from the El Fasher massacre between 60,000 and 68,000+. Kholood Khair estimated that 100,000 people were killed in the "genocidal violence" but noted that there were no official figures due to the lack of governance in the region.

==== Kordofan offensives ====
On 1 May, the RSF announced that they had taken control of En Nahud, a strategic city in West Kordofan that was previously used by the SAF to send forces to Darfur. Despite initial setbacks, Al-Khiwai in West Kordofan was retaken by the SAF on 11 May, and on 13 May, the town of Al-Hamadi in South Kordofan, an administrative hub for the Hawazma tribe, was also retaken by the SAF, alongside some strongholds in southern Omdurman previously held by the RSF, such as the Al-Jami'a neighbourhood and all of the Al-Shaqla neighbourhood.

On 1 December, the RSF announced that they had taken control of Babanusa, the last SAF-held city in West Kordofan, after a two-year siege. On 8 December, the RSF seized the Heglig oil field after the Sudanese Army withdrew across the southern border, as they feared fighting to defend the oilfield would see it destroyed. Production at Heglig was at about 20,000 barrels per day, significantly down from the pre-war level of 64,000. Upon arriving in Unity State, South Sudan, the Sudanese soldiers were disarmed by the South Sudan People's Defence Forces. Lt. Gen. Johnson Olony, South Sudan's Deputy Chief of Defence Forces for Mobilisation and Disarmament, said: "We received them because they are our brothers". He also said this was coordinated between President Salva Kiir of South Sudan and Abdel Fatah al-Burhan. Olony also said his army would take Heglig from the RSF "... to prioritize regional stability."

==== Fighting in border regions ====
On 5 May 2025, the RSF attacked Port Sudan for the first time using drones.

On 19 May, the SAF took Wadi al-Atrun in Al-Malha, located on a strategic road linking Northern State and North Darfur. On 21 May, the SAF said it had cleared White Nile State of the RSF. On 23 May, the SAF announced the capture of the strategic city of Dibebad in South Kordofan.

On 10 June, part of the border triangle linking Sudan, Libya, and Egypt at Gabal El Uweinat was attacked by the RSF and Libyan National Army (LNA), led by Khalifa Haftar, which struck directly into Sudanese territory controlled by the SAF. On 11 June, the RSF announced that they had entirely occupied the area; The SAF retreated and condemned the LNA for the strikes. By 16 June, the RSF had captured the entire Sudan-Libya border. On 22 June, after several days of fighting, the SPLM–N (al-Hilu) cut off the road connecting Kadugli and Dalang, placing them under siege. On 26 June, SAF recaptured Malken in the Blue Nile front as part of efforts to increase the pressure toward RSF. The SAF launched a massive counterattack on 28 June, reopening the road between Dalang and Kadugli.

==== Diplomacy ====
Diplomatic efforts to broker a truce were active in early 2025 but largely unsuccessful. Various proposed peace talks held in London, Washington, and Geneva failed to produce a lasting agreement.

In April 2025, a British-led conference in London attempted to establish a contact group to restart negotiations, but the effort faltered when key Arab states (especially Egypt, Saudi Arabia, and the UAE) refused to endorse a joint communiqué. While the UK, EU, and African Union pushed for a ceasefire and political roadmap, the regional powers prioritized different outcomes.

By September 2025, the United States together with Saudi Arabia, Egypt, and the UAE—known collectively as the "Quad"—presented a formal peace plan. The roadmap proposed a three-month humanitarian truce, to be followed by a permanent ceasefire and a nine-month political transition to civilian-led governance. However, implementation remained uncertain: the SAF voiced strong reservations, particularly demanding that the RSF withdraw from civilian areas before any truce could take effect. Furthermore, growing strains between two members of the Quad, Saudi Arabia and the UAE, came to dominate the roadmap negotiations.

Meanwhile, RSF leaders announced that they would accept the Quad's proposal for a "humanitarian ceasefire" to mitigate the civilian toll. Some in the SAF posited that the truce would allow the RSF to consolidate gains after the fall of El Fasher.

=== 2026 ===
==== Government back in Khartoum ====
In March 2025, the SAF recaptured Khartoum, which had been captured by RSF shortly after the war began in 2023. After being based in Port Sudan for nearly three years, Sudan's military-led government returned to Khartoum on 11 January 2026, where Prime Minister Kamil Idris said it would start restoring services for a city devastated by war. The city remains badly damaged after mass displacement, looting, occupation of civilian homes, and the near collapse of basic services.

==== Kordofan ====
In early 2026, fighting intensified in the Kordofan region, where almost daily drone strikes resulted in substantial civilian casualties and struck markets, health facilities, and residential areas. The shift in the epicentre of the conflict followed the SAF's recapture of Khartoum and the RSF's consolidation of control in Darfur. According to the conflict monitor ACLED, control of the Kordofan states would strengthen the RSF's ability to regain access to Sudan's central corridor and reinforce its rival administration in western Sudan. Both sides have been accused of carrying out strikes on civilian targets, while hundreds of thousands of people have been displaced and famine conditions were reported in parts of South Kordofan.

In late January 2026, the SAF entered Kadugli, the capital of South Kordofan, and broke the nearly two-year RSF siege of Dilling, reopening eastern supply routes into the region even as drone strikes and fighting continued elsewhere in Kordofan.

In late June 2026, the U.S. State Department issued a formal warning that the RSF were massing near the city of El Obeid. American intelligence sources indicated that “mass atrocities” against civilians may occur if the RSF were to capture El Obeid. In response, the RSF claimed that their activities near El Obeid were nothing more than "just a normal military operation" and that any casualties would be nothing more than "the normal cascade of war".

In late July 2026, the SAF and their allies recaptured the road linking El Obeid and Omdurman. SAF columns moved from the north and south and captured Umm Sayalla, Bara and Jabra al-Sheikh during the initial advance before entering Gereij and Umm Girfa. The road has been controlled by the RSF since the beginning of the civil war and its capture opens one more line of communication for the SAF to supply El Obeid, though RSF fighters might still be located close to the road and may be able to attack army convoys and cut off sections of the road.

In mid-November 2026, the SAF and the allies started a major offensive in West Kordofan, recapturing Ayal Bakhit on 7 November, and Al-Khuwai on 13 November. Both areas had been under RSF control since May 2025. Their recapture brought the SAF and allied forces closer to En-Nahud, the second-largest city in West Kordofan state.

==== Darfur ====
In June 2026, the Office of the United Nations High Commissioner for Human Rights released a report on sexual violence in the Darfur Region. According to the Report, sexual violence escalated sharply throughout Darfur throughout 2025 and early 2025. In particular, the UNOHCR noted outbreaks of sexual violence and abductions committed against Zaghawa women and girls during RSF offensives, including the 2025 RSF offensives on El Fasher and Zamzam.

==== Escalation in drone attacks ====
In October 2026, drone attacks escalated across Sudan, with the UN verifying a death toll of at least 300 in the first three months of the war. These attacks included an SAF drone strike in West Kordofan that killed 150 people on 18 October, and a strike on the Amiet market in Abyei a day later that killed between 150 and 220. On 26 October, a drone strike hit a market in Nyala, killing at least 102 people.

The RSF also launched a campaign against power stations in SAF-controlled territory, hitting sites in the states of Khartoum, White Nile, Gezira, Sennar, Gedaref, and Red Sea since 26 October.

== Casualties and war crimes ==
The fatality numbers are highly uncertain. According to a report published by Le Monde in November 2024, the war may have killed over 150,000 civilians through the combined tolls of bombardments, massacres, starvation and disease. Total deaths could be significantly more than 150,000. A November 2024 report from the London School of Hygiene & Tropical Medicine estimated more than 61,000 deaths in Khartoum State alone, for the period between April 2023 and June 2024.

Early in the conflict, doctors on the ground warned that reported figures did not include all casualties as people could not reach hospitals due to difficulties in movement. Soon after the war broke out, a spokesperson for the Sudanese Red Crescent was quoted as saying that the number of casualties "was not small". The Sultanate of Dar Masalit claimed on 20 June 2023 that more than 5,000 people were killed and about 8,000 were wounded in fighting in West Darfur alone, while a Masalit tribal leader told the Sudanese news outlet Ayin Network on 22 July 2023 that more than 10,000 people had been killed in the state. Sudanese prosecutors recorded over 500 missing persons cases across the country, some of which were enforced disappearances, and were mostly blamed on the RSF. On 2 May 2024, a US Senate hearing on the war estimated that between 15,000 and 30,000 people had died, but considered that to be an underestimation by a factor of 10 to 15, stating the real death toll could be as high as 150,000. As of 27 May 2024, Armed Conflict Location and Event Data Project data reported 17,044 fatalities.

On 29 March 2025, the Sudanese Group for Defending Rights and Freedoms said that it had recorded 50,000 missing persons cases since the beginning of the war. In early December, authorities reported that thousands of bodies hastily buried by residents and fighters were exhumed from Khartoum and the surrounding area. Sources reported that 15,000 bodies were recovered since April 2024. Efforts to recover corpses buried outside of cemeteries began in April 2024 and was estimated to complete recoveries in Khartoum before 2026.

=== Darfur ===
In Geneina, West Darfur, ethnic clashes that began in the last week of April 2023 had killed at least 1,100 people, while the Sultanate of Dar Masalit claimed that more than 5,000 people were killed and about 8,000 were wounded in the city. In July 2023, a Masalit tribal leader claimed that more than 10,000 people had been killed in West Darfur alone, and that 80% of Geneina's residents had fled.

Massacres were recorded in towns such as Tawila and Misterei, while a mass grave was discovered in Geneina containing the bodies of 87 people killed in clashes. Several intellectuals, politicians, professionals and nobility were assassinated. Most of these atrocities were blamed on the RSF and allied Arab militias. The UK government, witnesses and other observers described the violence in the region as tantamount to ethnic cleansing or even genocide, with non-Arab groups such as the Masalit being the primary victims. Mujeebelrahman Yagoub, Assistant Commissioner for Refugees in West Darfur called the violence worse than the War in Darfur in 2003 and the Rwandan genocide in 1994.

=== Foreign casualties ===
Foreign casualties in the Sudanese civil war
Country	Deaths	Ref.
Ethiopia	15	
Syria	15	
Democratic Republic of the Congo	10	
Eritrea	9	
United States	2	
India	1	
Turkey	1	

Civilians, including 15 Syrians, 15 Ethiopians and nine Eritreans have been killed across the country. An Indian national working in Khartoum died after being hit by a stray bullet on 15 April. Two Americans were killed, including a professor working in the University of Khartoum who was stabbed to death while evacuating. A two-year-old girl from Turkey was killed while her parents were injured after their house was struck by a rocket on 18 April. Ten students from the Democratic Republic of the Congo were killed in an SAF airstrike on the International University of Africa in Khartoum on 4 June. The SAF claimed that the Egyptian assistant military attaché was killed by RSF fire while driving his car in Khartoum, which was denied by the Egyptian ambassador.

Two Greek nationals trapped in a church on 15 April sustained leg injuries when caught in crossfire while trying to leave. A Filipino migrant worker and an Indonesian student at a school in Khartoum were injured by stray bullets. On 17 April, the European Union Ambassador to Sudan, Aidan O'Hara of Ireland, was assaulted by unidentified "armed men wearing military fatigues" in his home, he suffered minor injuries and was able to resume working on 19 April. On 23 April, a French evacuation convoy was shot at, injuring one person. The French government later confirmed the casualty to be a French soldier. An employee of the Egyptian embassy was shot and injured during an evacuation mission.

==== Evacuation of foreign nationals ====
Repatriations through the European Union Civil Protection Mechanism

The outbreak of violence has led foreign governments to monitor the situation in Sudan and move toward the evacuation and repatriation of their nationals. Among some countries with several expatriates in Sudan are Egypt, which has more than 10,000 citizens in the country, and the United States, which has more than 16,000 citizens, most of whom are dual nationals. Efforts at extraction were hampered by the fighting within the capital Khartoum, particularly in and around the airport. This has forced evacuations to be undertaken by road via Port Sudan on the Red Sea, which lies about 650 km (400 miles) northeast of Khartoum. from where they were airlifted or ferried directly to their home countries or third ones. Other evacuations were undertaken through overland border crossings or airlifts from diplomatic missions and other designated locations with direct involvement of the militaries of some home countries. Some transit hubs used during the evacuation include the port of Jeddah in Saudi Arabia and Djibouti, which hosts military bases of the United States, China, Japan, France, and other European countries.

=== War crimes ===
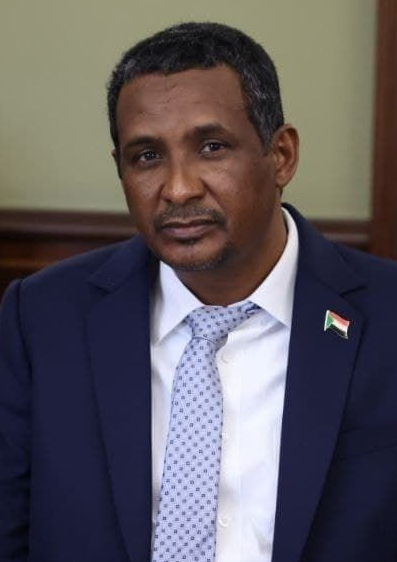
Hemedti, commander of the RSF, is sanctioned by the United States government and accused of genocide, war crimes, and sexual violence.

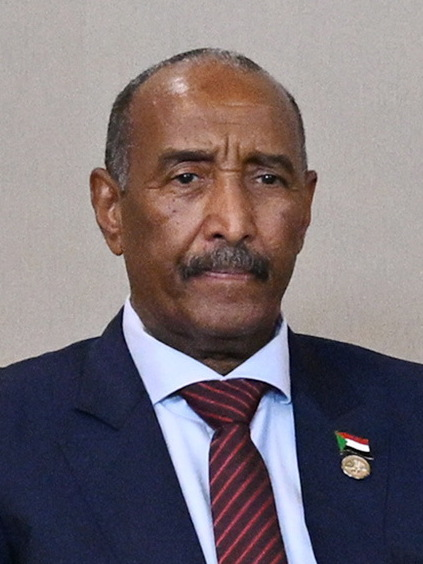
Abdel Fattah al-Burhan, commander of the SAF, is sanctioned by the United States government and accused of war crimes and using chemical weapons on civilians.

In Geneina, West Darfur, the RSF and Arab militias killed more than 15,000 non-Arab people. On 22 July, a Masalit tribal leader claimed that more than 10,000 people had been killed in West Darfur alone, and that 80% of Geneina's residents had fled. Massacres against the Masalit were recorded in towns such as Tawila, Sirba, Ardamata, Kutum, and Misterei, while a mass grave was discovered around Geneina. The UK and US governments, witnesses, and other observers described the violence in the region as tantamount to ethnic cleansing or even genocide, with non-Arab groups such as the Masalit being the primary victims. The RSF and Arab militias are also accused of widespread robberies, looting food meant to feed 4.4 million people, and sexual violence against Sudanese and foreign women, particularly Masalit and non-Arab women. NGOs estimate that the actual figure of sexual violence victims could be as high as 4,400. In March 2024, UNICEF reported that armed men were raping and sexually assaulting children as young as one year old. The UN was urged to start an inquiry, and governments were encouraged to allocate resources to aid survivors.

The RSF and Arab militias in Sudan are also accused of targeted torture and killings of intellectuals, politicians, professionals, and tribal leaders. Notable victims include Adam Zakaria Is'haq, a physician and human rights advocate, and Khamis Abakar, the governor of West Darfur, who was kidnapped, tortured, and executed. The RSF also targeted the families of their opponents, such as Mustafa Tambour's family. The SAF and RSF are accused of threatening, attacking, and killing journalists and activists during the conflict. The Sudanese Journalists Syndicate documented over 40 violations in May 2023 alone. Several journalists were injured or killed, and 13 newspapers ceased operations. Humanitarian workers were also targeted, with 18 killed and many others detained.

The International Criminal Court and Amnesty International are investigating war crimes and crimes against humanity committed during the war. The SAF accused the RSF of perpetrating these crimes. General Abdel Fattah al-Burhan (SAF commander) established a committee to investigate these allegations. Several countries proposed a motion to the UN Human Rights Council for an investigation into the atrocities. The UN Human Rights Council voted to adopt a resolution creating a fact-finding committee on these crimes. Human Rights Watch and the United Nations Integrated Transition Assistance Mission in Sudan have called for measures to protect civilians.

On 11 July 2025, the International Criminal Court (ICC) reported to the United Nations Security Council that war crimes and crimes against humanity are currently being committed in Sudan's Darfur region, including a severe humanitarian crisis with over 30 million people in need, amid the ongoing conflict.

On 25 January 2026, WHO published a report on the situation in terms of public health, stating that around 33 million people are in need of humanitarian assistance, with 21 million more facing a food insecurity.

=== Accusations of chemical warfare ===
During the war, multiple reports have alleged the use of chemical weapons by the SAF. France 24’s Observers unit, using open‑source imagery and witness testimony, concluded that SAF aircraft dropped barrels of chlorine gas near the al‑Jaili refinery in 2024. In 2025 the United States government formally determined that Sudan had used chemical weapons in the conflict, and in 2026 it stated at the Organisation for the Prohibition of Chemical Weapons (OPCW) that Sudan remained in non‑compliance with the Chemical Weapons Convention, announcing sanctions and calling for immediate international inspections of suspected chemical‑weapons sites. In July 2026, Urwa al-Sadiq, the assistant head of the National Umma Party, accused the SAF-aligned authorities under General al-Burhan of implementing a policy of denial and "procedural maneuvering" to delay inspections, while systematically cordoning off and cleaning up affected zones—including Khartoum Hospital, the Sudan National Broadcasting Corporation facilities, and the al-Jaili refinery—to conceal physical evidence of chemical weapons usage.

== Foreign involvement ==
Sudan Countries supplying arms to the SAF Countries supplying arms to the RSF

As the conflict has evolved, it has increasingly taken on regional dimensions. Analysts describe the war as shaped not only by internal rivalries but also by the involvement of external actors providing financial, military, and diplomatic support to the warring parties, contributing to dynamics resembling a proxy war.

=== Foreign arms supplies to both sides ===
In June 2024, a briefing by Amnesty International stated that the constant flow of foreign weapons is fueling the war and breaching the Darfur arms embargo. The organization found that the recently manufactured or transferred weapons and ammunition were being imported in large quantities into Sudan from China, Russia, Turkey, Yemen, the UAE and Serbia. The weapons supply has impacted the war by causing massive civilian displacement and a humanitarian crisis in Sudan. Both warring sides were using Chinese-manufactured advanced drone jammers, mortars and anti-material rifles. The RSF were also reported to be using recently manufactured armoured personnel carriers from the UAE. In October 2025, the SAF recovered boxes of arms, ammunitions and medicines supplied by the United Arab Emirates from an area previously held by the RSF in southeast Sudan. The UAE had been previously known for their support to the Sudanese military, and marginalised civilian rule by promoting the idea of Hemedti to helm the country's economic policy "in the interests of a stable transition". The RSF primarily funds its operations through gold exports to supporting countries, including the UAE, Kenya and Ethiopia. In 2025, after declaring their support for the RSF, Ethiopia and Kenya published quarterly gold production figures that were double those of the previous year.

=== Canada ===
A federal department referred a contract from Canadian lobbying firm Dickens & Madsen Inc. to the RCMP for investigation after Amnesty International asked the government of Canada to investigate this over possible violations on sanctions in Sudan. The contract was signed between Hemedti and Ari Ben-Menashe (head of the company) in May 2019 for US$6 million, a month before the Khartoum massacre. The aim was to present the military regime in positive light, securing meetings with potential oil investors and officials from US, Libya, Saudi Arabia and Russia to strengthen international ties, funding and equipment.

In November 2025, Mark Carney visited to Abu Dhabi to meet with the UAE president. Carney said he discussed the Sudan civil war during this meeting, though the details are unclear. In addition, Canada exports weapons to the UAE; however, the UAE insists these weapons do not flow into the hands of the RSF.

Despite this, Canadian weapons have been seen used by RSF soldiers. In 2016, a United Nations panel accused Canadian company STREIT Group of breaking the arms embargo against Sudan. The allegation involved a 2012 sales of 24 armoured vehicles. This is the third time the UN has condemned the company's actions, which violated the terms of the UN Arms Trade Treaty, signed by Canada in 2019 to prohibit the export of arms to Sudan directly or through third countries. STREIT Group claimed that the exports do not violate controls because they do not have weapons attached to them.

There has also been documentation of STREIT Group's armored vehicles over the years. RSF soldiers were also seen posting on social media over the years in armored vehicles manufactured by the group, along with rifles manufactured by another Canadian company, Sterling Cross Defense Systems.

=== Chad ===
On 7 June 2023, Hissein Alamine Tchaw-tchaw, a Chadian dissident who belongs to the same ethnic group as Hemedti and claims to be the leader of the Movement for the Fight of the Oppressed in Chad (MFOC), which is fighting the government of President Mahamat Déby, posted a video showing his participation in an RSF attack on the Yarmouk munitions factory in Khartoum.

On 17 November 2023, the SLM-Minnawi and the Justice and Equality Movement (JEM) accused the Chadian government of supporting the RSF, and "supplying it with military equipment and mercenaries by opening its territory and airspace". A report from Africa Analyst alleged that Chadian soldiers belonging to a joint Chadian-Sudanese command under Osman Bahr intercepted a shipment of military equipment intended for the RSF on its way from N'Djamena and gave it instead to the JEM, which the latter denied. The Economist linked Chad's junta receiving financial support from the UAE in exchange for allowing it to support the RSF through Amdjarass airport.

Following accusations by SAF deputy commander Yasser al-Atta of Chadian government support for the RSF, the Chadian government unsuccessfully demanded an apology from the Sudanese ambassador and expelled four Sudanese diplomats from the country on 17 December.

On 5 November 2024, the government of Sudan filed a complaint with the African Commission on Human and Peoples' Rights (ACHPR) demanding reparations from Chad for their support of the RSF, accusing Chad of violating international law.

On 23 February 2026, Chad shut its eastern border with Sudan indefinitely, citing repeated incursions by Sudanese armed groups and growing insecurity near its territory. The decision followed heavy fighting in the border town of al-Tina between the RSF and forces aligned with the Sudanese army, and Chad said limited humanitarian exemptions could still be granted with prior approval.

=== Egypt ===
On 15 April 2023, RSF forces claimed, via Twitter, to have taken Egyptian troops prisoner near Merowe, and a military plane carrying markings of the Egyptian Air Force (EAF). Initially, no official explanation was given for the Egyptian soldiers' presence, while Egypt and Sudan have had military cooperation due to diplomatic tensions with Ethiopia. Later on, the Egyptian Armed Forces stated that around 200 of its soldiers were in Sudan to conduct exercises with the Sudanese military. Around that time, the SAF reportedly encircled RSF forces in Merowe airbase. As a result, the Egyptian Armed Forces announced that it was following the situation as a precaution for the safety of its personnel. The RSF later stated that it would cooperate in repatriating the soldiers to Egypt. On 19 April, the RSF stated that it had moved the soldiers to Khartoum and would hand them over when the "appropriate opportunity" arose. Of the captured Egyptian troops, 177 were released and flown back to Egypt aboard three Egyptian military planes that took off from Khartoum airport later in the day. The remaining 27 soldiers, who were from the Egyptian Air Force, were sheltered at the Egyptian embassy and later evacuated.

On 16 April 2023, the RSF claimed that its troops in Port Sudan were attacked by foreign aircraft and issued a warning against any foreign interference. According to former CIA analyst Cameron Hudson, Egyptian fighter jets were a part of these bombing campaigns against the RSF, and Egyptian special forces units have been deployed and are providing intelligence and tactical support to the SAF. The Wall Street Journal said that Egypt had sent fighter jets and pilots to support the Sudanese military. On 17 April, satellite imagery obtained by The War Zone revealed that one Egyptian Air Force MiG-29M2 fighter jet had been destroyed and two others had been damaged or destroyed while stationed at Merowe Airbase. A Sudanese Air Force Guizhou JL-9 was among the destroyed aircraft. After initial confusion, the RSF accepted the explanation that Egyptian combat and support personnel were conducting exercises with the Sudanese military before the outbreak of hostilities.

Egypt's position is driven primarily by national security concerns, including stability along its southern border, Nile water security, and the regional balance of power. Cairo has long viewed the SAF as its most reliable institutional partner, reflecting decades of cooperation on border security and counterterrorism. As the RSF expanded its capabilities during the war, Egypt increasingly perceived it as a destabilising force, particularly if it advanced toward northern Sudan. These concerns, heightened by tensions with Ethiopia over the Grand Ethiopian Renaissance Dam (GERD), have reinforced Egypt's preference for a unified Sudanese state and its opposition to fragmentation.

Since at least mid-2025, drones launched from an air base in Egypt’s Western Desert, along the border with Sudan, have supported the SAF by striking RSF targets. This marked Egypt’s direct entry into the war; before this, support for the Sudanese government was primarily diplomatic.

=== Ethiopia ===
Ethiopia initially supported the RSF, which was viewed by Addis Ababa as a useful counterweight to both Egyptian influence in Sudan and the SAF, while some reports also described the RSF as having assisted Ethiopia against the Tigray People's Liberation Front during the Tigray War. Relations between Addis Ababa and Khartoum deteriorated sharply after the outbreak of the Sudanese civil war in April 2023, as the government of Abiy Ahmed was increasingly accused by Sudanese officials of indirectly supporting the RSF through cooperation with the United Arab Emirates (UAE). Hemedti visited Ethiopia in December 2023 in an attempt to push for negotiations with the SAF, further fueling speculation regarding Ethiopian ties with the paramilitary group.

In July 2024, Prime Minister Abiy Ahmed traveled to Port Sudan for talks with General al-Burhan, in what observers described as a possible shift in Ethiopia’s position on the conflict. Despite the diplomatic outreach, tensions along the Ethiopia–Sudan border continued to rise. On 4 July 2025, senior Sudanese officials accused Ethiopia of exploiting the civil war by deploying army-backed militias into the disputed Al-Fashaga District, where militias allegedly blocked Sudanese farmers and cleared agricultural land under the protection of the Ethiopian National Defense Force. Sudanese officials further alleged that Ethiopian armed groups crossed into the border district of Al Galabat to loot livestock markets amid a security vacuum created by the redeployment of Sudanese troops to the civil war frontlines.

In February 2026, Reuters reported that Ethiopia was hosting a secret camp in the Benishangul-Gumuz region to train thousands of RSF fighters near the Sudanese border, describing the facility as “the first direct evidence of Ethiopia's involvement” in the war. According to Reuters, eight sources, including a senior Ethiopian government official, alleged that the UAE financed the camp’s construction and supplied military trainers, logistics, and drone infrastructure linked to nearby Asosa airport, while an internal Ethiopian security note reportedly stated that 4,300 fighters were training at the site in January 2026. Reuters and regional analysts also alleged that the airport had become instrumental in supplying the RSF across the border into Sudan.

In May 2026, Sudan formally accused Ethiopia and the UAE of orchestrating drone attacks on Khartoum International Airport and military installations in the capital, describing the strikes as “direct aggression” against Sudanese sovereignty. General al-Burhan alleged that drones used in the attack originated from Bahir Dar airport in Ethiopia and accused the government of Abiy Ahmed of facilitating military assistance to the Rapid Support Forces, including drone support aimed at Khartoum airport. Ethiopia rejected the accusations as “baseless,” while the UAE denied involvement and dismissed the allegations as propaganda.

The accusations deepened fears that the Sudanese civil war had evolved into a wider regional proxy conflict involving Ethiopia, the UAE, Egypt, and Eritrea, with Addis Ababa allegedly viewing the RSF as a counterweight to the SAF’s alignment with Cairo and Asmara. Investigations by Reuters, the BBC, The Guardian, and regional analysts linked the UAE to extensive financial and military backing for the RSF, including alleged arms transfers, logistics networks, and support infrastructure operating through Ethiopian territory.

=== Libyan National Army ===
The Egypt-backed Libyan National Army, under the command of Khalifa Haftar, dispatched aircraft to fly military supplies to the RSF before the outbreak of hostilities. Haftar and the LNA collaborated with the Wagner Group, a Russian private military company, to conduct these flights. Sudan has also accused the LNA of launching joint border attacks with the RSF. Khalifa Haftar has reportedly denied these claims.

Haftar's support for a different faction in Sudan than the Egyptian government was commented on by The New Arab, which viewed it as a sign of Egyptian weakness due to economic malaise and reliance on Haftar to police Eastern Libya, which constitutes a security concern for the Egyptian government. The New Arab also viewed the LNA's role in the conflict as signifying a shift in its diplomatic orientation, from being primarily backed by Egypt to being primarily backed by the United Arab Emirates (UAE).

=== Russia ===
Earlier in the Sudanese civil war, Russia sent weapons to both the RSF and SAF. This began to shift during mid-2024, with the Russian government beginning to favour the SAF, concurrent with Russia–SAF discussions around the construction of a Russian naval base north of Port Sudan. The same year, Russia began delivering large quantities of weapons, jet components, fuel, and drones to the Sudanese government in its effort against the RSF, allowing the SAF to recapture parts of the capital, Khartoum, from the RSF.

Russia's involvement is also driven by broader strategic and economic interests, including efforts to secure a naval presence on the Red Sea and access to Sudanese gold resources. These resources have been particularly valuable in mitigating the impact of Western sanctions. In addition to its military engagement, Russia has used its diplomatic position, including at the United Nations, to protect its interests and resist ceasefire initiatives.

==== Wagner Group ====
According to CNN, Wagner supplied surface-to-air missiles to the RSF, picking up the items from Syria and delivering some of them by plane to Haftar-controlled bases in Libya to be then delivered to the RSF, while dropping other items directly to RSF positions in northwestern Sudan. American officials said that Wagner was offering to supply additional weapons to the RSF from its existing stocks in the Central African Republic (CAR). On 6 September 2023, Wagner reportedly deployed a convoy of more than 100 vehicles carrying weapons to the RSF garrison in al-Zurug from Chad. SAF Lieutenant General Yasser al-Atta also accused the Wagner Group of bringing in mercenaries from several African nations to fight alongside the RSF. The head of the Wagner Group, Yevgeny Prigozhin, and the RSF denied the allegations.

As relations between the Russian government and the SAF improved during mid-2024, the latter publicly claimed that the Wagner Group was no longer operating in Sudan. This claim was contradicted by a diplomatic source and eyewitnesses speaking to Middle East Eye (MEE).

=== Saudi Arabia ===
Saudi Arabia has provided military support and financial aid to the SAF, although it officially denies doing so, in an effort to counterbalance the influence of the UAE, which supports the RSF. Several analyses have consequently described the conflict as a proxy war between the two Gulf states.

Saudi Arabia's engagement is also shaped by security concerns related to the Red Sea crisis and a preference for a unified Sudanese state capable of containing armed groups and preventing regional spillover. Saudi policy has remained broadly aligned with the SAF and coordinated with Egypt, reflecting shared concerns over fragmentation and border instability. Its support has largely taken diplomatic and political forms, avoiding direct military escalation.

In March 2025, al-Burhan visited Saudi Arabia in his first trip outside Sudan since the SAF retook Khartoum. There, he thanked Saudi support for Sudanese unity and the fight against the RSF.

=== South Sudan ===
Since the outbreak of renewed violence in Sudan in 2023, South Sudan has adopted a mediatory role, urging peace and engaging with IGAD and the AU, though with limited success due to the conflict's complexity and multiple factions. South Sudan is deeply concerned about spillover effects—such as refugee flows and economic instability—and recognizes that its own fragile stability is tied to Sudan's fate. Tensions escalated further with a February 2025 alliance between Sudan's RSF and the SPLM–N, a rebel group near the South Sudanese border. Experts warn this could pull South Sudan into the conflict, especially if the Sudanese Army supports rival South Sudanese militias in response. With shared borders, historical ties, and existing political tensions between South Sudan's leaders (President Salva Kiir and Vice President Riek Machar), the risk of both wars merging is high. The strategic location of the RSF-SPLM–N alliance also boosts smuggling and military operations, weakening the Sudanese Army and increasing regional instability. If left unchecked, experts fear the two conflicts could become indistinguishable, worsening humanitarian crises in both countries.

=== Turkey ===
Turkey's engagement reflects a combination of strategic ambition and commercial interests in Sudan and the wider Red Sea region. In addition to its role as a security partner, Ankara has sought to expand its economic footprint, including potential access to mineral resources and port infrastructure. This dual approach, combining defence cooperation with diplomatic outreach, has allowed Turkey to increase its influence while maintaining flexibility in its relations with different actors.

Turkey appears to be engaging with both sides, notably through Baykar, owned by President Recep Tayyip Erdoğan's son-in-law, selling $120 million worth of weapons, 6 TB2 UCAV's, 3 ground control stations, 600 warheads to the SAF in 2023, violating US and EU sanctions. Meanwhile, Arca Defense, another Turkish company, had extensive contact with RSF's procurement officer, though it denies selling weapons, adding complexity to Turkey's role. Turkey's interests include expanding military and diplomatic ties in the Horn of Africa, offering to mediate between Sudan and the UAE in December 2024.

In January 2025, the Somali government agreed to host SAF troops at Camp TURKSOM for training, as part of a Turkish-led effort to bolster military support to the SAF.

=== United Arab Emirates ===
The UAE has faced mounting accusations of providing military support to RSF, including covert arms transfers, drone supply, and logistics routed through Chad, Libya, CAR, and South Sudan. Reports by major outlets like the Wall Street Journal (WSJ), New York Times (NYT), The Guardian, and BBC, along with diplomatic sources and satellite evidence, suggest Emirati cargo planes delivered weapons disguised as aid, with operations coordinated through Amdjarass airport in Chad. UAE denied the accusations.

Sudan expelled Emirati diplomats, accused the UAE at the UN of aiding genocide, and submitted complaints to the International Criminal Court and the International Court of Justice (ICJ). The residence of the UAE ambassador to Sudan in Khartoum was also attacked on 29 September 2024. The UAE was accused of using humanitarian cover such as Red Crescent hospitals for military purposes, including drone operations and weapon bunkers near the border. Sudan claimed these actions aimed to maintain Emirati influence and gold interests in Sudan, backed by historical investments and ongoing port and agriculture projects.

The UAE's ties to the RSF date back to the Yemeni civil war in 2018. Its involvement is said to include cooperation with the Wagner Group for arms deliveries and financing RSF logistics from within the Emirates. Identity documents recovered from a 2024 plane crash in Sudan included a Russian passport and an ID that linked to a UAE-based company.

The US and the UK have called on the UAE to halt support, with US lawmakers introducing multiple bills to block arms sales to Abu Dhabi. The EU and Human Rights Watch also demanded accountability. Emirati diplomatic initiatives toward Sudan continued, such as hosting a humanitarian conference and pledging $200 million aid—actions seen by Sudan as attempts by UAE to improve its image.

On 30 April 2025 UAE authorities said they had intercepted millions of rounds of ammunition at an airport in the UAE which was being illegally transferred to the SAF, which the latter denied.

Sudan opened a case at the International Court of Justice (ICJ) accusing the UAE of breaching the Genocide Convention by arming and funding the Rapid Support Forces. The court hearings began on 10 April 2025. On 5 May, the court dismissed the case, stating it "manifestly lacks" the authority to continue the proceedings, as the UAE holds a carveout to the provision of the Genocide Convention that grants the court jurisdiction over such cases.

Since the beginning of the Sudanese war, the UAE has been using the Bosaso International Airport Co (BIAC) as a key logistical hub to supply the RSF with arms and mercenaries. Due to its strategic location and the UAE's close ties with Puntland's leadership, Bosaso Airport serves as a crucial transit point for Emirati weapons and Colombian paramilitaries affiliated with Abu Dhabi's Global Security Service Group (GSSG) to Sudan. In September 2025, Sudan urged Somalia to cease the operations taking place in Bosaso.

Sudan's Foreign Ministry accused the UAE of making "desperate efforts" at the Non-Aligned Movement meetings to protect the RSF from condemnation and undercut international solidarity with Sudan. The Ministry said Abu Dhabi should not be allowed to exploit global forums, citing its suggestion of an alternative government.

In August 2025, the Sudanese government released a statement accusing regional and international communities of targeting Sudan and supporting the RSF's aggression. It further claimed that the presence of numerous foreign mercenaries posed a significant threat to the nation's peace and security. The government asserted that it possessed undeniable evidence showing that UAE authorities had sponsored and financed mercenaries from Colombia and other neighboring countries.

The UAE is the primary purchaser of Sudanese gold from RSF-controlled areas. Through UAE's economic networks gold is channeled from Darfur and other conflict zones into global markets, generating liquidity and linking the RSF to transnational brokerage networks. Flexible, informal channels help move supplies, personnel and capital, sustaining the RSF's military capacity and its political relevance.

In May 2026, Human Rights Watch (HRW) reported that Global Security Services Group (GSSG), an Abu Dhabi-based security company with links to senior UAE officials, appeared to have hired Colombian private military contractors who were deployed to fight alongside the RSF in Sudan. HRW found evidence that the contractors had passed through at least two UAE military facilities before travelling to Sudan. One contractor told HRW that he had received training from Emirati nationals at one of the bases. HRW also cited accounts from residents who reported seeing foreign fighters it believed to be Colombian in El Fasher during the RSF's takeover of the city in October 2025. HRW said that UAE military support to the RSF, including the recruitment and deployment of contractors through a company acting as its proxy, could constitute aiding and abetting, or otherwise substantially contributing to, war crimes and crimes against humanity committed by the group.

In September 2026, the UN Independent International Fact-Finding Mission for Sudan reported that a transnational network involving individuals and entities operating from the UAE, Chad, southeastern Libya and Puntland had facilitated the transfer of foreign personnel, training and logistical support to areas held by the RSF. The mission also found that former Colombian military personnel had been recruited, trained and deployed to support the group, including during its takeover of El Fasher. It said that continued external support was strengthening the military capabilities of the warring parties and raising concerns about the responsibility of those who knowingly facilitated violations of international law.

=== United States ===
On 20 January 2025, the Trump administration froze USAID payments for 90 days, redirecting most funds to military aid. This resulted in the closure of hundreds of soup kitchens, and increased deaths from starvation. A court ordered the freeze lifted on 13 February, but the administration cancelled nearly 10,000 aid contracts instead. The judge later demanded payments by 26 February, but Chief Justice John G. Roberts paused the order pending a Supreme Court ruling by 28 February.

The US announced a diplomatic meeting of the International Quartet on Sudan, aiming to develop a unified vision to end the war, stop foreign involvement and secure a ceasefire. Scheduled for 29 July 2025 in Washington D.C., the meeting was to include the United States, Saudi Arabia, the UAE and Egypt. However, it was postponed at the last minute. Meanwhile, a coalition of Sudanese political parties rejected the UAE as a mediator, calling it "morally unqualified" due to its backing of the RSF.

A 2026 Reuters investigation found that US Special Forces veteran and government contractor Steven Shaulis had operated at least three planes servicing "key" RSF logistics hubs—two operating since at least October 2024—possibly in violation of international sanctions. The planes flew along supply lines used by the RSF to carry out the siege and capture of El Fasher.

== Humanitarian impact ==
The war has triggered a severe humanitarian crisis. Within days into the fighting, communities faced severe shortages of food, water, medical supplies and fuel, with Khartoum and its surroundings hit hardest. In the first months of the war, about 25 million people out of a population of roughly 50 million, required humanitarian assistance. Aid delivery was hampered as supplies were looted. By September 2024, roughly 80% of healthcare facilities in Sudan were no longer functional. In October 2025, the World Health Organization (WHO) relayed reports that over 450 people had been massacred in El Fasher's last functioning hospital. WHO director general Tedros Adhanom Ghebreyesus declared in 2026 that 2,036 people had been killed in 231 healthcare-related attacks.

=== Displacement ===
The conflict has forcibly displaced nearly 12 million people inside and outside Sudan, making it one of the largest displacement crises in recent history. By April 2025, the famine in Sudan had severely affected nearly 25 million people, including nearly 4 million acutely malnourished children under the age of five. By September 2025, the number of people requiring humanitarian aid had increased to 30.4 million. Fatality figures remained highly uncertain, with some assessments suggesting the true number may exceed 150,000.

== Analysis ==
=== 2024 ===
Kholood Khair, director of policy organization Confluence Advisory, analyzed the conflict as unfolding simultaneously at a local, national, and regional level.

- At the local level, she stated that much of the violence is shaped by factors specific to individual communities and unresolved grievances predating the current war, resulting in localized and often retaliatory forms of violence. Alex de Waal added that the combatants displayed an extreme brutality, arguing that the conduct of fighters reflected not only a sense of impunity, but also had devastating consequences for Sudanese society.
- At the national level, Khair described the conflict primarily as a struggle between the Sudanese Armed Forces and the Rapid Support Forces, alongside a range of militias and civilian actors aligned with either side. This dimension has attracted the greatest international attention.
- Khair further identified an international dimension, in which Sudan had become entangled in broader geopolitical rivalries. She described the conflict as intersecting with competition between regional groupings, including states aligned with Saudi Arabia, Qatar, Turkey, and Egypt on one side, and a bloc associated with the United Arab Emirates and Israel on the other. However, according to Khair, Sudan had not become a priority issue in high-level international diplomacy, and was rarely discussed.

=== 2026 ===
A 2026 policy analysis identifies three main scenarios for the trajectory of the war: a continued stalemate leading to de facto territorial fragmentation, a negotiated settlement driven by shifts in external support, or a decisive military breakthrough followed by renewed instability and reprisals. The analysis argues that the relative likelihood of each scenario depends on the interaction between internal fragmentation and the strategic calculations of external actors.

== Economy ==
=== 2023–2024 ===
Sudan's economy was seriously damaged by the conflict, with a near standstill in formal economic activity, particularly in Khartoum and parts of Darfur.

The economy contracted heavily in 2023 and was expected to shrink further in 2024, while state revenues declined steeply. Currency depreciation accelerated, international trade dropped, and gold production fell sharply amid allegations of large scale looting. The fighting also rendered more than 60% of Sudan's agricultural land out of service. By 2024, both warring parties were reported to be financing their operations partly through the sale of gum arabic.

== Disinformation ==
Throughout the Sudan conflict, the RSF have waged disinformation campaigns, using social media to manipulate public opinion, spread narratives and deny the massacres that are still happening. The RSF ran digital propaganda teams from Khartoum and Dubai, using verified social media accounts to distribute misleading content. The RSF were verified on Twitter and has launched a disinformation campaign against the SAF, accusing them of attacking civilians. The SAF used Twitter for morale-boosting and to counter RSF claims, though some posts were proven false.

Widespread disinformation included recycled footage from video games, past conflicts like Ukraine and Libya, and even archaeological props misrepresented as war crimes. For instance, the SAF posted a video allegedly showing recent air operations, which was actually from the video game Arma 3. The SAF also circulated altered images, including a fabricated photo of Hemedti hospitalized in Nairobi.

The RSF shared footage of an alleged SAF and Egyptian Air Force (EAF) warplane reportedly shot down by the RSF found to be that of an Su-25 fighter jet that crashed in Mali, and the other of a Libyan aircraft taken outside Sudan in 2020.

The RSF also sent bulletins to UK politicians with the help of Dubai-based Capital Tap Holdings, aiming to counter what it called "disproportionate" disinformation. Facebook removed RSF pages in August 2024, citing policy violations. The RSF blamed the SAF for instigating the ban and said it was negotiating with Meta to restore its accounts.

The conflict's information space has been further destabilized by false claims against organizations like the Sudanese Doctors Syndicate (SDU) and by deepfake-like imagery. Disinformation experts, including Kyle Walter of Logically, warned that generative AI may be fueling the sophistication of fake content, undermining trust in all sources of information.

=== El Fasher ===
After El Fasher was captured by the RSF, according to Middle East Eye, Emirati, Israeli, and far-right influencers tried to falsely frame the conflict as a sectarian one where Islamists were committing genocide against Christians.

== Sanctions ==
=== United States ===
U.S. president Joe Biden issued an executive order on 4 May 2023 authorizing sanctions against actors destabilizing the country. The first sanctions followed in June, targeting companies linked to both the SAF and RSF, along with visa restrictions on unnamed individuals. Subsequent rounds of sanctions included RSF leaders Abdul Rahim Dagalo and Abdel Rahman Jumma (accused of killing West Darfur's governor), Islamist leader Ali Karti, firms in Sudan and Russia, and former Bashir regime officials involved in RSF support or coup plots. In May 2024, more RSF commanders were sanctioned for violence in North and Central Darfur. On 7 January 2025, the U.S. said it had determined that the RSF and allied militias committed genocide in Sudan and imposed sanctions on RSF leader Hemedti and affiliated entities to hold them accountable for systematic atrocities and reaffirmed support for Sudanese civil society and a peaceful, democratic future. However, critics said the measures came too late and would have limited impact. On 22 May 2025, the U.S. announced new sanctions on Sudan over the SAF's use of chemical weapons against the RSF.

=== United Arab Emirates ===
One affiliated entity that received sanctions was a UAE LLC; according to Watan, in response, the UAE began lobbying in Washington to avoid direct sanctions. The UAE launched an investigation into the entities and reported that none of these seven companies hold a valid commercial license in the UAE or conduct any business activities within the country.

=== United Kingdom ===
On 12 July 2023, the United Kingdom announced sanctions on firms linked to the SAF and the RSF.

=== Canada ===
On 15 April 2024, Canada imposed sanctions on two individuals and four entities linked to the SAF and the RSF. On 6 March 2025, Canada imposed sanctions on al-Burhan and Hemedti, due to "an unwillingness on the part of the leaders to negotiate an end to the war".

=== European Union ===
On 23 June 2024, the European Union (EU) imposed sanctions on six entities for manufacturing and procuring weapons for the SAF and the RSF. On 18 July 2025, the European Council (EUCO) adopted a fourth package of restrictive measures against two individuals and two entities, Alkhaleej Bank and Red Rock Mining Company.

=== Australia ===
On 5 November 2026, Australia imposed sanctions on al-Burhan, Hemedti, RSF officials Hussein Barsham and Al-Tijani Karshoum, and the Al-Bara' ibn Malik Battalion, citing their role in human rights abuses during the conflict.

== In popular culture ==
=== 2023–present ===
- Sudan, Remember Us, a 2024 documentary film directed by Hind Meddeb
- Khartoum, a 2025 documentary film by several Sudanese filmmakers
- Nothing Happens After Your Absence, a 2026 short film by Ibrahim Omar

== See also ==
=== General links ===
- Sudanese Civil War—An index (disambiguation page) of three major civil wars that have occurred in Sudan's history, as well as other separate conflicts in Sudan
- 2021 Sudanese coup d'état
- Democracy in Africa
- Human rights in Sudan
- Janjaweed coalition
- Next Sudanese general election
- New Sudan—Proposal for restructuring Sudan
- Sudan Information Warfare (2023-present)
- Sudanese National Forces Coordination—Coalition of armed groups
- War in Darfur—Genocidal conflict in Western Sudan
  - Genocide of Indigenous peoples § Darfur
  - Genocides in history (21st century) § Darfur

=== Lists ===
- List of conflicts in Africa
- List of ethnic cleansing campaigns
- List of genocides
- List of non-international armed conflicts
- List of ongoing armed conflicts
- List of wars: 2020–present

=== Timelines ===
- Timelines of the Sudanese civil war
  - Timeline of the Sudanese civil war (2023)
  - Timeline of the Sudanese civil war (2024)
  - Timeline of the Sudanese civil war (2025)
  - Timeline of the Sudanese civil war (2026)
