= Vatan =

Vatan may refer to:

== Places ==
- Canton of Vatan, a former canton in the Indre department in France
- Vatan, Indre, a commune in the Indre department in France
- Vatan, Iran, a village in Golestan Province, Iran
- Vatan, Farkhor District, a town and jamoat in Tajikistan
- Vatan, a neighbourhood of Bayrampaşa, Istanbul, Turkey

== People ==
- Merve Vatan (born 2005), Turkish wındsurfer
- Vatan Huseynli, Azerbaijani boxer
- Bijan Nobaveh-Vatan, Iranian anchorman and conservative politician
- Sinem Vatan Güney (born 1996), Turkish female handball player

== Politics ==
- Patriotic Party (Turkey) (Turkish: Vatan Partisi), a political party in Turkey
- Vatan ve Hürriyet, a Turkish revolutionary society in the early 20th century

== Media ==
- Vatan (1923 newspaper), a Turkish newspaper published 1923-1925, and 1940-1978
- Vatan (2002 newspaper), a Turkish newspaper published 2002–2018
- Vatan (Dagestani newspaper), a Judeo-Tat and Russian-language newspaper founded in 1928

== Others ==
- Vatan, an opera by Gara Garayev
- Vatan Aur Desh, the first of the two volumes of the novel Jhutha Sach by the author Yashpal

== See also ==
- Watan (disambiguation)
