= Sudanese National Forces Coordination =

Coalition of armed groups

Sudanese National Forces Coordination (NFC)
- تنسيق القوى الوطنية السودانية
- Founder: Malik Agar
- Dates active: Since March 8, 2024
- Country: Sudan
- Allegiance: Government of Sudan
- Wars: War in Sudan (2023–present)

The Sudanese National Forces Coordination is a coalition consisting of armed groups that are supportive of the Sudanese Armed Forces. The group is currently led by Malik Agar, the current vice president of the Transitional Sovereignty Council. The group was created on March 8, 2024, and met with army commander Abdel Fattah al-Burhan on March 15, 2024.
