= Ismatullah Muslim =

Afghan militia leader

Ismatullah Muslim Khan Achakzai
- عصمت الله مسلم خان اچکزی
- Born: 1943; Kandahar, Kingdom of Afghanistan
- Died: 1991 (aged 47–48)
- Military career
- Branch: Afghan Armed Forces
- Nickname: Ismat
- Conflicts: Soviet-Afghan War; Afghan Civil War (1989–1992)

General Ismatullah Muslim Achakzai (Pashto: عصمت الله مسلم اچکزی; 1943 – 1991) also known as Ismat, was an Afghan militia leader, who in 1979 joined the mujahideen opposed to the communist PDPA and the Soviet invasion of Afghanistan, before coming over to the side of the government in 1984. Despite his military successes, Ismatullah Muslim was known for the many abuses he committed against civilians, made him a much hated figure throughout Afghanistan, except within his own Pashtun Achakzai tribe.

== Early life ==
Ismatullah, an Achakzai Pashtun, was born in 1943 in southern Kandahar, rose to the rank of major in the Afghan army, after having undergone training in the Soviet Union.

== Rebel leader ==
Warriors of Islam Fidayan-i Islam
- Leader: Ismat Muslim
- Founder: Ismat Muslim
- Founded: 1979
- Dissolved: 1983
- Preceded by: Khalq
- Succeeded by: Pader Watan
- Ideology: Anti-capitalism; Anti-Imperialism; Anti-Sovietism; Democratic socialism Left-wing populism Islamic socialism Pashtun nationalism (Left-wing nationalism); Marxism-Leninism-Maoism; Progressivism; Revolutionary socialism Secularism; Social democracy
- Political position: Left-wing
- Colors: Black; White; Red; Green

In 1979 he led his tribe to join the mujahideen resistance against the communist Democratic Republic of Afghanistan, and due to his important tribal following, became one of the principal mujahideen commanders in the Kandahar area. As well as military operations, he also perpetuated the tribal tradition of smuggling various goods across the border, including heroin.

In 1983, the Pakistani Inter-Services Intelligence, which channeled international support for the insurgency, discovered that Ismatullah had compromised almost all of its agents in Quetta in a drug and weapon smuggling network. This led to a major reorganisation of the distribution of supplies to the mujahideen: in order to receive weapons all commanders were required to become affiliated with one of the resistance parties based in Peshawar.

Refusing to join any party, Ismatullah instead formed his own group, called the Fidayan-i islam. In 1984, having been cut off from the ISI weapons pipeline, he started attacking and ransoming arms convoys destined for other mujahideen formations. These groups retaliated, and heavy fighting broke out before the ISI managed to arrange a ceasefire. After he had turned to threatening Pakistani diplomatic personnel, the ISI's commander, General Akhtar Abdur Rahman, summoned him to Islamabad where he agreed to join Sayyed Ahmed Gailani's party, in exchange for a delivery of weapons. However, the ISI refused to give him any heavy weapons, and soon began to suspect him of being an agent of the KHAD or the KGB. Having got wind of his imminent arrest, Ismatullah fled to Kabul and defected to the government.

== Pro-government militia leader ==
Upon joining the PDPA government, he was made a general, and in January 1986, he was given a seat on the Revolutionary Council. His militia numbered at first a few hundred, but by 1988 it had risen to several thousand(between 3,000 and 10,000 depending on sources) and was equipped with armoured cars and heavy weapons. He remained popular among his own tribesmen, with a total number of supporters estimated at 50,000. With their headquarters in the strategic border town of Spin Boldak, his forces were charged with guarding the road from there to Kandahar. Sitting astride mujahideen supply lines, they were particularly active against the resistance, inflicting casualties and capturing supply convoys. Ismatullah financed his military force through government payments, smuggling and by levying tolls on the busy traffic to Kandahar. In Kabul, he owned a large house where he held many parties involving the heavy use of drugs, alcohol and prostitutes. He was widely believed to have personally murdered hundreds of civilians, including popular singer Ubaidullah Jan while his forces were frequently accused of torture and rape. A US diplomat once witnessed him torturing a prisoner in his garden. When president Mohammad Najibullah convened a Loya jirga in November 1987, Ismatullah tried to enter the hall sided with armed bodyguards. A firefight broke out, in which Ismatullah was wounded. The next day, Najibullah remarked scathingly of him: "Unfortunately he is sick. He goes to extremes in using narcotics, and it is these which cause his illness". Following this incident, Ismatullah was placed under house arrest, but was later released, reportedly after some of his men took hostage several WAD operatives on the road to his stronghold of Spin Boldak.

Ismatullah later tried to regain the ISI's favour, but the Pakistanis refused to return his property which they had confiscated when he changed sides, including two Mercedes-Benz cars, and the proposal came to nothing. After the Soviets had withdrawn from southern Afghanistan in 1988, his militia suffered a bloody reverse, and he lost control of Spin Boldak to an ISI-sponsored mujahideen offensive. He died in 1991 in a Soviet hospital, presumably from the effects of drug and alcohol abuse. His tribal militia continued to exist and in 2001, led by his nephews, they supported Gul Agha Sherzai. It was later reformed as a border guard unit in Spin Boldak.

== See also ==
- Gul Agha Sherzai
- Abdul Raziq Achakzai
