= 2026 Nyala market strike =

Event in the Sudanese Civil War

- Location: Tangong Market, Nyala, South Darfur, Sudan
- Date: 26 October 2026
- Target: Civilians/RSF militia(Disputed)
- Attack type: Drone strike
- Deaths: 21–102 (disputed)
- Injuries: 40–150 (disputed)
- Perpetrator: Sudanese Armed Forces (alleged)

On 26 October 2026, a Loitering munition strike was carried out in Tangong Market in Nyala, the de facto capital of the Rapid Support Forces by the Sudanese Armed Forces. According to the regional observers and health officials, 102 people were killed in the strike and more than a hundred were injured. The attack occurred on approximately 8:00 PM in Sudanese Local Time at evening.

== Background & Attack ==
Nyala serves as the de facto capital and major administrative hub in the RSF-controlled Darfur territories in the ongoing Sudanese Civil War. Due to the strategic importance of Nyala, it had also been the target for earlier drone strikes in Mid-October. A spokesperson for army-allied forces said a strike in the Dumaya area had killed more than 150 "militia recruits". While the majority of the dead were civilians, eyewitnesses stated that RSF fighters were also present at the market at the time of the strike. According to regional outlets, the market area was a common assembly point for RSF fighters prior to their deployment. Shortly after the strike on Tangong Market, another drone attack occurred at a nearby residential neighborhood. Doctors Without Borders (MSF) stated that the Nyala teaching hospital received 36 bodies after the strike and that only 21 of them were in civilian clothing, and that women and children were among the wounded. The drone carried a large amount of explosive in it as sources describe the initial blast as Massive and Large-scale. The explosion also caused commercial and financial loss to the shopkeepers as the explosion triggered fires in the market and burned stalls. Thick smoke was seen rising from the location of the strike.

== Reactions & Aftermath ==
Emergency Lawyers condemned the strike as a massacre, and MSF urged protection for civilians. The RSF launched widespread retaliatory drone strikes across Sudan which began from 27 October. These RSF heavily targeted power station and electricity substations. These retaliatory strikes affected multiple states including strikes in Sennar, Gedaref, Gezira, Abu Hamad, and Al-Dabbah, reports indicate that over 90 percent of the power stations in affected Sudanese cities have been rendered out of service. On 31 October, UN secretary condemned the escalating drone strikes and attacks on civilian infrastructure, he urged both sides in the conflict to restrain from targeting civilians and civilian infrastructure.
