= Sudan Information Warfare (2023-present) =

Use of information warfare in the ongoing Sudanese civil war

Sudan information warfare (2023–present) refers to the use of information warfare, disinformation, and digital communication strategies during the Sudan conflict, which began in April 2023 between the Sudanese Armed Forces (SAF) and the Rapid Support Forces (RSF).

According to a 2026 analysis by Forbes, the conflict has included a “war of information,” involving coordinated disinformation campaigns, competing narratives, and digital propaganda efforts. Reports by the Thomson Foundation and Internews have described the information environment as a parallel arena of conflict in which actors seek to influence public perception, mobilise support, and discredit opponents.

Research has also identified the use of hate speech and identity-based narratives within online interactions. The Media Diversity Institute reported that disinformation in Sudan has included content that dehumanises ethnic groups and contributes to social tensions.

== Background ==
The Sudan conflict began in April 2023 following a breakdown in political negotiations between the SAF and RSF. Fighting spread rapidly across multiple regions, causing rifts in governance, communications infrastructure, and media systems.

International reporting by Reuters and the Associated Press indicates that the conflict extended into the digital sphere as traditional information channels weakened. As access to verified information declined, civilians increasingly relied on social media platforms and informal networks for news and updates.

== Actors ==
The primary actors in Sudan's information warfare include the SAF and RSF, both of which have been reported to operate coordinated communication strategies. The Thomson Foundation reported that these groups disseminate narratives designed to influence domestic and international audiences, including claims about battlefield developments and political legitimacy.

Internews reported that supporters, influencers, and diaspora communities also play a role in amplifying these narratives through digital platforms, contributing to the spread and reinforcement of competing claims.

== Tactics and methods ==
=== Disinformation campaigns ===
Disinformation has been widely documented during the conflict. The fact-checking organisation Misbar identified multiple instances of recycled or misleading visual content being presented as current events in Sudan, including footage from unrelated conflicts.

=== Social media manipulation ===
Social media platforms such as Facebook, X, and WhatsApp have been central to the dissemination of information. Internews described the online environment as a “parallel battlefield” in which competing narratives are actively promoted and contested.

=== AI-generated and manipulated content ===
Reports indicate the use of artificial intelligence tools to create or alter content, including fabricated images and videos. The Thomson Foundation noted that such materials can be difficult to verify and may spread rapidly across digital platforms.

=== Hate speech and incitement ===
The Media Diversity Institute documented the presence of ethnic and identity-based hate speech within online narratives, which has contributed to heightened tensions in some areas.

== Media environment ==
The media landscape in Sudan has been significantly affected by the conflict. Internews reported that many traditional media outlets have been disrupted, damaged, or forced to cease operations.

According to Reporters Without Borders, journalists have faced threats, displacement, and restrictions, limiting independent reporting and reducing the availability of verified information.

== Impact ==
Information warfare has influenced both public perception and conditions on the ground. United Nations reporting and international media coverage indicate that misinformation has contributed to confusion, fear, and, in some cases, violence.

The Thomson Foundation reported that disinformation can influence civilian behavior and contribute to instability, particularly in areas with limited access to reliable information.

== International response ==
International organizations and advocacy groups have raised concerns about the role of information warfare in Sudan. ARTICLE 19 and Reporters Without Borders have called for stronger protections for freedom of expression and support for independent journalism.

The United Nations has emphasised the importance of accurate information in conflict settings and has documented the consequences of incitement and misinformation.
