= Natto (disambiguation) =

Natto is a Japanese food made from fermented soybeans.

Natto may also refer to:

- Bacillus natto (B. natto), a gram-positive bacteria
- Natto Wada (1920-1983), Japanese screenwriter
- Mimi Natto (mangaka), Japanese author published in Monthly Magazine Z
- Kapi Natto MBE, a Papua New Guinea person honoured at the 2009 Birthday Honours
- John Kappi Natto, president of the Papua New Guinea Football Association
- NUT (studio) (Japanese: ナット, romanized: Natto) Japanese animation studio

== See also ==
- Nato (disambiguation)
