= Gezira State canal killings =

Sudanese Civil War event

- Part of Sudanese Civil War
- Gezira State canal killings (Sudan)
- Location: 14°24′N 33°31′E; Wad Medani
- Date: January 2025
- Target: Non-Arab ethnic groups
- Attack type: Extrajudicial Killings; Executions
- Perpetrators: Sudanese Armed Forces; Sudan Shield Forces; Al-Bara' ibn Malik Battalion

The Gezira State Canals killings were attacks committed against the civilian population of Gezira state during the Sudanese Civil War. The attacks took place after the capture of Wad Madani by the Sudanese Armed Forces (SAF) late 2024 to early 2025. The attacks were committed by the SAF and paramilitaries affiliated with the SAF like the Sudan Shield Forces (SSF) and al-Bara' ibn Malik battalion.

== Background ==
The Sudanese Civil War ignited in April 2023 and it was fought between the SAF and a paramilitary force Rapid Support Forces (RSF). The capital of Gezira State, Wad Madani, was captured by the RSF on December 19, 2023. During the occupation of Wad Manadi RSF was accused of multiple human rights violations including sexual violence, extrajudicial killings and looting. Wad Madani was captured by the SAF forces on 12 January 2025.

== The killings ==
After the capturing of Wad Madani, SAF declared a "cleanup operation" of the city. According to the investigation conducted by CNN and Lighthouse reports SAF and SSF targeted non-Arab civilians in Gezira under the pretext of the civilians having collaborated with the RSF. According to the investigation especially minorities from the Kanabi ethnic group were targeted along with South Sudanese migrant farm workers. Some of the civilians had their hands tied behind their back indicating execution style killings. The corpses were dumped in to the canals and irrigation ditches near Wad Medina indicating an effort to conceal the killings.

== Reactions ==
Jaafar Mohamedein the Secretary-General of Kanabi Congress accused the SSF and SAF of sexual violence and attacks against Kanabi civilians. The US special Envoy for Sudan Tom Perriello described the attacks as "appalling" and called for SAF to investigate the killings. The UN high commissioner for Human Rights, Volker Türk called for the end of "retaliatory attacks" against ethnic groups and noted that the attacks would be investigated. The SSF stated that "their forces are not targeting civilians based on their ethnicity" and that their troops "strictly adhere to the rules of their engagement and International Humanitarian Law".
