= Desert Wolves =

Private battalion

The Desert Wolves Operations Battalion (Spanish: Batallón de Operaciones “Lobos del Desierto”) are a private mercenary battalion of retired Colombian Armed Forces personnel fighting alongside the Rapid Support Forces (RSF) in the ongoing Sudanese civil war. It consists of four companies comprising between 300 and 400 men in total. The first company arrived in El Fasher, North Darfur, in November 2024.

According to the Noticias Caracol news program, the battalion was recruited by private military companies including the security contractor Global Security Service Group in the United Arab Emirates under the coordination of Álvaro Quijano, a retired colonel of the Colombian Army. According to Sudan Events, Emirati firms have previously deployed Colombian ex-soldiers in Yemen, Libya, and Somalia. Responding to accusations from Sudanese government authorities, a UAE official denied the allegations and called them fabricated.

Reportedly, the mercenaries were tricked into fighting for the RSF in Sudan under the pretense of providing security to oil-drilling sites.
