= Neato =

Neato may refer to:

- Neato (spider), a genus of spider
- The neato command line tool, part of the Graphviz software package
- Neato Robotics, a former manufacturer of robotic vacuum cleaners
- Northeast Asia Treaty Organization, the proposed military alliance organization
- "Neato", a 2012 song by Three Loco
