= Mustafa Tambour =

Leader of a faction of the Sudan Liberation Movement

- مصطفى تمبور

Personal details
- Born: 24 July 1982 (age 44) Zalingei, Central Darfur, Democratic Republic of Sudan
- Relatives: Motwakel (brother)

Military service
- Allegiance: Sudan Liberation Movement (al-Nur) (until 2018); Sudan Liberation Movement (Tambour)
- Battles/wars: War in Darfur; Sudanese civil war (2023–present): Darfur campaign (2023-present)

Mustafa Nasr Aldin Tambour (Arabic: مصطفى تمبور; born 24 July 1982) is the leader of the Sudan Liberation Movement faction known as SLM-Tambour, which is involved in the conflict in Darfur, supporting the Sudanese Armed Forces (SAF) against the Rapid Support Forces (RSF). Before the 2023 Sudan conflict, he launched a community reconciliation initiative to stop the war in Darfur.

== Early life and education ==
Mustafa Nasr Aldin Tambour was born on 24 July 1982 in Zalingei, Central Darfur, Sudan. He studied law at the Neelain University in 2007.

== Career ==
Tambour survived an assassination attempt on 2 September 2017 near Zalingei by a squad of seven individuals led by two officers with the rank of lieutenant, one of whom was a member of the Special Forces of the Security Police and the other from the Rapid Support Forces (RSF). In the attempt, his mother, brother, and sister were injured.

=== Split from SLM ===
The Sudan Liberation Movement (SLM) faction led by Tambour split in 2018 from the SLM led by Abdul Wahid al Nur, which had been fighting in Darfur since 2003.

Tambour's faction signed the 2020 Juba Peace Agreement in South Sudan and continued to make efforts to achieve security and stability in the country. On 12 June 2022, Tambour launched a community reconciliation initiative to stop the Darfur conflict, specifically in the states of West and South Darfur. The initiative aimed at reconciling all components and tribes of Darfur and resolving conflicts.

On 3 February 2023, Tambour welcomed the visit of the Israeli delegation to Sudan. He also on 6 January 2023 affirmed that his forces are ready to engage in the security arrangements in preparation for their full integration into the Sudanese Armed Forces (SAF).

=== 2023 Sudan conflict ===
During the 2023 Sudan conflict, Tambour's house in Riyadh, Khartoum was raided on 8 May 2023. On 17 July, the RSF assassinated one of his brothers, Motwakel, on the Nyala-Zalingei road.

On 31 July, the SLM-Tambour faction pledged its support to the SAF in their efforts against the RSF. During the siege of Zalingei, the capital of Central Darfur, the SLM-Tambour inflicted casualties on the RSF paramilitary forces, killing 27 RSF, injuring 41, and capturing 14 militants.

On 13 September 2025, the SLM-Tambour faction accused the RSF of attempting to assassinate Tambour following a drone attack on El Obeid.
