= Watan Group =

Company based in Afghanistan

Watan Group (translates as Nation Group) is a company based in Afghanistan that provides telecommunications, logistics and security services. It is owned by the Popal brothers who are believed to be cousins of former Afghan President, Hamid Karzai. They are from the Popalzai sub-tribe, to which Ahmad Shah Durrani, often regarded as the founder of modern Afghanistan, and several of Afghanistan's former leaders belong.

The New York Times reported that according to Western officials, the largest shareholder in the company is Qayum Karzai, the brother of Afghan President, but he stated after the report was published, that he has no financial interest in the company. Watan Group is a partner of China National Petroleum Corporation (CNPC), which in December 2011 received Afghanistan's first big contract for oil field exploration and development. The three oil fields estimated to contain 87 million barrels of oil.

Their website states that they have seven subsidiaries: AMP Trading, Ehsaan Construction, Navia Design, Sino-Afghan Steel, Watan Telecom, Watan Risk Management and Watan Oil & Gas. Watan Risk Management's clientele includes: USAID-funded Delouite, Checchi, Jhpiego, State University of New York (SUNY), American University of Afghanistan (AUAF) and other projects under the British and American militaries.

== Watan Risk Management ==
Watan Risk Management (WRM) was established in 2005 by the Popal brothers and a former member of the Special Boat Service and is described as a "private military arm". In 2007, their armoury of Kalashnikovs was seized by the police despite their documentation being in order, the company believed that the raid was orchestrated by competitors in the Ministry of Interior to seize parts of their business. A major part of their business is protecting convoys of trucks carrying supplies for the American Army between Kabul and Kandahar. An article in 2009, published in The Nation accused the company of paying the Taliban so that their convoys are not attacked. An Afghan official commented that around 10% of the $360 million contract may be paid to the Taliban to protect the convoys. They control the highway between Kabul and Kandahar which all trucking companies must use to transport goods away from Kabul. They control the road because they have a pact with a local militia leader, Commander Ruhullah, who is thought to charge $1,500 for one truck to travel to Kandahar, a distance of 300 kilometers.

In response to the article published in The Nation and that was also published in other publications, including The Guardian, the chairman of the group Ahmad Rateb Popal wrote a letter disputing the accuracy of the report. He stated that they have not received any business as a result of being related to Hamid Karzai and that they do not pay anybody to prevent convoys being attacked (in fact 50 guards die each month on average). He also suggested that the success of the companies meant that competitors where jealous and therefore told The Nation's reporter facts that were untrue. A Former Afghan Communist General and Member of Parliament Nur-ul-haq ulumi told CBC News that it was unlikely that a security company could function without bribing insurgents saying that if companies did not pay "the convoys were burned and that's it." Michael Semple, an expert on the Taliban, also said that it was likely WRM pay to travel safely along stretches of highway.

WRM had been hired to protect the Canadians involved in building the Dahla Dam near Kandahar. According to The Toronto Star in February 2010, a standoff occurred between employees of WRM and Canadian security officials which led to the Canadians who were providing oversight over the Afghan security forces to flee the country.

In May 2010, WRM were banned from operating on one of the highway between Kabul and Kandahar after a guard working for the company shot and killed a civilian. The company was ordered to pay compensation to the family of the civilian by the Afghan interior ministry. The ban came into effect on May 14 but was overturned within two weeks after 1000 trucks were backlogged on the highway.

In December 2010, US Army officials proposed banning Watan Risk Management from all US government work. Popals and Ruhullah separately challenged the actions. The Army decided not to debar Watan, opting instead for an administrative agreement that says the company may not bid on any convoy security contracts paid for with U.S. tax dollars for the next three years. However, the ban does not affect the other companies owned by the Popals, which include oil, gas, steel, construction and telecom businesses, according to the terms of the agreement signed in early August. Furthermore, in the summer of 2011, in a stunning reversal of course, Army officials inexplicably stopped the debarment proceedings and settled with Watan Risk Management and Commander Ruhullah.

== Watan Telecom ==
Watan Telecom is a consortium of Al Houbi Telecom of Saudi Arabia and two North American companies, Cellular One and GlobeCom. In 2005 it acquired a licence for $30 million to become a mobile telecoms service provider in Afghanistan, the licence will last until 2020, when it can be renewed for another ten years.
