= Pader Watan =

Military unit in the Soviet-backed Afghanistan

Pader-Watan
- پدر وطن
- Leader: Ismatullah Muslim
- Dates active: 1983–1992 (Approximately)
- Active regions: All of Afghanistan (Especially Balkh, Kandahar and Baghlan Provinces)
- Ideology: Islamism (Some factions); Communism; Sovietism
- Size: 100,000+

The Pader Watan were local counter-guerrilla organizations employed by the Soviet Union and their ally the Democratic Republic of Afghanistan (DRA). The first Pader Watan unit appeared in 1983, it is unclear if they were active before this.

== Organization ==
The Pader Watan consisted of former mujahideen who defected to the DRA to form paramilitary units. The Pader Watan units assisted the Soviets by guarding key points along highways, and also providing protection to Soviet-DRA convoys, and watching out for night attacks, and infiltration by Mujahideen. They were referred to derisively as "Traitors in Turbans".

== See also ==
- Abdul Jabar Qahraman
- Ismatullah Muslim
