= Otan =

Otan or OTAN may refer to:

- OTAN, abbreviation for the NATO intergovernmental military alliance in French, Portuguese and Spanish
- Otan, political party of Kazakhstan, formed into Nur Otan in 2006 and into Amanat in 2022
- Otan Ayegbaju, or Otan, a town in Nigeria
- Autan, or Otan, a village in Syria
