= Watan (newspaper) =

Arab-American newspaper

Watan News
- Type: Weekly newspaper
- Owner: Watan News LLC
- Founder: Nezam Mahdawi
- Founded: March 1991; 35 years ago
- Headquarters: Washington
- Country: United states
- Website: watanserb.com

Watan (Arabic: وطن يغرد خارج السرب, lit. 'A homeland that sings outside the flock') is a weekly Arab-American newspaper published by Watan News LLC. It was founded in Washington, D.C., in 1990 by journalist Nezam Mahdawi. In 1993, the newspaper moved its headquarters to Los Angeles, California.

Watan News started as a monthly newspaper, then became a weekly printed newspaper. It launched its news website in 1996.

== History ==
Watan was originally launched as a monthly print publication in Washington in 1991 by Nazem Mahdawi. It shifted its headquarter to California in 1996.

Watan newspaper was started as a monthly, then every two weeks, and then weekly.
