= List of engagements during the Sudanese civil war (2023–present) =

This is a list of engagements during the Sudanese civil war (2023–present).

Military situation

== Battles ==
Name	Location	Start date	End date	Result of the battle
Siege of El Fasher	El Fasher, North Darfur, Sudan	13 April 2023	26 October 2025	RSF victory: El Fasher is captured by the Rapid Support Forces; El Fasher massacre; SAF's 6th Infantry Division retreat westward; El Fasher and surrounding villages fall under total RSF control
Battle of Khartoum	Khartoum and proximity, Khartoum State, Sudan	15 April 2023	20 May 2025	SAF victory
Darfur campaign	Darfur (with spillovers into Chad and South Sudan)	15 April 2023	26 October 2025	Ongoing: Rapid Support Forces control all of South Darfur, Central Darfur, East Darfur, and West Darfur; RSF forces capture strategic cities such as Geneina, Kabkabiya, Um Dafuq, Ed Daein, Kutum, Nyala, and El Fasher; The Sudan Liberation Movement controls parts of Darfur including the town of Tawila
Kordofan Campaign	Kordofan states (North, South, and West)	15 April 2023		Ongoing: Rapid Support Forces control most of West and the southwestern portion of North Kordofan; SPLM-N (al-Hilu) controls parts of South Kordofan
Battle of Geneina	Geneina	15 April 2023	22 June 2023	RSF victory
Rapid Support Forces occupation of the Khartoum International Airport	Khartoum International Airport, Khartoum, Sudan	15 April 2023	25 March 2025	SAF victory: RSF retreated from airport on 25 March 2025
Battle of Merowe Airport	Merowe Airport, Merowe, Sudan	15 April 2023	21 April 2023	SAF victory: RSF captures Merowe airport on April 15; SAF captures the airport on April 19, and RSF retreats from Merowe on April 21
Battle of Nyala	Nyala, South Darfur, Sudan	15 April 2023	26 October 2023	RSF victory: Fighting breaks out between April 15 and April 20; Ceasefires occur between April 20 and May 5, with sporadic clashes until August 8; RSF launches an offensive on August 11, later besieging the city; RSF capture the infantry base of the 16th Infantry Division, effectively capturing Nyala
Siege of El Obeid	El Obeid, North Kordofan, Sudan	15 April 2023		SAF Victory: SAF repels several RSF attacks on the city between April 15 and May 23, 2023; RSF besieges El Obeid from June 2023; By September, SAF retains positions in the city, while RSF forces continue to besiege it from outside; On February 23, 2025, the Sudanese army fully lifts the siege of El Obeid.
Battle of Kutum	Kutum and Kassab refugee camp, North Darfur, Sudan	30 May 2023	4 June 2023	RSF victory
Battle of Kadugli	Kaduqli, South Kordofan State, Sudan	8 June 2023		Ongoing
Battle of Dilling	Dalang, South Kordofan	21 June 2023	24 February 2025	SAF victory: SAF remains in control of Dilling; Siege lifted on 24 February 2025, connecting with forces in Kadugli.; SPLM-N and RSF remained next to the city until 26 January 2026, then SAF captured Habila and Al-Takmah.
Battle of Wad Madani	Wad Madani, Gezira State	15 December 2023	11 January 2025	SAF victory: First Battle: RSF victory; First Battle: RSF seizes control of Wad Madani between December 2023 and January 2025; Second Battle: SAF victory; Second Battle: SAF regained control of Wad Madani; SAF continues moving north towards Khartoum
Siege of Babanusa	Babanusa, West Kordofan, Sudan	22 January 2024	1 December 2025	RSF victory: SAF repels initial assault, controlling the city still; Artillery clashes on 6 May 2024 kills commanders from both sides; RSF still lays siege to the city, but major attacks have ceased.; On 11 November 2025, RSF started new attacks on the city, and on the 1 December, RSF took full control over the city.
Capture of Al-Fulah	Al-Fulah and West Kordofan, Sudan	19 June 2024	20 June 2024	RSF victory: RSF captures Al Fulah on June 20.; RSF later takes control over several more villages and areas in West Kordofan.; Sudanese army withdraws to Babanusa.
Battle of Jebel Moya	Jebel Moya, Sennar State, Sudan	25 June 2024	5 October 2024	SAF victory: RSF captures Jebel Moya on 25 June.; SAF recaptures the area by 5 October.
Sennar offensive	Sennar State	25 June 2024	5 March 2025	SAF victory: Sudanese army recaptured most of Sennar state except small villages under RSF control, including Mazmoum.; RSF launched incursion into Blue Nile State on 4 August 2024.; SAF launched a counteroffensive on the rest of RSF controlled territory on 5 March 2025, and on the same day recaptured remaining RSF controlled areas located in the state, including Mazmoum and Al-Dali, leading to RSF withdrawal across the South Sudan border.
Bahri offensive	Bahri, Sudan	26 September 2024	17 February 2025	SAF victory: Sudanese army and allied forces take fully control of the city of Bahri on February 17, 2025
Battle of Al Maliha	Al Maliha, North Darfur	28 December 2024	20 December 2025	RSF victory: Fighting largely ceases by June 2025; RSF in control of the city and most of the Meidob Volcanic Field while the SAF is in control of Al Atrun
Battle of Gabal El Uweinat	Gabal El Uweinat, Libya–Sudan border	6 June 2025	16 June 2025	RSF victory: RSF and LNA take full control of the Libyan Border.
Blue Nile Campaign	Blue Nile State	25 January 2026		Ongoing: Rapid Support Forces and SPLM-N (al-Hilu) face heavy setbacks since summer 2026.
Battle of Bara	Bara, Sudan	5 March 2026	27 July 2026	SAF victory: First Battle: RSF victory; SAF recapture the town on 5 march.; RSF reoccupies the town after 10 days on March 16; Start of the Bara massacre; Second Battle: SAF Victory; SAF recapture the town on 27 July; End of the Bara massacre; Many pro-RSF tribes and soldiers fighting in the city of Bara defected or surrendered.
Second Battle of Dilling	South Kordofan	26 April 2026	19 May 2026	SAF victory
Battle of Kurmuk	Kurmuk, Blue Nile State	24 March 2026	22 August 2026	RSF Victory
2026 Kauda clashes	Kauda, Southern Kordofan	8 May 2026		Ongoing
El Nahud Offensive	West Kordofan	5 November 2026		Ongoing

== Massacres ==
Name	Location	Start date	Perpetrator	Deaths
Darfur genocide (2023–present)	Darfur, Sudan	15 April 2023	Government of Peace and Unity; Rapid Support Forces (denied by RSF); Janjaweed	At least 17,000–145,000
Masalit genocide	West Darfur, Sudan	24 April 2023	Rapid Support Forces (denied by RSF)	At least 17,000–145,000
Misterei massacre	Misterei, West Darfur, Sudan	27 May 2023	Janjaweed and Rapid Support Forces	97 killed
Taiba bridge massacre	Taiba bridge, Nyala, South Darfur, Sudan	23 August 2023	Unknown	42 killed
Ardamata massacre	Ardamata, West Darfur	8 November 2023	Janjaweed and Rapid Support Forces	Between 800 and 2,000
Wad An Nora massacre	Wad Al-Noora, Gezira State, Sudan	5 June 2024	Rapid Support Forces	150-200+
Galgani massacre	Galgani, Sennar State, Sudan	15 August 2024	Rapid Support Forces	108+, 24+ women and minors
2024 eastern Gezira State massacres	Eastern Gezira State, Sudan	20 October 2024	Rapid Support Forces	8,000+
El Fasher massacre	El Fasher, North Darfur, Sudan	26 October 2025	Government of Peace and Unity; Rapid Support Forces; Janjaweed	60,000–68,000: 460+ in Saudi maternity hospital

== See also ==
- Timeline of the Sudanese civil war (2023)
- Timeline of the Sudanese civil war (2024)
- Timeline of the Sudanese civil war (2025)
- Timeline of the Sudanese civil war (2026)
