= Battle of Gabal El Uweinat =

Battle in Sudan

- Part of the Sudanese civil war
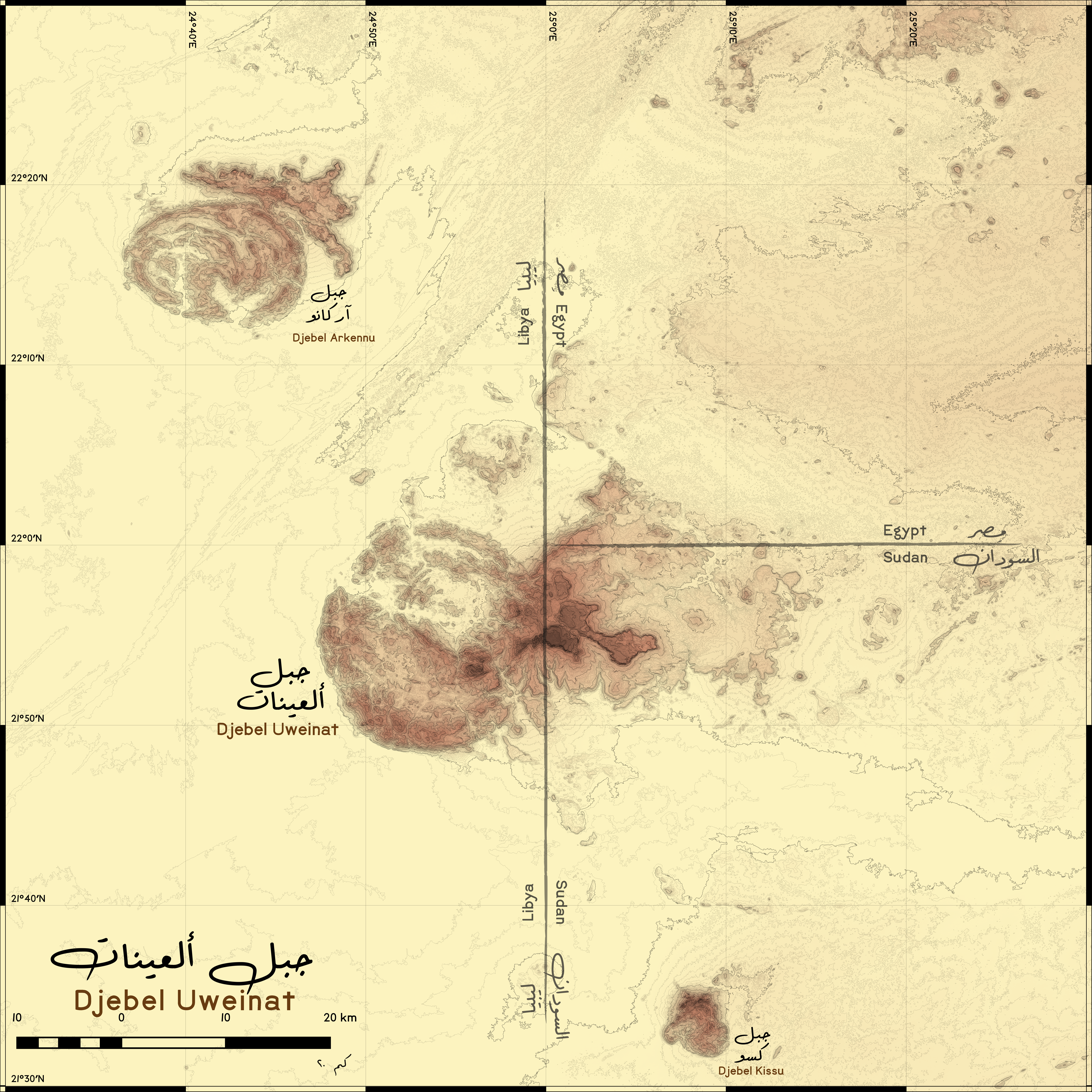
- Topographic view of Jebel Uweinat and surrounding regions at the Libya–Egypt–Sudan border
| Date | 6–16 June 2025 (1 week and 3 days) |
| Location | Gabal El Uweinat, Libya–Sudan border |
| Result | RSF victory: RSF and LNA take full control of the Libyan Border. |

Belligerents
| Republic of Sudan; Government of Sudan; Transitional Sovereignty Council; Sudanese Armed Forces; Darfur Joint Protection Force | (Sudan) Government of Peace and Unity; Rapid Support Forces; (Libya) Government of National Stability; Libyan National Army; Subul al-Salam Battalion; Tariq Ben Zeyad Brigade |

Commanders and leaders
| Minni Minnawi | Abdelrahim Dagalo; Abdelrahman Hashim; Saddam Haftar |

Casualties and losses
| 2 killed +1 captured | 2 killed 5 captured |
- 4,000 people displaced

The Battle of Gabal El Uweinat was the battle for the strategic Gabal El Uweinat mountains and surrounding area along the Libya–Sudan border. The battle ended with the RSF and allied forces taking full control of the "Triangle" border region.

== Background ==
The Libyan Border is a crucial area in the Sudanese Civil War, as it is a major supply line for the RSF, and the battle came after SAF airstrikes on the Nyala Airport destroyed a UAE cargo plane and killed several RSF and UAE officers. The region also contains the second largest gold reserve in Africa. It is known as a corridor for extremists, as well as arms and human traffickers.

The area was the site of clashes between the Egyptian Army and artisanal miner that left 3 miners injured, though it is unclear if they were mining within the Sudanese or Egyptian side of the area.

== Battle ==
Fighting began on June 6 when the JDF clashed with the Subul al-Salam Battalion around Mount Arkenu after they advanced 3 kilometers into the Sudanese side. A pro-army source reported that 2 Libyan fighters were killed and 2 more were captured. Another wave of clashes occurred by "a group from Kufra", inflicting casualties on the JDF. According to the Battalion's commander, 3 of their fighters were captured while 2 SAF soldiers were killed and at least 1 was captured.

The SAF then retreated their forces from the area on June 11 in a move they called a defensive arrangement for more potential clashes. The RSF claimed to have taken control of the mountains, while Haftar's government claimed that the clashes were caused by SAF aligned forces attacking a Libyan patrol. The government of the Northern State said that they would confront Libyan forces in response.

On June 16, RSF forces captured the Chevrelet military base and Karab el Tum oasis, seizing SAF equipment, ammunition, and vehicles, and taking full control of the border region. This resulted in the JDF's supply lines with the SAF being cut and their forces being surround by the RSF while the SAF retreated to their base in Al Atrun. Reports from locals indicated that the Subul al-Salam and Tariq Ben Zeyad brigades had helped the RSF reach the al-Katma market, committing ethnic killings and looting it. Airstrikes on RSF fighters in Chevrelet were reported later that day and on June 17.

== Aftermath ==
About 4,000 people were displaced by the fighting, with some refugees fleeing into Egypt for shelter and later being forced to move to Libya. There was also widespread panic among civilians in the Northern State as they feared an RSF offensive would be soon.

Several analysts noted that the LNA's involvement could risk other foreign powers being directly involved in the conflict. The battle also allowed for the RSF to reopen supply lines between Libya for supplies like weapons, as well as reinforcements.

The SAF and the Sudanese Foreign Ministry condemned the attacks, claiming that the RSF was being sponsored by the UAE and helped by Haftar's forces. Khalifa Haftar denied that Libyan forces were involved in the battle, while the Government of National Unity claimed that the battalion was not under their control and condemned Libyan involvement in the conflict.
