= Battle of Al Maliha =

Battle in Sudan

Battle of Al-Maliha
- Part of the Sudanese civil war
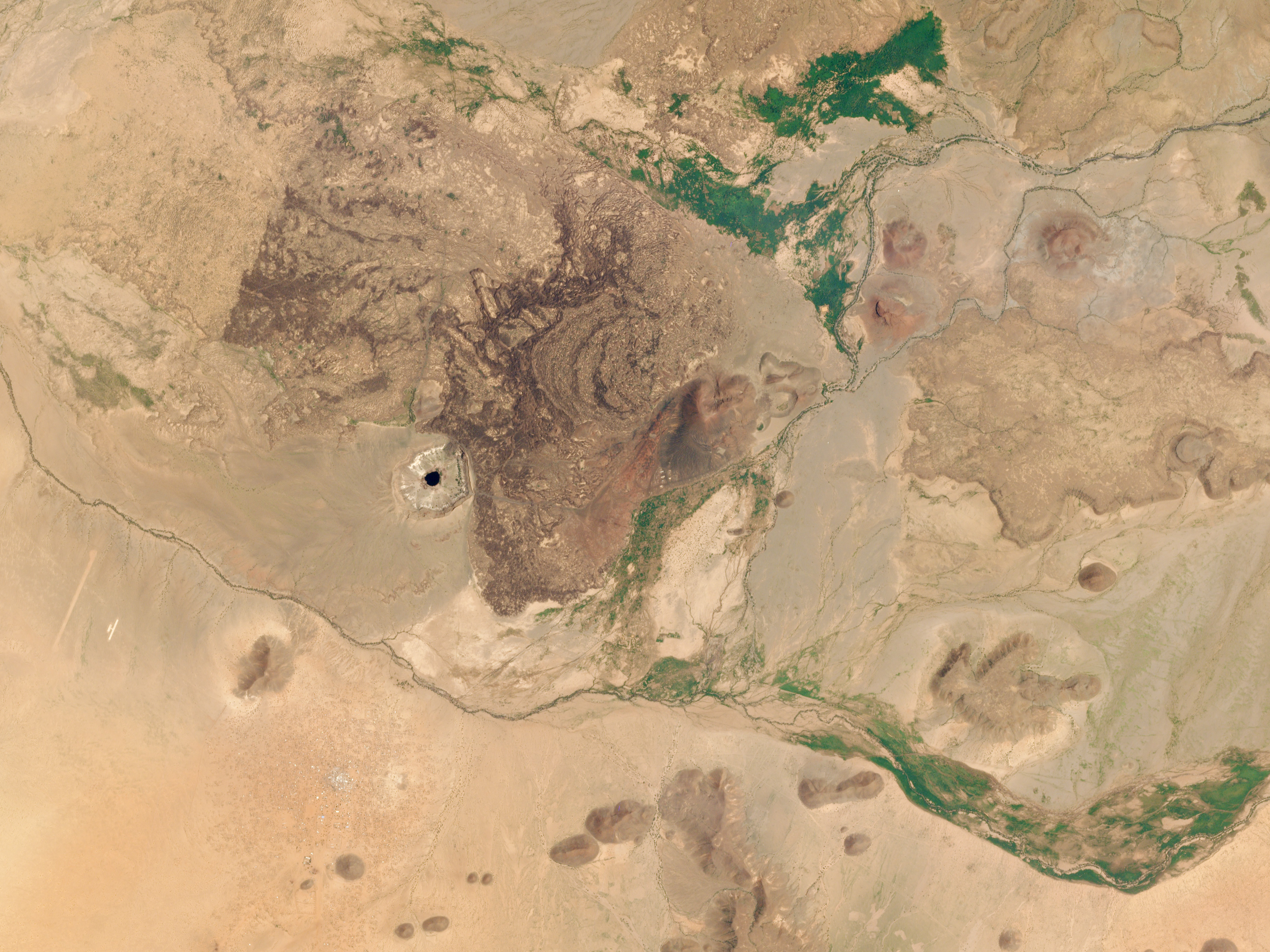
- Satellite image of the Malha Wells (or Al Maliha) in the bottom left near a crater lake.
Date	28 December 2024 – 20 December 2025 (11 months 3 weeks and 1 day)
Location	Al Maliha, North Darfur
Result	RSF Victory: Fighting largely ceases by June 2025; RSF in control of the city and most of the Meidob Volcanic Field while the SAF is in control of Al Atrun; The SAF withdraws from Al Maliha

Belligerents
Sudanese Government; Sudanese Armed Forces; Central Reserve Forces; SLM (Minnawi); Darfur Joint Protection Force; Desert Axis Command	(Sudan) Government of Peace and Unity (from April 2025); Rapid Support Forces

Commanders and leaders
Minni Minnawi; Abdullah Banda (WIA)	Ali Rizqallah; Ayoub Ahimer †

Strength
Unknown	700 combat vehicles

Casualties and losses
RSF Claim; 380 killed	SAF Claim +470 killed 21 captured 6 vehicles destroyed 67 vehicles captured
- +175 killed 15,000 displaced

Since January 2025, the Battle of Al-Maliha has been fought between the Sudanese Armed Forces and its allies against the Rapid Support Forces within the strategic city of Al Maliha and the surrounding areas, including the Meidob Volcanic Field and Al Atrun oasis in North Darfur.

== Background ==
The town is strategic as it is a major trade hub and supply line due to its proximity to Libya and the RSF's units that are stationed in El Fasher, a city which is located 200 kilometers south. The area is also near the military base of Al Zorg, which was the site of battles between the Joint Darfur Force and the RSF between December 21 and 22, 2024.

On October 21, 2024, an Ilyushin Il-76 was shot down by the RSF around the area, killing all 5 on board including 2 Russian nationals.

== Battle ==
Fighting between the JDF and the RSF in the city began on December 28, 2024. The JDF claimed to have destroyed 3 RSF vehicles in attacks in Drei Shaqi and Jabal Issa, as the RSF was attempting to launch attacks on Al Maliha from there.

By January 1, the Joint Darfur Force said it had killed 462 Rapid Support Forces fighters including 6 commanders in the failed attack on Al-Maliha. In addition, 3 vehicles were destroyed. The remaining unit under Ali Rizqallah Al-Safana retreated. The JDF also called on the RSF to surrender to the JDF or the Sudanese Armed Forces. It was also reported that the SAF had provided aerial support and helped the Midob people who live there. On January 14, The JDF claimed to have killed hundreds of RSF militants, destroyed 262 vehicles, and captured 21 militants and 67 vehicles during clashes in Al-Maliha and Halaf in North Darfur.

On March 9, 2 people were killed and 4 injured in RSF drone strikes in Al-Maliha.

The RSF seized control over Al-Maliha on March 20, claiming to have encircled the town and killing 380. The JDF denied this, claiming to have repelled the attacks and lured the RSF into a trap. They added that eight senior RSF officers, including field commander Colonel Ayoub Ahimer, had been killed. about 15,000 households were also displaced in fighting between the 20 and 21. A source from the JDF claimed that the failure was the result of poor defensive planning, forcing the units to retreat west towards their forces stationed near the Chadian Border. This victory coincided with major SAF gains within Khartoum, namely the Republican Palace among other areas in Central Khartoum.

RSF proceeded to set up checkpoints within the city while clashes continued into March 22. The JDF claimed that their forces, along with the SAF's Central Reserve Forces, had been attacked and the town had been invaded on 3 Axis with about 700 combat vehicles. Clashes the previous day left JDF commander Abdullah Banda wounded. Reinforcements for the JDF also arrived from Al-Dabbah.

On May 19, The SAF retook Wadi al-Atrun in Al-Maliha, located on a strategic road linking Northern State and North Darfur. On August 16, a UN aid convoy of 18 trucks successfully arrived in the town through the Tiné crossing on the border with Chad, an area controlled by the SAF and JDF.

On October 2, The Army carried out an aerial raid bombing 3 sites and claiming to have targeted an RSF convoy. An army source claimed to have destroyed an ammunition truck and combat vehicles, however local sources reported that drone strikes had caused civilian casualties. On November 16, 10 people were killed and 42 others were injured in an SAF drone strike on the Taqru Mine, a gold mine located North of Al Maliha.

== Massacres ==
On January 25, a health facility in the town was attacked by the RSF, cutting off health services for local residents and refugees.

The Sudan Doctors Union reported that 48 people were killed and 63 more were injured in ethnically motivated attacks by the RSF in Al-Maliha on March 22. The Sudanese resistance committees also reported 15 more unidentified victims of the attack. On April 4, the same day that the city fell, more than 100 civilians were killed in clashes in Al Maliha. The RSF was also accused of human rights violations after its capture, including looting, killings, and torture. Homes were also destroyed and the market was looted and burned down.
