= Darfur campaign (2023–present) =

Military offensive in Sudan

- Part of Sudanese civil war (2023–present)
- Map of the East Sudan campaign from 2023
Date	15 April 2023 – present (3 years, 7 months and 1 day)
Location	Darfur (with spillovers into Northern State, Chad and South Sudan)
Status	Ongoing; RSF forces capture strategic cities such as Geneina, Kabkabiya, Um Dafuq, Ed Daein, Kutum, Nyala, and El Fasher
Territorial changes	Rapid Support Forces control all of South Darfur, Central Darfur, East Darfur, and most of West Darfur; The Sudan Liberation Movement controls parts of Darfur including the town of Tawila

Belligerents
(Sudan) Government of Peace and Unity (since Apr. 2025); Rapid Support Forces; Various Arab tribes; (Central African Republic) Coalition of Patriots for Change (since Aug. 2023); Desert Wolves	Sudanese government; Sudanese Armed Forces (SAF); JEM; SLM (Minnawi); Darfur Joint Protection Force (since Nov. 2023); Sudanese National Alliance; Gathering of Sudan Liberation Forces; Chadian rebels (alleged); Liberated Areas; SLM (al-Nur)

Commanders and leaders
Abdelrahim Dagalo; Abdul Rahman Jumma; Ali Yaqoub Gibril †; Salih Al-Foti; Hassan Saleh Nahar; Abu Lulu; Al-Nour al-Qubba (until April 2026); Abdel Rahim Bahr Jali †; Hamid Ali Abubakar †; Shartay Mohamed Jafar †; Ahmed Abdallah Bishr † (Central African Republic) Noureddine Adam (WIA)	Gibril Ibrahim (JEM); Minni Minnawi (SLA-MM); Al-Nour al-Qubba (from April 2026); Ahmed Abdallah Bishr X; Abdul Wahid al-Nur

Units involved
20th Infantry Division	91st Infantry Brigade

Casualties and losses
- 10,000+ killed Thousands of civilians killed and injured 60% of the population flees.

The Darfur campaign, also known as the Darfur offensive, is a theatre of operation in the war in Sudan that affects five states in Darfur: South Darfur, East Darfur, North Darfur, Central Darfur and West Darfur. The offensive mainly started on 15 April 2023 in West Darfur where the Rapid Support Forces (RSF) forces captured Geneina, the conflict came after several days of high tensions between the forces and the government.

The Battle of Geneina and the Battle of Nyala were the largest battles of the campaign, which all in total killed hundreds of civilians and both ended up with a RSF victory between 20 April to 2 May 2023.

== Overview of war ==
In the early hours of the morning of 15 April 2023, soldiers loyal to the Rapid Support Forces started a series of assaults on key buildings in Khartoum, primarily the Khartoum International Airport. While the international airport was captured by the RSF, street battles continued throughout Khartoum and the neighboring cities of Omdurman and Bahri. The RSF also captured the presidential palace, the residence of the former Sudanese president Omar al-Bashir, and attacked a military base. Users on Facebook Live and Twitter documented the Sudanese Air Force flying above the city, and striking the RSF targets.

== Origin in Darfur ==
The history of conflicts in Sudan has consisted of foreign invasions and resistance, ethnic tensions, religious disputes, and competition over resources. In its modern history, two civil wars between the central government and the southern regions killed 1.5 million people, and a continuing conflict in the western region of Darfur has displaced two million people and killed more than 200,000 people. Since independence in 1956, Sudan has had more than fifteen military coups and it has also been ruled by the military for the majority of the republic's existence, with only brief periods of democratic civilian parliamentary rule.

Former president and military strongman Omar al-Bashir presided over the War in Darfur, a region in the west of the country, and oversaw state-sponsored violence in the region of Darfur, leading to charges of war crimes and genocide. Approximately 300,000 people were killed and 2.7 million forcibly displaced in the early part of the Darfur conflict; the intensity of the violence later declined. Key figures in the Darfur conflict included Mohamed Hamdan "Hemedti" Dagalo, a warlord who commanded the Rapid Support Forces (RSF) which evolved from the Janjaweed, a collection of Arab militias drawn from camel-trading tribes active in Darfur and portions of Chad.

== Campaign ==
On 15 April 2023, Geneina, the capital of West Darfur, was largely captured and occupied by RSF forces, with little resistance, except at Geneina Airport. The occupation of the city lasted until 25 April 2023, when a battle for the city resumed and was reportedly 'deadly'. By the end of the battle, over 200 people had been confirmed to be killed, with the number estimated to be much higher between soldiers and civilians. On 2 May, Geneina was mostly captured by RSF, while the group also kept advancing in several other areas of the province.

By 23 April 2023, the Kabkabiya fell under the control of the RSF. Three employees of the World Food Programme (WFP) were killed after being caught in the crossfire at a military base. Two other staff members were injured.

The RSF quickly began to enlist Darfur's Arab tribes to expand its ranks and gain the upper hand in the area. Together, the RSF and its allies quickly overran large parts and Darfur, and began to expel or outright massacre non-Arabs. According to security analyst Andrew McGregor, the RSF operations in Darfur appeared to aim at "ethnically cleans[ing] the region of its indigenous Black population". In response, several non-Arab militias and ex-rebel groups in Darfur allied with the SAF to defend their holdings. Five major armed groups formed the Darfur Joint Protection Force; the alliance included the Justice and Equality Movement (JEM) under Gibril Ibrahim, the Sudan Liberation Army faction (SLA-MM) of Darfur Governor Minni Minawi, and the Gathering of Sudan Liberation Forces under al-Tahir Hajar. However, the cooperation between the Sudan Armed Forces and the Joint Protection Force remained difficult, as both sides distrusted each other. Several member groups of the Joint Protection Force experienced internal divisions over the alliance with the SAF, with some factions leaving their respective groups to stay neutral or even side with the RSF.

=== Siege of Zalingei ===
Between 17 and 23 May 2023, the Zalingei Teaching Hospital was looted as was the Médecins Sans Frontières warehouse. Telecommunications were also cut off. By 29 May, Zalingei became a new epicenter of the fighting under siege by armed militias. Housing and infrastructure were destroyed. The town reportedly faced medical shortages after looting and attacks by the Rapid Support Forces. In June 2023, the United Nations reported of clashes inside the city.

On 6 August 2023, the RSF claimed they had taken full control of the city and the wider Central Darfur region. The SAF subsequently claimed that it had raised the siege of Zalingei and had retaken the western part of the city from the RSF. On 31 August, Zalingei's SAF garrison, consisting of the 21st Infantry Division, fled the settlement. This allowed the RSF to fully secure the entire city without further opposition.

=== Capture of Ed Daein ===
Tension between the army and the RSF escalated near Ed Daein after the RSF threatened on 16 November to attack the city, send an ultimatum to the army until Sunday to withdraw. This led to many citizens leaving in case of future battles. The RSF also seized the nearby Adila oilfield in East Darfur two months earlier on 11 August 2023.

On 20 November, the battles in the city began to start as the RSF launched an offensive on the city. By the 21st, the RSF was able to capture the oilfield of Shag Omar, also known as Sufyan, the RSF also published videos of their seizure of the international airport in Ed Daein. This led the army to retreat eastward.

Later on the 21st, the latter captured the 20th Infantry Division base at around 4:00am, according to RSF commander in East Darfur, Hassan Saleh Nahar, which makes the 4th army base in Darfur to fall to the RSF. All supplies and weaponry were also captured according to the statement. The RSF managed to took over the city by 22 November 2023.

=== Battle of Nyala and al-Fashir ===
On 26 October, the RSF captured Nyala, Sudan's second-largest city and South Darfur's capital, after a long siege. As the city had served as a major military center, this was a major victory for the RSF. The center of West Darfur, Geneina, was fully conquered by the RSF on 4 November. In course of and after the battle for Geneina, the RSF and its allies subsequently massacred many civilians. The fall of Geneina caused many SAF garrisons in Darfur to also abandon their posts and desert or flee to Chad. Meanwhile, the RSF and its allies laid siege to al-Fashir, the capital of the entire Darfur region. At al-Fashir, the SAF-Joint Protection Force garrison received support by another rebel group, the Sudan Liberation Army's al-Nur faction (SLA-AW).

By mid-December 2023, McGregor assessed that the RSF was nearing victory in the conflict over Darfur, controlling four of the region's five states. Al-Fashir still remained under control of the Joint Protection Force, but it was no longer receiving supplies from the SAF-held areas in central Sudan, causing food, fuel, and medicines shortages. Meanwhile, SAF control was also collapsing in other parts of Sudan, making any additional support for the Darfuri holdouts more unlikely.

By May 2024, al-Fashir had become the last stronghold of the Sudanese government in Darfur. The city remained besieged by the RSF which had begun to launch raids into the settlement.

On 26 October 2025, El Fasher fell to the RSF after numerous assaults in previous months, resulting in widespread massacres and an ongoing refugee crisis.

=== Timeline of conflict after 2025 ===
On 13 March 2026, the SAF operated a drone strike in Foro Baranga, West Darfur, killing RSF commander Abdel Rahim Bahr Jali, who was a major figure in recruiting and mobilization efforts in the region. The operation also targeted a convoy killing 13 personnel, including an unnamed RSF major general, and several other officers, wounding 23 others. The convoy was claimed to have been moving towards Jebel Moon and Kulbus which were preparing for an assault on the town Tina. Foro Baranga has been controlled by the RSF since the start of the war.

In April 2026, an RSF commander and one of the founders of the militia, known as Al-Nour al-Qubba, who served in the seizure of El Fasher, had defected to the Sudanese army. The defection was due to disagreements with the RSF on not giving Al-Qubba the lead of the RSF command in North darfur. His defection has been welcomed by the Sudanese president Abdel Fattah al-Burhan himself in Northern Sate. RSF has sentenced him to death in absentia. By the end of May, clashes erupt in Kabum, South Darfur, between the tribes Beni Halba and Salamat. Both tribes were seen deploying RSF vehicles during the clashes according to eyewitnesses. The clash left an unknown amount of tribal fighters dead, with villages burnt and thousands of civilians displaced. The fighting spread to other villages in the state including, Wastani, Mirkindi, Damba, and parts of Central Darfur State where both tribes live. By 3 June, tribal clashes continued as 50 more fatalities were reported through the clash.

On 27 June, the Sudanese Joint forces recaptured Abu Qamra, North Darfur. This marks one of RSF's first defeats in Darfur since the start of the war. The RSF has also reportedly burned eight villages in Um Baru. Thousands of residents had to flee towards Chad.

On 4 August, RSF commander Mahdi Jebel Moon was killed following clashes with the JDF, with the RSF claiming to have captured Bir Saliba. On 5 August, Darfur's governor and SLM leader Minni Minnawi announced the allied forces have pushed RSF back recapturing Bir Saliba a day after and the Hajar al-Marfein area.

== Foreign role in the campaign ==
=== Support of the RSF ===
It has been alleged that the RSF has received foreign support in Darfur, most notably at the hands of the United Arab Emirates and the Wagner Group. The Wagner Group, though self-described as a private military company, is widely considered to be a de facto private army of the Russian government. United Arab Emirates-linked Colombian mercenaries have also fought for the RSF in Darfur.

Darfur Governor Minni Minawi also accused the Chadian government of allowing the passage of arms and mercenaries to the RSF. The Libyan National Army (LNA) reportedly provided the RSF with supplies in Darfur, though the LNA denied any involvement.

=== Support of anti-RSF forces ===
Chadian officers of Zaghawa ethnicity allegedly aid the Darfur Joint Protection Force, as several of its member groups are recruited from Sudanese Zaghawa. Furthermore, the Chadian government claimed in 2024 that Chadian rebels under Osman Dillo were fighting alongside the Sudanese Army in Darfur.

== Casualties ==
On July 22, the American television channel CNN, citing local tribal leaders, stated that 10,000 people had been killed in West Darfur alone since the beginning of the conflict.

The fighting has caused a humanitarian crisis in the region. Large numbers of Darfurians have fled to neighbouring Chad. Darfurians, along Khartoum residents, have made up the majority of Sudanese refugees abroad.

Against the backdrop of the civil war, regional interethnic conflicts have resumed. For example, on 28 April 2023, clashes took place here between Arabs and Masalites. On 3 May, 200 people died in interethnic confrontation in El Geneina. At the end of May, 97 Masalites were killed by Arab militias in the town of Mysteries.

On 17 April, three World Food Programme staff were reported to have been killed in a shootout at a military base in Kabkabiya. Two other staff were seriously injured, and several of the organisation's vehicles were looted by SAP fighters. The organisation Save the Children was also affected by the clashes, with its Darfur office looted. The same happened to the UN relief office in the same area, and to Islamic Relief. On 20 April, a car carrying staff from the Norwegian Refugee Council was attacked in El Fashir, but no injuries were reported. On 3 May, six World Food Programme trucks were looted.

On 2 May 2024, two Red Cross drivers were killed in South Darfur. On 11 June, eight volunteers were killed in an RSF shelling of a soup kitchen in the Tambosi area of El Fasher. On 26 November, the SAF accused the RSF of looting humanitarian aid from an World Food Programme convoy travelling from Port Sudan to Zamzam IDP camp as it passed through Armel on the border between West and North Kardaan, adding that the loot was smuggled to Nyala.

Following the capture of El Fasher by the RSF, numerous mass killings and abuses amounting to a genocide that resulted in at least 6,000 civilians being killed within the span of 3 days. The estimated death toll is believed to be much larger at over 60,000 killed.
