= Nimir Mohammed Abdelrahman =

Sudanese politician and former Governor of North Darfur

Governor of North Darfur
- In office June 14, 2021 – January 1, 2024
- Preceded by: Mohamed Hassan Arabi
- Succeeded by: Al-Hafiz Bakhit Mohammed

President of the Sudan Liberation Movement - Transitional Council
- Incumbent
- Assumed office 2025
- Preceded by: El Hadi Idris

Personal details
- Born: 1976 (age 49–50) Daba Nayra, Tawila, North Darfur, Sudan
- Education: Omdurman Islamic University

Military service
- Allegiance: SLM (2003-2004); SLM-AW (2006-2011); SLM]-TC (2012-present); Transitional Sovereignty Council (2019-2023); Rapid Support Forces (2023-present)

Nimir Mohammed Abdelrahman (Arabic: نمر محمد عبد الرحمن) is a Sudanese politician who served as the governor of North Darfur from June 10, 2021, to January 1, 2024. He was appointed by the Transitional Sovereignty Council under Abdalla Hamdok and initially supported the Sudanese government at the outbreak of the Sudanese civil war in 2023. Since December 2023, he has supported the Rapid Support Forces and the Sudan Liberation Movement - Transitional Council (SLM-TC). He is the co-founder and former president of the SLM-TC.

== Biography ==
=== Early life ===
Abdelrahman was born in the village of Daba Nayra, near Tawila, North Darfur, Sudan. He studied at Tawila South School for elementary school, Tawila West Intermediate School for middle school, and the Kass Secondary School for Boys in South Darfur for high school. He attended Omdurman Islamic University, where he received a bachelor's degree in Economics and Political Science in 2003.

=== War in Darfur ===
In 2003, immediately after graduating from university, he joined the ranks of the Sudan Liberation Movement (SLM). He became an administrative assistant of SLM commander-in-chief Abdelkadir Abdelrahman Qaddoura. He then served as the director of deputy commander-in-chief Abdul Kabir Haroun el-Rashid, until Rashid's death in a battle where Abdelrahman survived. Abdelrahman served as the director of the office of former deputy-commander in chief Mohammed Adam Abdel el-Salam Tarada, a senior commander in Abdul Wahid al-Nur (SLM-AW), until Tarada's death in battle.

Between 2006 and 2011, Abdelrahman served as the spokesman for SLM-AW. In 2012, he was appointed deputy commander of the Sudan Revolutionary Front. Abdelrahman was captured by Sudanese government forces on October 23, 2017, and imprisoned at Al-Huda prison in Omdurman until July 4, 2019, amid the Sudanese revolution. Abdelrahman was appointed as the representative for the freed SLM detainees in the wake of the revolution. As the representative, he called for equal rights for all Sudanese.

During negotiations for the Juba Peace Agreement, Abdelrahman served as the chief negotiator for the Sudan Liberation Movement - Transitional Council, a group he co-founded. The SLM-TC aligned with the Forces of Freedom and Change (FFC-CC), and continued to remain aligned with the FFC through the start of the Sudanese civil war in 2023.

=== Governorship ===
Abdelrahman was appointed governor of North Darfur on June 14, 2021, alongside Khamis Abakar in West Darfur and Ahmed al-Omda in Blue Nile State. Abdelrahman, Abakar, and al-Omda were all former rebels from these areas appointed to gubernatorial positions as a result of the JPA. He replaced Mohamed Hassan Arabi. At the time, Abdelrahman was serving as the head of the SLM-TC, and he was succeeded by El Hadi Idris. In November 2022, Abdelrahman met with Volker Türk in El Fasher to discuss the growing number of internally displaced civilians.

At the outbreak of the Sudanese civil war on April 15, 2023, and the subsequent attacks by the Rapid Support Forces on the city of El Fasher, Abdelrahman announced the creation of burial committees. He coordinated efforts from the Committee and Mediators and Elders, a group of local negotiators that established ceasefires between the RSF and SAF. Abdelrahman advocated for peace between both sides in May 2023.

In July 2023, Abdelrahman met with Darfur governor Minni Minnawi in N'Djamena alongside Mahamat Déby. This meeting happened around the time of the formation of the Darfur Joint Protection Force, which Minnawi spearheaded alongside several other militias to serve as a neutral third party to cease fighting in El Fasher.

Minnawi and parts of the JDF then sided with the Sudanese government led by Abdel Fattah al-Burhan in November 2023. On December 6, 2023, Abdelrahman met with RSF leaders in El Fasher, including the RSF's North Darfur commander Mubarak Mohammed Abu-Zaid and RSF political representative in El Fasher Fathi Mohammed Ahmed. He also said that RSF leader Hemedti, deserved the Nobel Peace Prize.

On January 1, 2024, Abdelrahman was dismissed from his post as governor by Burhan for no stated reason. Abdelrahman claimed his dismissal was because of his "refusal to support the war and wear military uniform, as the rest of the state governors did." Abdelrahman also backed the position of SLM-TC president El Hadi Idris regarding Idris' decision to remain neutral in the war, sparking an internal conflict between neutral and pro-SAF groups within the SLM-TC. Abdelrahman was succeeded by Al-Hafiz Bakhit Mohammed as the government-appointed governor of North Darfur.

In February 2025, Abdelrahman became the president of the SLM-TC. He joined the Tasis parallel government spearheaded by the RSF and other groups. The SLM-TC also began cooperating militarily with the RSF in February 2025, with Abdelrahman saying that the group established a base in Korma northwest of El Fasher.
