= Bara District (Sudan) =

Bara محلية بارا
- District
- Country: Sudan
- State: North Kordofan

Area
  - Total: 11,563 km^{2} (4,464 sq mi)

Bara, also Barah, is a district of North Kordofan state, Sudan. The administrative center is the town of Bara. In 2008, the population was 361,206. The area of the district is 11,563 km^{2}.

== See also ==
- Barah massacre
