= Chevrolet (disambiguation) =

Chevrolet, nicknamed Chevy, is an American automobile brand by General Motors.

The name Chevrolet may also refer to:

== People ==
- Arthur Chevrolet (1884–1946), Swiss-American racer and businessman
- Gaston Chevrolet (1892–1920), Swiss-American racer and businessman
- Louis Chevrolet (1878–1941), Swiss-American racer and businessman who founded the Chevrolet car company

== Sports ==
- Chevrolet Warriors, a South African cricket team
- 2012 Chevrolet Detroit Belle Isle Grand Prix, an IZOD IndyCar Series race held in Detroit

== Places & buildings ==
- Chevrolet, Kentucky, an unincorporated community in Harlan County, Kentucky, United States
- Chevrolet Hall, a convention center in Belo Horizonte, Brazil

== Media ==
- Chevrolet (film), a Spanish film from 1997
- "Chevrolet" (song), a 2023 song by Dustin Lynch

== See also ==
- Chevy (disambiguation)
- El chevrolé, a Uruguayan film from 1999
- Chevrelet, a military base in Sudan
