= Al Zorg =

Village in Sudan

Al Zorg الزورج
- Village
- Location of Al Zorg in Sudan
- Coordinates: 15°05′27.6″N 24°49′55.2″E
- Country: Sudan
- State: North Darfur
- Control: Rapid Support Forces
- Established: 2017
- Founder: Rapid Support Forces
- Time zone: UTC+2 (CAT)

Al Zorg, also known as Al Zurq, El Zurug and Zurug, is a planned village and paramilitary base in North Darfur, Sudan. It is a key military site in the region as it is the only military base located near Sudan's border with Libya and Chad and the capital of North Darfur, El Fasher.

== History ==
Al Zorg was created by the Rapid Support Forces near the end of the Darfur Conflict around 2017 [The Darfur "conflict" did not end "around 2017." See, e.g., https://sudanreeves.org/category/briefs-advocacy-2018/page/2/ . According to Juma Dagalo, the mayor of the town and the uncle of Hemedti, the land rightfully belongs to the Mahariya because it was gifted to them by the British, and that the people of his ethnic group wanted to settle down. This claim of empty land has been disputed by several ethnic groups including the Zaghawa, who claim that the RSF used similar tactics as the Janjaweed to empty the land.

The Zaghawa have claimed that clashes between Arab settlers in the region had been going on since 1997. However, in 2017, Omar al Bashir's government enabled the RSF to take control of the area and bring Arab settlers, as well as to benefit from its strategic location and resources. The RSF took control of water plants and forced over 140,000 people out of their homes to settle elsewhere, changing the town's name to from Dogi, a name from the language of the Fur, to Al Zorg.

=== Sudan Civil War (2023 - present) ===
Al Zorg has been a key point of conflict during the current civil war because it is a supply line for the RSF. In January 2024, airstrikes by the Sudanese Air Force targeted the village's military base and the home of Juma Dagalo, killing 6 of Dagalo's assistants and 12 other people and destroyed several homes. More airstrikes targeted the western areas near the main market in February and killed dozens of people.

On December 21, 2024, The Joint Darfur Force managed to temporarily capture and take control of the town from RSF forces. According to Minni Minnawi, fighting lasted for 5 hours against 6 RSF garrisons and ended with the RSF being removed from all positions in the town. RSF forces were also targeted with barrel bombs being dropped by the SAF.

Footage shows JDF fighters displaying a captured RSF armored vehicle and inspecting abandoned bases and weapons facilities. It also showed a JDF officer standing behind burning buildings and stating that they had incinerated the town and planned to advance through the rest of the Darfur States.

The RSF recaptured the town the next day on December 22. They accused the JDF of committing ethnic cleansing by killing innocent civilians and destroying homes, water wells, and vital infrastructure. The JDF denied the accusations, calling them baseless lies, and accused the RSF of violations against civilians in IDP camps and residential areas.

== Facilities ==
The town has a clinic and school made from former buildings used by the UN during UNAMID. It also has a Market that sells various goods. Plans for the city also entitle residential areas, a hospital, town squares, and an international airport. An engineer involved in the town's construction claimed that plans for a helicopter airstrip had been approved, suggesting that the area was being used for more than just civil purposes.
