= Golo reservoir =

Reservoir in Sudan

The Golo water reservoir is a reservoir located approximately seven kilometers west of El Fasher in northwestern Sudan. The dam containing the reservoir was constructed in 1947 to provide water to El Fasher. It serves as the primary water source for an estimated 270,000 people in the city and nearby communities and is crucial for the survival of the local population, providing safe and adequate water. In 2014, UNAMID reported the reservoir had lost nearly 80% of its capacity from erosion and silt deposits, with improvements to the dam expected in the future.

== Sudanese Civil War ==
The reservoir has been a center of conflict in the ongoing Sudanese civil war, which has put it at high risk of being damaged or destroyed. According to UNICEF, the deteriorating security situation and the intense conflict in and around El Fasher, Darfur, have led to a significantly growing displacement of the civilian population from the area. The scarcity of safe drinking water and health care poses a particularly grave threat to the displaced, sick, injured, and children.

UNICEF reported the fighting over the reservoir is putting families and children at risk of being cut off from safe and adequate water, increasing risk of waterborne diseases. Children suffering from acute malnutrition and weakened immune systems are particularly in danger.

On 27 May 2024, the reservoir was occupied by the Rapid Support Forces, who shut off water purification systems to El Fasher. Darfur Joint Forces then recaptured the reservoir.

== UNICEF's Statement ==
On 31 May 2024, UNICEF issued a statement calling on all parties in the Sudanese civil war to end all attacks near the reservoir and other civilian infrastructure.
