= Al-Hafiz Bakhit Mohammed =

Sudanese politician and Governor of North Darfur

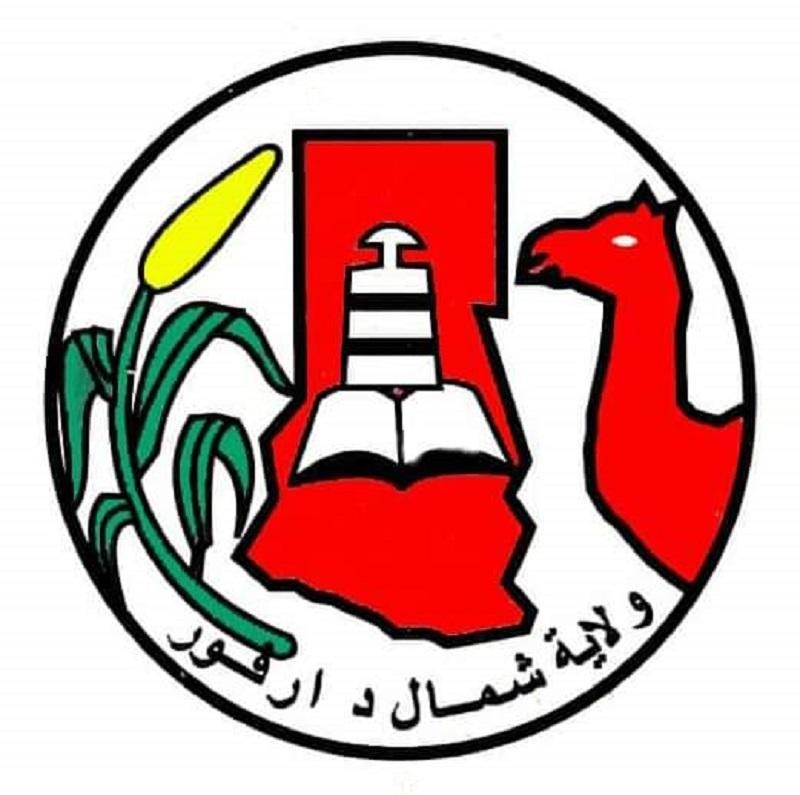
- Official Seal of North Darfur State

Governor of North Darfur
- Incumbent
- Assumed office January 1, 2024
- Preceded by: Nimir Mohammed Abdelrahman

Al-Hafiz Bakhit Mohammed (Arabic: الحافظ بخيت محمد) is a Sudanese politician who has served as the governor of North Darfur since January 1, 2024. He was appointed following the removal of his predecessor Nimir Mohammed Abdelrahman, and has led the state administration during ongoing armed conflict between the Sudanese Armed Forces (SAF) and the Rapid Support Forces (RSF).

== Governorship ==
Bakhit assumed office as acting governor of North Darfur on January 1, 2024, after Sudanese authorities dismissed Governor Nimir Mohammed Abdelrahman. No official reason for the dismissal was publicly announced at the time.

His tenure has coincided with intensified fighting between the Sudanese Armed Forces and the Rapid Support Forces, particularly in and around the state capital El Fasher. The city has experienced sustained attacks and siege like conditions amid the wider conflict in Sudan.

During the conflict, Bakhit publicly opposed calls for the evacuation of El Fasher characterizing such appeals as propaganda and stating that the city would remain under government control despite continued RSF attacks.

He has announced measures aimed at supporting civilians affected by the fighting, including coordination with local committees to facilitate humanitarian assistance and food distribution in El Fasher and nearby displacement camps.

In May 2025, Bakhit issued decrees removing several traditional leaders in North Darfur. According to Darfur Native Human Rights reporting, the decisions were based on allegations that the leaders had collaborated with armed groups and undermined state authority during the conflict.

He also approved emergency economic measures intended to stabilize local markets and ensure the availability of basic food supplies amid shortages linked to the siege of El Fasher.

In June 2025, Bakhit urged residents of El Fasher not to respond to calls to leave the city amid deteriorating humanitarian conditions and announced emergency support measures including funding for community-based food distribution centers known locally as takayas.

== Prior public service ==
Before becoming governor, Bakhit represented the Government of North Darfur State at official events including the handover of the UNAMID Kutum Team Site in 2021.
