= Abdel-Wahid Youssef =

Sudanese politician

Governor of North Darfur
- In office 14 June 2015 – April/May 2018
- Deputy: Adam El Nahala
- Preceded by: Osman Kebir
- Succeeded by: Al-Sharief Mohamed Abad

Personal details
- Born: Abdel-Wahid Youssef Ibrahim
- Occupation: Politician, engineer

Abdel-Wahid Youssef Ibrahim is a Sudanese engineer and politician. He served as governor of North Darfur between June 2015 and April/May 2018.

== Career ==
Youssef is an engineer. On 14 June 2015 Youssef succeeded Osman Kebir as governor of North Darfur. Upon his arrival he was immediately asked by people from the Zamzam camp for protection against militias and the providing of basic services. In July 2015, shortly after starting his term as governor, he stated he wished to fight harsly against armed gangs and criminals. Emergency actions were declared by the North Darfur government, bans were also instituted against check points set up by others than the army or police, wearing of face-covering veils, vehicles without license plates and the carrying of arms by non-regular forces. In the capital of North Darfur, El Fasher, unlicensed vehicles were seized, shots were also fired between security forces and militias. Youssef warned both the Sudanese Armed Forces and the government-supported militia Rapid Support Forces that they also would be held accountable to the law.

In August 2015 a North Darfur official stated that the government under Youssef banned flights by the United Nations–African Union Mission in Darfur (UNAMID). Youssef's government refuted the claims, stating that only the federal government would be able to do so.

During Youssef's term in office in 2016 tens of thousands of Darfuri refugees returned from eastern Chad to North Dafur.

In April 2018 Youssef criticized the slow progression of UNAMID's activities regarding the stabilisation plan in North Darfur. He called for a change of mandate or the actual use of its possibilities. He also wanted more infrastructure development by UNAMID. By 18 May 2018 an acting governor was in charge of North Darfur and by 30 May Al-Sharief Mohamed Abad had taken over as governor.
