= May 2025 Nyala airstrike =

- Part of the Sudanese civil war (2023-present) and the aftermath of the Battle of Nyala
- Type: Bombing
- Location: Nyala Airport, Sudan
- Planned by: Sudan
- Target: Rapid Support Forces
- Objective: Damage the RSF stronghold
- Date: 4 May 2025
- Executed by: Sudanese Air Force
- Outcome: SAF operational success
- Casualties: UAE: 4 officers killed

On May 4, 2025, the Sudanese Air Force bombed the Nyala Airport and destroyed an Emirati cargo plane.

== Background ==
In April 2023, the RSF broke away from working with the Sudanese government and started the war in Sudan by launching attacks across the country due to tension earlier 2023. By May 2025, the RSF had lost momentum, especially in the Butana. The RSF then threatened to attack Port Sudan which it later did. After RSF's drone attacks on Port Sudan and Kassala, the SAF retaliated by attacking RSF's stronghold in Darfur

== Attack and casualties ==
On 4 May, an Emirati military cargo aircraft was about to start taking off from the Nyala airport, it was immediately bombed. The attack also destroyed key infrastructure in the airport. The UAE later confirmed the attack and added to the proof of the United Arab Emirates funding the Rapid Support Forces against the government. After the attack, it was said RSF failed to protect its stronghold of the Nyala Airport.
