= Al-Sharief Mohamed Abad =

Sudanese politician

Governor of North Darfur
- In office May 2018 – 22 February 2019
- Preceded by: Abdel-Wahid Youssef (Note: In April 2018 Abdel-Wahid Youssef was governor of North Darfur. By 18 May he had been replaced by an (unnamed) acting governor. On 31 May Abad was in charge.)
- Succeeded by: Al Naeem Khidir Mursal

Personal details
- Occupation: Politician

Al-Sharief Mohamed Abad (Note: Also spelled Al-Sharif Mohamed Abbad, El-Sherief Mohamed Abbad Sumuh and El Sharif Mohamed Abad Samouh.) is a Sudanese politician. He served as governor of North Darfur between May 2018 and February 2019.

== Career ==
By 31 May 2018 Abad was serving as governor of North Darfur. In this capacity he met Steven Koutsis, the Chargé d’Affaires of the United States to Sudan, who pressed the Sudanese government to continue the disarmament campaign. In June 2018 Abad's government announced a plan for the internally displaced person (IDP) camps around the capital of North Darfur, offering various options for the inhabitants to remain or to return to their home villages. In October 2018 his government also established a Humanitarian Aid Coordinative Office to work together with the Sudanese Ministry of Health and Social Development. In November 2018 Abad accompanied Hemedti, the leader of the Rapid Support Forces, on a visit to the Zamzam camp. There were protests against the visit which led to six individuals being arrested.

During the Sudanese revolution, Sudanese president Omar al-Bashir, on 22 February 2019 called a state of emergency and replaced all civil governors of the states of Sudan with military governors. Retired major general Al Naeem Khidir Mursal was appointed for North Darfur.
