= Bara, Sudan =

Bara بارا
- Town
- Location of Bara in Sudan
- Coordinates: 13°41′39″N 30°22′1″E
- Country: Sudan
- State: North Kordofan
- Time zone: UTC+2 (CAT)

Bara (Arabic: بارا), also known as Barah, is a town in Bara district in North Kordofan, central Sudan. Bara is located approximately 59 km north-northeast of El Obeid, the capital of North Kordofan, and it is the state’s second-largest city. The city lies at a strategic road junction connecting Khartoum with El Obeid.

During the Sudanese civil war, Bara changed hands several times between the Sudanese Armed Forces and the Rapid Support Forces. In March 2026, the SAF briefly recaptured the town in the Battle of Bara, before the RSF retook it ten days later. RSF attacks on villages near Bara in May 2026 became known as the Bara massacre. The SAF regained control of Bara in July 2026. By October, volunteers had recovered and buried more than 600 bodies in Bara and surrounding villages, most of them civilians, while hundreds more were reported to remain unburied.

== History ==
=== Early history ===
Bara was the deathplace of the 18th century Darfurian sultan Muhammad Tayrab, soon after he had conquered Kordofan.

In 1821, the Battle of Bara was a decisive battle in Muhammad Ali Pasha's conquest of Kordofan, in which forces under Muhammad Bey al-Daftardar defeated the Kordofan army and subsequently entered El Obeid.

=== Sudanese civil war ===
Since April 2023, Sudan has been in a civil war between the internationally recognized government of Sudan controlled by the Sudanese Armed Forces (SAF) and the rival Government of Peace and Unity led by the Rapid Support Forces (RSF) paramilitary group.

On 5 July 2023, RSF forces attacked Bara, with the violence continuing into the early hours of the following day. Armed residents unsuccessfully tried to prevent them from entering the town, where they looted the market, shops, pharmacies and homes, and seized private vehicles.

On 2 January 2024, an RSF unit attacked Bara and seized the police station. The raid followed the killing of three RSF members by local resistance groups the previous week, which had increased tensions in the town and nearby villages.

In October 2025, Bara came under RSF control. Multiple reports described retaliatory killings and summary executions of civilians accused of supporting the SAF, with estimates ranging from dozens to hundreds killed. Other reported abuses included abductions, arbitrary detention and sexual violence. Bara was strategically important because the RSF used it as a base for drone attacks on El Obeid. By 31 October 2025, the humanitarian situation in North Kordofan remained alarming, with nearly 36,000 people displaced from Bara in just one week, according to the IOM.

In March 2026, Bara was the scene of fighting between the SAF and the RSF. Supported by airstrikes, the SAF recaptured the town from the RSF on 5 March, killing at least 51 people. The fighting displaced tens of thousands of civilians. On 16 March 2026, the RSF retook Bara in a dawn attack.

On 25 July 2026, Darfur governor Minni Minnawi said that the Sudanese army and allied forces had seized Bara and nearby areas from the RSF. He claimed that the operations had caused heavy RSF personnel and equipment losses, although neither the army nor the RSF had confirmed the reported gains at the time. Later that month, Al Jazeera confirmed that the army had retaken the town and reported that, according to the UN, around 40,000 people from Bara and the surrounding area had fled and had not yet returned.

In August 2026, sources who entered Bara after the SAF recaptured the town described it as almost entirely deserted, with bodies lying in streets, homes and shallow graves and only two elderly residents reportedly found alive. Local volunteers and officials said hundreds of bodies remained uncollected in Bara and nearby areas, while unexploded ordnance and possible contamination of shallow wells posed further risks to civilians.

By October 2026, volunteers in Bara and surrounding villages had recovered and buried more than 600 bodies, most of them civilians. Local activists and volunteers attributed most of the deaths to revenge killings by the RSF after the group entered Bara in October 2025. Hundreds of additional bodies were reported to remain unburied in and around the town. One volunteer told Middle East Eye that "there is now no life left in Bara", while others warned of deteriorating sanitary conditions and the spread of disease.
