= Libya–Sudan relations =

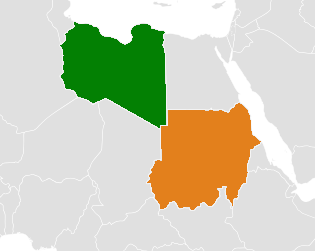

- Libya: Sudan

The Libya–Sudan relations refers to the long historical relations between Libya and Sudan, both being Arab countries.

Libya and Sudan share an isolated border along a corner of northwestern Sudan that neither government has ever fully controlled. This state of affairs left open the possibility for a variety of real and perceived activities in the region that caused Khartoum to suspect that Libya periodically acted against its interests. Conflict between Libya and Sudan has occurred intermittently since relations between the two countries began to deteriorate in 1972.

Under Colonel Muammar Gaddafi Libya continued to pursue foreign policy directed along ideological and pragmatic lines. This resulted in several instances of conflict between the two nations between 1972 and 1976. In 1976, Sudan charged that Libya was involved in a terrorist plot against its government. This led to a severance of relations between the nations. In the late 1970s and 1980s Sudanese and Libyan foreign policy clashed over several regional conflicts. These included the Chadian–Libyan conflict, the Libyan–Egyptian War and Libyan support for Ugandan dictator Idi Amin. In these cases Libya's conflict with Sudan resulted from Gaddafi's regional goals of pan-Arabism and was heavily influenced by relations with Egypt. The Chadian–Libyan conflict in particular influenced the foreign policy of several African countries towards Libya. Pro-Libyan supporters were set against an anti-Libyan side which included Sudan and Egypt. Some sub-Saharan countries, such as Zaire, supported the anti-Libyan forces in Chad out of fear of a Libyan expansion. In 1986, Libya assisted the Mahdi government under Sadiq al-Mahdi to assume power in Sudan, resuming relations between the two nations. After this point both nations employed markedly different foreign policy strategies. Sudan adopted a non-aligned course, trying to obtain western aid while building better relationships with Arab states. This included cooperative ties with Libya. Libya began to pursue stronger regional connections, with Gaddafi attempting to increase his influence in the African continent. This changed the nature of relations between the two nations.

== History ==
=== Early relationship ===
Between 1967 and 1971, Libya–Sudan relations was based on a foreign policy favoring solidarity with other Arab countries. In May 1969, Gaafar Nimeiry of Sudan managed a successful coup d'état in Sudan. Later that same year, Muammar Gaddafi rose to power through a coup d'état in Libya. He initially tried to strengthen ties with Sudan and Egypt, so much so that he proposed a federation with the individual states during his first two years in power. In August 1971, Colonel Gaddafi helped reverse a communist coup against Sudanese President Nimeiry by diverting a British airliner carrying one of the coup's leaders and handing him over to Nimeiry to be hanged. However, a year later Sudan accused Libya of involvement in three successive coup attempts and subsequently severed diplomatic relations. Later during the early 1970s, President Nimeiry began to pursue a foreign policy strategy which aligned Sudan with Western powers, which conflicted with Libyan interests, weaking relations between Sudan and Libya throughout the 1970s.

Subsequent to Libya's shaky alliance with the Nimeiry regime and Gaddafi's attempt to replace it in 1976, Sudan sought out Egyptian protection to Libya's discomfort. Relations between Libya and Sudan were in many respects a consequence of relations with Egypt. In particular, the Libya-Egypt conflict in 1977 made relations between Sudan and Libya more tense. Sudan backed Egypt in this conflict and opposed Libyan military action.

=== Rifts and the 1970s ===
During the fall of 1977, Nimeiry and Sudanese opposition leaders began attempts at reconciliation. Subsequently, starting in February 1978, Libya and Sudan agreed to resume relations. However, relations soon become strained after Gaddafi condemned Sudanese support for President Anwar Sadat of Egypt who signed the September 1978 Camp David Accords. This difference of political and ideological position toward the situation in Israel, gave Gaddafi the encouragement to support plots against the Egyptian leader Anwar Sadat and Nimeiry.

Between 1978 and 1980 Gaddafi's Islamic Legion of Arab and African “volunteers” trained in Libyan guerrilla camps. They supported the factional fighting in Chad and assassinated political leaders in Chad who contested Libya's interference. Throughout the late 1970s and early 1980s, Gaddafi employed assassins to eradicate his enemies in Sudan, Niger, Senegal and the Gambia. It is also alleged that his assassins unsuccessfully attempted to kill Hermann Eilts, former U.S. ambassador to Egypt. Libya's foreign policy in the area became apparent when in 1979, Libyan forces unsuccessfully invaded Chad, marking the beginning of the Chadian-Libyan conflict. The Chadian affair crystallized African attitudes toward Libya. Sudan's pro-Chadian stance during the conflict, would mark a significant point in the relations between Sudan and Libya. When interviewed by a French press agency in late 1981, President Gaafar Nimeiry called for Gaddafi's death by whatever means possible, "even if it means drowning him in the sea or throwing him from an aeroplane." In the same interview, Nimeiry noted that his military was working with Egypt to formulate a plan to destroy Gaddafi's "subversive" influence.

=== 1980s ===
Gaddafi, who has determined Libya's foreign policy since 1969, has consistently been a proponent of Arab unity, the advancement of Islam, the Palestinian cause and anti-Western sentiments. He has also supported the elimination of Israel. Hence, Gaddafi's antagonism towards Egypt was a response to Sadat's push for a separate peace with Israel. As an additional foreign policy point, Libyan actions in the region often signified strong expansionist aims. This provides the context for understanding how, in January 1981 Radio Tripoli announced the intended merger of Libya and Chad, after Gaddafi said that Chad was part of Libya's “vital living space.” This announcement alarmed neighboring African states including Sudan. They had already suffered from Gaddafi's participation in trying to disrupt the governments of Sudan, Egypt and Tunisia through coups and assassinations after failed attempts at unification. By the end of January 1981, the Organisation of African Unity (OAU) formally condemned Libya's intentions for unification with Chad and asked Gaddafi to remove his troops from Chad immediately.

Gaddafi's resentment of Western influence in the region becomes apparent when in 1981 Chester Crocker, the Assistant Secretary of State for African Affairs announced that the US was willing to funnel military aid to any of Gaddafi's neighbors who saw the problem as they saw it. This provided Sudan another avenue to obtain US foreign aid. Sudan received $250 million in economic and military aid in 1982, and more than $200 million in 1983 from the United States.

In 1983, six years after Nimeiry and Sudanese opposition leaders began attempts at reconciliation, opposition from the Sudan People's Liberation Movement and its military wing, the Sudan People's Liberation Army emerged against Nimeiry's northern focused policies. During this time, Libya's cooperative foreign policy towards Sudan had changed drastically since the early 1970s. While opposition to Nimeiry was mounting, Gaddafi provided financial and material support to these opposition groups and other anti-Nimeiry rebel groups and organizations, including Anyanya II and the Sudanese People's Liberation Army (SPLA). While Gaddafi's foreign policy has been imbued with controversy and surprises, (a prime example relates to why Gaddafi, an Arab nationalist supported Ethiopia, a primarily Christian African country, against Sudan (under Nimeiry), an Arab country with a Muslim majority) Libya's support of anti-Nimeiry groups is understandable within the context of Libya's anti-western foreign policy and Nimeiry's support for the Camp David Accords.

Nimeiry prevailed against the 1983 Libyan backed opposition but relations between the two countries continued to suffer when in March 1984, Nimeiry claimed that a Libyan Air Force Plane, a Soviet-built Tupolev TU-22 bomber, based at an airfield in the Al Kufra oasis in south-east Libya, had killed five people in an air raid on Omdurman. In reaction to the numerous coups in the region, in 1985, the National Democratic Alliance (NDA) was formed when all unions and political parties except the NIF signed the “Charter of the National Alliance” and the “Charter to Protect Democracy” in order to incite civil disobedience against future coups. Following this, on 6 April 1985, a group of military officers, led by Lieutenant General Abdel Rahman Swar al-Dahab, overthrew Nimeiry. Following Nimeiry's fall in 1985, Gaddafi immediately abandoned military support for the Sudan People's Liberation Army (SPLA) and provided his full support to Nimeiri's former Muslim opponents in the North, namely Sadiq al-Mahdi’s Umma Party.

On April 9, 1985 Lieutenant General Dhahab ordered the formation of a fifteen-man Transitional Military Council (TMC) to rule Sudan. The TMC suspended the constitution; dissolved the SSU, the secret police, and the parliament and region assemblies dismissed regional governors and their minister; and released hundreds of political detainees from Kober Prison.

In July 1985, Libyan-Sudanese relations once again fluctuated, this time becoming stronger after a military protocol was signed between the two countries. Despite Gaddafi’s strong support for the Sudanese opposition leader Sadiq al-Mahdi, in December 1985, many Libyans labeled as “Islamic extremists,” were gathered and exiled from Sudan.

In February 1986 the International Monetary Fund declared Sudan bankrupt, after the Dhahab government refused to accept IMF economic austerity measures. Later that year Sadiq al-Mahdi was declared the Prime Minister of Sudan. In a change of tone towards Libya, Mahdi unsuccessfully attempted to mediate the Libyan-Chadian conflict. The Mahdi government also permitted Libya to station some of its military forces in Darfur. From this position the troops assisted Chadian rebels in carrying out raids against government forces in Chad. However, in response to pressures from Egypt and the United States shortly thereafter, the Sudanese government requested a withdrawal of Libyan forces.

On June 30, 1989, Colonel (later Lieutenant General) Omar al-Bashir overthrew Mahdi and created the Revolutionary Command Council for National Salvation to govern Sudan. Early in 1990 Sudan and Libya discussed the idea of unification between the two nations. In July of that year the first meeting of the Libyan-Sudanese Joint General People's Committee was held, and the Councils of Ministers of the two countries met in a combined session. The chief result of this meeting was greater economic cooperation, not the previously discussed political unification. Libya and Sudan signed a trade and development agreement that had Libyan investment in agricultural projects in exchange for guaranteed access for the Sudanese agricultural products. In October 1993, the Revolutionary Command Council which was created a few years earlier was dissolved. The leader of the coup d'état, Lieutenant General Bashir, became a civilian president, and all the vital offices of government were now held by members of the NIF political party or their sympathizers.

=== 1990s ===
“The pro-Libyan attitude of black African states has prompted Gaddafi to adopt a new foreign policy towards the continent. “In general, the future of Libya’s relations with the countries of the region is likely to be influenced by Gaddafi’s rapprochement with the Arab countries and with the West.” Libyan and Sudanese ties were further cemented when in February 1999 an economic cooperation agreement was signed between the two countries and four other Sahel states. As alluded to earlier, Libya's relations with Sudan were in many respects a consequence of relations with Egypt. “Particularly important is the rapprochement with Egypt. The two countries have agreed to integrate their economies and to co-ordinate their African policies, especially in relations to Sudan. In August 1999, at a summit conference held in Cairo, Egyptian President Hosni Mubarak and Gaddafi agreed to mediate an end to Sudan’s civil war. The regimes of both Libya and Egypt have confronted and/or continue to confront armed Islamic opposition and consequently both share an interest in Sudan, a country that has been accused of harboring radical Islamic groups. Above all, however, the Egyptian-Libyan initiative seems to reflect a joint fear on the part of the two countries that Washington supports the secession of southern Sudan and the break-up of an Arab country.”

Relations between Libya and Sudan were strained after 2002 due to Muammar Gaddafi and the Libyan Army's strong support for the Darfur Liberation Front. This resulted in DLF troops militarily fighting against the Anti-Gaddafi forces in the First Libyan Civil War, and subsequently Bashir's government and the Sudanese Armed Forces providing direct support for the Anti-Gaddafi rebels as a response.

=== 21st century ===
In the early 2000s, Sudan and Libya made concerted efforts to improve relations. The last half of 2002 witnessed a series of high-level meetings between Libya and Sudan. The Sudanese foreign minister at the time, Mustafa Uthman Isma’il, and his Libyan counterpart agreed to work for peace in Sudan within the framework of Sudanese unity, establish a committee for political coordination, and take measures to implement agreements on customs, the Nile international fund, trade, taxation, and investment. Also in 2002, the Higher Ministerial Committee for Libyan–Sudanese Integration agreed on a number of political and practical issues, including condemnation of American threats to launch “unjustified aggression” against Iraq. In 2004, as the crisis in Darfur worsened, Libya hosted informal consultations between representatives of the Sudanese government and the rebel movements. The rebels rejected the Libyan initiative and insisted that the Joint Commission of the African Union serve as the principal interlocutor. This development did not deter First Vice President Taha in 2005 from urging al-Qadhafi to help find a solution to the Darfur crisis. Relations between Libya and Sudan were generally good but remained unpredictable, primarily as a result of the mercurial leadership in Tripoli. Sudan saw al-Qadhafi as a periodic problem that needed to be contained. It was better to bring him into the tent than to try to exclude him. As a result, Sudan did not object to al-Qadhafi's efforts to mediate both the Darfur conflict and the earlier conflict in Eastern Sudan. The two countries settled on a policy of coexistence.

In 2011, the Libyan Civil War occurred. Despite enjoying good bilateral relations since the end of Cold War, Omar al-Bashir soon declared support for the opposition, blaming Gaddafi for supporting Darfur separatists. The Sudanese Government armed the Libyan National Transitional Council, which eventually toppled the government of Gaddafi. With the fall and death of Libyan leader, the Bashir hailed the fall of Gaddafi on his trip to Libya in 2012. The new Libyan leadership in 2011 also acknowledged their gratitude to Sudan for arming them against government forces.

In July 2017, General Khalifa Haftar of the Libyan National Army ordered the closing of the Sudanese consulate in the town of Kufra, and expelled 12 diplomats. The consul and 11 other consular staff were given 72 hours to leave the country. The reason given was that the way it conducted its work was "damaging to Libyan national security." The Sudanese government protested and summoned the Libyan chargé d'affaires in Khartoum, Ali Muftah Mahroug, in response. Sudan recognises the Government of National Accord in Tripoli as the legitimate government of Libya, not the House of Representatives that is backed by General Haftar. In 2022, Sudan established an embassy and consulate located in Tripoli to provide services to the Sudanese residents.

== See also ==
- Federation of Arab Republics
- Libya–Sudan border
- Pan-Africanism
- Pan-Arabism
