= Mohamed Hassan Arabi =

Sudanese politician

Mohamed Hassan Arabi is a Sudanese politician. He served as governor of North Darfur until June 2021.

== Career ==
In December 2019 Arabi was involved with Forces of Freedom and Change (FFC) and their list of candidates for the governors of the states of Sudan. In March 2020, Arabi, as member of the FFC, was a member of the Sudanese transitional government, and argued for the removal of the death penalty for apostasy.

By September 2020 Arabi served as governor of North Darfur. As governor Arabi oversaw the arrest of several National Congress Party politicians from the former regime in February 2021. In this period there were also riots which he stated were planned by the former regime. On 13 June 2021 Sudanese prime minister Abdalla Hamdok appointed Nimir Mohammed Abdelrahman as successor of Arabi.

In May 2025 Arabi criticized the decision by the Sudanese government to sever Sudan–United Arab Emirates relations as a farce. On 15 December 2025, the Sudanese Congress Party expelled Arabi and five other members for signing the charter of the Tasis alliance.
