= Al Maliha =

Village in Sudan

- City
- Country: Sudan
- State: North Darfur
- Time zone: UTC+2 (CAT)

Al Maliha is a city in North Darfur, Sudan. The city is located 210 kilometres northeast of El Fasher.

== History ==
The Battle of Al Maliha was fought in the city during the Sudanese civil war. There were reports of hundreds of casualties. Thousands of residents were displaced.

== See also ==
- List of cities in Sudan
