= Future Bank (Sudan) =

Future Bank المستقبل
- Central bank of: Government of Peace and Unity
- Headquarters: Nyala, Sudan
- Ownership: Future Financial and Banking Services Company Ltd
- Governor: Yahya Hussein Jangoul
- Currency: Sudanese pound (ISO 4217)
- Reserves: None

Future Bank is a commercial organization which functions as de facto Central Bank of the parts of Western Sudan under the control of Government of Peace and Unity.

== History ==
The bank was launched in early January 2026 in Nyala as a semi-electronic money exchange. On 29 January a second branch was opened in Ed Daein. Simultaneously a mobile app named "Future Money Services" affiliated with the bank was launched on Google and Apple Stores. The bank facilitated transfer of Sudanese pounds. The bank was owned by the Future Financial and Banking Services Company Limited, whose shareholder included several prominent Darfur businessmen. A key architect in the design of the system was Mostafa Abdel Nabi, a chief financial official RSF based in Abu Dhabi.

On 11 May 2026, the Tasis Prime Minister Mohamed Hassan al-Ta'aishi issued a decree establishing a "Transitional Currency Council" tasked with monetary stabilization, banking regulation, and the issuance of banking licenses in RSF-held areas. On May 21, 2026, the Tasis government appointed Hussein Yahya Jangoul, a former governor of the Central Bank of Sudan, as governor of the parallel central bank in Nyala.

On 14 September 2026 the bank expanded to El Geneina in West Darfur, offering transactions in Sudanese pounds and US dollars.

== International ties ==
The bank reportedly is owned by a company based in the United Arab Emirates. A transfer agency based in Kampala, Uganda is reportedly accepting deposits in Ugandan shillings for onward crediting to Future bank clients in Darfur.
