= Kabkabiya District =

District of Darfur, Sudan

Kabkabiya كبكابية
- District
- Interactive map of Kabkabiya
- Country: Sudan
- State: North Darfur

Population (2008)
  - Total: 191,414

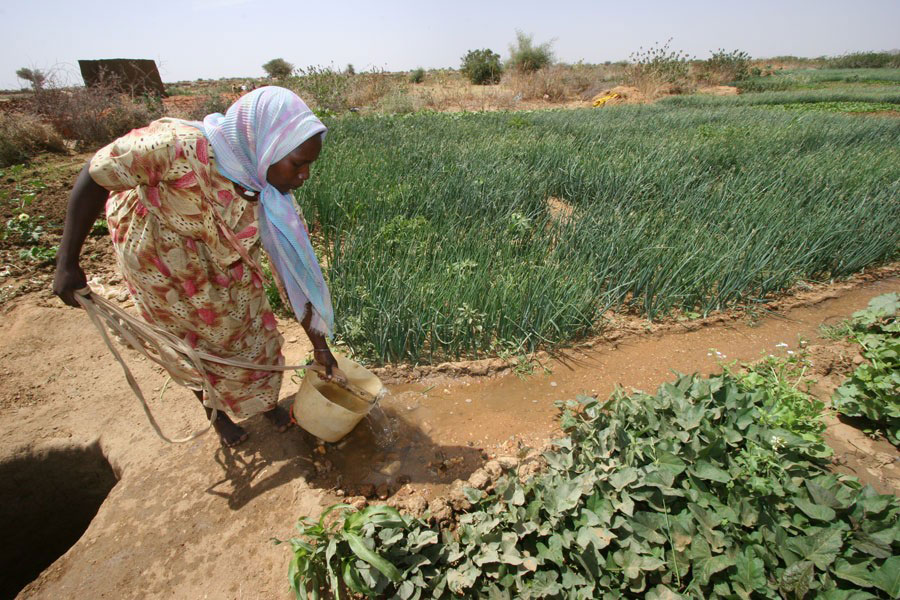
A woman irrigates crops in Kabkabiya camp in North Darfur.

Kabkabiya is a district of North Darfur state, Sudan. The town it is named after derives its name from the Fur phrase kebi kebbia ("they threw away their shields"), commemorating Darfur's victory over Wadai there during the reign of Ahmad Bukr (c. 1700 – c. 1720).

Kabkabiya is home to a military base and has been a main location with the Battle of Kabkabiya during the 2023 Sudan war. In May 2004, it held 45,000–95,000 internally displaced persons during the War in Darfur.

Its town of the same name was one of few prior to the Anglo-Egyptian invasion of Sudan and an important access point to the caravan trade west of Kobbei under the Sultanate of Darfur.
