= Malik al-Tayeb Khojali =

Sudanese military official

Malik al-Tayeb Khojali al-Nil is a Sudanese military official. He served as (acting) governor of North Darfur between 2019 and July 2020. Since August 2025 he is deputy chief of staff for operations of the Sudanese Armed Forces.

== Life ==
As of 7 May 2019 Khojali, as major general, was working as acting governor of North Darfur. In this capacity he stated that he was implementing the guidance of the Transitional Military Council, in particular the order of closure of all National Congress Party facilities.

On 4 November 2019, Abdalla Hamdok, as prime minister of Sudan, became the first leader to visit Darfur in 16 years. Hamdok and Khojali together visited a camp for displaced persons in El Fasher. Later that same month he urged to facilitate humanitarian access in the region. In February 2020, Khojali received ambassadors of states willing to supply funds for projects for peace and stability building.

Late June/early July 2020 the inhabitants of the village of Fata Bornu protested against Khojali, accusing him of siding with the Arabs and demanding his resignation. On 12 July Khojali ordered his security forces to remove themselves from the area. The next day there was an attack by Arabs on the village. After this and several violent protest Khojali later that month declared a state of emergency in North Darfur. By 27 July 2020 Khojali was no longer governor of North Sudan but army commander of the western region.

On 18 August 2025 Khojali, then lieutenant general, was appointed by Abdel Fattah al-Burhan as deputy chief of staff for operations of the Sudanese Armed Forces.
