= Second Battle of Dilling =

2026 Sudanese civil war battle

- Part of Sudanese civil war (2023–present), Kordofan campaign
Date	26 April-19 May 2026(3 weeks and 3 days)
Location	Dilling, South Kordofan 11.9569° N, 29.5572° E
Result	SAF victory

Belligerents
Sudanese Government (Note: Transitional Sovereignty Council); SAF	Government of Peace and Unity; RSF; New Sudan (SPLM–N (al-Hilu))

Units involved
Sudanese Armed Forces	Rapid Support Forces Sudan People's Liberation Movement–North (al-Hilu)

The Second Battle of Dilling started after Rapid Support Forces (RSF) and the Sudan People's Liberation Movement (SPLM) surrounded Dilling, South Kordofan on 26 April 2026.

There is currently a humanitarian crisis where there are famine like conditions in South Kordofan and up to 115,000 people are currently displaced as of 27 of April

On 19 May 2026, The Sudanese Armed Forces broke the second siege of Dilling, The siege lasted 24 days from when it started on 26 april to 19 may 2026.
