= Battle of Bara =

2026 Sudanese civil war battle

- Part of the Sudanese civil war (2023–present) and the Kordofan Campaign
| Date | 5 March – 27 July 2026 |
| Location | Bara, Sudan |
| Result | First Battle: RSF victory: SAF recapture the town on 5 march.; RSF reoccupies the town after 10 days on March 16; Start of the Bara massacre; Second Battle: SAF Victory: SAF recapture the town on 27 July; End of the Bara massacre |

Belligerents
| (Sudan) Government of Peace and Unity; RSF | Government of Sudan (TSC); SAF |

Casualties and losses
| Dozens killed 32 military vehicles destroyed 10 other captured | 500 killed 45 vehicles destroyed (according to RSF) |
- 51 civilians killed

The Battle of Bara, was the March 2026 initial recapture of Bara, North Kordofan, during the Sudanese civil war (2023–present) from the RSF by the SAF, before the RSF seized control of the town again after 10 days of its recapture by the SAF. Subsequently, the Sudanese army regained control in July 26. The battle and its aftermath devastated Bara, where volunteers had recovered and buried more than 600 bodies by October 2026, most of them civilians.

The Battle of Bara is also the name of a decisive battle in 1821 in Muhammad Ali Pasha's conquest of Kordofan, in which forces under Muhammad Bey al-Daftardar defeated the Kordofan army and subsequently entered El Obeid.

== Background ==
Since October 2025, Bara had been controlled by the RSF.

On February 15, the SAF destroyed an air defense system of the RSF in Abu Zabad area of the region. The system was a Chinese short-range model FB-10, designed to take down low-altitude targets, such as drones, helicopters, and aircraft flying at low altitudes. Because of this, the SAF could freely conduct airstrikes on Bara.

Before the SAF's assault on the town, the Sudanese Air Force had carried out airstrikes on the town, inflicting significant casualties among RSF's lines. These attacks were followed by a surprise assault on RSF's positions in north El Obeid from Dankoj, before they expelled the RSF from Bara.

== Battle ==
=== SAF first initial recapture ===
On March 5, the SAF expelled the RSF from Bara following a military operation, this operation resulted in the loss of dozens of RSF soldiers and the destruction of 32 military vehicles and the capture of 10 others. Bara's recapture was strategically critical, as the town was a launch point for RSF's drones on El Obeid. Tens of thousands of civilians have been displaced from Bara, as control over the town have shifted rapidly.

=== RSF recapture ===
On March 16, Bara was seized by the RSF once again, just after 10 days of SAF's recapture. This was the third time of power shifting in Bara since April 2023. The RSF have deployed dozens of combat vehicles, drones, and artillery in its recapture of the town, forcing the SAF to retreat to the town of al-Dankoj. The RSF have claimed that it killed 500 SAF soldiers and captured 45 vehicles, though, Reuters was unable to verify these claims.

=== SAF's second recapture ===
On 25 July, the SAF launched an offensive to recapture areas of North Kordofan, including Bara. The military said that the forces have retaken Bara, along with other major areas in the state. The SAF also claimed it destroyed 73 RSF combat vehicles, seizing an unknown amount of vehicles, and killing several RSF fighters and officers.

In August 2026, sources who entered Bara after the SAF recaptured the town described it as almost entirely deserted, with bodies lying in streets, homes and shallow graves and only two elderly residents reportedly found alive. Local volunteers and officials said hundreds of bodies remained uncollected in Bara and nearby areas, while unexploded ordnance and possible contamination of shallow wells posed further risks to civilians.

=== Recovery and burial of bodies ===
By October 2026, volunteers in Bara and surrounding villages had recovered and buried more than 600 bodies, most of them civilians. Local activists and volunteers attributed most of the deaths to revenge killings by the RSF after the group entered Bara in October 2025. Hundreds of additional bodies were reported to remain unburied in and around the town. One volunteer told Middle East Eye that "there is now no life left in Bara", while others warned of deteriorating sanitary conditions and the spread of disease.
