= Kobbei =

Kobbei Kobbai, Kubay, Kubayh, Kobbe, Kobbé
- town
- Location in Sudan
- Coordinates: 14°4′0″N 23°58′0″E
- Country: Sudan
- State: North Darfur
- Elevation: 3,135 ft (956 m)

Population (2010)
  - Total: 0

Kobbei (also Kobbai, Kubay or Kubayh) is a former town in North Darfur of western Sudan, west of Al-Fashir. It is now deserted. At its peak in the 19th century it was a thriving town, the largest in Darfur, with a population of up to 8,000. It declined as the wells at the oasis dried up, and the caravans first slowed, due to conflicts with al-Zubayr Rahma Mansur to the south, and then stopped with the fall of the Darfur Sultanate in 1874. The ruins are located west of Jabal Kobbei (Mount Kobbei) along the Wadi Kobbei (Kobbei Arroyo) for approximately two miles.

Kobbei was the major trading center of the Darfur Sultanate, but was dependent on long-distance trade both north-south, and to a slightly lesser extent east-west. Slaves from the south were a major component of the trade, as were ostrich feathers, camels, ivory and acacia tree gum. When al-Zubayr Rahma Mansur acquired holdings in the Bahr el Ghazal, he diverted to Khartoum significant portions of the goods coming from the south. These diversions began in 1856 and the decline in trade was significant by 1860.
