= Al Atrun =

Village in Sudan

- Location within Sudan
- Coordinates: 18°10′59″N 26°36′0″E
- Country: Sudan
- State: North Darfur
- Control: JDF
- Time zone: UTC+2 (CAT)

Al Atrun is an oasis village in North Darfur, Sudan.

== History ==
The Bir Natrun well was a major stop and one of the most famous wells in the area on the Darb El Arba'īn route.

=== Sudanese civil war (2023–present) ===
On May 19, 2025, the Joint Forces took control of the area from the Rapid Support Forces, cutting off the supply line.
