= Chevrelet =

Military base in Sudan

Chevrelet is a military base on the Sudanese side of the Libya–Sudan border.

== History ==
The base was established by the RSF in 2014 and has wells, medical camps, and other facilities.

On April 19, 2023, the Sudanese Armed Forces seized the military base from the Rapid Support Forces. This was four days into the War in Sudan. The SAF reportedly did this to prevent the flow of weapons to the RSF from that country. The RSF later recaptured the base in June 2025.
