= Bara massacre (Sudan) =

Massacre during the Sudanese civil war (2023-present)

- Part of the aftermath of the Battle of Bara and war crimes during the Sudanese civil war
- Location: Villages in West Bara locality
- Date: 28-29 May 2026
- Target: Native citizens of North Kordofan
- Attack type: Massacre
- Deaths: 58 civilians
- Perpetrator: Rapid Support Forces
- Motive: Unknown

The Bara massacre refers to the RSF attacks on the villages near Bara in North Kordofan, central Sudan in May 2026 as part of the aftermath of the fall of the city in March.

== Attacks ==
=== 28 May ===
On 28 May, during the second day of the Islamic holiday Eid Al-Adha, RSF launched a violent attack in villages in west Bara locality, including Al-Murra, Um Saddoun al-Sharif, and al-Radha. The attack was reported by the General Union of Dar Hamid Tribe. The incident had over 30 fatalities according to the tribe. The union also confirmed the attacks were used by 20 RSF combat vehicles. On the other hand, a medical group reports only 27 victims. With the Sudan Doctors Network reporting civilians were executed in a brutal manner as a violation of international humanitarian law. On 30 May, a mass grave containing 27 victims was found, raising the government's death toll to 58.

=== 29 May ===
The day after, the RSF launched second attacks. These were more focused on Al-Murrah amid a complete communications blackout. The RSF reportedly took control of satellite internet devices used by residents, which limits the flow of information and hampering coordination from the areas.

== Reactions ==
The Sudanese foreign ministry strongly condemned the massacre, and called on the United Nations and the African Union to hold RSF accountable. The ministry stated that no more than 60 civilians were killed and urged the international community to issue a condemnation. It renewed its call for the RSF to be designated as a terrorist organization, citing RSF's historical record of violence, destruction of property, and war crimes against humanity.

The National Umma Party condemned the RSF's attacks and called on both sides in the conflict to withdraw military elements from civilian areas and strictly adhere to their obligations under the international humanitarian law.
