= Battle of Nyala =

Battle during the 2023 Sudan conflict

- Part of the Darfur campaign of the Sudanese civil war (2023–present)
Date	15 April – 26 October 2023 (6 months and 11 days) (Note: The full list of clashes were between April 15 and 20, May 18 and 19, June 13 through 24, July 1, 2, 4, 20, 27, and from August 11 to October 26.)
Location	Nyala, South Darfur, Sudan
Result	RSF victory: Fighting breaks out between April 15 and April 20; Ceasefires occur between April 20 and May 5, with sporadic clashes until August 8; RSF launches an offensive on August 11, later besieging the city; RSF capture the infantry base of the 16th Infantry Division, effectively capturing Nyala

Belligerents
Sudanese government; Sudanese Armed Forces	Rapid Support Forces; Various Arab tribes; (Central African Republic) Coalition of Patriots for Change (since August 2023)

Commanders and leaders
Yasser Fadlallah Khader †; Hussein Mohamed Jawdat	Abdelrahim Dagalo (Central African Republic) Noureddine Adam (WIA)

Units involved
16th Infantry Division	Unknown

Casualties and losses
2,000+ (per RSF)	Unknown
- 100+ killed, 271+ injured 50,000+ refugees

The Battle of Nyala was a battle for control of Nyala, the capital of South Darfur in Sudan, between the paramilitary Rapid Support Forces (RSF), and the Sudanese Armed Forces during the ongoing Darfur campaign. The first battle occurred between 15 and 20 April 2023, during which hundreds were reported dead. A civilian-brokered ceasefire paused the fighting by April 20. Sporadic clashes broke out between May and July. In August 2023, the RSF launched an offensive on the city. The SAF launched air campaigns against the RSF in Nyala, with many civilian casualties in Taiba and El Matar. In late September, the RSF besieged the headquarters the SAF's 16th Infantry Division headquarters, capturing it on October 26.

== Prelude ==
In the early hours of the morning of 15 April 2023, soldiers loyal to the Rapid Support Forces started a series of assaults on key buildings in Khartoum, primarily the Khartoum International Airport. While the international airport was captured by the RSF, street battles continued throughout Khartoum and the neighboring cities of Omdurman and Bahri. The RSF also captured the presidential palace, the residence of the former Sudanese president Omar al-Bashir, and attacked a military base. Users on Facebook Live and Twitter documented the Sudanese Air Force flying above the city, and striking the RSF targets.

=== Origin in Darfur ===
The history of conflicts in Sudan has consisted of foreign invasions and resistance, ethnic tensions, religious disputes, and competition over resources. In its modern history, two civil wars between the central government and the southern regions killed 1.5 million people, and a continuing conflict in the western region of Darfur has displaced two million people and killed more than 200,000 people. Since independence in 1956, Sudan has had more than fifteen military coups and it has also been ruled by the military for the majority of the republic's existence, with only brief periods of democratic civilian parliamentary rule.

=== Before the War ===
Nyala was one of the largest havens for internally displaced persons (IDPs) in Darfur during the War in Darfur, and was also greatly targeted by warring armies. This has caused Nyala to be a city with an excessive number of wars and battles between the last few decades.

== Timeline ==
=== First Battle of Nyala (April 15–20) ===
Conflict began early in the morning of April 15. Due to the outbreak of fighting, all markets and schools in Nyala were closed, and civilians were urged to stay in their homes. The Nyala hospital stated that six civilians were killed early on in the clashes. Most clashes took place inside the city, and an attack on the al-Malja market killed three people. The SAF also claimed to repel an attack by RSF on Nyala International Airport and the Sudanese army regional command bases next to it. At least eleven people were killed in Nyala and Khartoum, and over sixteen injured, in Nyala on the first day of fighting. Other local monitors claimed 22 people were killed on just the first day.

By April 16, Nyala recorded the most fatalities in the fighting, and clashes took place at the SAF bases and near the Nyala hospital. The RSF took control of the Nyala Airport on April 16, after a 90-minute long attack pushed Sudanese forces to the eastern neighborhoods of the city. In battles in Kabkabiya, three World Food Programme aid workers were killed, prompting the organization to suspend all activities in Darfur, including Nyala. Little was known about the continued attacks on April 16 or the civilian death toll, due to fog of war.

Several UN agency offices were looted in Nyala by the RSF, including the WFP, UNHCR, and UNICEF. Médecins Sans Frontières reported that they could no longer conduct relief activities in the city, as their offices in Nyala had been looted. The RSF also captured the South Darfur Ministry of Finance that day, and clashes between army forces and the RSF in the neighborhoods of El Wadi, El Geer, and El Sereif caused civilians to flee. The El-Salam refugee camp, adjacent to Nyala, was also cut off from supplies due to the fighting. The RSF also consolidated control over the headquarters of the Sudanese Army's 7th Regiment.

By April 18, fighting had simmered down partially, and unknown gunmen on rickshaws allegedly affiliated with the RSF patrolled the city, ransacking NGOs and looting businesses. Theft took place at the Nyala Crops Exchange and police headquarters, in the industrial zone of the city. In the evening of April 18, the Nyala Central Hospital ceased operations due to a lack of power. Injured patients were brought to the Nyala Teaching Hospital and the Sudanese-Turkish hospital, the other two operating hospitals in the city. Other medical associations, including MSF, halted operations due to an inability to reach civilians through the fighting. Most fighting continued to take place near Nyala International Airport and the Sudanese Army's 16th Division command next to it.

Further reports of the RSF-aligned gunmen emerged in Nyala on April 19, as violence settled further. Around this time, the Sudanese Army controlled the 16th Division's military base, and the RSF controlled the airport, with a resident stating they "have 50-50 percent control of the area." The day was relatively quiet in the city, although at night, protests by civilians occurred in neighborhoods against both the RSF and SAF.

On April 20, a civilian-brokered ceasefire halted fighting between the RSF and SAF. The Nyala Central Hospital also began operations again, as electricity made its way back to the city. Some fighting continued in the north of the city later in the day, and civilian barricades were not taken down. By April 20, RSF forces were in El Matar, El Riyadh, and El Malja neighborhoods close to the airport. The RSF were also in control of the South Darfur intelligence services and Nyala Police Headquarters, on the eastern side of the city. The SAF were in control of many armories, ministries, and the army headquarters.

=== Ceasefire in effect (April 21–May 5) ===
The ceasefire continued to hold through May. The Turkish hospital in Nyala announced that the area around the hospital had slowed down fighting and that most hospitals are able to return to work. The Ministry of Education in the city was burned down on April 21, despite the truce. Eight bodies were collected by civilians in the days following the battle in areas that were unable to reach due to fighting. The market also returned, although prices were high. Meanwhile, inmates at the Nyala prison were released due to a lack of food and sufficient goods to hold them. The provisional death toll of the battle saw over 60 civilians killed, and 279 injured.

Clashes broke out a second time in Nyala on May 6, after RSF militants attempted to loot warehouses in the SAF-controlled al-Nahba neighborhood. The fighting then spread to two more neighborhoods. By May 7, Al Jazeera reported that Sudanese forces had pushed the RSF out of Nyala. Afterwards, theft skyrocketed in the city, and many markets closed down.

=== Sporadic clashes (May 18–August 8) ===
On May 15, 80 leaders of South Darfuri tribes signed a document urging the RSF and SAF to cease fighting. However, clashes reignited on May 18 at the Nyala Central Bank after disgruntled RSF soldiers fought with SAF troops receiving their paychecks. The day prior, Abdel Fattah al-Burhan's derecognition of the RSF prevented RSF soldiers from receiving government paychecks. On May 21, twenty-four girls, some as young as 14, were raped by RSF militants in the city's Aldaman hotel. Some of the girls were able to escape. In battles on May 19, RSF militants stormed and looted NGO offices, while civilians barricaded and dug ditches around their neighborhoods to prevent RSF attacks.

On May 20, the village of Abu Adam, near Nyala, was torched by alleged RSF militants, shown by satellite footage in late May. Numerous markets were also set ablaze in the city, with residents stating water pumps were out of service as well. Clashes broke out in Nyala again on May 23, with 28 people killed between May 20 and May 23 in the city. Several days later, more bodies were discovered in the Nyala market. At the time, Nyala had a shaky internet connection due to RSF attacks on Sudatel towers on the outskirts of the city. Local activists claimed 600,000 refugees were without aid in the city.

On May 29, a teacher who fled El Wadi neighborhood in Nyala stated that shelling continued on the outskirts of the city, with the SAF controlling the interior and the bridge. The teacher also said many internally displaced civilians fled to the southern parts of the city, particularly the Karari technical school. Sporadic clashes resumed on June 14, in the main market after unknown gunmen robbed shops. In the fighting, Osman Hamed, the financial director for northern Nyala, was killed. On June 25, even heavier fighting began, killing twenty-one civilians. In Otash refugee camp, nine people were injured. The Nyala museum was struck by artillery as well, with experts worrying the interior was vulnerable to damage. Between July 22 and 26, thirty people were killed in battles.

=== August offensive ===
Afterwards, it was calm until August 9, when two people were killed in a resurgence of fighting, and over 100 injured. By August 12, locals noted the heavy increase in firepower and shelling, saying "rockets were raining on houses". That day, RSF-allied militias fired at cattle keepers of the Daju ethnic group in the village of Kokoja, killing ten, seriously injuring others and causing civilian displacements, after villagers refused to give up their livestock to the militiamen. By August 14, just five days into clashes, the El Wahda hospital reported thirty cases of gunshot wounds, and the RSF reported 43 civilian casualties. Artillery predominantly hit Karari neighborhood, West Valley neighborhood, and Texas neighborhood, all near the command of the 16th Infantry Division. OCHA reported that since the battle of Nyala began on April 15, 20,000 people have fled the city. The IOM stated 4,000 households had become refugees since clashes began in August. The State Department released a statement deploring the surge in violence. On August 16, three people were killed by artillery during a Quran recitation ceremony in Otash camp. RSF militants also mobilized in the Nyala Grand Market, closing it off to civilians. By August 18, the heaviest fighting was concentrated in Karari, El Wadi, and Texas neighborhoods. Residents also stated that "Central Nyala is like a ghost town."

On August 21, the commander of the Sudanese Army's 16th Division, Yasser Fadlallah, was assassinated by a fifth column within the 16th Division, as the page of the SAF stated he was assassinated by the hands of Treachery and betrayal on a post in Facebook. Sources speaking to AlHadath stated Fadlallah dug his own grave at the base as a sign of his willingness to die for victory over the RSF, before he was assassinated. That same day, ReliefWeb reported that 50,000 refugees had fled, and 60 civilians killed with 250 injured since the resurgence in clashes. In response, aid convoys from Ed Daein made their way to Nyala.

=== Taiba bridge massacre ===
Taiba bridge massacre
- Part of Battle of Nyala of the War in Sudan (2023)
- Location: Taiba bridge, Nyala, South Darfur, Sudan
- Date: August 23, 2023
- Victims: 42 killed, 50 injured
- Perpetrator: Unknown

Forty-two people, mainly women and children, were killed in an airstrike on August 23, while they were sheltering under Taiba bridge as most exits and entrances to the city were blocked off. Five families were killed, and many others lost 3-4 members each. Many of the killed were from the Taiba and El Sikka Hadid neighborhoods, the former having recently been captured by the RSF. The airstrike was the largest single-day death toll of the battle of Nyala. Nyala-based journalist Ahmed Gouja stated that the Taiba bridge massacre was not the only one in the city during the renewed fighting, but that the others were impossible to reach or get information about due to the clashes. The RSF accused the SAF of indiscriminately shelling the RSF-controlled Taiba neighborhood, and having perpetrated the Taiba bridge massacre. The Sudanese Army did not make a statement on the airstrike.

That same day, convoys from the Joint Darfur Force reached Nyala to deliver aid to civilians, with the commander, Lt. Col. Hussein Yaqoub stating the force was strictly neutral. The Sudanese Communist Party decried the arrival of the JDF, claiming they only showed up after the carnage happened. Médecins Sans Frontières stated that all of their staff in Nyala were unable to leave, and were subject to their homes being stormed by fighters and civilians used as human shields. By early September, the el-Texas, el-Karari, and the southern parts of the city were the fiercest battlegrounds, with residents stating that much of Nyala was a ghost town due to indiscriminate shelling and RSF intrusions into civilian homes. Cell phone service was restored on September 11.

=== September 2023 Nyala airstrike ===
September 2023 Nyala airstrike
- Part of Battle of Nyala of the War in Sudan (2023)
- Location: El Malja market and several neighborhoods, Nyala, South Darfur, Sudan
- Date: September 13, 2023
- Victims: 40+ killed
- Perpetrator: Sudanese Armed Forces

On September 13, airstrikes by the SAF against two markets in Nyala killed another 40 people, the most killed since their airstrikes on the city beginning on September 3, The airstrike took place in El Matar and Texas neighborhoods. Many houses and shops were destroyed, and by September 14, many bodies were left under the rubble. The main market hit was El Malja market.

=== Siege of the 16th Infantry Division (September 23–October 26) ===
Clashes renewed in Nyala on September 22, with internet connectivity dropping amid reports of a siege on the city imposed by the RSF. By September 25, the clashes continued as the SAF repelled large RSF attacks. One person was killed in Otash refugee camp in the clashes on the 25th, bringing the total number of civilian casualties in the camp to 29 killed and 45 injured since the war broke out. Abdelrahim Dagalo, the brother of RSF leader Hemedti, was in Nyala commanding RSF forces in and around the city in late September.

In early October, soldiers at the 16th Infantry Division claimed to repel a massive RSF attack on the base, leaving the latter with significant casualties. In further bombing campaigns on the base, the neighborhoods of El Jir and El Nahda were damaged. Many of southern Nyala's residents moved to northern neighborhoods like Texas, Karari, and Taiba, as the RSF's siege tightened.

The RSF launched a major offensive on October 23 and 24, capturing the SAF military hospital, SAF fuel depot, and Nyala television center, fully surrounding the 16th Infantry Division's headquarters. In the attack, civilians stated they buried 32 bodies. The neighborhoods surrounding the 16th Infantry Division were deserted. On October 26, the RSF captured and stormed the headquarters of the 16th Infantry Division, the last main holdout of the SAF. The capture effectively solidified RSF control over all of Nyala. Videos surfacing from the aftermath of the capture showed dozens of bodies of slain SAF soldiers along the base. The RSF claimed that in the offensive, 2,000 SAF soldiers were killed.

== Aftermath ==
Following the capture of Nyala, videos emerged of RSF fighters killing members of the Sudan Liberation Army - Transitional Council (SLA-TC). Clashes also broke out between the RSF and Gathering of Sudan Liberation Forces led by al-Tahir Hajar on October 26, with the organization claiming 15 fighters had been killed in the clashes in Nyala.

Abdelrahim Dagalo, after the capture of the city, claimed that the RSF would attempt to stop disputes within the remaining SAF soldiers. Many SAF fighters defected to the RSF - at least 60 - following negotiations with Dagalo and Misseriya representatives. However, the SAF commander at the time of the fall, Hussein Mohamed Jawdat, did not negotiate.

== See also ==
- List of massacres in Sudan
