= Libya–Sudan border =

International border

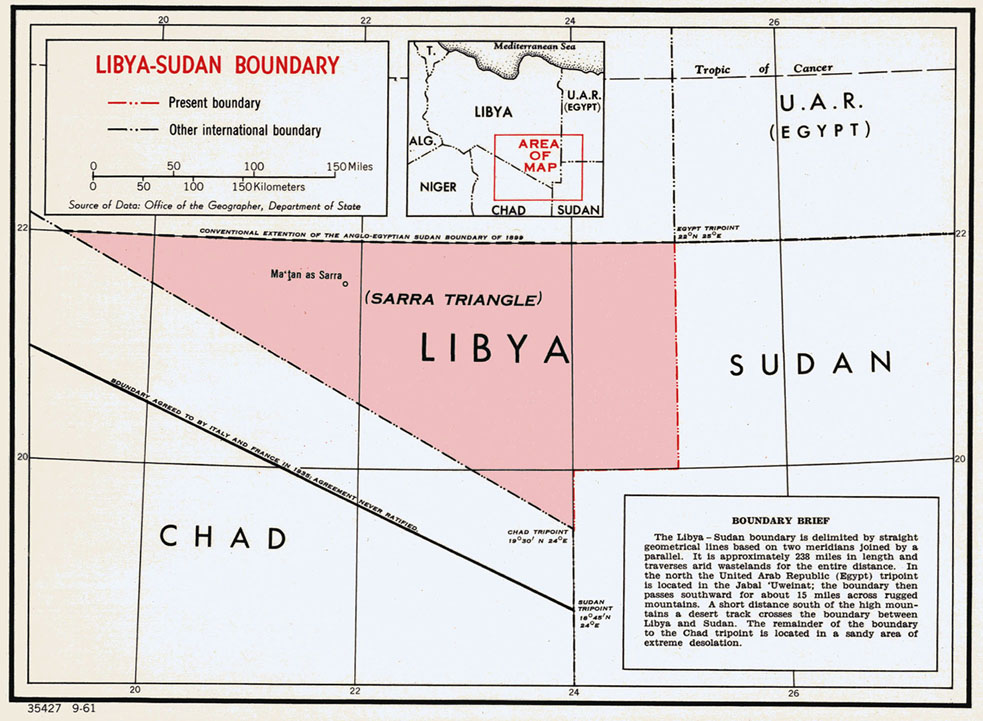
Map of Libya-Sudan border

The Libya–Sudan border is 382 km (237 mi) in length and runs from the tripoint with Egypt in the north to the tripoint with Chad in the south.

== Description ==
The border starts in the north at the tripoint with Egypt on Gabal El Uweinat, proceeding south along the 25th meridian east for 223 km (138 mi) down to the 20th parallel north. It then turns west along this parallel for 105 km (65 mi), before turning south at the 24th meridian east, where it turns south, running for 56 km (35 mi) down to the tripoint with Chad. The entire border runs through a remote, scarcely inhabited section of the Sahara desert.

== History ==
Britain invaded Egypt in 1882, establishing a protectorate over an area that had hitherto being nominally subject to the Ottoman Empire. In the 1890s the British conquered Sudan, and in 1899 a condominium was established which created Anglo-Egyptian Sudan. In September 1911 Italy invaded the nominally-Ottoman Vilayet of Tripolitania, and the Treaty of Ouchy was signed the following year by which the Ottomans formally ceded sovereignty of the area over to Italy. Italy organised the newly conquered regions into the colonies of Italian Cyrenaica and Italian Tripolitania and gradually began pushing further south; in 1934 they united the two territories as Italian Libya.

In 1925 Britain and Italy signed a boundary treaty, whereby the 22nd parallel north was utilised starting at the tripoint with Egypt and proceeding westward, terminating at the border between Italian Libyan and French Equatorial Africa (i.e. the modern Chad-Libya border). The north-west corner of Anglo-Sudan Egyptian thus created was referred to as the Sarra Triangle; this latter area was ceded to Italy on 20 July 1934, and the boundary re-drawn at its current position. On 7 January 1935 France and Italy signed a treaty which shifted the French Equatorial Africa-Libya boundary southwards (creating the Aouzou Strip, thereby also shifting the Libya-Sudan southwards slightly, however this agreement was never formally ratified by both parties and was thus never implemented.

During the North African Campaign of the Second World War Italy was defeated and its African colonies were occupied by the Allied powers, with Libya split into British and French zones of occupation. Libya was later granted full independence on 2 December 1951, followed by Sudan in 1956.

== See also ==
- Libya–Sudan relations
