= Darfur Joint Protection Force =

Peacekeeping force in Sudan

- قوة الحماية المشتركة في دارفور
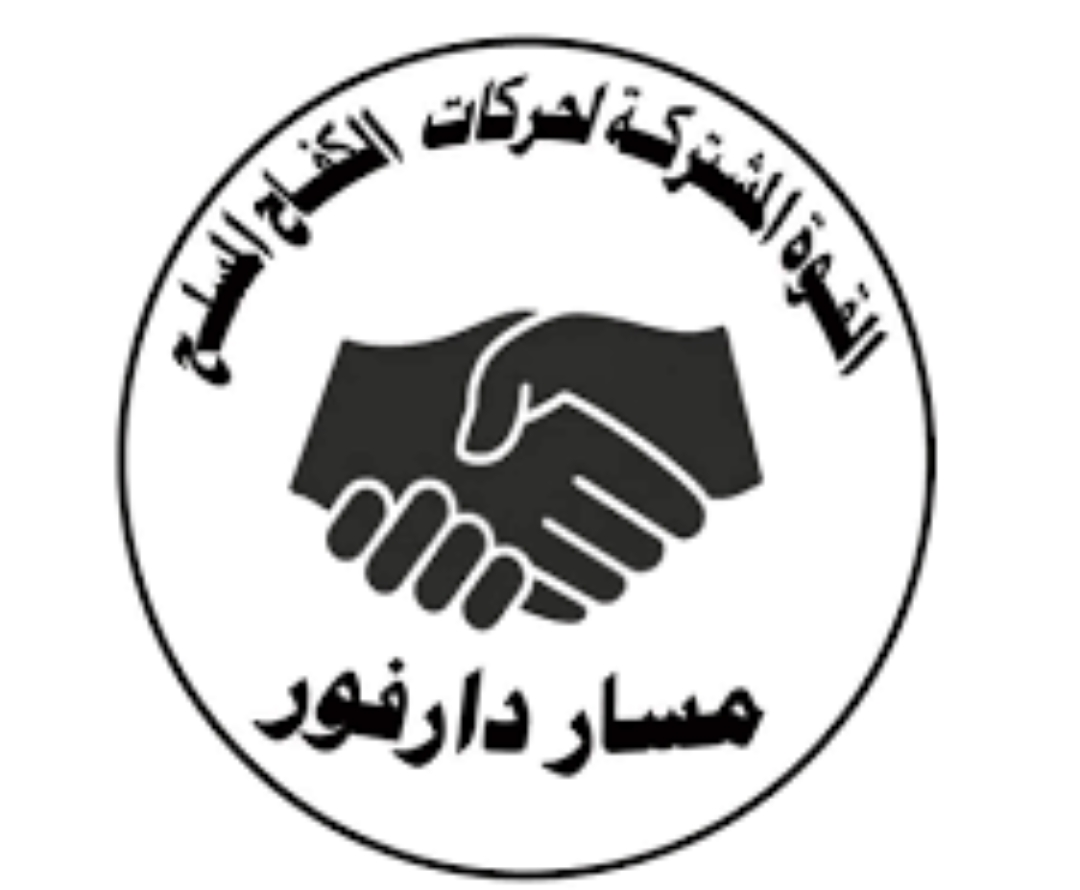
- Leader: Minni Minnawi
- Founded: 27 April 2023
- Dates active: 27 April 2023–present
- Country: Sudan
- Active regions: Darfur
- Website: https://x.com/Jsamfdarfur

The Darfur Joint Protection Force (Arabic: قوة الحماية المشتركة في دارفور, romanized: Qūwat al-Ḥimāyah al-Mushtarakah fī Dārfūr), or more simply the Joint Darfur Force/Joint Force, is a formerly defensive force that was set up during the Siege of El Fasher claiming to neutrally protect civilians during the ongoing war in Sudan by peacekeeping. It was formed on 27 April 2023 by four former rebel groups and signatories of the Juba peace agreement. The participating groups are SLM-Minawi, the Justice and Equality Movement, the Sudanese Alliance, and the Gathering of Sudan Liberation Forces. It is currently led by Darfur Region Governor Minni Minnawi.

The Joint Force has been criticised for its incompetence in ensuring the safety of civilians across Darfur. According to Major Ahmed Hussein Mustafa, the head of the media committee for the joint force, the force's limited capabilities and logistical support have prevented it from deploying forces across Darfur. The force has also been accused of not showing up on time after residents had been killed or not even showing up at all.

As of 29 August, the Joint Force controls the roads linking North and West Kordofan with Darfur.

== History ==
On 8 May 2023, Minni Minawi ordered the joint force to withdraw from northern Omdurman and relocate to North Darfur after failing to mediate a peace between the army and the Rapid Support Force (RSF).

On 23 May 2023, the RSF ambushed a convoy of the Joint Force in West Darfur, killing four.

On 28 May 2023, Minawi called on people in Darfur to take up arms for self-defence.

On 27 August, military reinforcements belonging to the Joint Force arrived in Nyala to deliver aid to civilians amid clashes between the army and the RSF. The Sudanese Communist Party decried the arrival of the Joint Force, claiming they only showed up after the carnage happened. At the same time Minawi left El Fasher to meet with federal government officials, humanitarian organisations, and political forces in Port Sudan "to discuss with officials and donors the catastrophic humanitarian situation in the region and in Sudan, how humanitarian aid can reach the displaced, and ways to get out of this crisis."

In later September rumours circulated that the RSF would attack a joint force convoy of lorries carrying humanitarian aid to El Fasher from Port Sudan. Allegedly, the convoy contained not only humanitarian aid but also military equipment for the Sixth Infantry Division in El Fasher. The RSF had moved some of its force to the city's entrance, so it was feared that they would attack the convoy.

=== Split ===
On 16 November 2023, SLM-Minawi and the Justice and Equality Movement jointly announced that they abandoned their neutrality and entered active involvement in military operations alongside the Sudanese army against the RSF. According to them they only took a position of neutrality at the beginning of the war in order to mediate between the parties, but now they believe the RSF is only seeking to "fragment and divide the country in partnership with foreign militias and mercenaries."

The next day, the Sudan Liberation Movement-Transitional Council, the Gathering of Sudan Liberation Forces, and the Sudanese Alliance jointly reaffirmed their commitment to neutrality, stating that they were "taken aback" by the press conference held in the name of the Darfur groups. The groups also stated that they would continue to work together to protect civilians and ensure the fulfilment of the essential needs of the people of Darfur.

This decision marked the end of a unified position among the peace signatories regarding the conflict between the army and the RSF, which was the cornerstone on which the joint force to protect civilians in Darfur was built.
