= Government of Peace and Unity =

Parallel government in Sudan

Government of Peace and Unity حكومة السلام والوحدة Ḥukūmat as-Salām wal-Waḥda
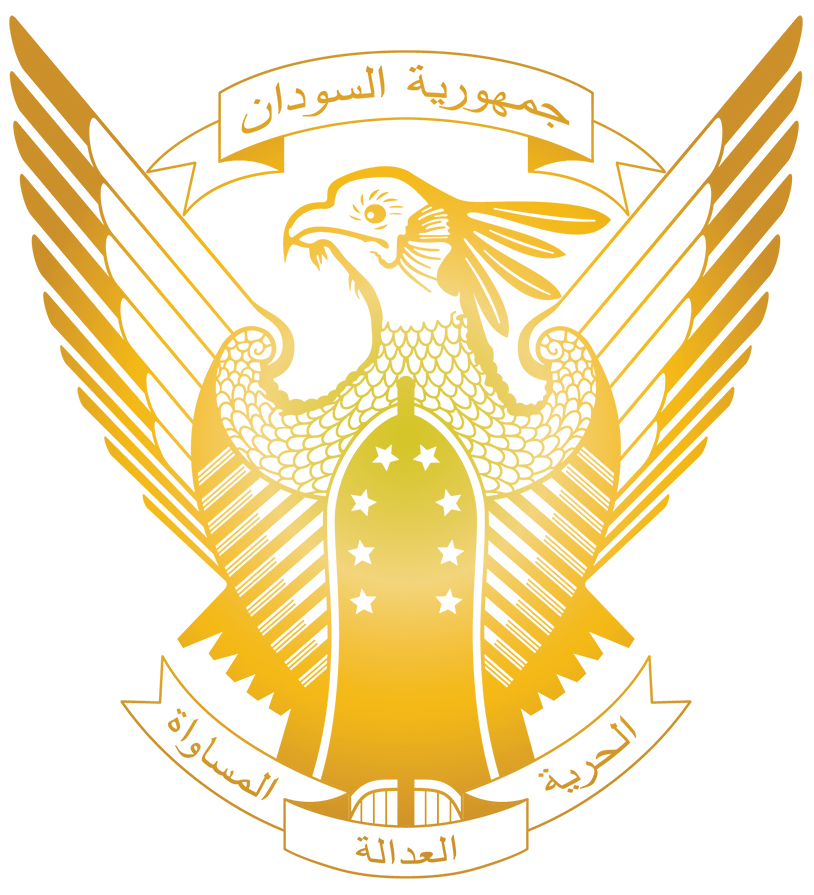
- Flag Coat of arms
- Motto: الحرية، العدالة، المساواة al-Ḥurriyyah, al-ʿAdālah, al-Musāwāh "Freedom, Justice, Equality"
- Territory controlled by the RSF shown in teal, by the SPLM-North (al Hilu) in yellow and jointly by both groups in orange. Territory controlled by the Sudan’s internationally recognised government shown in pink.

- Territory controlled by the RSF shown in yellow.
- Status: Unrecognized rival government and quasi-state
- Capital: Nyala (Note: El Fasher controlled areas in the beginning.)
- Demonym: Sudanese
- President of the Presidium of the Presidential Council
  - Since 2025: Mohamed Hamdan Dagalo
- Vice-President of the Presidium of the Presidential Council
  - Since 2025: Abdelaziz al-Hilu
- Transitional Prime Minister of the Transitional Cabinet
  - Since 2025: Mohammed Hassan al-Ta'ishi
- Establishment: Sudanese civil war (2023–present)
- History
  - Formation of the Government of Peace and Unity: 15 April 2025
- Time zone: UTC+02 (CAT)
- ISO 3166 code: SD

The Government of Peace and Unity (Arabic: حكومة السلام والوحدة, romanized: Ḥukūmat as-Salām wal-Waḥda) is a rival government and quasi-state established in April 2025 to administer areas of Sudan controlled by the Rapid Support Forces (RSF) and allied groups during the Sudanese Civil War, in opposition to the internationally recognised government appointed by the Transitional Sovereignty Council. The Government of Peace and Unity is headed by the leader of RSF Mohamed Hamdan Dagalo, known by the nom de guerre "Hemedti".

== Background ==
Sudanese president Omar al-Bashir was overthrown in a coup d'état in April 2019 following large-scale protests. A 39-month transition to democracy was planned, with the role of head of state being performed by a Transitional Sovereignty Council, and a transitional government led by Abdalla Hamdok was formed to govern the country until elections planned for July 2023. The transition period ended abruptly when the transitional government was dissolved following a further coup d'état, led by Abdel Fattah al-Burhan, in October 2021. A civil war between the al-Burhan led Sudanese Armed Forces (SAF) and the paramilitary Rapid Support Forces (RSF) led by "Hemedti" broke out in April 2023.

Initially, the RSF gained control of most of the capital, Khartoum and parts of Southern and Western Sudan. However, by early 2025, the SAF had regained ground around Khartoum and by mid-February 2025, had control over about two-thirds of the Khartoum metropolitan area.

== Establishment ==
The Chairman of the Transitional Sovereignty Council, Abdel Fattah al-Burhan, announced plans to form a civilian-led transitional government on 10 February 2025. In response, the RSF convened a conference in Nairobi, Kenya, on 18 February 2025 to draft a Sudan Founding Charter leading to the formation of a Sudan Founding Alliance. On 4 March 2025, the Sudan Founding Alliance announced that it had adopted a transitional constitutional framework to pave the way for forming a rival Government of Peace and Unity to administer territory under the control of the RSF and allied groups.

Consultations on the make-up of the proposed government began on 23 February 2025 in Nairobi, Kenya. However, on 24 February 2025, disagreements emerged between members of the Sudan Founding Alliance over allocating positions within the proposed government. On 8 March 2025, the RSF announced that arrangements to form the Government of Peace and Unity were complete and plans to issue passports, official documents, and currency were being prepared.

On 25 March 2025, it was reported that the Rapid Support Forces would gain the chairmanship of the presidential council and at least 40% of positions on the transitional cabinet, the Sudan People's Liberation Movement–North (al Hilu) would gain the vice-chairmanship of the presidential council and 30% of positions on the transitional cabinet with the remainder shared between the other members of the Sudan Founding Alliance. On 28 March 2025, it was announced that the commander of the Rapid Support Forces, Hemedti, was nominated to be the chairman of the Presidential Council in the future government. Along with this announcement, it was announced that negotiations are nearing their close and the government would likely be formed shortly after Eid al-Fitr. On 14 April 2025, Sudan's foreign minister, Ali Youssef al-Sharif, said he expected the GPU to be established that week.

Rapid Support Forces leader Mohamed Hamdan Dagalo officially announced the establishment of the Government of Peace and Unity on 15 April 2025. The following day, Dagalo stated that the GPU would begin issuing its identity cards and currency. On 25 July 2025, it was reported that the headquarters of the GPU would be based in Nyala, with some institutions also operating from Geneina and Ed Daein.

== Territorial control ==
In November 2025, the Government of Peace and Unity controlled the states of Central Darfur, East Darfur, South Darfur and West Darfur in their entirety. It also controlled most of North Darfur, and West Kordofan, and parts of North Kordofan, and South Kordofan.

== Monetary policy ==
In the areas controlled by the Government of Peace and Unity a parallel monetary system have emerged with old currency retaining its value. When the Sudanese government started printing new 500 and 1,000-pound notes in November 2024, the rival government reacted by banning the usage of new banknotes in May 2026. While in Khartoum one dollar was selling for more than 9,000 Sudanese pounds, in Nyala it sold for only 4,600 pounds. Due to severe cash shortage people in Western Sudan have been forced to use the Bankak app from the Sudanese government, leading to heavy transfer fees imposed by the Darfur traders, with the commission reaching 40% in East Darfur and 50% in West Darfur. Additionally the Central Bank of Sudan have often closed Bankak accounts linked to Rapid Support Forces increasing risks of trading in the areas.

For most of the war all banks stopped functioning in RSF-held areas, with their premises looted and destroyed. In January 2026 they launched a new bank, "El Mustaqbal Bank" (Future Bank), in Nyala to restore financial services. As of September 2026 it has expanded to West Darfur.

On 21 May 2026 the Government of Peace and Unity appointed Yahya Hussein Jangoul as a governor of a parallel central bank in Nyala. The group started printing new banknotes in late May bearing the signature of Jangoul and using them to pay salaries.

== Government structure ==
President of the Presidium of the Presidential Council
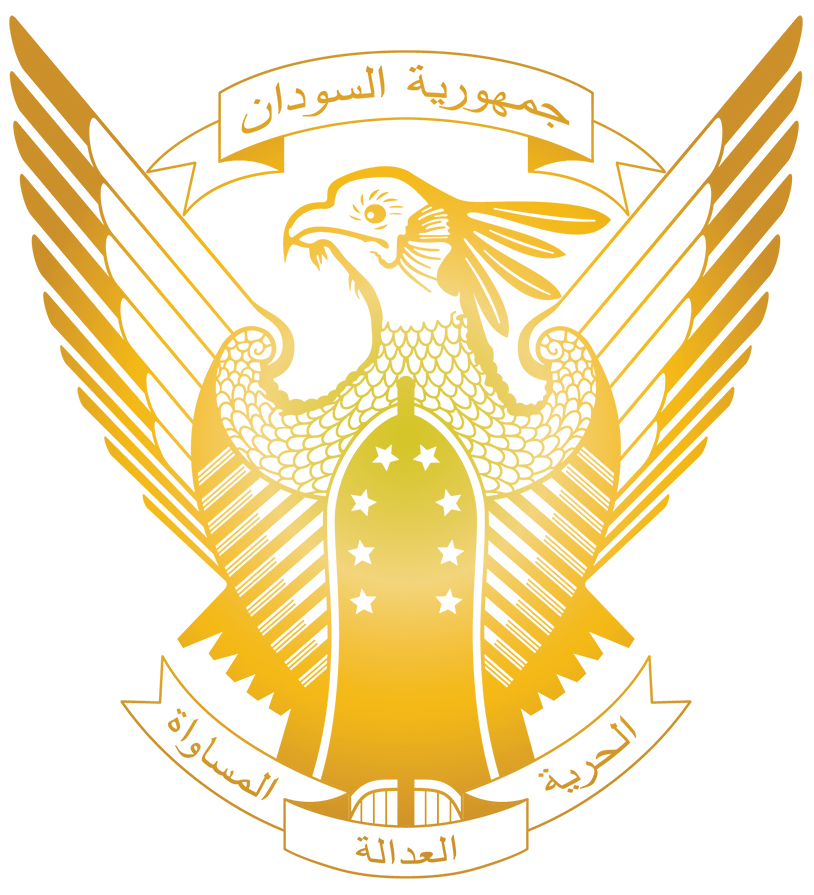
- Emblem of the GPU

- Flag of the GPU

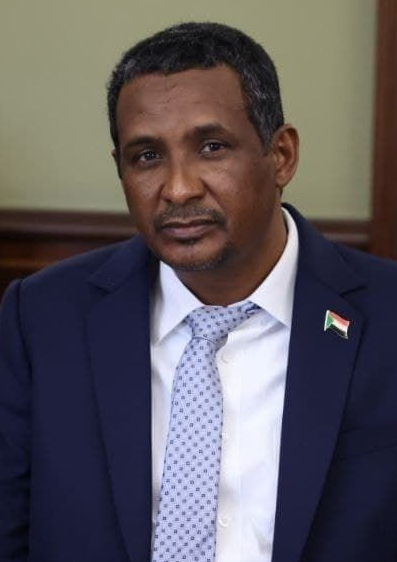
- Incumbent; Muhammad Hamdan Dagalo since 15 April 2025
- Type: Head of State
- Formation: April 15, 2025
- Unofficial names: Chairman of the Presidium of the Presidential Council
- Deputy: Vice-President of the Presidium of the Presidential Council

Vice-President of the Presidium of the Presidential Council
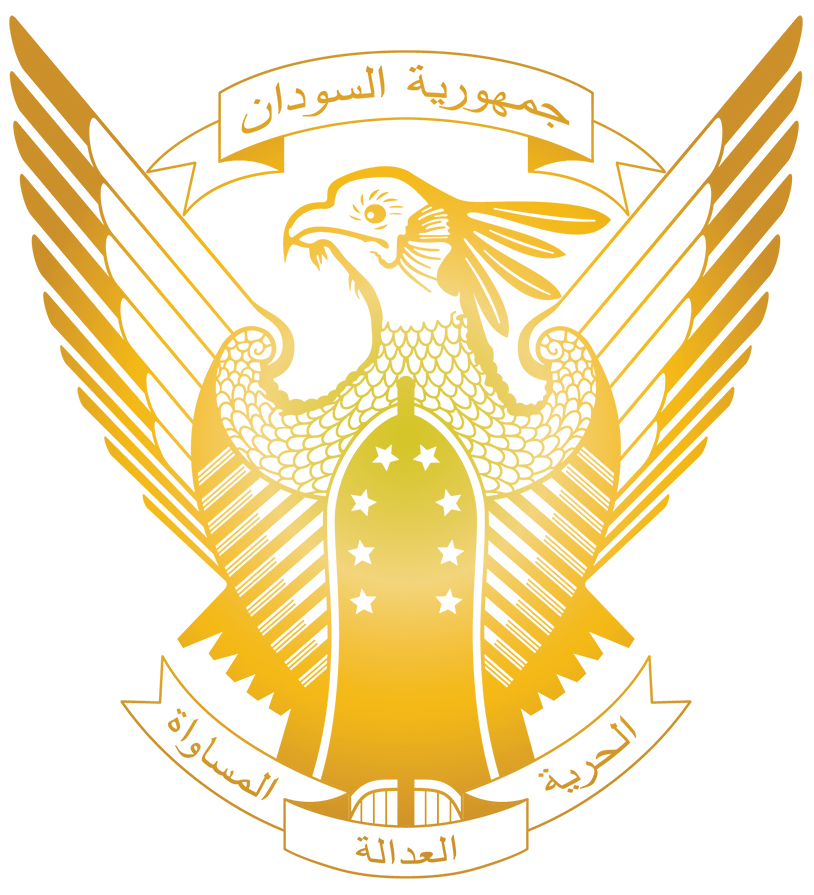
- Emblem of the GPU

- Flag of the GPU
- Incumbent; Abdelaziz al-Hilu since 26 July 2025
- Type: Vice to the President
- Formation: July 26, 2025
- Unofficial names: Vice-Chairman of the Presidium of the Presidential Council

Transitional Prime Minister of the Transitional Cabinet
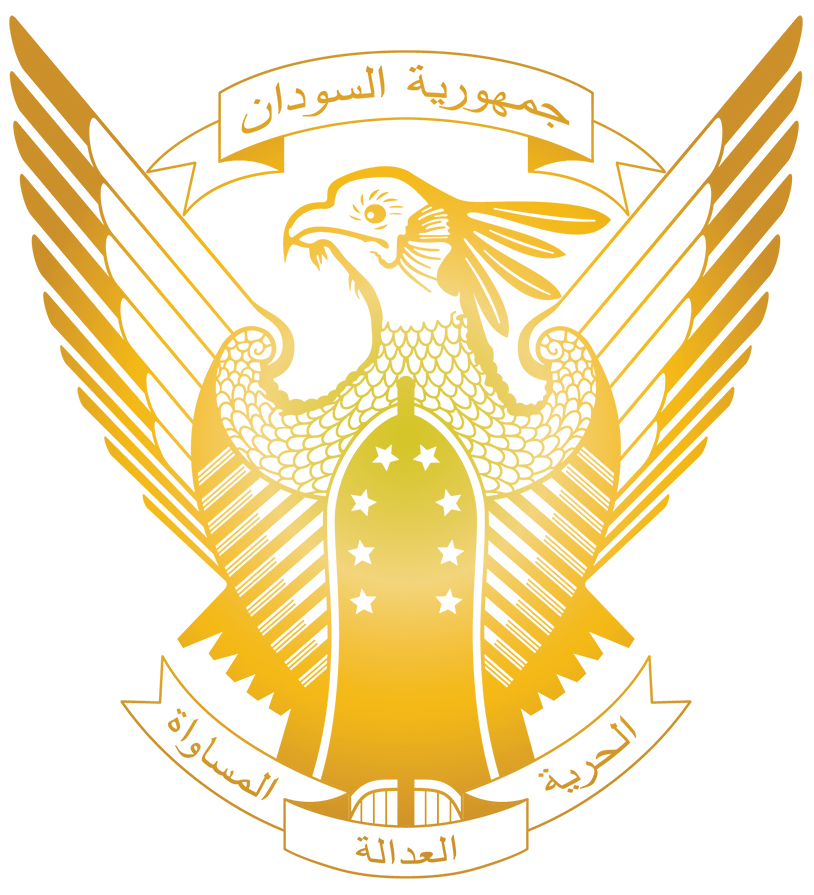
- Emblem of the GPU

- Flag of the GPU

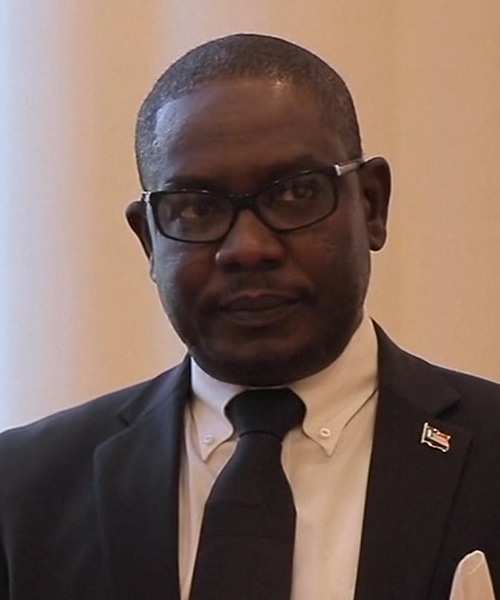
- Incumbent; Mohammed Hassan al-Ta'ishi since 26 July 2025
- Type: Head of Government
- Formation: July 26, 2025

The transitional constitutional framework adopted by the Sudan Founding Alliance on 4 March 2025 prescribed the Government of Peace and Unity structure. It contains provisions for dividing Sudan into eight administrative regions and defines the powers of national, regional and local authorities.

=== Presidential Council ===
The Presidential Council has 15 members, seven of whom are nominated by the Sudan Founding Alliance and eight regional governors who serve as ex officio members. The Rapid Support Forces leader, Mohamed Hamdan Dagalo, also known as "Hemedti", was named chairman of the presidential council on 28 March 2025. The president and vice-president constitute the presidium of the presidential council. The full membership of the presidential council was announced on 26 July 2025.

Members

- General President Mohamed Hamdan Dagalo ("Hemedti") – President of the Presidium of the Presidential Council
- Commander Abdelaziz al-Hilu – Vice-President of the Presidium of the Presidential Council
- Altahir Abubakr Hagar
- Mohamed Yousif Ahmed Almustafa
- Hamid Hamdeen al-Nuwain
- Abdalla Ibrahim Abbas
- Kholdi Fathi Salim Jumad
- Saleh Issa Abdullah
- El Hadi Idris Yahya
- Mabrouk Mubarak Salim
- Faris al-Nour Ibrahim
- Hamad Mohamed Hamid Khalifa
- Joseph Tuka Ali
- Abdulgasim al-Rasheed Ahmed al-Hassan
- Jagood Mukwar Marada

=== Transitional Cabinet ===
A Transitional Cabinet consists of a prime minister, nominated by the Sudan Founding Alliance, and up to 16 other ministers nominated by the prime minister in consultation with the signatories to the Sudan Founding Charter. Mohammed Hassan al-Ta'ishi was named prime minister on 26 July 2025.

Members

- Mohammed Hassan al-Ta'ishi – Transitional Prime Minister of the Transitional Cabinet of the Transitional Government of Peace and Unity
- Lieutenant General Abdul Rahim Dagalo – Defense
- Suleiman Sandal – Interior
- Ibrahim al-Mirghani – Information and cabinet affairs

=== Constituent Legislative Body ===
A bicameral Constituent Legislative Body comprises a 24-member Council of Regions and a 177-member Council of Deputies. The Speaker of the Legislative Council is currently Fadlallah Burma.

=== Judiciary ===
On 1 April 2026, Hemedti issued a decree to establish the Interim Council of Justice to prepare for the selection of the Chief Justice and the Attorney General, as well as the formation of the Constitutional Court.

=== Regions and states ===
The transitional constitutional framework contains provisions group the states of Sudan into eight Regions: Khartoum Region, Eastern Region, Northern Region, Darfur Region, Central Region, Kordofan Region, South Kordofan/Nuba Mountains Region, and New Funj Region. Eight regional governors were named on 26 July 2025, including for areas not controlled by the RSF and allied forces.

Regional governors

- Saleh Issa Abdullah – Central Region
- El Hadi Idris Yahya – Darfur Region
- Mabrouk Mubarak Salim – Eastern Region
- Faris al-Nour Ibrahim – Khartoum Region
- Hamad Mohamed Hamid Khalifa – Kordofan Region
- Joseph Tuka Ali – New Funj Region
- Abdulgasim al-Rasheed Ahmed al-Hassan – Northern Region
- Jagood Mukwar Marada – South Kordofan/Nuba Mountains Region

State administrators

State administrators were appointed for states in Darfur and Kordofan in November 2026:

- Musa al-Sheikh Taha Ahmed – South Darfur
- Adam Mohamed Adam Hamed al-Jadi – North Darfur
- Khalil Hamed Dagrasho Mohamed – West Darfur
- Othman Hamed Mohamed Mualla – East Darfur
- Amer Hamdan Ishaq Zakaria – Central Darfur
- Abu Obeida Bakhit Jagar Mohamed – West Kordofan

== Reactions ==
Sudan

- The foreign ministry of the Transitional Sovereignty Council described the proposed formation of a parallel government as an "act of hostility," adding that the move “promotes the dismembering of African states, violates their sovereignty, and interferes in their internal affairs. Sudan recalled its ambassador to Kenya on 20 February 2025. On 22 February 2025, Sudan’s foreign ministry stated that it was planning to impose a ban on Kenyan goods entering the country, which came into force on 14 March 2025. On 27 July 2025, the day after the GPU appointed its presidential council and cabinet, the Sudanese foreign ministry denounced the GPU as “fictitious,” labelled the RSF as a “terrorist militia,” and urged foreign governments and organisations to condemn the formation of a rival government.

Other states

- Algeria called the formation of a parallel government a "dangerous step that fuels further fragmentation and derails current efforts for peace and dialogue."
- China believes that creating a parallel government "risks increasing the fragmentation of the Sudan".
- Egypt’s foreign minister, Badr Abdelatty, criticized the RSF’s efforts to form a parallel government, stating that Egypt "rejects the establishment of any other framework or parallel government to the legitimate government in Sudan and rejects any external interference in Sudan."
- Guyana supported a statement during a meeting of the United Nations Security Council that urged the RSF to "put the unity and national interest of Sudan above all other considerations"
- Jordan's foreign ministry issued a statement "reject[ing] attempts that may threaten to undermine the unity of the sisterly Republic of Sudan, by calling for the formation of a parallel Sudanese government, which hinders efforts to solve the Sudanese crisis."
- Kenya defended its role in hosting the RSF led conference, with Prime Cabinet Secretary Musalia Mudavadi stating that "Kenya's actions were in line with its broader role in peace negotiations and its commitment to supporting Sudan in finding a resolution to its ongoing political crisis." On 8 April 2025, Mudavadi clarified that the RSF had not formally established a parallel government in Kenya in February. Mudavadi later stated that "Kenya supports a unified Sudan" and "advocates for a Sudanese-owned political process."
- Kuwait's foreign ministry rejected any actions taken outside Sudan’s official institutions, calling them interference and a threat to territorial integrity.
- Pakistan reaffirmed its commitment to Sudan’s unity, sovereignty, and territorial integrity and strongly condemned attempts to establish a parallel government in Sudan, warning that any move that violates the UN Charter will only deepen instability.
- Qatar stated that it supported the unity and sovereignty of Sudan and rejected any outside interference in its internal affairs.
- Russia called for the UN to support Sudan's peace process and warned against "parallel steps."
- Saudi Arabia's foreign ministry "rejected any illegitimate steps or measures taken outside the framework of the Republic of Sudan's official institutions."
- Sierra Leone supported a statement during a United Nations Security Council meeting that urged the RSF to "put the unity and national interest of Sudan above all other considerations."
- Somalia supported a statement during a United Nations Security Council meeting that urged the RSF to "put the unity and national interest of Sudan above all other considerations."
- South Korea highlighted a contradiction between the RSF’s stated aim of forming a peaceful, unified government and its actions on the ground at a United Nations Security Council meeting.
- (Uganda) Ugandan president Yoweri Museveni stated that he will not recognize any parallel government formed by the RSF.
- The United Kingdom expressed "deep concern" over the development during a meeting of the United Nations Security Council, where the British representative stated that "Respect for Sudan's charter rights, its unity, sovereignty and territorial integrity is vital and will be necessary for a sustainable end to this war."
- The United States ambassador to the United Nations added, "attempts by the RSF and aligned actors to establish a government in RSF-controlled territory in Sudan are unhelpful for the cause of peace and security in Sudan, and risk a de facto partition of the country."

International organisations

- The African Union Peace and Security Council expressed grave concern about the RSF's attempts to establish a parallel government, adding that it will not recognise any such government. It also urged member states not to recognise a parallel government proclaimed by the RSF. Following the announcement of the appointment of the GPU's in the presidential council and the prime minister in July 2025, the Peace and Security Council reiterated its recognition of the Transitional Sovereignty Council and the transitional civilian government as the two legitimate authorities in Sudan.
- The Arab League expressed "deep concern and strong disapproval of any actions that could undermine Sudan’s unity or lead to its division."
- The International Conference on the Great Lakes Region expressed serious concern about the RSF establishing a parallel governing authority in areas it controls. Following the announcement of the appointment of the GPU's in the presidential council and the prime minister in July 2025, the ICGLR issued a statement expressing "deep concern and condemnation" regarding the establishment of an alternative government by the RSF and rejected "unilateral action which poses challenges to Sudan's sovereignty and territorial integrity."
- A United Nations spokesperson stated that the Sudan crisis could worsen if paramilitaries declare a parallel government, adding that preserving the unity of Sudan, the sovereignty and the territorial integrity, remains a key ingredient for a sustainable resolution of the conflict.

== See also ==
- Territory of the Rapid Support Forces
- New Sudan
- Liberated Areas
- Politics of Sudan
- Government of Sudan
- Government-in-exile
- Rival government
- Quasi-state
