= North Darfur =

State of Sudan

North Darfur State ولاية شمال دارفور Shamal Darfor
- State
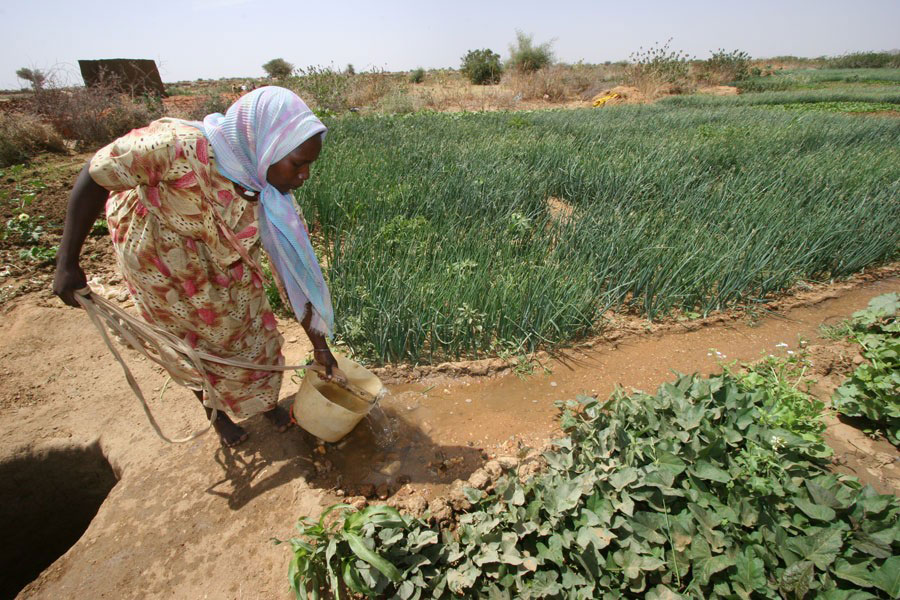
- Farmer irrigating crops in North Darfur

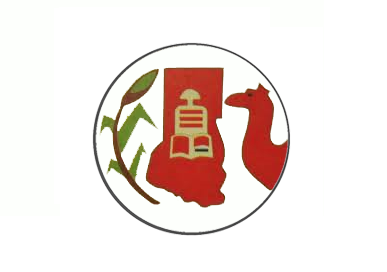
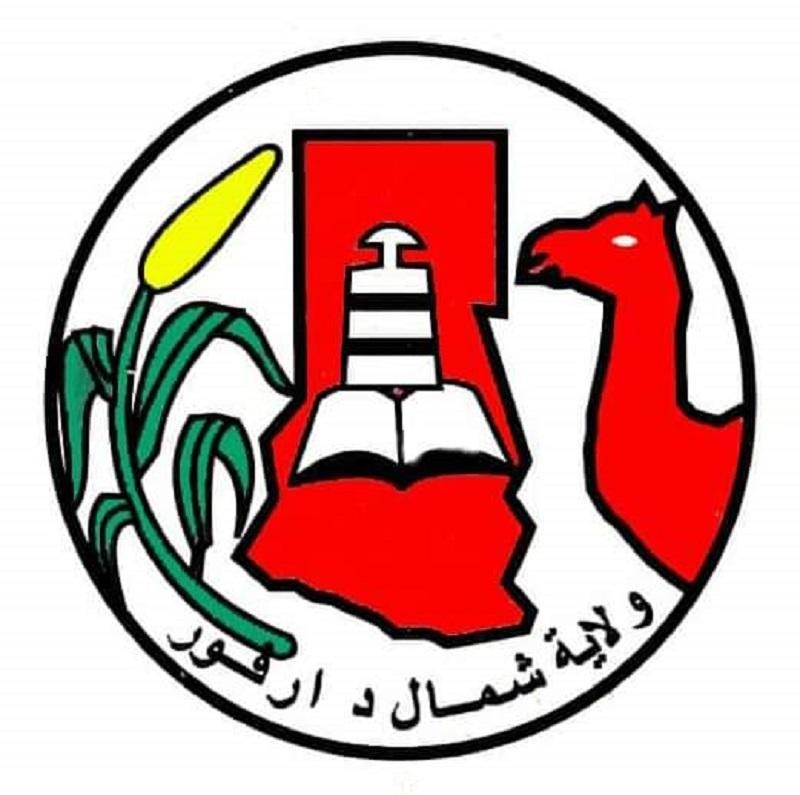
- Flag Seal

- Location in Sudan.
- Coordinates: 16°4′N 25°28′E
- Country: Sudan
- Region: Darfur
- Capital: Al-Fashir

Government
  - Governor: Al-Hafiz Bakhit Mohammed (acting)

Area
  - Total: 296,420 km^{2} (114,450 sq mi)

Population (2018)
  - Total: 2,304,950
  - Density: 5.34/km^{2} (13.8/sq mi)
- Time zone: UTC+2 (CAT)
- ISO 3166 code: SD-DN
- HDI (2017): 0.491 low

North Darfur State (Arabic: ولاية شمال دارفور Wilāyat Šamāl Dārfūr; Shamal Darfor) is one of the wilayat or states of Sudan. It is one of the five states composing the Darfur region. It borders Libya to the northwest, Chad and West Darfur to the west, the rest of the darfurs to the south, West Kordofan and North Kordofan to the east, and Northern to the northeast. It has an area of 296,420 km^{2} and an estimated population of approximately 2,304,950 in 2018. Al-Fashir is the capital of the state. Other significant towns include Ailliet, Kebkabiya, Kutum, Mellit (Malit), Tawila, Saraf Omra and Umm Keddada (Umm Kadadah).

== History ==
North Darfur shares much of the history of Darfur. It was the center of the Sultanate of Darfur and contained both its capital al-Fashir and its biggest trading city Kobbei.

Former lieutenant general, Armed Forces Chief of Staff, and defense minister Ibrahim Suleiman Hassan served as governor of North Darfur from April 2001 to May 2003, until being dismissed by President Omar al-Bashir.

North Darfur has been a major flashpoint during the ongoing civil war. Reports indicate that tens of thousands of people were killed in the El Fasher massacre in late October 2025, perpetrated by the Rapid Support Forces (RSF) after they captured Al-Fashir, the last Sudanese Armed Forces stronghold in Darfur.

== Geography ==
North Darfur occupies more than half of the territory of the Darfur region, and includes part of the Marrah Mountains (Jebel Marra). The northern part is entirely desert. To the south there is slightly more rainfall with the eastern side being plains with low sandy hills, while the volcanic Marrah Mountains occupy most of the western side of the south. In the southern portion the most important crops are millet, maize and peanuts.

North Darfur is bounded on the northwest by Libya, on the north by Northern State, on the east by Northern State and North Kurdufan, on the southeast by South Kurdufan, on the south by South Darfur, and on the west by West Darfur and the Republic of Chad. Most of North Darfur's population follow Sunni Islam.

== Governors ==
Name	Period	References
Ibrahim Suleiman Hassan	April 2001 – May 2003	
Osman Kebir	May 2003 – June 2015	
Abdel-Wahid Youssef	June 2015 – April/May 2018	
Al-Sharief Mohamed Abad	May 2018 – 22 February 2019	
Al Naeem Khidir Mursal	22 February 2019 – at least to March 2019	
Malik al-Tayeb Khojali	at least from May 2019 – Late July 2020	
Mohamed Hassan Arabi	at least from September 2020 – 13 June 2021	
Nimir Mohammed Abdelrahman	13 June 2021 – 1 January 2024	
Al-Hafiz Bakhit Mohammed (acting)	at least from February 2024-	
