= List of massacres in Sudan =

The following is a list of massacres that have occurred in Sudan in reverse chronological order:

== List ==
Name	Date	Deaths	Involved	Location – Circumstances
Ghara al-Zawiya drone attack	August 2, 2026	35	Sudanese Armed Forces	Ghara al-Zawiya, North Darfur – At least 35 people were killed by a drone attack on the village of Ghara al-Zawiya, which was controlled by the RSF. The attack occurred during a traditional court session in the village.
El-Daein hospital attack	March 20, 2026	64	Sudanese Armed Forces (suspected)	El Daein, East Darfur – At least 64 people, including 13 children, were killed and 89 others were injured by a suspected SAF drone strike at a hospital in El Daein, which was under RSF control. The SAF denied carrying out the attack, stating that the army adhered to "international norms and laws".
Dilling siege	December 18–19, 2025	16	RSF and Sudan People's Liberation Movement–North (SPLM–N)	Dilling, South Kordofan – At least 16 people including women, elderly residents and children were killed from artillery bombardment during a siege of the city by the RSF and the SPLM–N.
Kadugli attack	December 13, 2025	6	RSF (alleged)	Kadugli, South Kordofan – Six United Nations peacekeepers, all of them are Bangladeshi nationals, were killed and eight others were injured by a drone attack. The SAF blamed the attack on the RSF. UN secretary general António Guterres stated that the attack was "unjustified" and may constitute as a war crime.
Kalogi drone attacks	December 4, 2025	114–116	RSF	Kalogi, South Kordofan – The Sudan Doctors' Network accused the RSF of attacking a kindergarten and hospital in Kalogi, killing more than a hundred people, including between 46 and 63 children.
El Fasher massacre	October 26, 2025 – present	60,000+	RSF	El Fasher, North Darfur State
Al-Arqam Home drone attack	October 11, 2025	53+	RSF	El Fasher, North Darfur State – A drone attack by the RSF targeted a shelter for displaced families, killing 53 people including 14 children and 15 women while injuring 21 others.
El Fasher drone strike	September 19, 2025	78+	RSF	El Fasher, North Darfur State – The drone struck a mosque during morning prayers, killing at least 78 people and injuring 20 others.
Abu Shouk camp attack	August 11, 2025	40	RSF	El Fasher, North Darfur State – The RSF raided the camp, targeting civilians in their homes, killing 40 people and injuring 19 others.
El Obeid prison drone strike	May 10, 2025	21	RSF	El Obeid, North Kordofan – A drone strike by the RSF targeted a prison in El Obeid, killing 21 and injuring 47 others.
Al-Nahud massacre	May 2–3, 2025	300+	RSF	Al-Nahud, West Kordofan
Al-Salha massacre	April 27, 2025	31+	RSF	Al-Salha, Omdurman – The RSF accused the victims, including minors, of being affiliated with the Sudanese Armed Forces. The Sudan Doctors Network condemned the massacre as a "war crime and a crime against humanity”.
Zamzam and Abu Shouk refugee camp massacres	April 10-12, 2025	389+	RSF	North Darfur State – Hundreds of structures including residences, marketplaces, and medical facilities destroyed.
Tur'rah market massacre	March 25, 2025	61-270+	Sudanese Armed Forces	West Darfur – A military spokesperson denied attacking civilians, claiming that it only attacked "legitimate hostile" targets.
Al-Kadaris and Al-Khelwat massacres	February 15-17, 2025	200-433+	RSF	El Geteina, White Nile State
2025 Omdurman market attack	February 1, 2025	56	RSF	Khartoum State – The Sabrein open market was attacked, killing 54 people and injuring more than 158.
2025 Saudi Hospital Attack	January 24, 2025	70+	RSF	El Fasher, North Darfur State – An attack that killed at least 70 people and injured 19 others.
Kabkabiya market airstrike	December 9, 2024	100+	Sudanese Armed Forces	North Darfur State, Kabkabiya – An airstrike killed more than 100 people at a market.
Khartoum North mosque airstrike	December 6, 2024	7	Sudanese Armed Forces	Khartoum North, Khartoum State – An airstrike on a mosque by the Sudanese Armed Forces killing seven people.
2024 eastern Gezira State massacres	October 20, 2024	8,000+	RSF	Gezira State – Mass killing of civilians in at least thirty Sudanese villages.
Galgani massacre	August 15, 2024	108+, 24+ women and minors	RSF	Sennar State
Wad An Nora massacre	June 5, 2024	150-200+	RSF	Gezira State, Wad Al-Noora – The Rapid Support Forces (RSF) attacked the village of Wad Al-Noora in Al-Jazira state, killing at least 100 civilians
Ardamata massacre	November 8, 2023	800–2000	RSF, Janjaweed	West Darfur State; See also: Masalit genocide
Taiba bridge massacre	August 23, 2023	42	Undisclosed	South Darfur State
Geneina massacre	June 14–23, 2023	5,000+		West Darfur State; See also: Masalit genocide
Misterei massacre	May 27-28, 2023	97	RSF, Janjaweed	West Darfur State; See also: Masalit genocide
Kreinik massacre	April 21, 2022	200+ Kreinik 10 Geneina	RSF, Janjaweed	West Darfur State
Tangi and Bir Dagig massacres	April 9–10, 2022	12	Gunmen	West Darfur State
Krinding massacre	January 16, 2021	163	Janjaweed, Rapid Support Forces, and Mahameed Arab civilians	West Darfur State, El Geneina, Krinding IDP camp
2020 Darfur attacks	July 12–26, 2020	89+		North Darfur State, South Darfur State, West Darfur State
2019 June sit-in protest massacre	June 30, 2019	12		Khartoum State and Kassala State, Obaid, Khartoum, Omdurman and Kassala – 100+ Injured
El Obeid Massacre	July 29, 2019	8+	RSF	North Kordofan, El Obeid – six of the victims were children who were shot by the Rapid Support Forces Snipers. The children died through direct headshots and chest shots.
Khartoum massacre also known as Ramadan massacre	June 3, 2019	350+		Khartoum State, Khartoum – Witnesses say at least 650 killed
2019 May sit-in protest massacres	May 2019	168	RSF, NISS	Khartoum State, Wad Madani, Gedarif, Khartoum –: 10 May 2019 - ten killed in Wad Madani sit-in by Rapid Support Forces; 12 May 2019 - over 50 killed in Gedarif by NISS; 13 May 2019 - Rapid Forces killed over 100 civilians and injured hundreds in Khartoum sit-in; 13 May 2019 - 8 killed in the first General Command massacre sit-in by Rapid Support Forces
2008 Omdurman attack	May 10-12, 2008	220+	JEM	Khartoum State, Khartoum and Omdurman – Darfur rebel group Justice and Equality Movement raided Khartoum and Omdurman, killing over 220 people. It was the first time the Darfur conflict reached the capital, marking a significant escalation in a conflict that had already claimed up to 300,000 lives and displaced 2.5 million since 2003.
Darfur genocide	2003–2005	100,000–200,000	Al-Bashir regime Sudanese Armed Forces Janjaweed Muraheleen	
2000 Jarafa mosque massacre	December 9, 2000	23		Khartoum State, Omdurman – 31 injured
1992 jihad against Nuba peoples	1992–1993	100,000+	Sudanese government: National Islamic Front (NIF)	South Kordofan, Nuba Mountains region – In 1992, a jihad against the indigenous Nuba peoples was declared. In 1993, a fatwa was issued, declaring that Nuba Muslims were not considered true Muslims, therefore just as much a target as Christians and followers of traditional beliefs. Entire villages were destroyed, civilians killed, raped or kidnapped. See also: Sudanesischer Dschihad von 1992 (in German) and Bürgenstock Agreement
1991 Bor massacre	November 15, 1991	2000+	Nuer White Army and Nuer fighters from SPLA-Nasir	Today's South Sudan, Jonglei State, Bor See also: Second Sudanese Civil War
1990 Kaldada massacre	April 1990	60		
El Jebelein massacre	December 1989	200-1,500+		
1989 Angolo massacre	January–April 1989			
1987 Saburi massacre	March 1987	Nearly 100		
1987 Ed Daein massacre	March 27–28 1987	1,000+	Muraheleen (mainly Rizeigat militia)	East Darfur State, Ed Daein – Most of the victims were Dinka.
1965 Juba and Wau massacres	July 1965	3,000+		

== Gallery ==
Location of Sudan

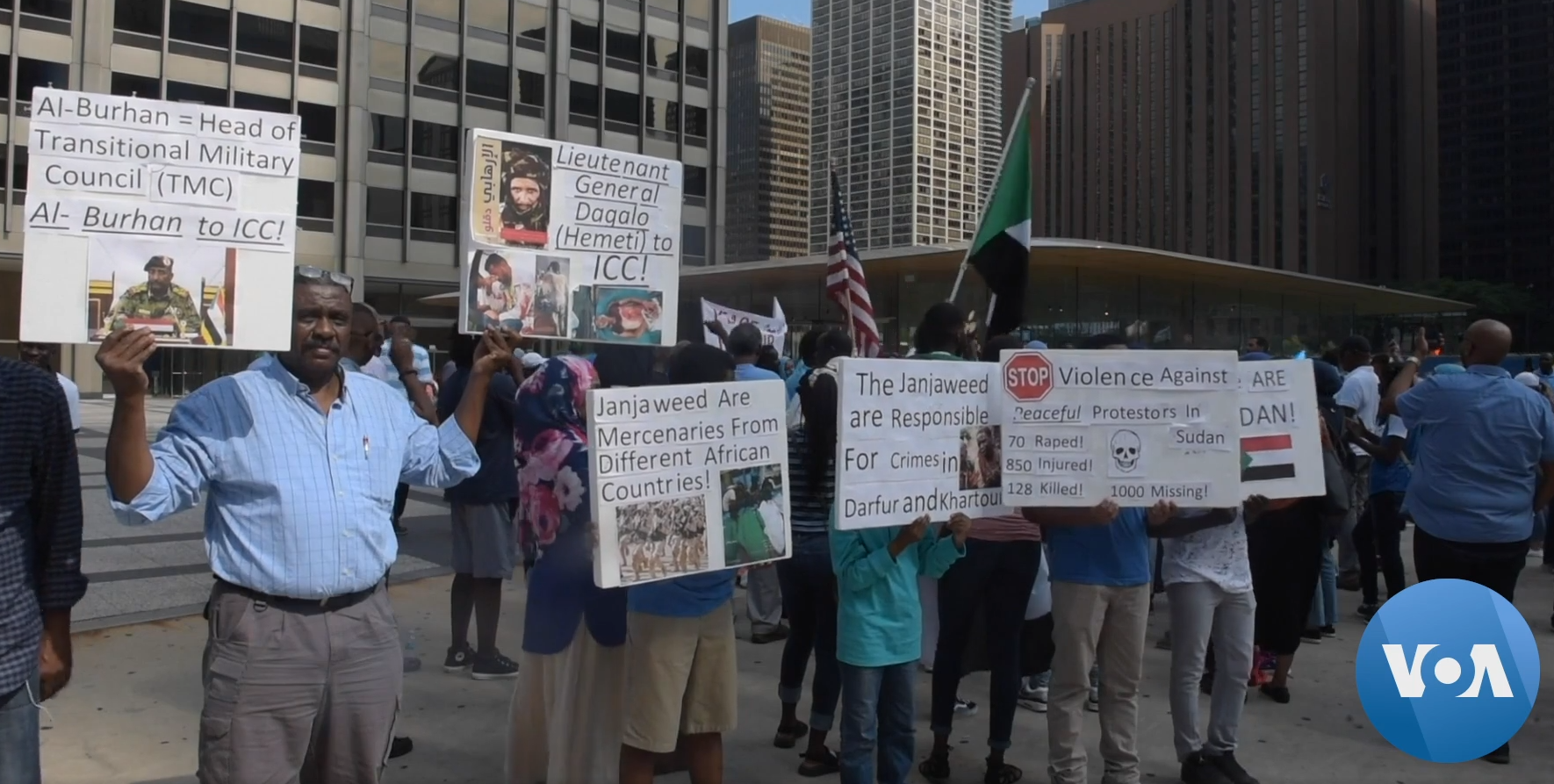
Solidarity protest in Chicago against the violations in Sudan

Humanitarian aid response in 2023

== See also ==
- List of massacres in South Sudan
- Sudanese Revolution
- War crimes during the Sudanese civil war (2023–present)
- Attacks on humanitarian workers
- Battle of Kutum
- Sirba, West Darfur
- Gezira State canal killings (2024–2025)
