= List of cities in Sudan =

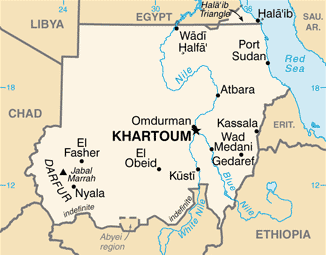
Map of Sudan

This is a list of cities and towns in Sudan. The population estimates are for 2006, last national census was of 1993.

== List ==
=== Major cities ===
Largest cities or towns in Sudan According to the 2008 census
Rank	Name	State	Pop.
1	Omdurman	Khartoum	1,849,659
2	Khartoum	Khartoum	1,410,858
3	Khartoum North	Khartoum	1,012,211
4	Nyala	South Darfur	492,984
5	Port Sudan	Red Sea	394,561
6	El Obeid	North Kordofan	345,126
7	Kassala	Kassala	298,529
8	Wad Madani	Gezira	289,482
9	El-Gadarif	Al Qadarif	269,395
10	El Fasher	North Darfur	217,827

=== Alphabetical list ===
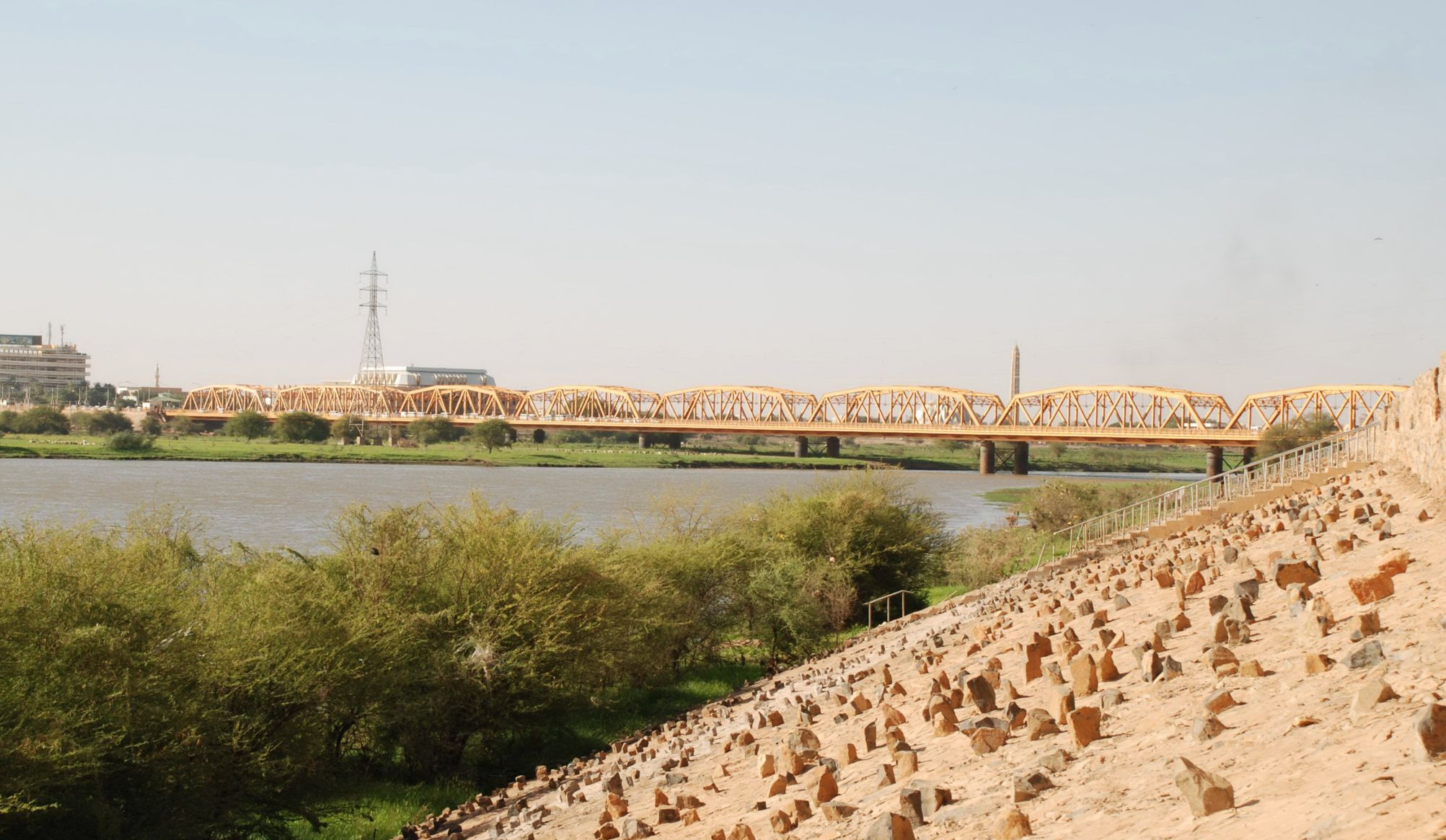
Omdurman, the second most populated city

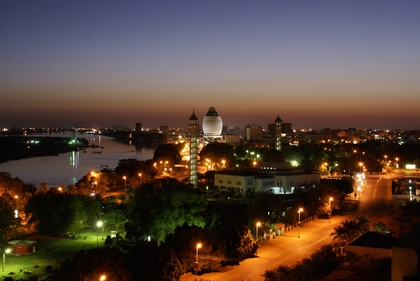
Khartoum, the capital of Sudan.

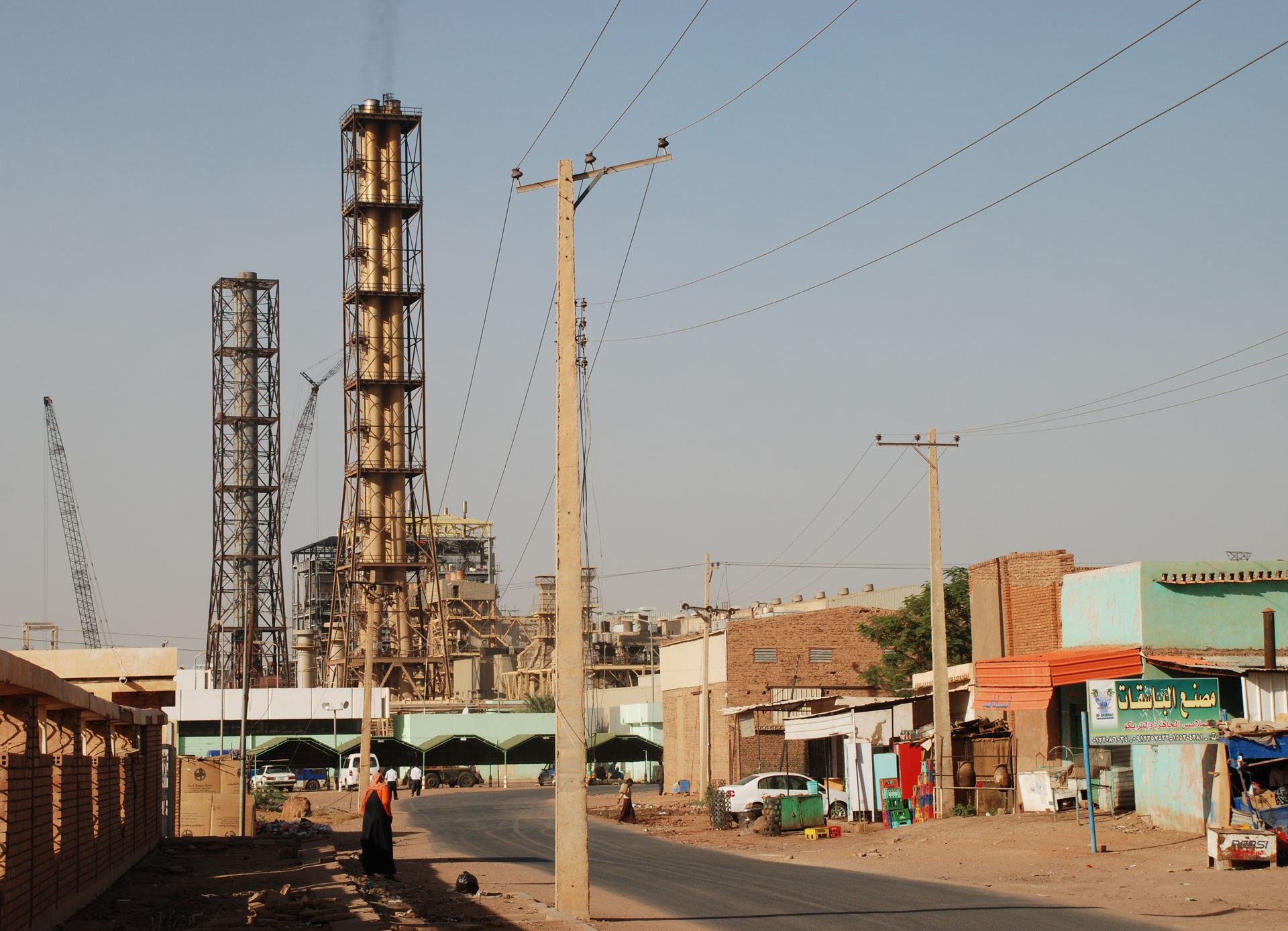
Khartoum Bahri

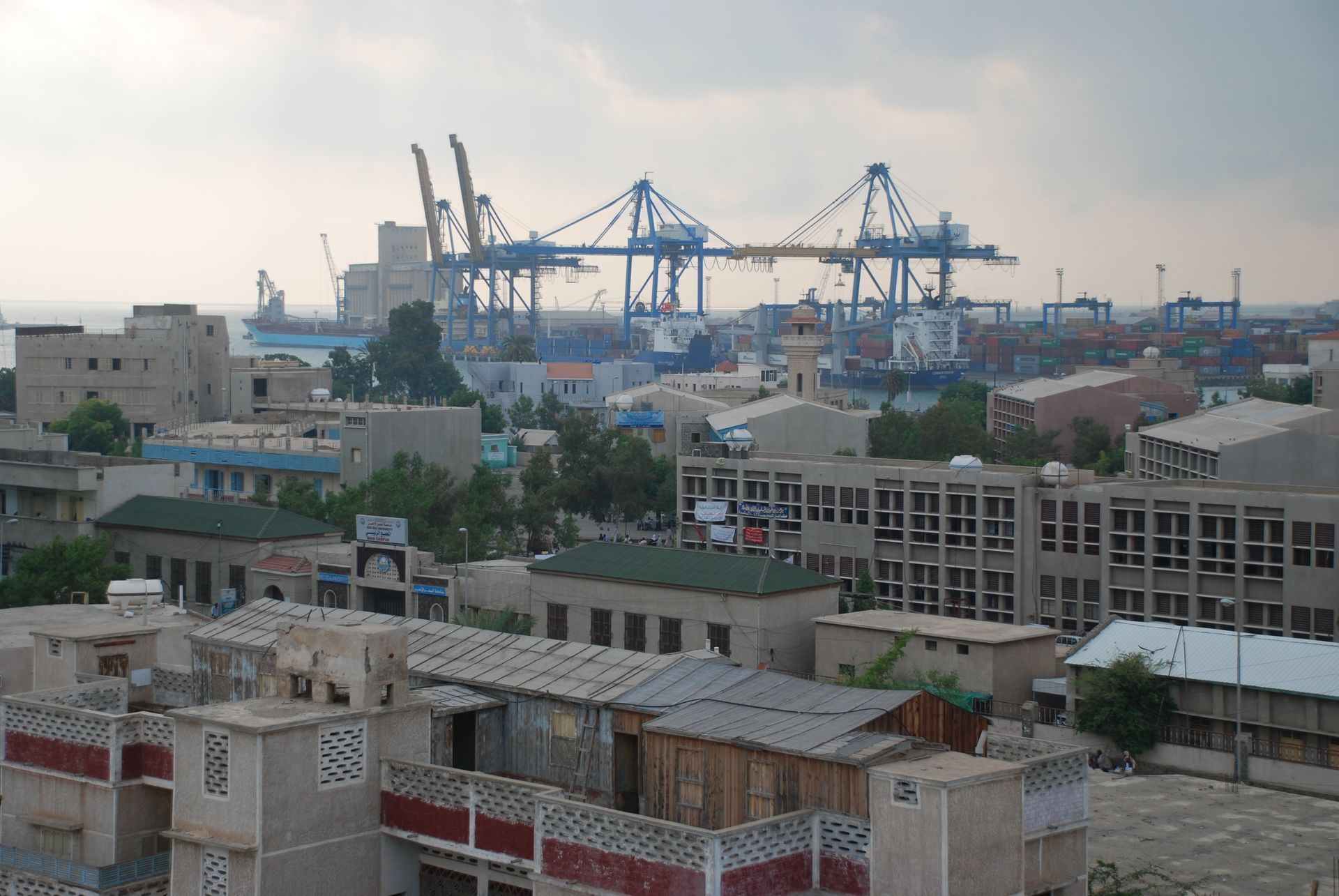
Port Sudan, the major seaport city

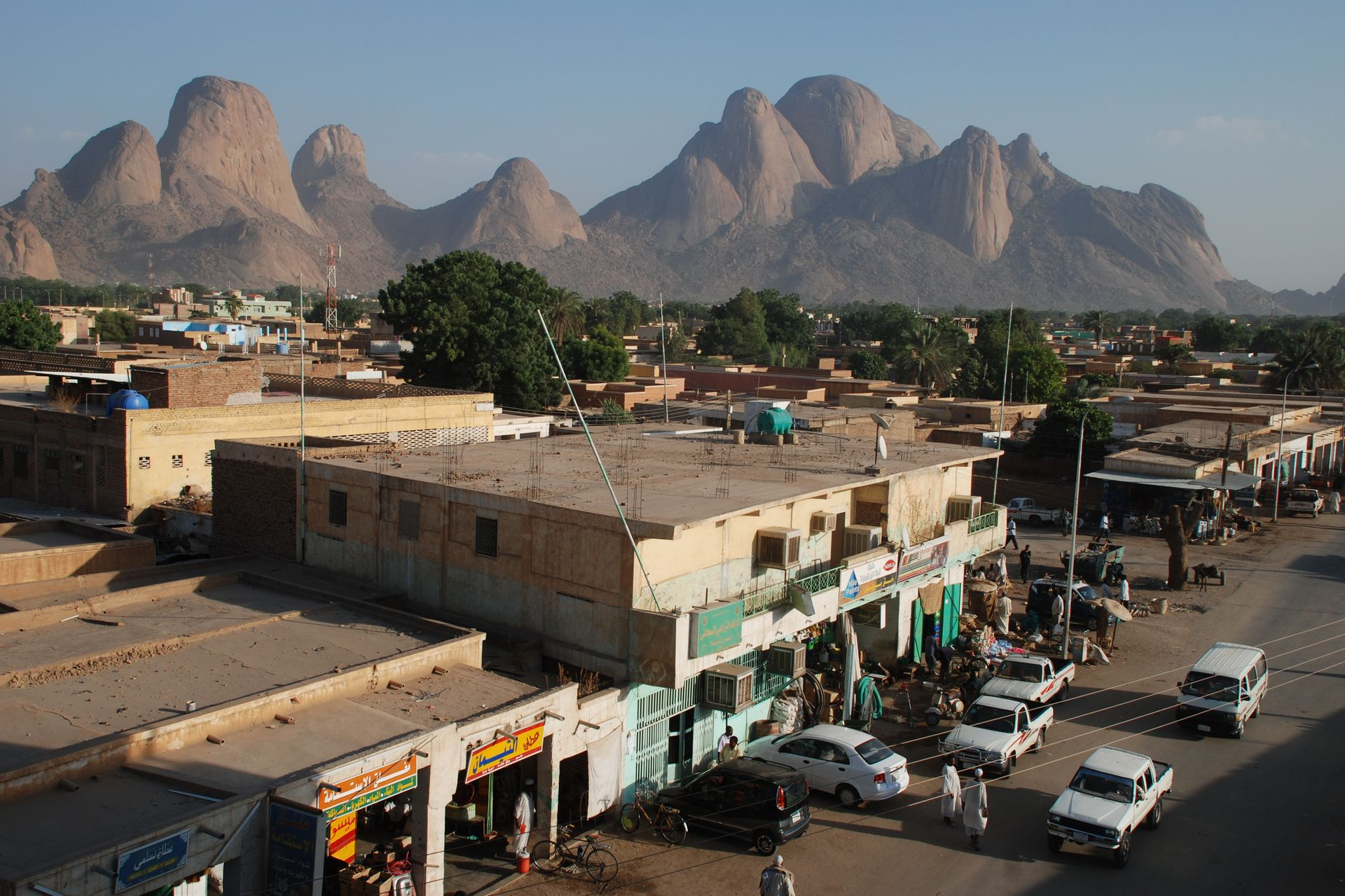
Kassala

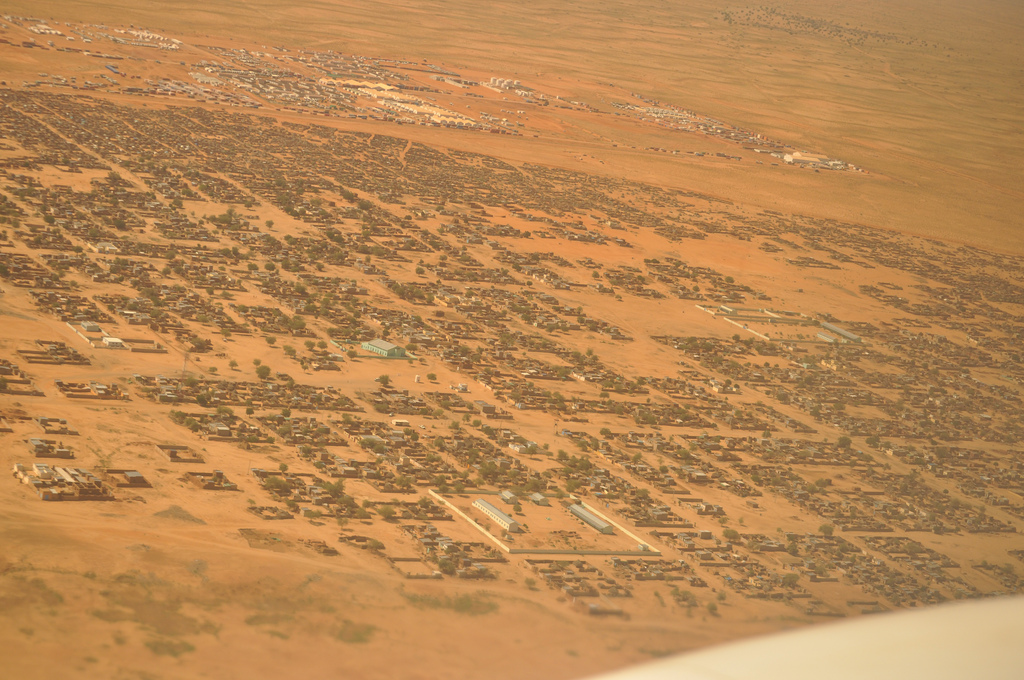
El Fasher

- Abekr
- Abushneib
- Abyei
- Al Maliha
- Al Manaqil
- Al-Sireha
- Al Qadarif
- Atbara
- Babanusa
- Berber
- Buwaidhaa
- Delgo
- Dongola
- Ad-Damazin
- Ed Dueim
- El Ait
- El Fasher
- El Gebir
- En Nahud
- El Obeid
- Er Rahad
- Dinder
- Foro Baranga
- Geneina
- Hala'ib
- Hashabah
- `Iyāl Bakhīt
- Jebel Moon or Jebel Mun
- Kaduqli
- Kassala
- Kauda
- Khartoum - Capital
- Khartoum North or Bahri
- Kornoi
- Kusti or Kosti
- Kreinik
- Merowe
- Muglad
- Nebelat el Hagana
- New Halfa or Halfa Aljadeda
- Nyala
- Omdurman
- Port Sudan or Bur Sudan
- Rabak
- Ruaba or Umm Rawaba
- Safita al-Ghunomab
- Saqiaah
- Saraf Omra
- Sennar or Sannar
- Shendi or Shandi
- Sindscha
- Singa
- Suakin
- Tabat or Al Shaikh Abdulmahmood
- Taiyara
- Tambul
- Tawila
- Tina
- Wad An Nora
- Wad Banda
- Wad Madani or Wad Medani
- Wadi Halfa
- Umbro
- Umm Badr
- Umm Bel
- Umm Dam
- Umm Debbi
- Umm Gafala
- Umm Keddada
- Umm Qantur
- Um Rawaba
- Umm Saiyala
- Umm Shanqa
- Zalingei

== See also ==
- Subdivisions of Sudan
- List of cities in South Sudan
- List of cities in East Africa
- List of metropolitan areas in Africa
- List of largest cities in the Arab world
