= Kafouri =

Neighbourhood in Sudan

Kafouri كافوري
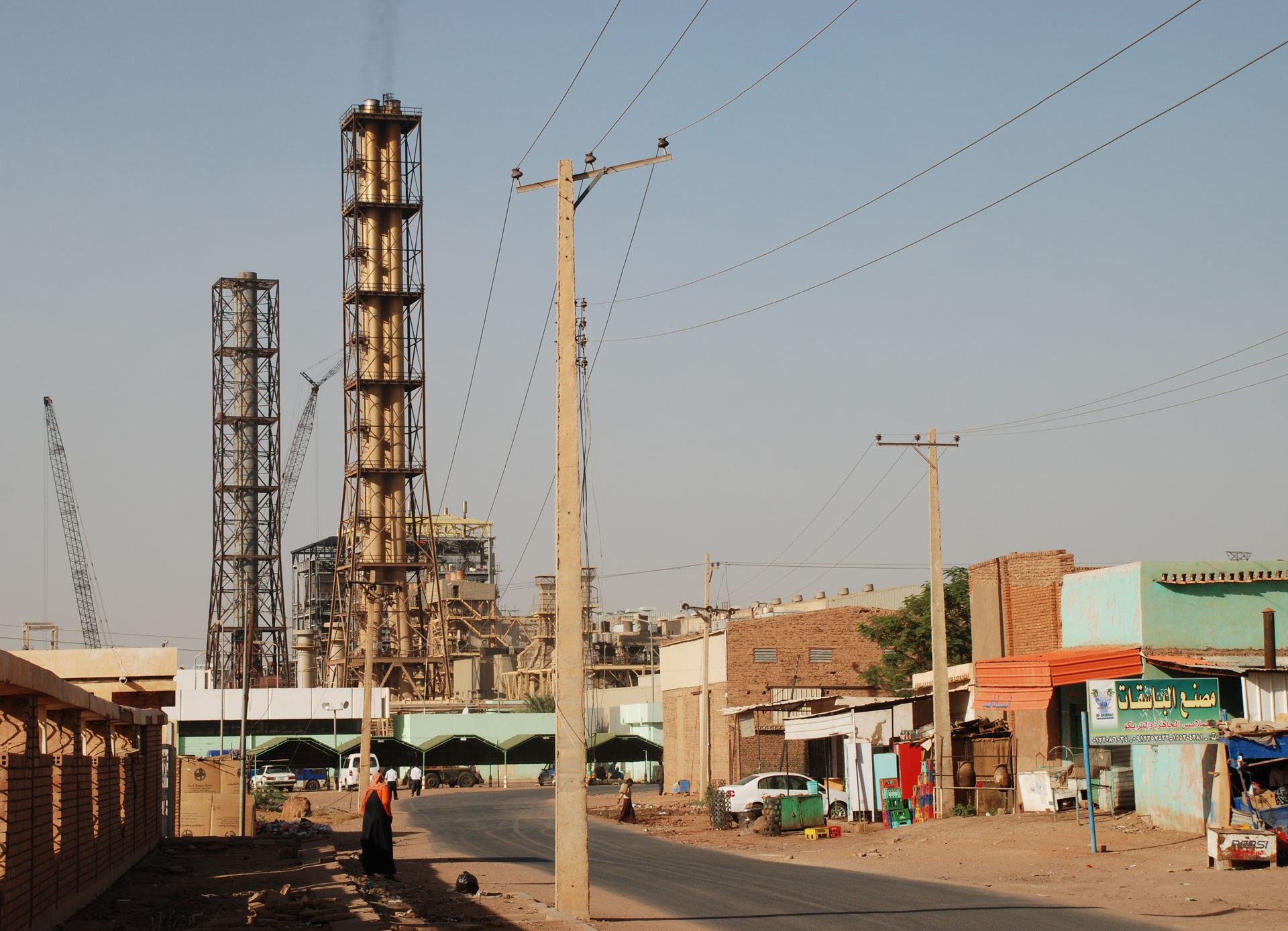
- Bahri thermal power station in 2008

- Location in Sudan
- Coordinates: 15°38′8.89246″N 32°34′22.58803″E
- Country: Sudan
- State: Khartoum
- City: Khartoum North
- Time zone: Central Africa Time, GMT + 3

Kafouri (Arabic: كافوري) is a prestigious neighbourhood located in Khartoum North, Khartoum State, Sudan. It is situated to the north of Khartoum city, the capital of Sudan. Kafouri was once a large farming area owned by a Lebanese trader named Aziz Kafouri, hence the name of the neighbourhood. It is known for its significance in the region and its proximity to Khartoum International Airport. However, it has also been a site of conflict and heavy fire due to fighting between rival forces in Sudan in 2023.

== Location ==
Kafouri neighbourhood is bounded to the west by the industrial zone, Kober (home of Kobar Prison), and al-Waha, and to the east by Hilla Coco Farms, to the north by the extension of the Ezba, and to the south by Kassala Street. Kafouri is divided into squares starting from square one up to 12.

== History ==
=== During Anglo-Egyptian occupation of Sudan ===
This area was named after Aziz Kafouri, who was born in Beirut. He traveled to Khartoum in the year 1899 after he was able to bring in shipments of wood, iron, and building materials for the purpose of rehabilitating the city of Khartoum after it had been devastated by the Mahdist War. At the beginning of his life in Sudan, Aziz Kafouri settled in the national capital, Omdurman, like some of the Syrians, Yemenis, and Jews who came to Sudan.

An English company declared bankruptcy due to the heavy losses it incurred in an attempt to irrigate and reclaim a thousand acres of land east of the Khartoum Bahri station, as the land was not ready for agriculture and the canals turned white due to the density of salt water. Aziz Kafouri took over this project at a low price and carried out complex and expensive agricultural operations. He worked for many years to wash salts from the land, organize irrigation and farming operations.

In 1922, when the establishment of the Gezira Scheme was announced as the largest irrigated project in the world; Aziz Kafouri doubled the area of his farm by purchasing 150 acres (61 ha) of good land located between the cities of Al-Hasahisa and al-Musallamiyah. However, the land was included in the Gezira Scheme, which prompted Kafouri to request the Anglo-Egyptian occupation of Sudan government to grant him an extension to his farm in Khartoum North towards al-Kadro, instead of financial compensation for the lands. The government agreed to the proposal. Aziz Kfoury cultivated about one thousand to two thousand acres of cotton annually until 1929, when the Great Depression occurred.

After that, there was a shift to wheat cultivation, followed by a gradual shift to raising dairy cattle. It flourished under the management of Aziz son's, Gabriel, and developed into a unique institution that supplied about 2,000 customers with milk and those who needed it throughout the triangular capital. It contained more than two thousand livestock, and milk operations involving 480 cows.

In 1981, the government issued a decision to convert the 3,000 acres (1,200 ha) farm into distinctive residential lands. However, over the following 35 years, only about 50 acres were gradually converted into residential lands. The proposed new city planning process has been included in the ranks of major operations, as the area to be planned exceeds the area of the original Khartoum 1, Khartoum 2, Khartoum 3 and Emtidad Nasser. It was completed in five months and culminated in the signing of an agreement on 22 May 1981. It was followed by surveys in the years 1982/1983.

=== Modern era ===
During the 2021 Sudanese coup d'état, on 26 October, Abdalla Hamdok, along with his wife, returned to his home in the Kafouri after being arrested as the start of the coup on 25 October. Hamdok's release followed international condemnation of the coup and calls for the military to release all the detained government officials. He was subjected to house arrest.

At start of the 2023 war in Sudan between the Sudanese Armed Forces (SAF) and Rapid Support Forces in April, locals mentioned a resurgence in fighting near Kafouri neighborhood. In Kafouri, much of the fighting came from Sudanese air force bombing RSF targets in the neighborhood. By 1 May, SAF continued their bombing campaign in Kafouri, and bombed Bahri's al-Inqaz street. The neighborhood came under the control of the Sudanese Armed Forces in February 2025 during the 2024–2025 Bahri offensive.

== Landmarks ==
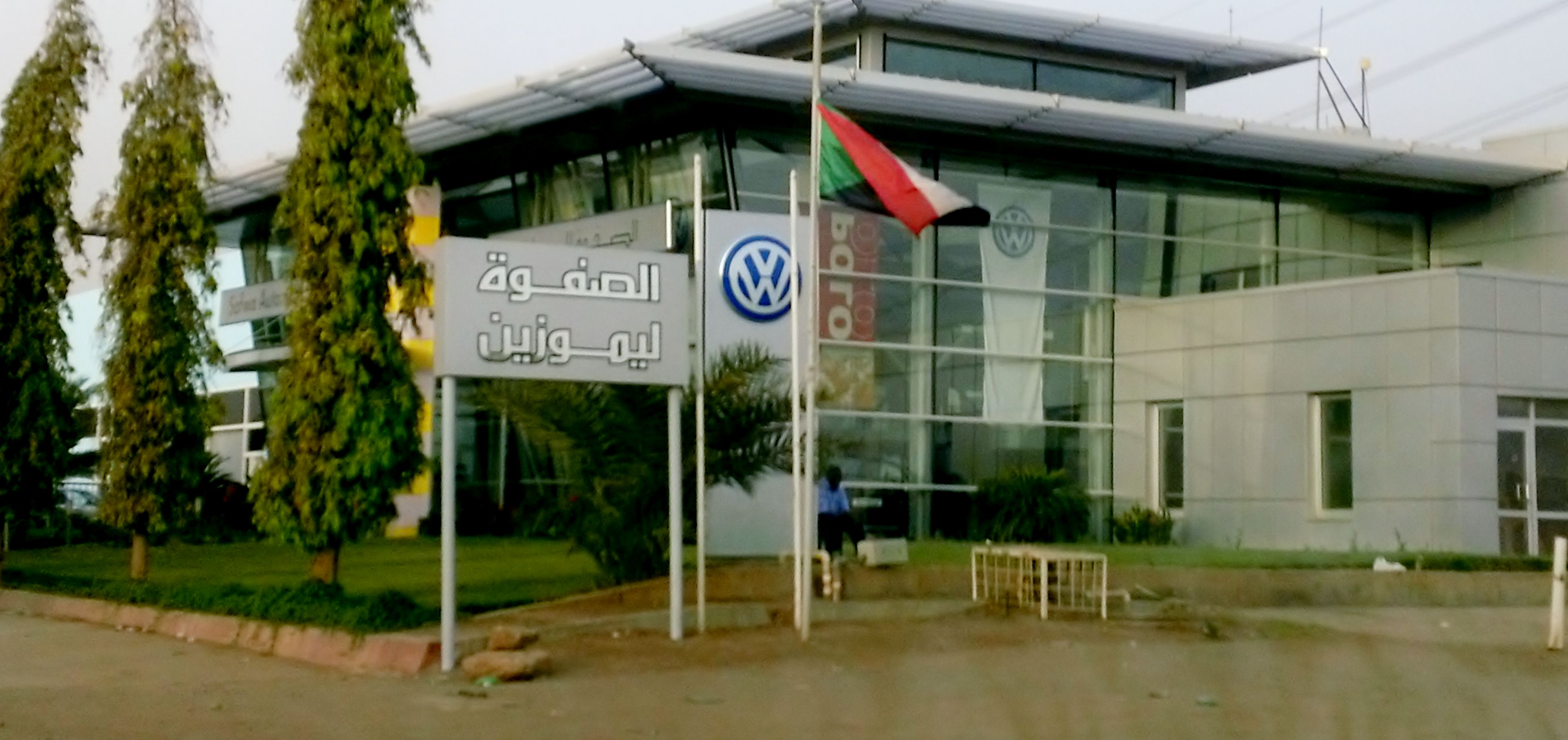
Al-Safwa Cars

- Diamond Lounge
- Sana Mall
- Al-Safwa Cars

=== Mosques ===
- Al-Noor Islamic Complex
- Abdul Qader Al-Fadni Mosque
- Martyr Othman Hassan Ahmed Al-Bashir Mosque
- Sheikh Hamad bin Jabr Al Thani Mosque

=== Schools ===
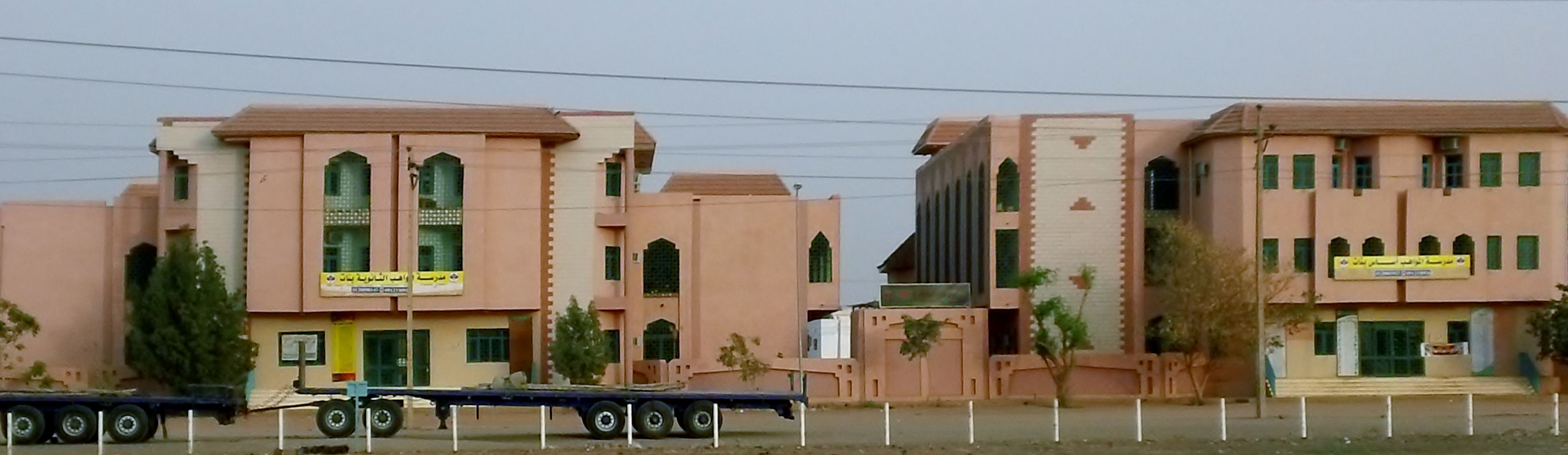
Mauhib Schools

- Mauhib schools
- Oasis schools
- Turkish schools

=== Hospitals ===
- Sheikh Hamad bin Jabr Al Thani Medical Centre
