= 2024 eastern Gezira State massacres =

Retaliatory civilian massacres by the RSF

- Part of war crimes during the Sudanese civil war (2023–present)
- Location: Eastern Gezira State, Sudan
- Date: October 2024 – December 2024
- Attack type: Massacre, looting, arson, systemic rape
- Deaths: 8,000+
- Perpetrator: Rapid Support Forces
- Motive: Retaliation against the defection of Gezira State commander Abu Aqla Kikal to the Sudanese Armed Forces
- Thousands of civilians displaced from at least 24 villages

The 2024 eastern Gezira State massacres referred to the retaliatory mass killing of civilians in at least thirty Sudanese villages in Gezira State by the Rapid Support Forces (RSF) starting on 20 October 2024, which killed thousands of people. Impacted settlements, including al-Sireha, Safita al-Ghunomab, Zurqa, Deim Elias, Tambul, and Saqiaah, also suffered from systemic sexual violence, widespread looting and arson of properties, and destruction of healthcare facilities, displacing thousands of villagers.

== Background ==
Several massacres against civilian populations have been conducted by the RSF since the beginning of the Sudanese civil war in 2023. Among these include the dual attacks on Wad Al-Noora in Gezira State on 5 June 2024 following a lengthy siege of the village, resulting in 100 to 200 civilian deaths.

The RSF later committed the Galgani massacre where at least 108 people, including at least 24 women and children, were killed by the RSF in the central Sudanese Sennar State on 15 August 2024 following a series of prior attacks targeting civilians in the village.

== Massacres ==
In October 2024, top RSF commander Abu Aqlah Keikel who took control of Gezira State defected to the Sudanese Armed Forces. In retaliation, several RSF militants began to trek across northern and eastern Gezira State to target civilians starting on 20 October 2024, destroying and pillaging several villages and towns in their path. The Sudanese Doctors’ Union reported that the destruction included systematic rape, looting of buildings and healthcare facilities, and the burning and destroying of multiple structures.

On 24 October 2024, RSF militants began to attack the Gezira State village of al-Sireha, continuing the assault for three days. By 29 October, at least 141 people were killed, of which over fifty were killed during 25 October alone. 200 more were reported to be wounded in al-Sireha alone. The Resistance Committees stated that at least twelve more people were killed in the village of Saqiaah, and reported that rescue workers and medical personnel were unable to reach victims due to heavy sniper fire and bombing from RSF militants.

The Al Jazirah Conference reported that across thirty settlements, 300 civilians were killed, with the death toll being considered incomplete due to ongoing search missions and telecommunication outages. Eight civilians were killed in Zurqa, fourteen were killed in Safita al-Ghunomab, with another thirteen were killed in Maknun, twelve in Tambul, and two in Deim Elias. One surviving villager from Ad al-Khadr reported that RSF militants had killed a villager, indiscriminately shot into the village, and then set farmlands on fire. At least 24 villages initiated evacuations of their populations, resulting in thousands being displaced. Six people were killed in Wad Al-Fadl, while eight died in Al-Faj Al-Bashir. Two killings also occurred in Al-Fawla Al-Afsa and Al-Nasrab. The United Nations said that at least ten children were killed in the massacres.

On 6 November, the RSF was accused of killing at least 86 people, by shooting dead 13 people and fatally poisoning 73 others in the city of Al Hilaliya by handing out food laced with contaminated with urea fertilizer. By 17 November, the death toll in the city had reached 527.

By 27 November, the Al Jazirah Conference estimated that at least 1,000 people had been killed in the massacres by the RSF. On 11 December, that number rose to more than 7,000 (from December 2023, in the whole Jazirah state).

== Impact ==
Apart from the massacres, at least 71 cases of rape were recorded across Gezira State that were blamed on the RSF, including that of at least three minors, two of which later died from injuries sustained. In the town of Rufaa alone, 37 rapes occurred during RSF attacks from 21 to 26 October.

The United Nations said that at least 135,400 people had been displaced in Gezira State since 20 October due to the RSF attacks. The Al Jazirah Conference said that 400 villages have been completely depopulated, while 115 others were partially emptied.

== Investigation ==
The Transitional Sovereignty Council ordered Attorney General Mohamed Issa Tayfour to conduct an investigation into the massacres.

== Reactions ==
- UN: Clementine Nkweta-Salami, coordinator in Sudan, condemned the massacres and stated "These are atrocious crimes."
- Egypt: The foreign ministry condemned the attacks stating it was targeting civilians and violating international humanitarian law.
- Saudi Arabia: The foreign ministry stated that the RSF caused deaths, injuries, and were violating international law and also urged both sides to adhere to the Jeddah Treaty.
- Qatar: The foreign ministry stated that the attacks included brutal violations and stressed the need for the international community to prioritize Sudan's crisis.
- United States: State Department spokesperson Matthew Miller stated "The U.S will continue to impose costs on those fueling atrocities in Sudan".

== See also ==
- List of massacres in Sudan
