= List of massacres in South Sudan =

List of the massacres in Sudan

The following is a list of massacres that have occurred in South Sudan in reverse chronological order:

== List ==
| Name | Date | Deaths | Involved | Location – Circumstances |
|---|---|---|---|---|
| Abiemnom massacre | 1 March 2026 | 169 | Local armed youth | Abiemnom – Mass killing of Dinka civilians and soldiers |
| Bentiu massacre | 15 April 2014 | 400+ | Nuer-led SPLM/A-IO | Bentiu – Mass killing of Dinka civilians |
| Nuer massacre | 15–18 December 2013 | 47,000 – 50,000 | Dinka-led SSPDF | Juba – Mass killing of Nuer civilians |
| Pibor massacre | 23 December 2011–4 January 2012 | 900+ | Nuer White Army | Pibor County – Mass killing of Murle civilians |
| Bor massacre | 15 November 1991 | 5,000 to 20,000 | Riek Machar's SPLA-Nasir Nuer fighters | Bor – Mass killing of Dinka civilians |
| 1965 Juba and Wau massacres | July 1965 | 1,000 to 3,000 | Sudanese Armed Forces | Juba and Wau – Mass killing of non-Arab civilians |
