= 1987 Dhein massacre =

Massacre in Sudan (1987)

Dhein massacre
- Native name: مذبحة الضعين
- Location: 11°27′39″N 26°7′42″E; Dhein, East Darfur
- Date: 27–28 March 1987
- Target: Dinka people
- Attack type: Mass murder; Scorched earth; Arson; Kidnapping and enslavement
- Weapons: Spears; Knives; Guns
- Deaths: +1,000
- Perpetrator: Muraheleen (mainly Rizeigat militia)
- Motive: Anti-black racism; Tribalism; Arab nationalism; Islamism

The Dhein massacre began on the evening of Friday, 27 March 1987, when the Muraheleen militia (mainly from the Rizeigat tribe) attacked a church where 25 Dinkas had gathered for evening prayers. Subsequently, they or another group targeted nearby Dinka homes, setting fire to several houses and killing 5 or 7 individuals. That Friday night, some Dinkas fled, with some hiding with local families in Dhein, while others sought refuge in Hillat Sikka Hadid, a neighbourhood near the railway station, where they were under police protection.

On Saturday morning, 28 March 1987, officials moved the Dinkas from Hillat Sikka Hadid to the railway station to evacuate them from the town for their safety. They were placed in eight railway wagons, with the remainder staying in the station's police centre. Later, a large group of Muraheleen and other Dhein residents, mostly Rizeigat, stormed the railway station and attacked the Dinkas. By sunset on Saturday, over a thousand Dinkas had been killed. The surviving Dinkas were then transported to Nyala by train.

The massacre in Dhein resulted in over a thousand Dinka deaths and the kidnapping and enslavement of an unknown number of Dinka children and women by some Rizeigat Arabs.

== Background ==
In 1987, Dhein, or Ed Daein, the principal town in eastern southern Darfur and location of the Eastern District Council headquarters, has a population of around 60,000, predominantly from the Rizeigat tribe, with Zaghawa, Dinka, Barti, and Hausa minorities.

Despite its lack of army presence, Dhein held political significance, particularly for the Umma Party. Dhein was also strategically located in the conflict between the government and the Sudan People's Liberation Army (SPLA) south of Bahr al-Arab. Government-supported militias known as the Muraheleen, many from Dhein's Rizeigat, source funds for arms from local merchants. The town receives stolen cattle and kidnapped Dinka women and children. Dhein, connected by rail and road, is a commercial grain and cattle trade hub.

Dinka migration to Dhein began in 1964 due to the First Sudanese Civil War, and they established a church in the town around the same time, aimed for cordial relations with Muslims by offering English classes and a nursery. Many of the Dinka returned south post-Addis Ababa Agreement (1972) but fled back to Dhein during the Second Sudanese Civil War due to militia attacks. In 1986, an Islamic group census counted 16,970 Dinkas. Economically, they engaged in agricultural labour, factory work, construction, and various temporary jobs. Few were government employees, with many from the Luwo people perishing in the Police Centre fire. The Dinka population in Dhein was about 16,970.

In 1985, SPLA units appeared in Dinka land south of Bahr al-Arab. That year, amid northern famine, Rizeigat groups settled with the Dinka peacefully. The Transitional Military Council (TMC) saw Dinka support as crucial to the SPLA, prompting strategies to undermine it by arming the Muraheleen militia, which was made of Rizeigat and Misseiria. Sadig al-Mahdi, as Prime Minister, intensified these strategies, fuelling historical Dinka-Rizeigat tensions. By late 1985, militias began attacking Dinka villages, resulting in numerous deaths, kidnappings of women and children, cattle theft, and property destruction. These assaults persisted and became a primary source of income, with government officials allegedly involved in selling the stolen cattle until SPLA forces provided protection in mid-1986.

Other forms of banditry by militias included violent attacks, such as the 1986 ambush on a Dinka-owned lorry, resulting in 30 deaths.

In early 1987, further Rizeigat attacks, including those aided by Fallata Umbararu, led to significant casualties and more kidnappings. Battles between SPLA and Muraheleen militias culminated in SPLA reclaiming stolen cattle. The government's tactics caused widespread Dinka displacement and reinforced banditry and slavery among the Rizeigat, creating a hostile environment that led to massacres.

== The massacre ==
=== Friday 27 March ===
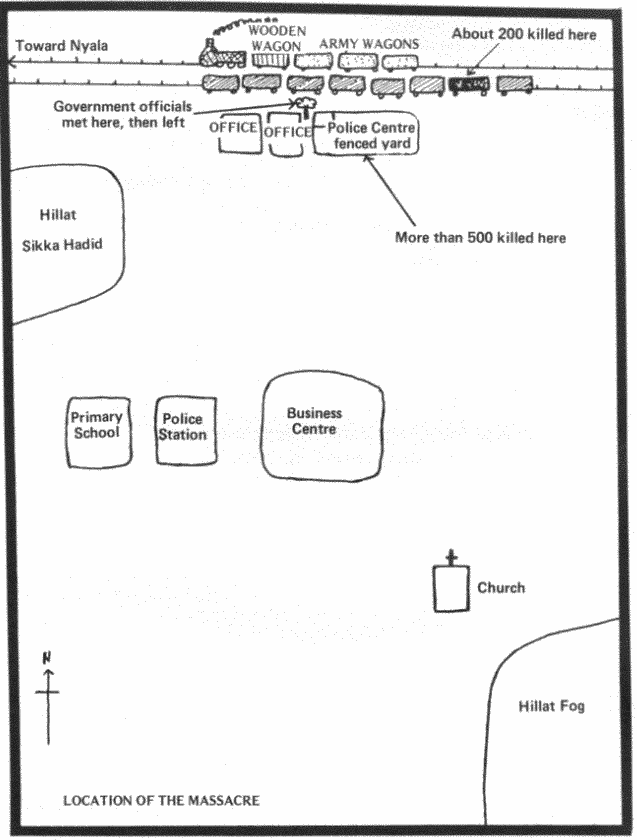
Dhein map

On Friday evening, 27 March 1987, a series of violent events took place, starting with an attack on a church. Around fifty from the Muraheleen militia (mainly from the Rizeigat Arabs) assaulted Dinka worshippers, who had gathered for evening prayers, with weapons including spears, knives, and a gun, beating them and chasing them out. Following the attack, they proceeded to burn Dinka's homes in Hillat Fog, causing the Dinkas to flee to the police station for safety. During these events, 5-7 Dinkas were killed, and many fled the town. The Dinkas faced obstructions from attackers, including women and children, who even prevented the police and fire services from intervening.

By 8 PM, many Dinkas had taken refuge in the police station yard. The highest local officials decided to protect them and awaited further instructions from higher authorities. The Dinkas were then moved to a nearby primary school for better protection. Still, due to security concerns, they were later relocated to Hillat Sikka Hadid, a neighbourhood near the railway station, where they spent the night. The next day, merchants suggested relocating the Dinkas out of Dhein for their safety, but the decision was postponed until a security committee meeting.

=== Saturday 28 March ===
On 28 March at 7 a.m., government officials, including Administrative Officer Adam al-Tahir and the Deputy Police Chief of Dhein Ali al-Manna, moved the Dinkas from Hillat Sikka Hadid to the railway station. They boarded eight wagons, but many others sought refuge in the police centre or waited under trees. As news spread, hundreds of armed Muraheleen gathered at the station to stop the Dinkas from leaving. They blocked the train and harassed the Dinkas, who took shelter in steel wagons. Despite police presence, attackers burned Dinkas in a wooden wagon and the police centre. Survivors described how attackers used burning materials to force Dinkas out of the steel wagons, killing and burning those who tried to escape.

A meeting at 10 a.m. with top officials and Rizeigat chiefs, including Ali al-Radi and Hammad Bushara, was disrupted by attackers, leading to officials and police leaving the scene. The attackers continued the massacre, killing Dinkas inside the wagons and in hiding throughout the town. The massacre ended around 6 p.m., with unconfirmed reports of government officials urging hidden Dinkas to go to the station. By 7 p.m., a train with minimal impact on the Dinkas departed for Nyala, while others remained until Sunday morning when another train evacuated them.

=== Sunday 29 March ===
On the morning of 29 March, the first train arrived in Nyala with about 200 massacre survivors. By 3 p.m., a second train brought around 800 more survivors, including 32 wounded and 2 who had died en route. Survivors who fled Dhein are now located in Kas, Nyala, Fasher, Tulus, Buram, and Khartoum. In Kas and Nyala, they received aid from Oxfam, the Red Cross, United States Agency for International Development, European Economic Community, and the Sudan Council of Churches, with local residents also providing food and shelter.

== Casualties ==
Following the massacre, dead bodies were scattered across the streets and railway station in Dhein, decomposing and causing fears of an epidemic. Some bodies were disposed of in latrines, dragged outside the town, or buried in mass graves north of the railway station and in the town cemetery.

=== Death toll ===
According to the Sudanese Doctor's Trade Union, 212 people were killed and buried in two mass graves. Still, this figure is disputed by the Sudan Relief and Rehabilitation Association (SRRA). The Minister of the Interior estimated the deaths at 183. Still, the Governor of Bahr el-Ghazal William Ajal Deng estimated fewer than 300 deaths. An unnamed official stated in the Al Ayam newspaper that there were only 14 deaths.

Contrary, the Islamic Front through its Al-Rai Al-Aam newspaper reported over 900 deaths, with 426 killed at the railway station, 200 near the water yard, and 367 near the church. All the dead were Dinkas with additional 10 Rizeigat. Moreover, the SRRA investigation suggests that the death toll of 'more than a thousand' is a conservative estimate. The SRRA investigation confirmed around 500 people had taken refuge at the police centre, and all were killed. In addition, one wooden wagon full of Dinkas was completely burned, many Dinkas in steel wagons were killed by various means, and additional deaths occurred in the streets, bakeries, and brick-making sites.

=== Slavery ===
Slavery has re-emerged forcefully in Rizeigat society since 1986, supported by the al-Mahdi government war policies. The government was aware of the kidnapping and enslavement of Dinka children, women, and young girls, as it collaborated with the militias responsible, generating a belief among the Rizeigat that the Dinka were subhuman, eliminating psychological barriers to their mistreatment and killing.

Survivors reported that their enslaved children were being sold, and many relatives were in slavery, with complaints to officials yielding no results. Investigations confirm the existence of slavery, directly connected to the Dhein massacre.

== Analysis ==
The official explanations by Prime Minister Sadiq al-Mahdi and other government officials attributed the massacre to a revenge attack by the SPLA. But according to the Sudan Relief and Rehabilitation Association (SRRA), government policies exacerbated ethnic tensions and encouraged Rizeigat militias to engage in violent and criminal activities, resulting in the massacre. Social changes, economic pressures, and inter-ethnic competition further fuelled hostile attitudes towards the Dinka, culminating in the massacre.

According to the SRRA, when the massacre occurred, Dhein was a town in turmoil, plagued by ethnic competition and religious fanaticism, with the church becoming a focal point of religious fanaticism and land disputes, creating bitterness among Rizeigat families. Rizeigat youth engaged in thuggery and lawlessness and mobilised against the Dinka and Zaghawa communities. Symbolic acts, such as tearing down official signs, reflected the rising ethnic chauvinism. Internal conflicts within the Rizeigat community included disagreements between old sheikhs and the youth and class disparities exacerbated by economic changes.

=== Police role ===
During the massacre, the police largely abandoned their duties, with many leaving the scene as the violence began. Eyewitnesses described a policeman in traditional attire participating in the killings, including the murder of Deng Alwel, a Dinka chief. Additionally, some police extorted money from the Dinkas, demanding 5 Sudanese pound (£Sd) for protection, which about thirty Dinkas paid.

Internally, the police were disorganised. Deputy Chief of Police Ali al-Manna was in shock and failed to give coherent orders, eventually retreating to his office. In contrast, officer Abdel-Rahman al-Fideili, a Rizeigat, actively defended the Dinkas by shooting at the attackers.

=== Premeditation ===
A policeman informed Ariek Piol, a Dinka leader, on 26 March about an impending attack, advising the Dinkas to leave. Despite his warnings, most did not believe him, though a few left on Friday morning. The police also summoned Dinka leaders on the same day, advising them to stay home and avoid large gatherings. The police force was on alert from 25 March to the evening of 27 March. Additionally, survivor Agol Akol overheard a conversation about expelling the Dinkas from Dhein four days before the massacre but was not believed when she reported it.

== See also ==
- List of massacres in Sudan
