= Zurqa =

Village in Sudan

Zurqa أزرق
- Village
- Location in Sudan
- Coordinates: 15°5′26.8″N 32°58′44.5″E
- Country: Sudan
- State: Gezira
- Time zone: UTC+2 (CAT)

Zurqa is a village in Gezira State, Sudan. It is located 10 km east of Tambul.

== RSF massacre during the Sudanese civil war (2023-present) ==
The RSF killed at least eight people in Zurqa during the October 2024 eastern Gezira State massacres.
