= Muraheleen =

Baggara Arabs militia (1983–2005)

- المراحلين
- Dates active: 1983–2005
- Merged into: Popular Defence Forces in 1989 (officially); Janjaweed
- Country: Sudan
- Allegiance: Sudanese Armed Forces
- Groups: Baggara Arabs: Rizeigat tribe; Messiria tribe
- Active regions: Bahr el Ghazal; Nuba Mountains; southern Darfur; southern Kordofan
- Status: Defunct
- Wars: Second Sudanese Civil War; War in Darfur

The Muraheleen (Arabic: المراحلين, can be spelled as Murahilin or Murahleen), also known as al-Maraheel (Arabic: المراحيل), were tribal militias primarily composed of Rizeigat and Messiria tribes from western Sudan. They were armed since 1983 by successive Sudanese governments to suppress the insurgency of the Sudan People's Liberation Army (SPLA) during the Second Sudanese Civil War. Their activities included raiding Dinka villages, looting cattle, abducting and enslaving women and children, and causing widespread destruction. The Muraheleen were notorious for their brutal tactics, which contributed to famine and displacement among the affected populations.

In the 1980s and 1990s, the Muraheleen played a crucial role in the government's counter-insurgency strategy, benefiting from state support in the form of weapons, ammunition, and logistical assistance. Their actions were characterised by severe human rights abuses, including using scorched earth tactics, mass murder and ethnic cleansing.

Their role diminished after the 2005 Comprehensive Peace Agreement, which aimed to end the civil war.

== Etymology ==
The origin of the word Muraheleen is attributed to the Messiria tribe who used the word to describe "travellers".

== Background ==
Historically, Muraheleen's primary duty was to guide the cattle herds ahead of their tribe during the seasonal migration. They would ride horses, carry weapons for self-defence, and safeguard their herds from predators and cattle thieves. In the southern region of Darfur, the Rizeigat tribe has a similar group known as the fursan, an Arabic term meaning horsemen or cavaliers.

The border dispute between the Malual Dinka from northern Bahr el Ghazal (today in South Sudan) and the Baggara Arabs from southern Darfur and southern Kordofan originated in the mid-19th century. Upon their departure from Sudan in 1956, the British ensured that the Dinka and Baggara adhered to border agreements and legal principles.

Post-independence, the northern Sudanese authorities went back on their pledge to maintain the colonial boundaries between Bahr el Ghazal, Darfur, and Kordofan. They proposed merging the distinct grazing and fishing territories of the Mulual Dinka and the Baggara to hasten the unification of the two ethnic communities. This planned integration reignited tensions between the Dinka and Baggara herders.

== History ==
The concept of jihad was reintroduced to the country in 1983 when President Gaafar Nimeiry declared the September 1983 Laws. The Muraheleen, state-backed Baggara armed factions, surfaced along the Malual Dinka-Baggara frontier and were later converted into government militia forces in southern Darfur and southern Kordofan for jihad and conquest. This resulted in the killing of 1,500 Malual Dinka refugees in the 1987 Dhein Massacre.

In addition, Nimeiry used the militia against southern rebels. The armed Rizeigat and Messiria Humr horsemen, wearing white long robes, were as a low cost way of weakening the Sudan's government enemies during the Second Sudanese Civil War, including the rebel Sudan People's Liberation Movement/Army (SPLM/A), which has a base of support among the (Ngok and Titweng) Dinka of southern Sudan. After the 1985 Sudanese coup d'état and the deposition of Nimeiry, Prime Minister Sadiq al-Mahdi's government employed the Muraheleen and its military successors for almost twenty years as a counterinsurgency force against the southern-based rebels, the SPLM/A.

The Muraheleen militias often destroyed Christian villages, killed all their adult males and then took the women and children as slaves. The first slave raid on the Dinka took place in February 1986. Two thousand women and children were taken. In a second raid, in February 1987, one thousand women and children were taken. Once the raiders acquired enough booty they would distribute the captives between themselves and their families. The raids continued every year after.

Since 1989, an essential responsibility of the Muraheleen has been to escort the military supply train to Wau. They load their horses onto the train, which are then unloaded upon arrival in Bahr el Ghazal to be used in conflicts against Dinka villages.

Following the 1989 Sudanese coup d'état, Omar al-Bashir's government incorporated the Muraheleen into official government militias controlled by the army and continued to receive government support to attack Dinka and Nuer civilians, whose men had joined the southern rebel SPLA.

The militia also deployed against the Nuba peoples, to crush the rebellions in the Nuba Mountains (South Kordofan and Blue Nile states). In 2004, experts of the United Nations Commission on Human Rights accused that militia of participating in the Darfur genocide by targeting Masalit, Daju, Tunjur, and Zaghawa people.

=== 1987 Dhein Massacre ===
The 1987 Dhein Massacre took place in the town of Dhein, located in Southern Darfur. Over two days, 27–28 March, a large number of Dinka children, women, and men were brutally killed, burnt to death, and seized as booty or ghanīma. Some members of the Rizeigat Arabs, and others in the town, including certain merchants in Dhein, who were all part of the Muraheleen, carried out the massacre.

=== 1988 and 1988 famines ===
The Muraheleen played a key role in the 1988 and 1998 famines in Bahr el Ghazal. During the 1988 famine, in which an estimated 250,000 died, the Muraheleen – since 1986 – were sanctioned by the government to carry out looting, raiding, displacement, killing, and abduction of the Dinka people, leading to a significant transfer of Dinka cattle wealth to the Baggara, and the forced displacement of almost 100,000 to 200,000 civilians.

The 1998 famine in Bahr El Ghazal, which affected 2.6 million people, was caused by a combination of natural conditions, such as a two-year drought caused by El Niño–Southern Oscillation, and human actions. The Muraheleen's government-backed raids on the Dinka people caused displacement and hindered farming. The raids also involved the theft of cattle, looting of grain, burning of crops and homes, and seizing of women and children as booty, played a major role in causing the famine.

=== Dinka enslavement ===
During the war the Sudanese Armed Forces revived the use of enslavement as a weapon against the south, and particularly Christian prisoners of war, on the basis that Islamic law purportedly allowed it.

Human Rights Watch and others have described the contemporary form of slavery in Sudan as mainly the work of the armed, government-backed militia of the Baggara tribes, including the Muraheleen, who raid civilians—primarily of the Dinka ethnic group from the southern region of Bahr El Ghazal. The Muraheleen captured children and women who were taken to western Sudan and elsewhere as ghanimah to be slaves and concubines. They were "forced to work for free in homes and fields, punished when they refuse, and abused physically and sometimes sexually".

Dinka girls kept in northern Sudanese households were used as sex slaves. Some of them were sold in Libya. Western visitors noted that at slave markets, five or even more slaves could be bought for one rifle. Near the peak of the civil war in 1989, female black slaves were sold for 90 dollars at the slave markets. Several years later, the price of an average female black slave had dropped to $15. Many Western organisations traveled to Sudan with funds to purchase and emancipate these enslaved captives.

== Disbandment ==
Officially, the Muraheleen were incorporated into the Popular Defence Forces, a premilitary force established officially under the Popular Defence Forces Act of 1989. But the Human Rights Watch documented atrocities committed by the militia beyond this date. In October 1996, it was reported that the militia raided Ruweng, southern Sudan. In 2001, The New Humanitarian reported a raid by the Muraheleen in Marial Bai were 122 women and children were abducted and 5,075 cattle were stolen. On 21 January 2001, the militia raided Aweil East County. In 2002, the militia also joined Paulino Matip Nhial, who fought on the side of the government between 1998 and 2003, in forcibly removing civilians from the Block 5A oil concession area, and assisting in clearances from other oil blocks.

The Muraheleen role diminished after the 2005 Comprehensive Peace Agreement, which aimed to end the civil war.

== See also ==
- Army of Peace – Sudanese militia
- Tajammu al-Arabi – Sudanese Arab tribal militia
- Islamic Legion – Former Libyan paramilitary
