= Khartoum 3 =

Neighbourhood in Sudan

Khartoum 3 الخرطوم 3
- Neighbourhood
- Location in Sudan
- Coordinates: 15°35′13.92″N 32°31′39.72″E
- Country: Sudan
- State: Khartoum
- City: Khartoum
- Time zone: Central Africa Time, GMT + 2

Khartoum 3 (Arabic: الخرطوم 3) is an affluent neighbourhood located in Khartoum, the capital city of Sudan. It is bounded to the east by Africa Street leading to Khartoum International Airport, to the west by Khartoum 2 and to the south by Al-Amarat neighbourhood, on the side of Street (1) and to the north by Khartoum in general.

The area host the Khartoum National Club which was founded in 1950.
