= Battle of El Geteina =

Battle during the Third Sudanese civil war

- Part of the Sudanese civil war (2023–present)
Date	22 December 2023 - 25 February 2025.
Location	El Geteina, Sudan
Result	SAF victory
Territorial changes	RSF withdrawal from White Nile State.

Belligerents
Sudanese Armed Forces	Rapid Support Forces

Units involved
18th Infantry Division	Unknown

The Battle of El Geteina, or the Battle of Al Qutanyah was a battle to take control of the town El Geteina in the northern section of White Nile State.

== Background ==
On 15 April 2023, conflict broke out between the Rapid Support Forces (RSF), and the Sudanese Armed Forces (SAF). Sight of conflict has been across half of Sudan through 2023. White Nile State has been safe throughout most of the first year of the war. However, during the fall of SAF positions in Jebel Awliya. The RSF started its incursions into Northern White Nile State.

== First battle and RSF control (2023-2025) ==
Fighting in the town began on 19 December. The RSF were seen being filmed giving a speech, praising God is Great. On 22 December, RSF consolidated control of the town of El-Geteina. The RSF filmed videos of themselves at a captured SAF outpost inside the town. According to military sources, SAF withdrew from El-Geteina and joined the force in the Al-Awwj Area.

On 14 January 2024, the SAF conducted an airstrike in El Geteina for the first time. The SAF targeted the camp of martyr Issa Bishara, a location the SAF used to control.

On 3 June 2024, the SAF launched airstrikes on RSF sites, bombing vehicles and military equipment in the Al-Alaga area, and surrounding villages, along with several RSF positions being bombed and four bases being targeted in El Geteina.

On 15-17 February 2025, the RSF massacred civilians in Al-Kadaris and Al-Khelwat areas in the town. A survivor reported that the RSF came and shot everyone in their view, including those who tried to escape across the Nile River. The Emergency Lawyers claimed that fatalities were around 200. While the SAF claimed that the minimum fatalities was 433.

== Second battle ==
On 24 February, the SAF recaptured the town. Nabil Abdullah, reported that "The heroes of White Nile were also able to destroy the gangs of Al Daglo militia and successfully purify El Geteina," effectively ending RSF's reign over El Geteina after controlling it for a year.
