= Umm Keddada =

Umm Keddada ام كدادة
- Town
- Location of Umm Keddada in Sudan
- Coordinates: 13°35′47″N 26°41′18″E
- Country: Sudan
- State: North Darfur
- Control: Rapid Support Forces
- Time zone: UTC+2 (CAT)

Umm Keddada (Arabic: ام كدادة) is a city in North Darfur, Sudan located 700 km west of Khartoum, the capital of the country.

== History ==
During the Sudanese civil war (2023–present), on 8 November 2023, the Rapid Support Forces captured the Sudanese Army base in Umm Keddada after the army withdrew. The RSF took control over the town on 10 April 2025.

== See also ==
- List of cities in Sudan
