= Khartoum 2 =

Neighbourhood in Sudan

Khartoum 2 الخرطوم 2
- Neighbourhood
- Location in Sudan
- Coordinates: 15°35′25″N 32°32′19″E
- Country: Sudan
- State: Khartoum
- City: Khartoum
- Time zone: Central Africa Time, GMT + 3

Khartoum 2 (Arabic: الخرطوم 2 //) is an affluent neighbourhood located in Khartoum, the capital city of Sudan. It is bounded to the east by Africa Street leading to Khartoum International Airport, to the west by Khartoum 3 and to the south by Al-Amarat neighbourhood, on the side of Street (1) and to the north by Khartoum in general.

During the initial phase of the 2023 Sudan conflict between the Rapid Support Forces (RSF) and Sudanese Armed Forces (SAF), the RSF was heavily involved in intense battles within Khartoum neighbourhoods such as Al Amarat and Khartoum 2. These areas are in proximity to the city's international airport and are also home to numerous embassies and affluent residents. Additionally, the RSF established checkpoints in upscale districts like al-Riyadh. At these checkpoints, they strategically positioned antiaircraft weaponry in front of residences to target the military aircraft that were flying overhead.

Incidents of theft have also been documented within sections of the city proper. On a specific day, individuals living in the Khartoum 2 vicinity informed the BBC that members of the RSF militia had been systematically visiting homes in the neighbourhood, requesting provisions of water and nourishment. On 19 April, a huge fire broke out in the Khartoum 2 area after an attack at a weapons store.
