= Krinding massacre =

Massacre in Sudan

January 2021 Krinding massacre
- Part of Ethnic conflict in West Darfur
- Location: Krinding IDP camp, El Geneina, West Darfur, Sudan
- Date: January 16–17, 2021
- Target: Masalit civilians and self-defense groups
- Deaths: 163
- Injuries: 300+
- Perpetrators: Janjaweed, Rapid Support Forces, and Mahameed Arab civilians
- Motive: Reprisal for the killing of an Arab man

On January 16, 2021, a massacre against Masalit civilians in Krinding IDP camp in Geneina, Sudan by Arab Janjaweed militants killed 163 people, mostly men, and injured 217 others. The massacre was the deadliest attack against Masalit in Geneina since attacks in 2019 against the Krinding camp that killed 72. The attack was also the first event in Krinding where Masalit self-defense groups fought back against Janjaweed.

== Background ==
In mid-2020, the Juba Peace Agreement was signed between the Sudanese government and various rebel groups in Juba, South Sudan. The goal of the peace agreement was to end the War in Darfur and the systemic massacres against non-Arab groups in the region. The city of El Geneina, the capital of West Darfur, had been a flashpoint between Arabs and Masalit as the city was the home of the Masalit Sultanate, and many Arabs had migrated to the area in the decades prior. When the war in Darfur broke out after non-Arab groups disgruntled with the reign of Omar al-Bashir rebelled against the government, Bashir recruited Arab militias into the Janjaweed, which committed genocide against various non-Arab groups in Darfur. In 2013, many Janjaweed were recruited into the Rapid Support Forces (RSF), a government-backed paramilitary led by Rizeigat Arab Hemedti.

The Juba Peace Agreement facilitated the withdrawal of UNAMID, and allowed Sudanese Army and RSF bases to pop up in Geneina. In 2019, the first attack by Janjaweed and the RSF took place against the Masalit in the Krinding camp of Geneina, and killed 72 people, mostly Masalit.

== Attack ==
According to the Darfur Bar Association, the attacks were instigated by the stabbing of an Arab man named Abusim Hammad near Krinding on January 15. The perpetrator was quickly arrested, and the governor of West Darfur instated a curfew. The curfew allowed the Sudanese government to use lethal force to protect people and property, and the Sudanese army (SAF) also dispatched more forces to El Geneina.

A resident of Krinding told Amnesty International that he was beat by several armed men, some wearing uniforms of the RSF, Chadian Army, and civilian clothing, and they arrived in Krinding on camels, horses, motorcycles, and RSF trucks on the morning of January 16. Another resident stated that they were surprised by the entrance of the Janjaweed into the camps, and that they had burnt the market and set fire to homes as civilians fled. The attackers also shot at the fleeing civilians. Satellite imagery showed much of Krinding in flames. The United Nations stated that Masalit men had taken up arms to defend Krinding, and that many of the attackers were Mahameed Arabs.

The next day, the Sudanese interim government held a National Security Committee meeting and dispatched more troops to Geneina to quell the violence. Sudanese state television said that a third of the Krinding camp was burnt to ashes. The Minister of Cabinet Affairs visited El Geneina on January 18 alongside the attorney general and other members of the cabinet. On January 19, the Sudanese Ministry of Foreign Affairs condemned the violence. In a statement that same day, RSF commander Hemedti stated the events were caused by "instigators" on social media of trying to spread chaos.

== Aftermath ==
Most of the victims killed in the Krinding massacre were ethnic Masalit men, along with three women and twelve children. 163 people were killed in total, over 300 were injured, and nearly 149,000 more were displaced from the area due to the massacre. Another 8,981 people lost their belongings or livestock in the attacks. Of the displaced people, 84,000 were displaced within El Geneina, and 64,000 were displaced elsewhere in Sudan. 3,500 others were displaced to Chad. Many of the displaced people were from Krinding 1 and 2 camps, which suffered the brunt of the massacre, and the Sultan House area of Geneina.

Following the attacks, Arabs held a sit-in to block the roads leading into and out of El Geneina to demand the removal of IDP camps and more humanitarian assistance in the area. The protests were relieved on February 7. While the vast majority of the violence occurred on January 16 and into January 17, Arab and Masalit groups signed a peace deal on February 13.

== See also ==
- List of massacres in Sudan
