= Deim Elias =

Village in Sudan

Deim Elias ديم الياس
- Village
- Location in Sudan
- Coordinates: 14°54′27.6″N 33°16′20.8″E
- Country: Sudan
- State: Gezira State
- Time zone: UTC+2 (CAT)

Deim Elias (English: Camp of Elias) is a village in Gezira State, Sudan.

== History ==
In October 2024, the village was affected by statewide massacres. At least two people were killed in the village.
