= Ed Daein Airport =

Airport in East Darfur, Sudan

- IATA: ADV; ICAO: HSDI

Summary
- Serves: Ed Daein, East Darfur, Sudan
- Location: Sudan
- Elevation AMSL: 1,627 ft / 496 m
- Coordinates: 11°24′13″N 026°07′09″E

Map
- Location of the airport in Sudan

Runways
Direction	Length		Surface
Direction	m	ft	Surface
	1,000	3,281
- Sources: GCM, STV

Ed Daein Airport, also known as El Daein Airport (IATA: ADV, ICAO: HSDI) is an airport serving the city of Ed Daein, the capital of the East Darfur state of Sudan. It is located 7 kilometres (4.3 mi) south of the city.

== History ==
In 2014, the Sudanese Ministry of Defence signed a contract with Khartoum Airports Holding to build and upgrade airports in Central and East Darfur, with Ed Daein Airport as being one of the locations included. $25m US dollars was allocated for the airport, alongside Zalingei Airport.

During early November 2023, the Rapid Support Forces seized Ed Daein Airport, and also published recordings of their seizure of the airport.
