= Battle of Ed Daein =

- Part of Sudanese civil war (2023–present)
| Date | November 20–21, 2023 |
| Location | Ed Daein, East Darfur, Sudan |
| Result | RSF victory |
| Territorial changes | Ed Daein and all of East Darfur fall under RSF control |

Belligerents
| Sudanese Armed Forces | Rapid Support Forces; Janjaweed |

Commanders and leaders
| Brig. Gen. Hassan Saleh Nahar (surrendered) | Mohamed Nagi Obeid |

Units involved
| 20th Division | Unknown |

Casualties and losses
| Dozens killed and injured | Dozens killed and injured |
- 40+ civilians killed, 50+ injured

Between November 20 and 21, 2023, the Rapid Support Forces captured the city of Ed Daein, the capital of East Darfur, Sudan, displacing thousands of civilians. The fall of the city made it the fourth Darfuri capital to fall to the RSF, with El Fasher being the last remaining city in the region under Sudanese government control.

== Background ==
On April 15, 2023, civil war broke out between the Sudanese Armed Forces and the Rapid Support Forces across Sudan, with fighting breaking out in Khartoum, El Obeid, and after a few days in the Darfuri state capitals of Geneina, Zalingei, El Fasher, and Nyala. Ed Daein, the capital of East Darfur, was relatively calm in the first days of the war with the exception of the shooting of four Sudanese soldiers by RSF fighters on April 16. The RSF then freed prisoners in the city's jail on April 25. As the war went on, Ed Daein became increasingly constricted from the outside world, with six newborns dying in June due to a lack of supplies at the Ed Daein teaching hospital. By August, much of East Darfur was unable to receive funds from the government to farm, and Ed Daein was hosting thousands of refugees from Nyala on increasingly-limited hospital supplies. Surgeries from Nyala and other besieged areas in Darfur were sent to Ed Daein for treatment.

Ed Daein is the home of the Sudanese Armed Forces' 20th Division, led by brigadier general Hassan Saleh Nahar. On July 24, the RSF said that 15 officers and 527 soldiers from the 20th Division defected to the RSF. Sudanese army spokesman Nabil Abdallah denied these claims, saying it was one officer and 28 soldiers that defected. An incident in October where the RSF stole an SAF vehicle was resolved peacefully by local Rizeigat tribal leaders. After this incident, the RSF declared full control over East Darfur despite the SAF being present in the city. By November 8, Radio Dabanga said there was no RSF presence in the city.

After the capture of Zalingei in early November, RSF commander Abdelrahim Dagalo said on November 2 that the group's next targets were Nertiti in Central Darfur, Geneina in West Darfur, and Ed Daein. A few days later, an RSF offensive in the western part of East Darfur captured the Zarga Um Hadid in Adila and Shag Omar oilfields. Another oilfield, Jad El Said, was attacked by the RSF but repulsed by SAF auxiliaries. Earlier attempts to capture the oilfields in October sparked tensions between locals and the RSF, with fighting breaking out in Adila between communal militias and the RSF.

== Battle ==
A large force of RSF fighters stationed themselves at Um Waragat in late November, about thirty kilometers west of Ed Daein. On November 17, the RSF surrounded the 20th Division headquarters, located seven miles south of the city, and cut off water. The RSF demanded the soldiers surrender or join them. Most traders had already left the city by November 19, fleeing with their goods and families in fear of impending clashes. The commander of the RSF contingent was Mohamed Nagi Obeid, who had been deployed from the Khartoum front to capture East Darfur.

Fighting broke out for the first time in Ed Daein on November 20. Despite calls by Rizeigat tribal leaders not to, the RSF commander of East Darfur launched an offensive on the city and the 20th Division garrison. Dozens of soldiers were killed and injured in the fighting for the base, which lasted for several hours. RSF fighters managed to capture the Ed Daein airport, and after fierce clashes locals reported seeing RSF fighters and allied Janjaweed militiamen roaming through the streets of Ed Daein. Rizeigat paramount chief Saeed Madibo gave a speech at the city's market pledging to prevent any armed group from capturing it. Madibo's heed came after gunmen were spotted in the markets, which were closed.

Many civilians from neighborhoods close to the 20th Division headquarters fled north to safer areas or out of Ed Daein entirely. By the end of the day on November 20, fighting had largely ended. Brig. Gen. Nahar and his men surrendered to the RSF at 4:00am on November 21, leaving the RSF with full control of all of the base's weapons and vehicles, as well as solidifying RSF control over East Darfur. A spokesman for the RSF proclaimed the victory over the "Burhan forces".

Hours after the capture of the base and city by the RSF on November 21, Sudanese Army warplanes bombed gatherings of RSF fighters near the 20th Division. The bombs hit the base and the nearby Al-Qubba neighborhood. At least 40 civilians celebrating the RSF takeover were killed and another 50 were injured in the bombing.

== Aftermath ==
The city's markets reopened on November 21, and calm was brought back to the city.

The battle was a major victory for the RSF, and intensified pressure on El Fasher and the siege of the city. Ed Daein, as the capital of the Rizeigat tribe, became a major source of conscripts for the RSF until 2026.
