= 2020 Darfur attacks =

Mass shootings in Darfur, Sudan

- Part of the War in Darfur
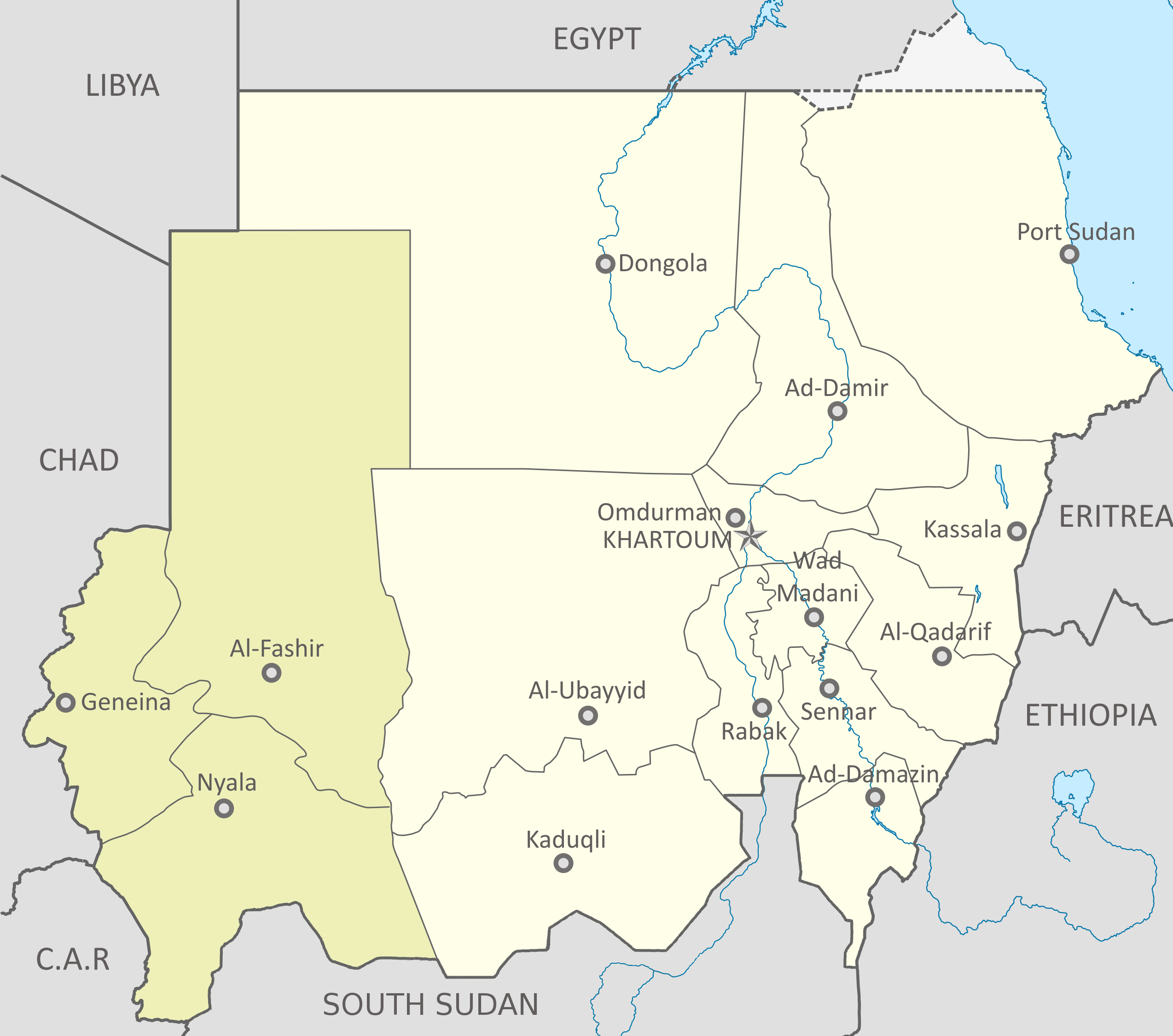
- Location of Darfur (light green) and the rest of Sudan (pale yellow)
- Location: Darfur, Sudan
- Date: 12–26 July 2020
- Attack type: Mass shootings
- Deaths: >89
- Injuries: >102
- Motive: Land conflicts relating to farming rights

The 2020 Darfur attacks were three mass shootings that occurred in July 2020 in Darfur, Sudan. Sudan's leadership and the joint United Nations and African Union mission in Darfur (UNAMID) have connected the massacres to land conflicts relating to farming rights, typically between non-Arab tribal farmers, such as the Masalit people, and Arab Bedouin tribes, whom the government believes to be the attackers.

== Background ==
Since 2003, a civil war has been taking place in Darfur, in the west of Sudan. During the violence, various ethnic groups were driven out of their land. Other people moved in and took over the land; in the 2010s, the original landowners returned and contested ownership.

According to reports by Radio Dabanga:

"The Unregistered Lands Act of 1970 entitled the government to use force in safeguarding land and encouraging the accumulation of land by a minority of rich investors (local or foreign), causing the alienation of agro-pastoralists from their traditional homelands and denying any formal legitimacy or juridical status to traditional property rights."

Farming in the region largely ceased during the conflict, and in early 2020 the Sudanese government intervened to return land to its original owners.

== Attacks ==
=== 12 July: Kutum, North Darfur ===
On 12 July 2020, at least 9 people were killed and 20 injured in an armed attack on protesters carried out by unidentified armed militiamen riding motorbikes, camels and horses in the Fata Borno area of the Kutum locality, in North Darfur. The government, in reaction, decided to impose a state of emergency throughout the state. The witnesses further stated that the militias used light and heavy weapons and looted the town's market, after the withdrawal of the police forces.

=== 24 July: Aboudos, South Darfur ===
On 24 July 2020, gunmen stormed the village of Aboudos in South Darfur, Sudan, according to local tribal leaders. The attack left at least 20 people dead and another 22 were injured. The victims included children, according to Prime Minister Abdalla Hamdok. He connected the violence to farmers in the area returning to their fields, and pledged to send troops to Darfur to "protect citizens and the farming season". These troops would be spread across all of the Darfur region, and consist of both police and military units.

=== 25–26 July: Misterei, West Darfur ===
On 25 and 26 July 2020, another massacre occurred in West Darfur involving around 500 gunmen who attacked Misterei near Beida, a Masalit community, killing more than 60 people. Masteri is a border village with Chad. The United Nations (UN) said that another 60 people were injured in the attack, and that the attackers also looted and burned down villages. A UN statement said it was "one of the latest of a series of security incidents reported over the last week", saying other communities in the region had been destroyed and reporting at least seven deadly attacks in West Darfur since 19 July. The UN have suggested the conflict relates to disputes over land ownership: after displacement in Darfur in the early 2000s, groups took over abandoned land. In recent years, persecuted groups have attempted to return to their land. No group has claimed the attacks.

== See also ==
- List of massacres in Sudan
- 2008 attack on Omdurman and Khartoum
- 2010 South Darfur clash
- 2021 Darfur clashes
