= Tangi and Bir Dagig massacres =

2022 Sudanese massacre

- Location: Tangi and Bir Dagig, Sirba, West Darfur, Sudan
- Date: April 9–10, 2022
- Deaths: 12
- Injuries: 10
- Perpetrator: Unknown gunmen

Between April 9–10, 2022, militiamen riding on camelback attacked the villages of Tangi and Bir Dagig, in West Darfur, Sudan. The massacre killed twelve people, and injured ten more.

== Prelude ==
The Darfur region of Sudan, enveloping four different states, has been embroiled in a civil war and genocide of native non-Arab communities since 2003. Most of the violence had simmered down by the late 2010s and early 2020s, but sporadic clashes and killings continued into early 2022. In March 2022, conflict escalated in South Darfur, as clashes between the Rizeigat and Rapid Support Forces killed dozens of people.

== Massacres ==
Little is known about the direct prelude to the massacre. The attack began on April 9, when gunmen on camel and horseback raided the village of Tangi, where an unknown number of people were killed. The following day, the same gunmen raided the village of Bir Dagig. Twelve civilians were killed in both towns in total, and ten people were injured. The militiamen also stole cattle and other property of the villagers.

== Aftermath ==
Clashes erupted in West Darfur later in the month between the Rapid Support Forces against Masalit tribesmen in Kreinik refugee camp, killing over 200 people. The attack took place in retribution for the killing of two Massalit tribesmen.

== See also ==
- List of massacres in Sudan
