= Sudanese Jihad of 1992 =

The Sudanese Jihad of 1992 was declared at the behest of the Sudanese government by Islamic clerics from the Kordofan region against the Nuba ethnicity rebelling in the region.

== History ==
From the mid-1980s, a faction of the Nuba, led by Yousif Kuwa, joined the Second Sudanese Civil War on the side of the Sudan People's Liberation Army (SPLA). The government responded by arming local Arab tribes in Kordofan for counterinsurgency operations. In 1991, a large-scale military offensive began, aimed at the complete displacement of the Nuba from the Nuba Mountains. The counterinsurgency was marred by humanrights violations such as mass rape, the destruction of villages, and enforced disappearances. The declaration of jihad was intended to justify and support this campaign.

The jihad was declared in El Obeid in March and April 1992, following several meetings between government and military representatives and local tribal leaders and clerics. Six ulama issued a corresponding fatwa. The jihad against the Nuba, although the Nuba had been predominantly Muslim themselves since the 1980s. The jihad was justified on the grounds that Muslim Nuba who joined the rebels were guilty of apostasy. Several clerics from Kordofan had refused to participate in this fatwa.

The governor of Kordofan and his commissioner for South Kordofan were key figures in the effort. President Omar al-Bashir attended the closing ceremony and assumed the title of Imam al-Jihad. Hassan al-Turabi, however, avoided publicly endorsing this jihad, although he supported it ideologically.

From 1993 onward, the military campaign against the Nuba lessened in intensity, and the goal of relocating all Nuba was abandoned. This was largely due to the strong resistance of the SPLA rebels. Furthermore, disagreements within the government and army arose as to whether the objective should be the eradication of the Nuba's cultural identity or simply a military victory over the SPLA. Ultimately, the focus shifted to fighting the SPLA. The attitude of the population in the cities of North Kordofan, who were prevented by state security forces from assisting relocated Nuba, also played a role. The serious human rights violations against the Nuba became internationally known in 1995. The Bürgenstock Agreement in 2002 largely ended the war in the Nuba Mountains.

== Bibliography ==
- De Waal, Alex. "Averting Genocide in the Nuba Mountains, Sudan". howgenocidesend.ssrc.org. Archived from the original on 7 February 2007.
- Hesse, Gerhard (2002). Die Jallaba und die Nuba Nordkordofans: Händler, soziale Distinktion und Sudanisierung. Münster: Lit. ISBN 3825858901.
