= Al-Kadaris and Al-Khelwat massacres =

2025 event in the Sudanese civil war

- Part of Sudanese civil war (2023–present)
- Location: al-Kadaris and al-Khelwat, El Geteina, White Nile State, Sudan
- Date: 15–17 February 2025
- Target: Civilians
- Deaths: 200+ (per Emergency Lawyers); 433+ (per SAF)
- Perpetrator: Rapid Support Forces

Between 14 and 17 February, 2025, militants from the Rapid Support Forces attacked the villages of Al-Kadaris and Al-Khelwat, both in El Geteina, White Nile State, Sudan, killing between 200 to upwards of 433 civilians.

== Background ==
The war in Sudan began on 15 April 2023, after the paramilitary Rapid Support Forces (RSF) attempted to overthrow the Sudanese government led by Abdel Fattah al-Burhan. The coup attempt plunged the Sudanese capital Khartoum and other major cities across the country, including Nyala and El-Obeid, into grueling urban warfare. During the RSF's offensives in Sennar State and Gezira State, the group systematically massacred villages along the Nile River, killing scores of people in the Wad An Nora massacre and the Galgani massacre.

In early February 2024, the Sudanese Army (SAF) went on an offensive and captured large parts of Bahri, a northern city part of Khartoum. RSF forces retreated along the Nile into White Nile state. In that area, the SAF had no presence. In the days leading up to the attacks in Kadaris and Khelwat, the RSF killed five people and injured five others in El Kirel, north of Geteina.

== Massacres ==
Prior to the massacres, the RSF had withdrawn from Gezira state from the SAF offensive towards Geteina and Kirel, before retreating further towards Jabal Awliya south of Khartoum. They then returned to White Nile, where they committed the atrocities. A statement by Emergency Lawyers, a Sudanese rights organization, stated that the attacks occurred for three days ending on 17 February in al-Kadaris and al-Khelwat. A survivor speaking to Reuters stated that on an attack on 17 February, the RSF barged into the village and shot at everyone, including those who tried to flee across the Nile. Local health centers were overwhelmed by the influx of wounded, and photos showed a long caravan of refugees fleeing the villages. Emergency Lawyers called the event a "genocide", and stated around 200 people were killed. An SAF statement said that at least 433 people were killed in the massacres.
