= Kreinik massacre =

Massacre in Darfur

- Part of Aftermath of the War in Darfur
- Location: Kreinik and surrounding villages, West Darfur, Sudan; Geneina, West Darfur (April 25 only)
- Date: April 21-25, 2022
- Deaths: 200+ killed (Kreinik); 10 killed (Geneina)
- Injuries: 88+ injured
- Perpetrators: Janjaweed; Rapid Support Forces

Beginning on April 21, 2022, clashes broke out between Janjaweed and Masalit civilians in the Kreinik refugee camp near El Geneina, West Darfur. These led to massacres over the following days by Janjaweed and the Rapid Support Forces, with hundreds of civilians killed.

== Prelude ==
Kreinik is a town near the West Darfuri capital of El Geneina. During the War in Darfur, it served as a refugee camp for Masalit civilians who fled massacres by the Arab Janjaweed militias. Following the Sudanese revolution in 2019, new governors were appointed to different regions, with Khamis Abakar, former leader of the predominantly-Masalit Sudanese Alliance, appointed governor of West Darfur. In 2021, clashes broke out in Kreinik between the Janjaweed and Masalit, killing 88 people, with 84 others injured. On December 6, 2021, a refugee camp in Kreinik was burnt to the ground by a second Janjaweed attack.

== Clashes ==
The first clashes in Kreinik broke out on April 21, 2022, after the death of two Arab men by unknown assailants. In response, Rizeigat Arab militants along with fighters from the Rapid Support Forces attacked Masalit civilians in Kreinik. The first attack occurred in the town square, killing nine on April 22. The next attack occurred on April 23, killing sixteen and forcing 86,700 to flee to the Sudanese Army headquarters in the town. Janjaweed and RSF then attacked 25 neighboring villages around Kreinik, all predominantly Masalit. Survivors of the attacks stated that their villages were completely razed, and many of the refugees fled to Geneina.

The main attack in Kreinik occurred on April 24, with over 1,000 Janjaweed and RSF fighters heeding the "fazaa", or call to battle. Initially, Sudanese Alliance fighters fought the RSF, but were quickly overrun. The fighters attacked many places in Kreinik, including schools, houses, and the Kreinik hospital. The attack lasted six hours, and the wounded were unable to be transported to the Geneina hospital, as the Janjaweed controlled the roads leading to Geneina. Worshippers leaving the mosque in Kreinik were also shot at. The sultan of Dar Masalit, the Darfur tribe of Masalit, accused the Sudanese Army of fleeing the clashes after only fighting for three minutes. Many civilians from the neighboring towns fled to Kreinik from the violence, seeing the population go from around 25,000 to 125,000.

In an attack on Kreinik the next day, eight people were killed.

On April 25, the clashes spread to Geneina. Residents reported gunshots in several neighborhoods, and doctors' organizations gave a provisional death toll of ten civilians killed. Janjaweed attacked the Geneina Teaching Hospital in the April 25 attack. One French worker for Médecins Sans Frontières was killed.

== Aftermath ==
In the immediate aftermath, over 168 civilians were killed and 98 others were injured. Other estimates put the toll at between 165 and 200 civilians killed, including 21 children. By February 2023, MSF stated that the death toll of the attack was over 200 civilians killed, including two MSF aid workers and eight patients. Survivors of the attack alleged that the Janjaweed and RSF were the perpetrators, and accused the Sudanese Army for letting the attack happen. Following the attacks, many wounded civilians were transported to the El Geneina hospital, although the hospital was full. In Kreinik, food insecurity was also ravaging the town following the influx in refugees along with the Janjaweed and RSF burning down the market and stealing the food during the attack. Khamis Abakar also survived an assassination attempt by the Janjaweed on April 28.

Despite Masalit self-defense groups regaining control over the neighborhoods of Kreinik and El Geneina, the roads were still controlled by the Janjaweed and RSF by May. By February 2023, Kreinik was "a burned-out spectre", as much of the population was living in refugee camps and many neighborhoods were burnt down. The hospital was rebuilt by MSF in December 2022.

=== Reactions ===
Hemedti, leader of the RSF, expressed his condolences and accused both sides of being at fault. Sudanese minister of defense Yassin Ibrahim Yassin claimed to have sent reinforcements to West Darfur.

== See also ==
- List of massacres in Sudan
