= Umm Bel =

Umm Bel أم بل
- Town
- Location in Sudan
- Coordinates: 13°32′N 28°04′E
- Country: Sudan
- State: North Kurdufan

Umm Bel (Arabic: أم بل) is a town in North Kurdufan State in central Sudan, about 170 kilometres west of El Obeid, and north of En Nahud. Acacia tortilis grows in the vicinity.
