= Kreinik =

Town in West Darfur, Sudan

Kreinik كرينك
- Location in Sudan
- Coordinates: 13°22′00″N 22°53′00″E
- Country: Sudan
- State: West Darfur
- Control: Rapid Support Forces
- Elevation: 801 m (2,628 ft)

Population
  - Estimate (2023): 480,000
- Time zone: UTC+2 (Central Africa Time)

Kreinik (Arabic: كرينك), or Al Kuraynik or Kereneik, is a town in West Darfur, Sudan, located 50 miles (80 km) east of Geneina.

== History ==
Kreinik has been the site of inter-communal conflict, with clashes between Arab nomads and the Masalit tribe, and massacres committed against the Masalit people. The conflict has led to civilian casualties and displacement.

During the War in Darfur, it served as a refugee camp for Masalit civilians who fled massacres by the Arab Janjaweed militias. In 2012, armed militias seized farms in the town. Following the 2021 Darfur clashes, many refugees from Kreinik fled and settled in Foro Baranga.

In December 2021, dozens were killed in tribal clashes. On 24 April 2022, a thousand militants murdered more than 200 people in the Kreinik massacre, while the town was torched including the town's hospital. A Médecins Sans Frontières team returned to Kreinik in December 2022 to rebuild the destroyed hospital.

During the 2023 War in Sudan between the Rapid Support Forces (RSF) and the Sudanese Armed Forces (SAF), the town has been under control of the RSF, as has most of West Darfur. In November 2023, the RSF in Kereneik, imposed a ban on civilians crossing into Chad, citing the restoration of regional security. Violators faced hefty fines. This followed widespread violence against civilians, with accusations against the RSF of fuelling violence and committing war crimes in West Darfur. The RSF and allied Arab militias imposed exorbitant penalties on those transporting civilians to Chad. Since then, the area has been isolated since 2023, with the main supply route closed off by the Sudanese Armed Forces. This has made it difficult for humanitarian aid to reach the area. Despite the challenges, aid agencies have been working to provide support, including food, shelter, and medical assistance.

== Demographics ==
Kreinik is inhabited mostly by the Masalit, the biggest ethnic group in West Darfur. It became home to many displaced ethnic black Masalit communities in the 2000s and the 2010s.
