= Safita al-Ghunomab =

Village in Sudan

- Village
- Country: Sudan
- State: Gezira
- Time zone: UTC+2 (CAT)

Safita al-Ghunomab is a village in Gezira State, Sudan.

== History ==
The RSF killed dozens of civilians in the village in a campaign of statewide massacres in October 2024.
