= Bor massacre =

Massacre in South Sudan

- Part of Second Sudanese Civil War and Ethnic violence in South Sudan
- Location: Bor County, Sudan (now South Sudan)
- Date: November 15, 1991
- Target: Dinka people
- Deaths: 5,000 to 20,000
- Victims: 25,000 more died from famine as a result of the massacre
- Perpetrators: Riek Machar's SPLA-Nasir; Nuer fighters

The Bor massacre was a massacre of an estimated 5,000 to 20,000 civilians in Bor on November 15, 1991 during the Second Sudanese Civil War. The massacre was carried out mostly by Nuer fighters from SPLA-Nasir, led by Riek Machar, and the militant group known as the Nuer White Army, shortly after Machar split off from the SPLA led by John Garang. Amnesty International said at least 5,000 Dinka were killed, though the real number may have been higher. In the years which followed, an estimated 25,000 more died from famine as their cattle were either stolen or shot and the fighting had displaced them from the land they had once cultivated. At the time, Riek Machar described the incident as "propaganda" and "myth". In 2012, he publicly apologized for his part in the massacre.

== See also ==
- List of massacres in Sudan
- Second Sudanese Civil War
- Pibor massacre
- 2014 Bentiu massacre
