= Saqiaah =

Village in Sudan

- Country: Sudan
- State: Al Jazirah
- Time zone: UTC+2 (CAT)

Saqiaah is a village in Gezira State, Sudan.

== History ==
In October 2024, the village was affected by statewide massacres. At least 12 people were killed.
