= Pibor massacre =

Massacre in South Sudan

- Part of Ethnic violence in South Sudan
- Location: Pibor County, South Sudan
- Date: December 23, 2011 - January 4, 2012
- Target: Murle people
- Deaths: ~900 (per UNMISS); 3,171 (per Konyi)
- Victim: 1,293 children abducted
- Perpetrator: Nuer White Army

The Pibor massacre occurred in Pibor County, South Sudan from 23 December 2011 to 4 January 2012. The fighting was between the Murle and the Lou Nuer, mostly over raiding cattle and abducting children to raise as their own. The Nuer White Army released a statement stating its intention to "wipe out the entire Murle tribe on the face of the earth as the only solution to guarantee long-term security of Nuer’s cattle". A report by the United Nations Mission in South Sudan estimated that about 900 were killed. Joshua Konyi, the commissioner of Pibor County and a Murle, estimated that 2,182 women and children and 959 men were killed, 1,293 children were abducted and 375,186 cows were stolen.

== See also ==
- Bor massacre
- 2014 Bentiu massacre
