= Al Amarat, Khartoum =

Urban district in Khartoum, Sudan

Al Amarat العمارات
- Neighbourhood

Arabic transcription(s)
  - Common: العمارات
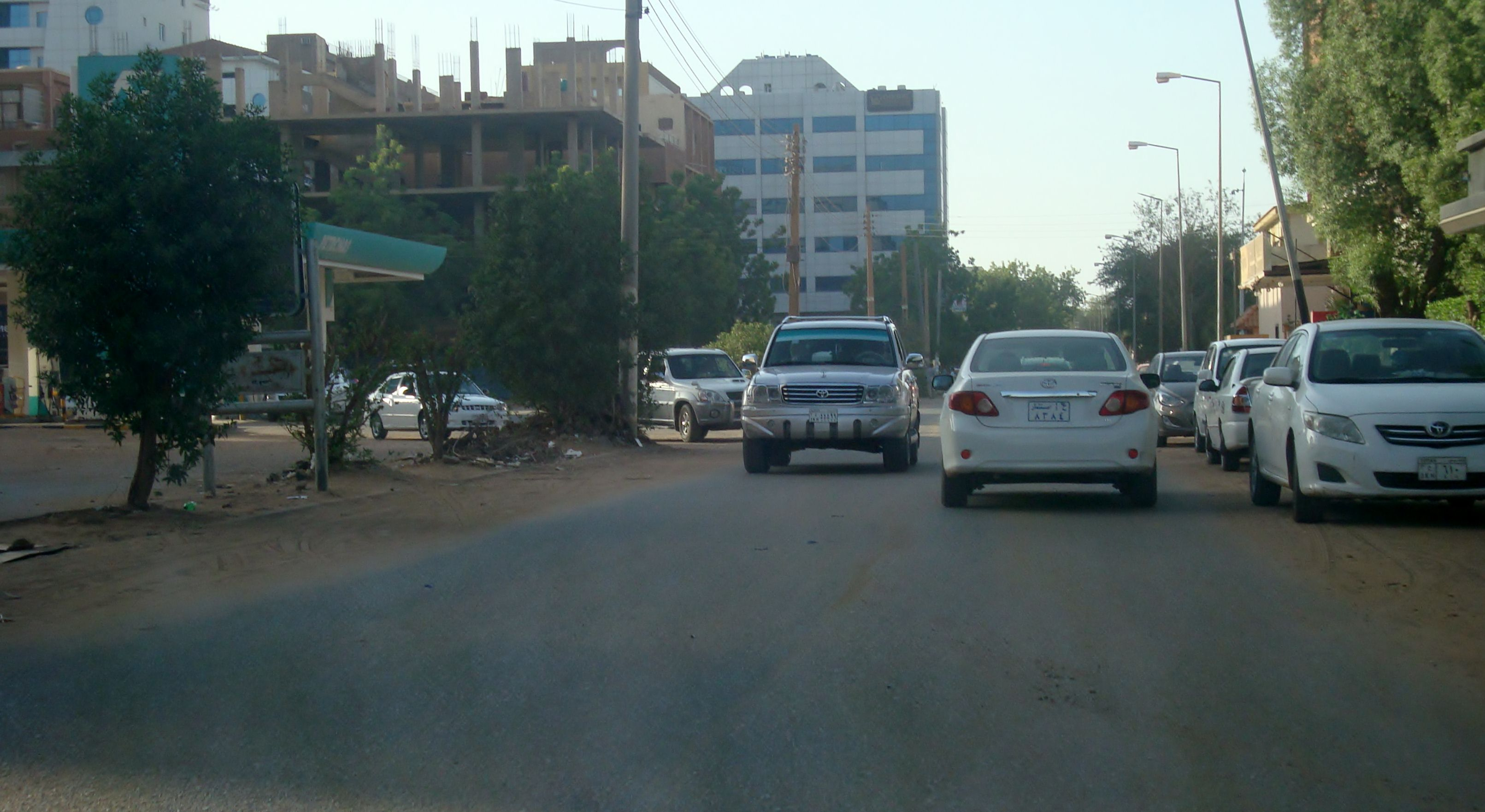
- Street in Al Amarat, Khartoum

- Location of Al Amarat in Sudan
- Coordinates: 15°39′N 32°29′E
- Country: Sudan
- State: Khartoum
- Time zone: UTC+3 (East Africa Time)
  - Summer (DST): UTC+3

Al Amarat (Arabic: العمارات / transliterated: al 'amarāt) is a large district and one of the most prestigious neighbourhoods in Khartoum city.

== Geography ==
Al Amarat is bounded on the East by Africa or (Airport) road and on the West by Mohamed Naguib road. The numbers of the neighbourhood streets start with 1st street and end with 61st street, using odd numbers only.

== History ==
The district is a modern residential district in Khartoum and was founded under the government of the former president Ibrahim Abboud in the early 1960s. Al Amarat district is known as a major residential area of the section called Khartoum 2.

The neighbourhood was named Al Amarat, as it was the first district in Khartoum with high-rise buildings, and was originally called "South Amarat". It was planned for both first class and second class buildings.

== Climate ==
Just like Khartoum, the Al Amarat district features a hot semi-arid climate (Köppen climate classification BSh) with a dry season occurring during November to March. This is typical for the Saharo-Sahelian zone, which marks the progressive passage between the Sahara's vast desert areas and the Sahel's vast semi-arid areas. The climate is extremely dry for most of the year, with about nine months, where average rainfall is lower than 5 mm (0.20 in). The very long dry season is itself divided into a hot, very dry season between November and March as well as a very hot, dry season between April and June.

== Social character of Al Amarat ==
Al Amarat is one of the earlier prestigious neighbourhoods in Khartoum, considering its buildings, including modern shops, embassies and the Arab Bank for Economic Development in Africa. There are various restaurants, private residences and apartment buildings.

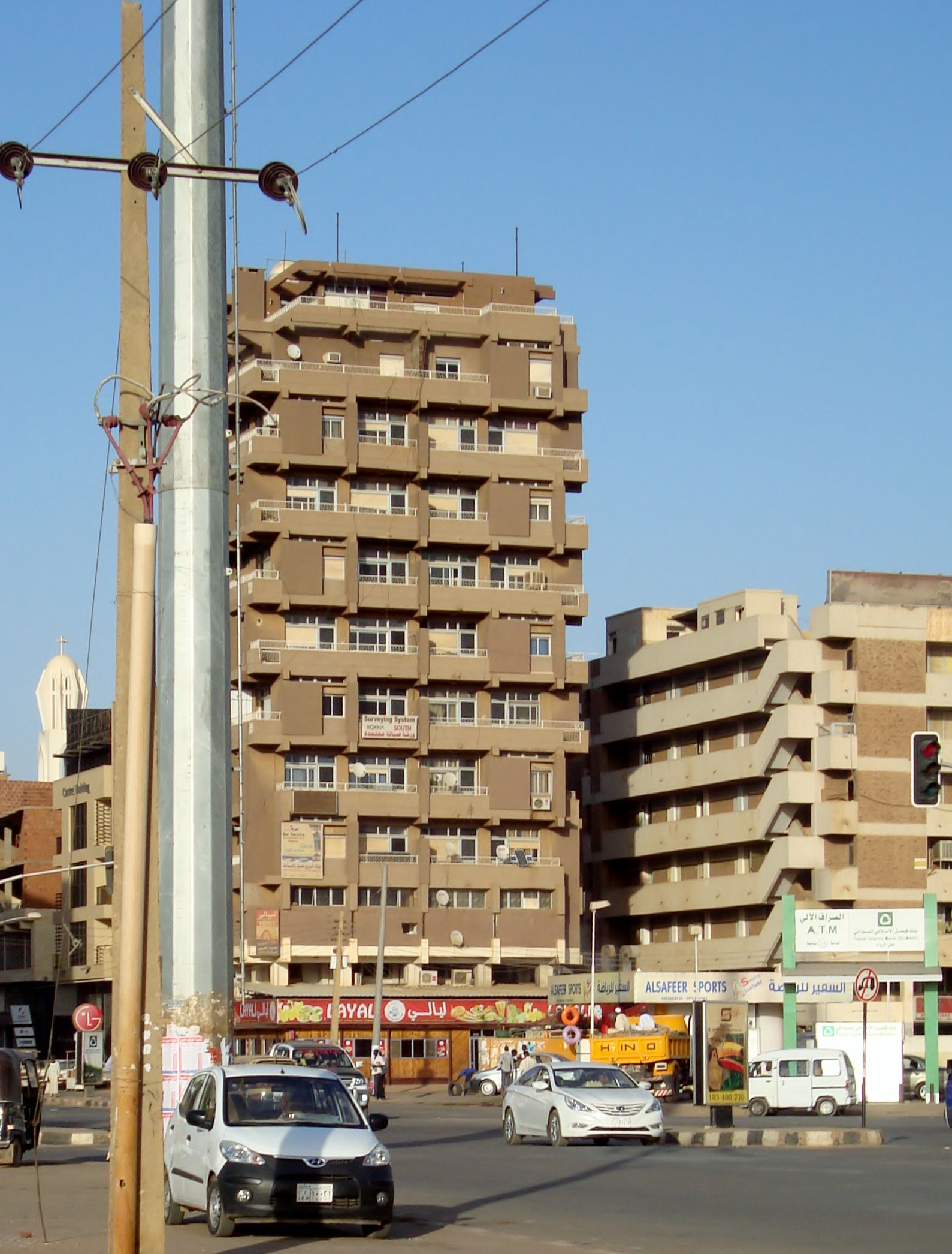
Corner Mohamed Naguib St and 15th St, Al Amarat

== Educational institutions ==
Al Amarat District offers several public or private elementary and secondary schools:

- Khartoum New Secondary School for girls
- Al Amarat Girls Intermediate School
- Al Amarat Elementary School for boys
- Al Amarat Intermediate School for boys
- Hassouna Secondary School for boys
- American School Khartoum

== Notable persons who lived in Al Amarat ==
Ibrahim Abboud was a Sudanese president, general, and political figure. A career soldier, Abboud served in World War II in Egypt and Iraq. In 1949, Abboud became the deputy Commander in Chief of the Sudanese military. Upon independence, Abboud became the Commander in Chief of the Military of Sudan. He served as the head of state of Sudan between 1958 and 1964 and as president of Sudan in 1964; however, he soon resigned, ending Sudan's first period of military rule.
