= Al-Rai Al-Aam =

Sudanese newspaper

Al-Rayaam الرأي العام
- Type: Daily newspaper
- Format: Broadsheet
- Publisher: Ali Ismail Al Atabani
- Editor: Kamal Hassan Bakhiet
- Founded: March 15, 1945
- Political alignment: Independent
- Language: Arabic
- Headquarters: Khartoum
- Price: SDG 0.50 Sudan; SAR 2 Saudi Arabia
- Website: www.Rayaam.info

Al-Rayaam (also transliterated as Al-Rae Al-Aam, Al-Rai Al-Aam, and Al-Ra'y al-Amm) (Arabic: الرأي العام meaning Public Opinion) is the oldest newspaper in Sudan. It was founded on March 15, 1945, by Ismail Al Atabani. As of 2011, it had a daily circulation of about 18,000.

It is an Islamist paper and had strong links to the government of Omar al-Bashir, but also employed columnists who were anti-government.
