= El Geteina =

El Geteina القطنية Al Qutaynah
- town
- Location in Sudan
- Coordinates: 14°51′40.4″N 32°22′9.1″E
- Country: Sudan
- Admin. division: White Nile

Population (2008)
  - Total: 26,893
- Area codes: 0 (532) 821XXX, +249 (532) 821XXX, 0 (532) 822XXX

El Geteina ( also Al Qutaynah, Arabic: القطينة) is a small town located in the state of the White Nile in Sudan. The town is placed just a little bit upstream of the lake formed by the White Nile Dam.

== Sudanese civil war (2023–present) ==
On December 22, 2023, the RSF captured the city. Al Qutaynah was the first city in White Nile to fall to the RSF.

On February 15 and 17, 2025, the RSF massacred 200-500 people in the town.

On 23 February 2025, the Sudanese army recaptured the city.
