= Bentiu massacre =

2014 mass killing of civilians during the South Sudanese Civil War

- Part of the South Sudanese Civil War, and ethnic violence in South Sudan
- Location: 9.2350°N 29.8058°E; Bentiu, South Sudan
- Date: 15 April 2014; 12 years ago
- Deaths: 200-400+
- Victims: Sudanese people (Darfuri traders, suspected JEM fighters), Dinka people (local civilians, SPLA soldiers)
- Perpetrator: SPLM/A-IO (denied)

The Bentiu massacre occurred on 15 April 2014 in the town of Bentiu, in the north of South Sudan, during the South Sudanese Civil War. The attack was described by The Economist as the "worst massacre" of the civil war.

== Prelude ==
Prior to the attack, people had sought refuge in places of worship and healing, while a local radio station featured rebel commanders warning certain ethnic groups, except the Nuers, that they were coming for them, calling on the other groups to rape the non-Nuer women.

== Attack ==
UN human rights investigators said that after rebels wrested Bentiu from government forces in heavy battles, the gunmen spent two days hunting down those who they believed opposed them. The killers, identified by the United Nations as forces of the Nuer-led SPLM/A-IO, went from place to place, from mosque to church to hospital, separating people by ethnicity and religion and shooting the ones left behind. Civilians were killed in the town's main hospital, in a Catholic church and especially in the Kali-Ballee mosque, where hundreds had taken shelter and where the rebels "separated individuals of certain nationalities and ethnic groups and escorted them to safety, while the others were killed," according to a UN report. One of those who only barely escaped death during the massacre was the prominent former warlord and pro-government commander Peter Par Jiek. A week after the attack, bodies still littered the streets.

== Casualties ==
South Sudan's government said the death toll from the massacre exceeded 400. In the main mosque alone, "more than 200 civilians were reportedly killed and over 400 wounded," the UN mission in the country said.

According to a source, many of the victims were Sudanese, in particular traders from Darfur as well as soldiers from the Justice and Equality Movement (JEM), a Sudanese rebel group from Darfur accused of supporting the South Sudanese government. According to the source, JEM fighters removed their uniforms and hid in the mosque, before being shot. However, a Sudanese human rights group rejected this claim, saying those killed were unarmed civilians.

Many other victims were civilians as well as SPLA soldiers belonging to the Dinka people, an ethnic group which had traditionally supported Kiir's government.

== Aftermath ==
Rebel leader Riek Machar said his forces were not behind the killings and rebel spokesman Lul Ruai Koang said, "the government forces and their allies committed these heinous crimes while retreating."

The massacre at Bentiu greatly increased the animosity of Dinkas against ethnic Nuer in Bahr el Ghazal which had previously been largely peaceful and unaffected by the civil war. Families of Dinka soldiers killed at Bentiu attacked a Nuer SPLA soldier at Mapel, Western Bahr el Ghazal, in April 2014, resulting in inter-tribal clashes and the massacre of up to 200 Nuer soldiers by Dinka soldiers. This violence led to the mass desertion of Nuer SPLA members in Bahr el Ghazal who then fled north into Sudan in course of a long march.

== See also ==
- Ethnic violence in South Sudan (2011–present)
- Bor massacre
- Pibor massacre

== Bibliography ==
- The Conflict in Northern and Western Bahrel Ghazal States (PDF). Geneva: Small Arms Survey. 16 October 2014. Archived from the original (PDF) on 7 June 2021.
