= Ghanimah =

Spoils of war in Islamic jurisprudence

In Islam, the spoils of war, also known as ghanimah (Arabic: غَنيمَة, romanized: ġanīma), refer to the wealth or property acquired by Muslims through jihad (warfare) against non-Muslims, including land, wealth, and material possessions like livestock, as well as captives.

== Etymology ==
The term ghanimah is derived from the Arabic root that implies gain or profit, and it encompasses various forms of wealth, including material goods, land, and other resources captured during military campaigns. The concept of ghanimah has its roots in pre-Islamic Bedouin society, where raids (ghazw) were a common practice for acquiring resources.

== Jurisprudence ==
The rules for dividing the spoils date back to the Battle of Badr. The Quran explicitly addresses the distribution of ghanimah in Surah Al-Anfal (Chapter 8), where it is stated that one-fifth of the spoils (known as Khums) belong to Allah and Muhammad, which is then used for community needs and distributed among specific groups such as the Prophet’s relatives, orphans, the poor, and travellers. The remaining four-fifths are divided among the ghazi (warriors) who participated in the battle, with additional shares given to those who fought on horseback.

== History ==
Early Islamic jurisprudence (7th century AD) placed a strong emphasis on the ethical implications of warfare and the treatment of spoils. The classical Islamic legal tradition categorised ghanimah as a form of property that could be legitimately acquired and distributed among the Muslim community, while also laying down rules to ensure that the rights of non-combatants were respected. For instance, the early caliph Umar ibn al-Khattab made decisions regarding the distribution of ghanimah, allowing for the retention of spoils within local populations, even if they were non-believers, provided they adhered to certain conditions, such as the payment of jizyah (a tax levied on non-Muslims).

The captured non-Muslims are distributed as slaves among the Muslim fighters, with women being allowed to be taken as concubines; any marriages of the slaves are annulled. The imam can claim the captured men for himself. He can kill them, release them for ransom, or exchange them for Muslim prisoners. In Abu Hanifa's opinion, they must not be released.

Ghanimah has historically served as a source of revenue for the Islamic state. The Baitul-Maal, or the house of wealth, was established as a financial institution to manage the funds derived from various sources, including zakat (obligatory almsgiving), sadaqah (voluntary charity), and ghanimah. This institution played a crucial role in the economic distribution within the Muslim community, ensuring that the wealth acquired through warfare was utilised for the welfare of society.
