= Al-Sireha =

Village in Sudan

- Country: Sudan
- State: Al Jazirah
- Time zone: UTC+2 (CAT)

Al-Sireha is a village in Gezira State, Sudan.

== History ==
In October 2024, the village was affected by statewide massacres by the Rapid Support Forces. Over 141 people were reported killed in the village.
