= Ed Daein =

City in East Darfur, Sudan

El Daein الضعين
- Location within Sudan
- Coordinates: 11°27′39″N 26°7′42″E
- Country: Sudan
- State: East Darfur
- Control: Rapid Support Forces

Government
  - Type: locality
  - Mayor: Siddigh abdel-Nabi Hassan
- Elevation: 1,473 ft (449 m)

Population (2006)
  - Total: 264,734 (Census)
- Postal code: 63312

Ed Daein (also spelt Ad Du'ayn, Ad Da'en or El Da'ein; Arabic: الضعين) is a city located in southwestern Sudan. It lies about 831 km from the capital Khartoum and has population of about 300,000 people.

Ed Daein is the capital of the state of East Darfur, created in January 2012, and is located at the crossroads of the states of the Darfur region and Khartoum. It is located 157.4 km away from the city of Nyala in South Darfur and 180.6 km from Al Mijlad in South Kordofan.

== History ==
The city was founded by Barsham (Haskanet) bin Abd al-Hamid, and the Rizeigat tribe to which Madibbo bin Ali bin Barsham belonged, settled in the eighteenth and nineteenth centuries AD. The city's history witnessed clashes between it and the rulers and tribes of the neighboring regions, such as the Fur tribe in western Sudan and the Dinka in southern Sudan. The Rizeigat were subservient to the Sultan of Darfur and, on behalf of the Sultan of Fur, fought Zubair Pasha who defeated them twice on his way to conquer Darfur and annex it to the Ottoman Sultanate and their Viceroy in Egypt.

The Rizeigat joined the Mahdist Revolution in Sudan and pledged allegiance to the Mahdi in Mount Qadeer in 1882 AD and their leader, Madibbo, participated in the Shalali battle that the Mahdi led against the soldiers of Turkish-Egyptian rule in the region.

On 27 and 28 March 1987, the city witnessed an ethnic massacre, when armed Rizeigat killed over 1,000 Dinka people.

On 22 November 2023, the city was captured and is currently occupied by the Rapid Support Forces during the ongoing Sudanese civil war.

On 20 March 2026, 70 were killed and 146+ were injured in an attack on el-Daein Teaching Hospital, as reported by the World Health Organization. The Sudanese army denied responsibility.

== Transportation ==
The city is linked by rail to Khartoum in the east and Nyala city to the west and is a centre of local trade in wheat, peanuts, barley and livestock. The city is served by the Ed Daein Airport (IATA: ADV).
