= Bürgenstock Agreement =

The Bürgenstock Agreement was concluded on January 19, 2002, at Bürgenstock mountain in central Switzerland between the parties in the conflict in the secession war in southern Sudan.

In the process, the Sudanese government in Khartoum and the SPLA rebel group signed a provisional ceasefire for the Nuba Mountains. The agreement came about under pressure from the United States and with the help of Switzerland as a mediator, and was seen as a test run for the later peace agreement for South Sudan, the Comprehensive Peace Agreement signed in 2005 in Naivasha, Kenya.

The ceasefire did not hold in the Nuba Mountains in Sudan itself. From 2011, aid organizations were unable to access the area for at least three years. Part of the area was not under government control and was bombed and fought over with ground troops. In 2016, there was a further ground offensive by the Sudanese Armed Forces.

== See also ==
- History of Sudan
- History of South Sudan
