= Tambul =

Village in Sudan

Tambul تمبول
- City
- Location in Sudan
- Coordinates: 14°56′3.8″N 33°25′49.8″E
- Country: Sudan
- State: Gezira State
- Time zone: UTC+2 (CAT)

Tambul is a City in Gezira State, Sudan.

== Third Sudanese Civil War ==
In October 2024, the city was affected by statewide massacres. On 21 October, ten people were killed in an RSF attack on the village. On 22 October, the RSF ambushed SAF troops near Tambul, leading to a withdrawal of the SAF from Tambul during their offensives.

On 13 January 2025, the Sudanese army recaptured Tambul. This comes from an offensive two days before on 11 January when the Sudanese army recaptured the capital, Wad Madani, along with other areas in Gezira State
