= Wad An Nora massacre =

2024 massacre of villagers by the Rapid Support Forces

- Part of War crimes during the Sudanese civil war (2023–present) and Aftermath of the battle of Wad Madani
- Gezira State, Sudan
- Location: 14°30′57″N 32°30′41″E; Wad Al-Noora, Gezira State, Sudan
- Date: 5 June 2024; 05:00 GMT+2 –
- Attack type: Massacre, Looting
- Deaths: 150-200+
- Injuries: 200+
- Perpetrator: Rapid Support Forces
- Defenders: Civilians of Wad Al-Noora, Sudanese Air Force

The Wad Al-Noora massacre started at around 05:00 (GMT+2) on 5 June 2024, when the Rapid Support Forces (RSF) attacked the village of Wad Al-Noora in Al-Jazira state twice, killing at least 100 civilians. The massacre followed after the RSF besieging and opening fire on the village.

== Background ==
Since April 2023, there has been a civil war in Sudan between the two main factions of the country's military government. The conflict involves the internationally recognized government of Sudan led by the Sudanese Armed Forces (SAF), under General Abdel Fattah al-Burhan; against the rival Government of Peace and Unity led by the Rapid Support Forces (RSF) paramilitary group, commanded by General Hemedti (Muhammad Hamdan Dagalo Musa). Smaller armed groups have also taken part on both sides, most notably Sudan Liberation Movement splinter groups, the Tamazuj militia, and the Darfur Joint Protection Force.

Fighting began on 15 April 2023 following a power struggle within the transitional administration established after the 2021 coup. As of 6 July 2026, the conflict has forcibly displaced over 14 million people, with 4.5 million fleeing the country as refugees, making it one of the largest displacement crises in recent history. The conflict has also seen heavy influence from foreign powers, especially Russia, Turkey, Saudi Arabia, Iran, Egypt, Ethiopia and the United Arab Emirates, while also experiencing effects from the spillover of neighboring conflicts in the Central African Republic (CAR), Chad and Libya.

The current war erupted amid tensions regarding the integration of the RSF into the Sudanese Army following the 2021 coup. Initial RSF attacks targeted government sites in the capital, Khartoum, and other cities. The conflict began with the Battle of Khartoum, and fighting then spread to the Darfur region. The capital region was divided between the two factions, and al-Burhan relocated his government to Port Sudan. International efforts, including the 2023 Jeddah Declaration, failed to stop the fighting, while various rebel groups entered the war: the SPLM–North attacked the SAF in the south; the Tamazuj movement joined the RSF; and the SAF gained support from factions of the Sudan Liberation Movement and Justice and Equality Movement.

By late 2023, the RSF controlled most of Darfur and advanced on Khartoum, taking over most of the capital, Kordofan and Gezira. The SAF regained momentum in 2024, making gains in Omdurman and retaking Khartoum by March 2025. Despite negotiations, no lasting ceasefire has been reached, and the war continues with severe humanitarian consequences and regional implications.

The city of El Fasher, the SAF's last stronghold in Darfur, was besieged by the RSF from April 2024. On 26 October 2025, the city fell to the RSF, with the city and neighboring villages suffering what some experts called a genocidal massacre inflicting between 60,000 and 70,000 deaths by one estimate. Satellite estimates have been as high as 150,000 dead, making it the largest massacre of the 21st century.

Sudan faces one of the world's most severe humanitarian crises, with widespread famine and 25 million people suffering severe food insecurity. Four million children are acutely malnourished, including 770,000 at imminent risk of death, and famine has been confirmed in several regions. The country faces extreme shortages of water, medicine and aid access, widespread hospital closures, disease outbreaks, mass displacement, looting of humanitarian supplies, and the near-collapse of education and infrastructure, leaving half the population in urgent need. The total death toll of the war comprises fatalities from violence, starvation and disease; thousands remain missing or were killed in targeted massacres primarily attributed to the RSF and allied militias. 61,000 people have died in Khartoum State alone, of whom 26,000 were direct victims of violence. Sexual violence has been widespread. UN under-secretary for humanitarian affairs Tom Fletcher described Darfur as the "epicenter of human suffering in the world".

There have been calls for more aid, legal protections for humanitarian workers, refugee support and a halt to international arms supplies to the RSF, particularly from the United Arab Emirates (UAE). The US, UK, EU and Canada imposed sanctions on entities linked to both factions for ceasefire violations and human rights abuses. Despite denials, the UAE has been found to violate these sanctions by shipping Chinese weaponry to the RSF, which largely funds its operations through gold exports to the UAE. Many civilians in Darfur have been killed as part of the Masalit genocide. On 7 January 2025, the United States government formally determined that the RSF and its allied militias committed acts of genocide.

== Massacre ==
Civilian Resistance Committees reported that after stationing at Al-Nala office on the outskirts of the village, the RSF documented themselves using heavy shelling, heavy artillery fire, dual cannons, and quadruple cannons on the village. The Sudanese Air Force dispersed the RSF and forced them to retreat to Al-Ashra neighbourhood nearby, looting the village. After this, the RSF mobilized dozens of vehicles and returned to the outskirts of Wad Al-Noora to surround and siege the village. After meeting strong resistance from villagers despite the mismatch in weapon capabilities, the militia entered the village through the hospital. They proceeded to violently loot cars, markets, and homes, cut off network access in the village, spread their forces along the tops of buildings mosques, and randomly targeted citizens with firepower, with most of them being unarmed. No Sudanese Armed Forces reinforcements arrived to the village after the second assault on it started.

== Aftermath ==
Videos shared by the Committees of Madani showed the burial of dozens of citizens in a public square. Among the deceased included Sudan News Agency journalist Makkawi Muhammad Ahmed. Finding the full number of casualties was delayed due to network outages in the village, with preliminary fatality counts gradually moving from 100 deaths to 200 deaths.

Eyewitnesses to the attack claimed that the assailants would execute citizens who were already injured, and would target woman and children. The assault resulted in the forced displacement of all the surviving women and children in the village, many of them taking refuge in Al-Manaqil. Many of the survivors denounced the Sudanese Armed Forces for not sending in any reinforcements to defend the village during the second assault, despite many villagers requesting help.

The Rapid Support Forces justified the massacre on its official "X" account by claiming that the village held enemy Burhan and Mujahideen Brigades and that they were planning to attack their forces in the Jabal Awliya area in Khartoum.

The Mashad Observatory for Human Rights strongly condemned the indiscriminate nature of the attacks and the resulting forced displacement of women and children as war crimes that violated human rights and international law. They called on the international community to speak out against the RSF, intervene to prevent further war crimes, and bring justice to those who were responsible.

The National Umma Party decried the crimes against humanity perpetrated by the RSF, and claimed that the assault represented a continuation of the ethnic cleansing and genocide in Darfur. They warned the international community of the possible consequences of remaining silent and not holding the RSF accountable for their genocidal actions, rape, and forced displacement.

A football field in the village was converted into a cemetery for the victims.

== See also ==
- Al Fasher massacre
- Gezira State canal killings (2024–2025)
