= Galgani massacre =

2024 massacre of villagers by the Rapid Support Forces

- Part of the Sennar offensive and War crimes during the Sudanese civil war (2023–present)
- Location: Galgani, Sennar State, Sudan
- Date: 15 August 2024
- Target: Galgani villagers
- Attack type: Indiscriminate shooting, looting, arson
- Weapons: Automatic rifles, Heavy weapons
- Deaths: 108+, 24+ women and minors
- Injuries: 153+
- Perpetrator: Rapid Support Forces
- Motive: Retaliation for villagers resisting an earlier attack

The Galgani massacre refers to a mass killing of civilians in the central Sudanese village of Galgani by the Rapid Support Forces (RSF) on 15 August 2024, which killed at least 108 people, including at least 24 women and children.

== Background ==
In late June 2024, RSF troops were able to capture Singa, the capital of Sennar State. From there, RSF troops were able to expand control into the eastern regions of the state. Based on reports from the International Organization for Migration, fighting led to the displacement of 725,000 people in Sennar, with Al Qadarif State taking in over 100,000 people.

Beginning in late July, the Rapid Support Forces began to attack the village of Galgani located in the central Sudanese Sennar State. Sudan's Foreign Ministry stated that RSF soldiers “indiscriminately opened fire on the village's unarmed residents” as a result of facing resistance from villagers against their efforts to "abduct and sexually assault" several women civilians and girls.

The Sennar Youth Gathering reported that the RSF targeted Galgani on 11 August, firing indiscriminately at crowds of people as they invaded while ceasing the operations of medical and other service facilities, triggering further mass migrations into the Blue Nile State.

== Massacre ==
On 15 August 2024, hundreds of RSF troops on four-wheel drive vehicles launched a multiple hours long attack, storming Galgani while looting houses and other public properties, after which troops burnt them. The attack came after villagers launched a resistance against the RSF and successfully beat back a small RSF group, killing three militiamen. As a result of the attack, the village's medical center took in at least 80 deceased victims which included 24 women and minors. Among these were several students practicing at Koranic schools. At least 153 civilians were reported to have been injured in the attack. The attack left groups of bodies laying out on streets due to the presence of RSF troops preventing civilians from taking in the dead and burying them. Most of the village's 14,000 inhabitants subsequently fled to Blue Nile State.

== Aftermath ==
The Foreign Ministry of Sudan called on the international community to "condemn this terrorist crime and to take the necessary measures to treat the Dagalo militia as a terrorist organization, responsible for crimes against humanity". The statement was primarily targeted towards the United Nations.
