= Wad An Nora =

Wad An Nora ود النورة
- Location of Wad An Nora in Sudan
- Coordinates: 14°30′57″N 32°30′41″E
- Country: Sudan
- State: Al Jazirah
- Time zone: UTC+2 (CAT)

Wad An Nora (Arabic: ود النورة) is a village in Al Jazirah State, central Sudan. During the Third Sudanese Civil War, Rapid Support Forces backed by UAE killed up to 200 inhabitants.
