= Sudanese peace process =

Attempts to resolve the crisis in Sudan

The Sudanese peace process consists of meetings, written agreements and actions that aim to resolve the War in Darfur, the Sudanese conflict in South Kordofan and Blue Nile (the Two Areas), and armed conflicts in central, northern and eastern Sudan.

In 2005, the Comprehensive Peace Agreement led to a resolution of some of the armed conflict in Sudan, including the 2011 South Sudanese independence referendum and the secession of South Sudan. The 2006 Abuja and 2011 Doha Darfur Peace Agreements aimed to resolve the conflict in Darfur.

The August 2019 Draft Constitutional Declaration, signed by military and civilian representatives during the 2018–19 Sudanese revolution, requires that a peace agreement be made within the first six months of the 39-month transition period to democratic civilian government. A first round of negotiations took place in Juba in mid-September. In the second round in October 2019, agreements were signed on 18 October on the Two Areas track between the government and the Sudan People's Liberation Movement–North (al-Hilu) (SPLM-N (al-Hilu)) and on the Darfur track between the government and the Sudan Revolutionary Front (SRF). The third round started in mid-December on the eastern Sudan track, the Two Areas track with the SPLM-N (Agar), and the Darfur track.

MANSAM and the No to Oppression against Women Initiative called repeatedly for women to be included in the peace process.

== Draft constitutional requirements ==
The 4 August Draft Constitutional Declaration lists "achieving a just and comprehensive peace, ending the war by addressing the roots of the Sudanese problem" as Article 7.(1), the first listed item in its "Mandate of the Transitional Period", and gives details in Chapter 15, Articles 67 and 58 of the document. Article 67.(b) says that a peace agreement should be completed within six months of the signing of the Draft Constitutional Declaration. Article 67.(c) requires women to participate in all levels of the peace procedure and for United Nations Security Council Resolution 1325 to be applied, and legal establishment of women's rights is covered in Article 67.(d). Other mechanisms for implementing the comprehensive peace process are listed in Articles 67.(e) (stopping hostilities, opening humanitarian assistance corridors, prisoner releases and exchanges), 67.(f) (amnesties for political leaders and members of armed opposition movements), and 67.(g) (transitional justice and accountability for crimes against humanity and war crimes and trials in national and international courts). Article 68 lists 13 "essential issues for peace negotiations".

== Conflict incidents ==
During mid-September to mid-November 2019, 40 assaults by Sudanese security forces against civilians took place in Darfur, in which civilians were killed or wounded, in Mershing, Shangil Tobai, Gray Kalakl, Andro, Kadner, Mukjar, Gereida and Krenk. A representative of internally displace people (IDPs) described the security situation as unchanged since the power transfer from the Transitional Military Council to the civilian–military Sovereignty Council and civilian cabinet.

Armed clashes between state security forces and Sudan Liberation Movement/Army (al-Nur; SLM-al-Nur) occurred. As of November 2019, SLM (al-Nur) refused to join the Juba peace process.

== Geographical negotiation tracks ==
The peace negotiations were classified into parallel tracks on five geographical regions:

- Darfur: a political agreement including a ceasefire and humanitarian assistance was signed by Hemetti and the SRF on 21 October 2019; a framework agreement was signed on 28 December 2019; a final peace agreement was signed on 31 August 2020;
- the Two Areas: South Kordofan/Nuba mountains and Blue Nile state;
  - a political agreement was signed for the SPLM-N (al-Hilu) and by Khabbashi of the Sovereignty Council on 18 October 2019;
  - a ceasefire and humanitarian protocol agreement was signed by SPLM-N (Agar) and Hemetti on 17 December 2019; a framework agreement, including political and security agreements, was signed by Hemetti and Ahmed El Omda Badi on behalf of SPLM-N (Agar) on 24 January 2020, including legislative autonomy for the Two Areas and unification of all armed forces into a single national army; a security agreement to integrate the SRF into the Sudanese Armed Forces was signed on 17 August 2020; a final peace agreement was signed on 31 August 2020 by the SRF;
- northern Sudan: negotiations with the SRF were suspended on 22 January 2020 in relation to deciding how to respect the rights of the displaced from Wadi Halfa; on 26 January, a final agreement, including dam, road and toxic waste disposal issues, was signed by Khabbashi and by Dahab Ibrahim of the Kush Movement;
- central Sudan: a final peace agreement was signed by Hemetti and el-Tom Hajo of the SRF on 24 December 2019;
- eastern Sudan: a final peace agreement that increased eastern representation in federal structures and established financial institutions was signed on 21 February 2020;

Framework/final agreements:

Region	Date	Type or status	Govt signee	Rebel group(s)	Rebels' signee(s)	Ref(s)
Darfur	28 Dec 2019	framework	Khabbashi	JEM; SLM (Minnawi); SLM-TC; SLFA		
Darfur	31 August 2020	final	al-Burhan	SRF; SLM (Minnawi); JEM; SLM-TC + other		
Darfur	28 June 2020	(boycott)		SLM (al-Nur)		
Two Areas	24 Jan 2020; 17 Aug 2020; 31 Aug 2020	final	al-Burhan	SPLM-N (Agar)		
Two Areas	28 June 2020; 3 Sep 2020; 28 Mar 2021	ongoing		SPLM-N (al-Hilu)		
Northern	26 Jan 2020	final	Khabbashi	Kush Movement	Dahab Ibrahim	
Central	24 Dec 2019	final	Hemetti	SRF	el-Tom Hajo	
Eastern	21 Feb 2020	final				

== Negotiations and agreements ==
=== September 2019 Juba negotiations ===
In September 2019, following the transfer of power from the Transitional Military Council to the Sovereignty Council of Sudan, South Sudanese president Salva Kiir hosted talks in Juba between rebel movements, military members of the Sovereignty Council, and the Sudanese prime minister. Rebel movements involved in the Juba meetings included four Darfuri armed groups, the Justice and Equality Movement (JEM), the Sudan Liberation Movement/Army led by Minni Minawi (SLM-MM), the Sudan Liberation Movement–Transitional Council, and the Alliance of Sudan Liberation Forces; the Blue Nile/South Kordofan rebel group Sudan People's Liberation Movement-North al-Hilu faction (SPLM-N (al-Hilu)); and the Sudan-wide Sudan Revolutionary Front (SRF) that in 2011 allied together a wide range of Sudanese armed rebel groups. Hemetti, Sovereignty Council military member and leader of the Rapid Support Forces, arrived in Juba for the negotiations on 9 September.

Prime Minister Abdalla Hamdok and three cabinet ministers planned to arrive in Juba on 12 September for the negotiations.

Sudan researcher Eric Reeves expressed scepticism about the possibility of Hemetti being "ready to make peace", arguing that Hemetti was responsible for crimes against humanity and genocide during the wars in Darfur and South Kordofan.

=== October 2019 signed agreements ===
On 18 October, two separate meetings took place in Juba between rebel and Sovereignty Council (head of state) representatives, on the Two Areas and Darfur tracks.

In the Two Areas track, after a three-hour negotiating session mediated by a South Sudanese mediation team, Amar Daldoum, on behalf of the SPLM-N (al-Hilu) and Shams al-Din Khabbashi, on behalf of the Sovereignty Council signed an agreement on political, security and humanitarian procedures. The agreement was cosigned by the chair of the mediation team, Tut Galwak. The SPLM-N (al-Hilu) and the Sovereignty Council planned to develop a Declaration of Principles to organise continuation of the peace process and to present their political vision.

Independently on 18 October, the first Darfur track meeting between the SRF and Sovereignty Council representatives took place under South Sudanese mediation, creating a joint committee. The joint committee stated its intention to study the 11 September Juba Declaration, and propose how to move from confidence-building measures to negotiations on core issues. On 21 October, el-Hadi Idris, on behalf of the SRF, and Hemetti, on behalf of the Sovereignty Council signed a political agreement (co-signed by a South Sudanese mediator) including a renewed ceasefire, the delivering of humanitarian assistance by government agencies to areas under conflict, and commitment to negotiate further.

Following the 18 October meetings, Tut Galwak stated that Sudan, South Sudan and other African countries are committed "to end all forms of war" in Africa by the end of 2020.

=== December talks ===
The third round of negotiations started in Juba in mid-December 2019, after having been planned to start on 21 November 2019. The negotiation round was delayed for several weeks because of "the commitment of some of the armed movements to workshops related to the peace process", according to South Sudanese mediator Tut Galwak. The Forces of Freedom and Change (FFC) agreed with the SRF to delay the creation of the Transitional Legislative Council to 31 December, giving the SRF, SPLM-N (al-Hilu) and the government time to reach an agreement prior to the creation of the Legislative Council.

On 16 December, the SRF and "government representatives" discussed the eastern Sudan track. The government representatives wished to suspend talks until "civil leaders and prominent figures" from eastern Sudan were included; the SRF refused to wait, arguing that it would "[contradict] the Juba Declaration" and "hamper the negotiation tracks [which] are all intertwined".

On 17 December, on the Two Areas track, Hemetti and Malik Agar, head of SPLM-N (Agar), signed an agreement establishing a "humanitarian protocol and a ceasefire". The agreement includes a ceasefire monitoring group with three representatives from both sides and a South Sudanese chair, to be located in Khartoum, with a sub-office in Kadugli and another in Ed Damazin; and the sending of a joint mission to the Two Areas to assess humanitarian needs and plan and carry out a humanitarian action plan.

On 19 December, in the Darfur track, the SRF and government representatives created a committee, called a joint mechanism, for visiting Darfur with the help of the United Nations–African Union Mission in Darfur (UNAMID) in order to select "real representatives of the stakeholders". UNAMID committed itself to providing transport of the stakeholders to Juba for the negotiations. El Hadi Idris of the SRF described the creation of the mechanism as "an important breakthrough". Detailed Darfur track negotiations were expected to continue in Juba for several weeks.

South Sudanese mediator Dams Dhieu Mathok stated that "participation of refugees, displaced people and civil society leaders" was being negotiated and would constitute a critical element of the Darfur peace process.

In the Two Areas track, Mathok stated that the proposal was provided by the SPLM-N (al-Hilu) delegation to government representatives.

On 24 December, Hemetti on behalf of the Sovereignty Council and el-Tom Hajo, deputy head of the SRF and head of the Central track negotiation team, signed a peace agreement regarding "development, farmers' issues, the El Gezira and El Managil Agricultural Scheme, land rights, in addition to a fair distribution of wealth". Hajo described the agreement as "inclusive" without "quotas or positions".

Four Darfur representatives and Khabbashi signed a framework agreement on 28 December for the Darfur track, covering issues that included power sharing, wealth sharing, transitional justice and Darfur–Darfur dialogue. On 31 December, the SRF suspended talks on the Darfur track in relation to fighting that killed and wounded 708 people in el-Geneina. An FFC delegation visiting the area attributed the conflict to "the deep state" and victims attributed it to "janjaweed" and "militant herders in vehicles belonging to the Rapid Support Forces".

=== January 2020 agreements ===
On 21 January, negotiations on the eastern track were suspended until 30 January, because a consultative forum preparing for the negotiations was not inclusive enough of representatives from the Red Sea state, and too many supporters of al-Bashir's government were present in the forum.

Progress on land, transitional justice and system of government issues was made in the Darfur track on 21 January. SRF and Sovereignty Council representatives agreed on the creation of a Special Court for Darfur to conduct investigations and trials for war crimes and crimes against humanity carried out during the War in Darfur by the al-Bashir presidency and by warlords. The issue of whether or not to surrender Omar al-Bashir to the International Criminal Court was not discussed in the 21 January negotiations.

Two Areas negotiations with SPLM-N (al-Hilu) had progressed by 21 January on six framework agreement points, after a two-week pause, but disagreement remained on SPLM-N (al-Hilu)'s requirement of a secular state in South Kordofan and Nuba Mountains and Blue Nile self-determination.

On 22 January, talks on the northern track with the SRF were suspended in relation to deciding how to respect the rights of the displaced from Wadi Halfa.

On 24 January on the Two Areas track, political and security agreements, constituting a framework agreement, were signed by Hemetti on behalf of the Sovereignty Council and Ahmed El Omda Badi on behalf of SPLM-N (Agar). The agreements give legislative autonomy to South Kordofan and Blue Nile; propose solutions for the sharing of land and other resources; and aim to unify all militias and government soldiers into a single unified Sudanese military body.

On 26 January, a "final" peace agreement for the northern track, including issues of studies for new dams, compensation for people displaced by existing dams, road construction and burial of electronic and nuclear waste, was signed by Shamseldin Kabashi of the Sovereignty Council and Dahab Ibrahim of the Kush Movement.

=== February 2020 agreements ===
On 21 February 2020, a final agreement was made on the eastern track. The terms of the agreement included increased representation of eastern Sudan in the federal governmental structures; the establishment of a locally funded reconstruction fund; and the establishment of an internationally funded eastern Sudanese private bank to support political, educational, health and other administrative structures.

=== Agreements during the COVID-19 pandemic ===
Negotiations continued during the COVID-19 pandemic that reached Sudan in early 2020.

On 25 March, Sudan's defence minister Gamal al-Din Omar died of a heart attack in Juba after peace talks with rebel groups. Peace talks after al-Din Omar's death resumed on 2 April.

While talks in the Darfur track were ongoing, SLM (Minnawi) and JEM withdrew from the SRF in mid-May 2020, while continuing their alliance with each other and giving their new alliance the same name (Sudan Revolutionary Front). As of June 2020, the SLM (al-Nur) continued to boycott peace negotiations while waiting for the national authorities to make Darfur secure.

=== August 2020: integration of Sudan Revolutionary Front into army ===
On 17 August 2020, Khalid Abdin for the government, and Ahmed el-Omda for the SPLM-N (Agar) signed a security agreement for the Two Areas that included the integration of the armed forces of the Sudan Revolutionary Front into the Sudanese Armed Forces. Negotiations on political issues continued in the following days.

Negotiations with SPLM-N (al-Hilu) were planned to start around 21 August, discussing a declaration of principles, a ceasefire, and humanitarian aid.

=== 31 August 2020 Juba peace agreement ===
On 31 August 2020, a comprehensive peace agreement was signed between the Sovereignty Council and the SRF, which includes SPLM-N (Minnawi) and JEM for the Darfur track and SPLM-N (Agar) for the Two Areas track. Under the terms of the agreement, the factions that signed will be entitled to three seats on the sovereignty council, a total of five ministers in the transitional cabinet and a quarter of seats in the transitional legislature. At a regional level, signatories will be entitled between 30 and 40% of the seats on transitional legislatures of their home states or regions.

=== 3 September 2020 Addis Ababa peace agreement ===
An agreement was reached between the transitional government and the SPLM-North al-Hilu rebel faction on 3 September 2020 in Addis Ababa to separate religion and state and not discriminate against anyone's ethnicity in order to secure the equal treatment of all citizens of Sudan. The declaration of principles stated that 'Sudan is a multi-racial, multi-ethnic, multi-religious and multi-cultural society. Full recognition and accommodation of these diversities must be affirmed. (...) The state shall not establish an official religion. No citizen shall be discriminated against based on their religion.' Secularism had long been a demand of the SPLM-North al-Hilu, with a spokesperson saying: 'The problem is (...) to address why people became rebels? Because there are no equal citizenship rights, there is no distribution of wealth, there is no equal development in the country, there is no equality between black and Arab and Muslim and Christian.'

=== 3 October 2020 Juba peace agreement ===
The Juba Peace Agreement was signed between the SRF, SPLM–N led by Malik Agar and SLM led by Minni Minnawi and the Sudanese government on 3 October 2020, with the absence of both al Nur and al-Hilu. The deal included terms to integrate rebels into the security forces, and to grant them political representation and economic and land rights, in addition to a 10-year plan to invest $750 million to develop southern and western regions, and to guarantee the return for displaced people.

=== Sudanese civil war (2023–present) ===
During the 2023–present Sudanese civil war, ceasefires between the Sudanese Armed Forces (SAF) and the Rapid Support Forces (RSF) have been negotiated. The Treaty of Jeddah was internationally negotiated between the RSF, SAF, Saudi Arabia, and the United States. It became effective on 22 May 2023, and effectively expired the next day upon clashes resuming.

In December 2024, the Sudan welcomed Turkey’s diplomatic efforts to resolve the Sudanese conflict, and described the UAE as “terrorists”, over its constant support to the RSF military group. The Sudanese Foreign Minister called the Emirati efforts towards the Sudanese peace deal “hollow and false”, saying that peace will be achieved after the Emirates stop arms supply to the RSF.

In 2026, Sudanese political groups, such as the “Somoud” alliance and the Sudan Liberation Movement, convened in Nairobi, Kenya to adopt a roadmap aimed at ending the conflict. The signatories described the initiative not as another power-sharing arrangement between armed factions, but as a broader political process intended to address the structural causes of Sudan’s recurring wars. The declaration designated the National Congress Party (NCP) and the Islamic Movement as terrorist organizations, holding them responsible for fueling the current conflict and calling for accountability rather than political rehabilitation.

During meetings, Sudanese civil and political groups associated with the “Somoud” alliance argued that a sustainable resolution to the war required parallel humanitarian, political, and military tracks rather than a temporary ceasefire alone. The alliance also advocated a Sudanese-led dialogue supported by regional and international actors while maintaining that the Sudanese military and security institutions should ultimately remain subordinate to civilian political authority. The Somoud spokesman, Jafr Hasn Osman, described the Muslim Brotherhood and the Islamic Movement as major obstacles to ending the conflict, accusing them of involvement in previous coups and in perpetuating the current war.

In June 2026, Sudanese political and civil groups agreed on a shared framework for peace talks and a political settlement to end the war. A broad coalition including the Sumoud Alliance, the Democratic Bloc, the Arab Socialist Ba’ath Party (Original), the Popular Congress Party, the National Umma Party, and civil society, women’s, and youth organizations agreed in Addis Ababa to launch a Sudanese-led peace process through a preparatory committee toward a comprehensive political settlement. The coalition said the process aims to promote national reconciliation and establish a new social contract based on justice, equality, equal citizenship, and addressing marginalization, poverty, and uneven development.

== Women's participation ==
On 12 November, Ahlam Nasir, on behalf of Women of Sudanese Civic and Political Groups (MANSAM), met Sovereignty Council member Mohammed al-Ta'ishi, arguing that women should be included in the peace negotiations. Nasir presented specific proposals for women's participation in the negotiations and MANSAM's priorities in the peace process. According to Neville Melvin Gertze of Namibia who spoke at an October 2019 meeting of the United Nations Security Council, peace agreements that are the result of negotiations including women are 35 percent more likely to last at least 15 years than those which are the result of men-only negotiations.

On 17 December, the No to Oppression against Women Initiative requested the Sovereignty Council to include women, "especially displaced women and war victims", in the Sudanese peace process. Ihsan Fagiri of the Initiative described women's view of the peace process as extending beyond the formal signing of national-level agreements, by including "social peace, and health and education" and by Sudan signing the Convention on the Elimination of All Forms of Discrimination Against Women.
