= Siti Alnfor =

Slain Sudanese activist (1998–2021)

- ست النفور
- Born: Siti Alnfor Ahmed Bakr; 10 September 1997
- Died: 17 November 2021 (aged 24); Shambat, Khartoum North, Khartoum State, Sudan
- Cause of death: Gunshot wounds
- Resting place: Al-Kadro Cemetery
- Other name: Sitna
- Education: Neelain University
- Occupation: Nurse

Siti Alnfor Ahmed Bakr (10 September 1997 - 17 November 2021; Arabic: ست النفور احمد بكار), nicknamed Sitna, was a 24-year-old (Note: 25 and 22 was also reported) Sudanese nurse and women's human rights defender (WHRD) in Sudan. She was killed on 17 November 2021, during protests in Khartoum North against the coup d'état led by General Abdel Fattah al-Burhan. She was fatally shot by the security forces. Her face, depicted on black-and-white flags, became a symbol for the revolution.

== Life and activism ==
Born on 10 September 1997, Siti Alnfor, (Note: Siti Alnfor Ahmed Bakr is from a culture that does not use last names.) also known as Sitna, was a nurse who graduated from the Neelain University. Hailing from al-Kadro, north of Khartoum North, she was an activist, volunteer, and women's human rights defender (WHRD) who was active throughout the Sudanese revolution since 2018.

== The Killing of Sitna ==
The military coup in Sudan, led by General Abdel Fattah al-Burhan, took control of the Government of Sudan on 25 October 2021. The coup resulted in the dissolution of the government, declaration of a state of emergency, and arrest of several senior government figures. The military junta, under the guise of "correcting the course of the revolution," has disrupted the political transition that was initiated following the 2019 revolution.

Key civilian groups including the Sudanese Professionals Association and Forces of Freedom and Change called for civil disobedience and refusal to cooperate with the coup organisers. Protests started on 25 and 26 October against the coup and at least 10 civilians were reported as being killed and over 140 injured by the military during the first day of protests. Protests and strikes continued, with 200,000 to 2,000,000 protestors participating around Sudan on 30 October and 15 shot dead by security forces in protests organised by the Sudanese resistance committees on 17 November.

On the 17 November 2021, from noon to 4pm local time, unrest unfolded in Khartoum North and Al Siteen Street in Al Amarat, Khartoum, resulting in both fatalities and injuries. Protestors advocating for a government led by civilians were met with resistance from security and police forces, who employed tear gas and live rounds. The Central Committee of Sudanese Doctors confirmed that the day’s events led to the loss of 15 lives. Video footages implicated the Sudanese government riot police, the Central Reserve Forces, the Sudanese police forces, and unidentified individuals from the General Intelligence Service in civilian attire as the potential aggressors against the protestors.

External video
- The killing of Siti Alnfor, from Sudanese Archive, retrieved 07.01.2024

A video was posted on Facebook showed a protest site near Al Rabiata Shambat Square and the Al Taawun Stadium on Al Mouna Bahri street. The video captures the sound of what seems to be gunfire and protestors in flight. While the video does not show any security forces or police, it does show white smoke, possibly indicative of tear gas. At around 4 pm, the video also depicts a woman, later identified as Siti Alnfor Ahmed Bakr, being carried away after sustaining a gunshot wound to the chin by the security forces.

The casualties from the protest were transported to the International Hospital on Al Zaim Al Azhari street, where further protests took place with chants against military governance.

== Aftermath ==
Siti Alnfor's picture immerged as a new symbol for the Sudanese protests. Her face, depicted on black-and-white flags, was prominently displayed every week on the streets of Khartoum during protests against the coup d'état. The following days, the Ministry of Culture and Information placed Siti Alnfor's as the cover of its Facebook page, and US chargé d'affaires in Khartoum, Brian Shawkan, visited Siti Alnfor's family to offer his condolences.

Siti Alnfor's father declined an autopsy on her. However, her body was later exhumed and examined on 16 December 2021.

In 2022, a radiology suite at Ibrahim Malik Teaching Hospital was named after Siti Alnfor, and a memorial service commemorating her was conducted on 16 November 2022 near her house in al-Kadro.
