= Kandake of the Sudanese Revolution =

2019 Sudanese protest photograph

Kandake of the Sudanese Revolution by Lana H. Haroun (8 April 2019)

Kandake of the Sudanese Revolution (also known as Woman in White and Lady Liberty of the Sudanese Revolution; Arabic: كنداكة الثورة السودانية) is a photograph of Alaa Salah, then a 22-year-old student, standing on top of a car, dressed in white and gold, and leading a crowd of demonstrators in chant during the Sudanese anti-government protests on 8 April 2019. The photograph, taken by activist Lana Haroun using a smartphone, gained world-wide media attention and went viral in April 2019, and was described by several media organisations as iconic, representing women's participation in the revolution who were dubbed the Kandakas.

== Background ==
Beginning in December 2018, a series of protests against President Omar al-Bashir took place, demanding economic reforms and the resignation of the president. A state of emergency was declared in February 2019 as a result of the protests, but 6 and 7 April saw the largest protests. As protests continued, the army was observed protecting protesters from security forces on 10 April. Eventually the protests led to the military removing al-Bashir from power and installing a transitional council in his place led by Ahmed Awad Ibn Auf. The move was seen by the protesters as a mere change in the leadership of the same regime; the protesters demanded a civilian transitional council.

On 6 April, the Sudanese Professionals Association called for a march to the military headquarters in Khartoum. Hundreds of thousands of people protested and converged at the headquarters, where the security forces and military appeared to be divided in their allegiances. Some security forces tried to attack the protesters, while the military took the protesters' side and fired at the security forces. The following Sunday, social media was blocked and the power was cut in Sudan as protesters began a sit-in at the military headquarters in Khartoum, which lasted for a week until the Khartoum massacre on 3 June.

== The photograph ==
On the morning of 8 April, the army and secret services faced off at the headquarters, resulting in six deaths, 57 injuries, and 2,500 arrests in Khartoum over the weekend. The police were instructed not to intervene. "Every day I was there, capturing photos," Haroun recalls. "It felt like history itself."

On the same day, Lana Haroun took four images, using her smartphone (Huawei Mate 10, back camera, HDR technic), of an initially unknown woman dressed in a white thoub standing on top of a car, who spoke to and sang with other women around her during a sit-in near the army headquarters and the presidential palace. A line from Sudanese poet, Azhari Mohamed Ali's poem recited by the woman, "The bullet doesn't kill. What kills is the silence of people", has been a well-known slogan chanted by protesters during the 2018–2019 Sudanese protests and earlier in the 2011–2013 Sudanese protests. Haroun shared the image online.

=== Response and impact ===
Salah's white robe, a traditional Sudanese thoub, resembles the dress of female Sudanese protesters against previous dictatorships, as well as that of student protesters who were referred to as "Kandake" after ancient Nubian queens. Her golden earrings are traditional feminine wedding attire. The image has been seen as a symbol of the Sudanese people's pride in their culture and identity. According to Nesrine Malik from The Guardian, the image captured the energy and determination of the Sudanese people as they called for political change and social justice. Commentators referred to her pose as "the image of the revolution".

The image that came to be known as the Kandake of the Sudanese Revolution (also known as Woman in White and Lady Liberty of the Sudanese Revolution) was widely shared on social media and caught international media attention. According to Lana Haroun, there was a dearth of global attention on the events unfolding in Sudan, but after her picture gained traction, it seemed as if there was a sudden shift in the world's attention and people from all over the world started taking notice of the situation in Sudan.

The image become a symbol of the Sudanese Revolution and a representation of women's leadership in social movements. Salah, a 22-year-old student studying engineering and architecture, has become a symbol of women's leadership in the protests and a role model for young Sudanese women. In her first interview since the picture went viral, she spoke about the importance of women's participation in the protests and their role in shaping the future of Sudan, with some estimates claiming that up to 70 per cent of the protesters had been women. The image has also inspired a wave of feminist and women's rights activism in Sudan, with many women taking to the streets and using social media to voice their demands for equality and representation. Hala Al-Karib, a Sudanese women's rights activist, said: "It is a symbol of an identity of a working woman — a Sudanese woman that's capable of doing anything, but still appreciates her culture."

According to a list compiled by The Guardian, Alaa Salah's iconic photograph has been included among 48 protest photographs "that changed the world". The symbolism of the photo also inspired many Sudanese artists.

== Aftermath ==
=== Sudanese revolution ===
The sit-in at the military headquarters in Khartoum, Sudan came to a violent end on 3 June 2019. The armed forces of the Sudanese Transitional Military Council, headed by the Rapid Support Forces (RSF), used heavy gunfire and tear gas to disperse the sit-in by protesters, killing 112 and injuring more than 700 protesters, and destroying the peaceful atmosphere of the sit-in. The Khartoum massacre resulted in widespread national and international condemnation due to the #BlueforSudan and calls for justice from the international community. Following the massacre, protests continued across Sudan, which led to negotiations between the Transitional Military Council and civilian representatives eventually and the signing of a power-sharing agreement in August 2019, which established a joint civilian-military Sovereign Council and a civilian-led government.

=== Alaa Salah ===
Alaa Salah (Arabic: آلاء صلاح, pronunciation: [ʔaːˈlaːʔ sˤɑˈlaːħ]), born 9 March 1997, was 22 at the time when the photo was taken and a student studying engineering and architecture at Sudan International University in Khartoum. She gained world-wide media attention due to the photo, and she was dubbed the Sudanese revolution's icon. Salah was invited to several interviews to talk about the revolution, the photograph and her experience. Salah co-wrote the book The song of revolt - The Sudanese uprising told by its icon (French: Le chant de la révolte : le soulèvement soudanais raconté par son icône) with Martin Roux, providing her personal account of the Sudanese revolution.

As a member of MANSAM, one of the main Sudanese women's networks that signed the 1 January 2019 Forces of Freedom and Change declaration, Salah was later invited to give a speech at the 29 October 2019 meeting of the United Nations Security Council. In her speech, she insisting on equal representation of women in the Sudanese transitionary institutions.

In 2023, Salah received the Hillary Rodham Clinton Award in 2023, organised by Hillary Clinton and the Georgetown Institute for Women, Peace and Security.

=== Lana Haroun ===
Lana H. Haroun (Arabic: لانا هارون), a musician and photographer who was 34 at the time when she took the photo, gained prominence for capturing the photograph. Lana Haroun's followers increased to thousands, and her photograph was shared by thousands, while comments poured in from various parties, asking her for permission to publish the image, and expressing admiration for the photograph. In an interview, Lana Haroun expressed her perspective on photography as an integral part of her activism. Haroun stated, "It is not about the photo... it is about Sudanese people and Sudan's situation now", and the photograph captured the essence of the Sudanese revolution, highlighting the emotions, determination, and hope of the protesters through her lens.

== See also ==
- Siti Alnfor
- Photography of Sudan
- Soudan 2019, année zéro
- 2019–2022 Sudanese protests
- Aed Abu Amro
- Women in Sudan
- Hawa Al-Tagtaga
