= 2019 El Obeid massacre =

2019 massacre in Sudan

- Part of Sudanese Revolution
- El Obeid (Sudan)
- Location: 13°11′N 30°13′E; El Obeid, Sudan
- Date: 28 July 2019
- Target: Sudanese protesters
- Attack type: Mass murder
- Deaths: 6
- Injuries: 60+ injured
- Perpetrators: Rapid Support Forces , Sudanese Armed Forces,
- Motive: Dispersing a protest

The 2019 El Obeid massacre occurred on 29 July 2019, when the Sudanese Transitional Military Council (TMC) troops shot at student protesters, killing six people five of which were students aged from 14 to 16. Students had been rallying against the TMC and price hikes in El-Obeid, the capital of North Kordofan state, when soldiers belonging to the Rapid Support Forces (RSF) dispersed the protests violently.

== Background ==
The Sudanese revolution started in 2018 calling for the removal of the president Omar al-Bashir. Bashir was deposed on 11 April 2019, by the RSF and the Sudanese Armed Forces (SAF), who established a Transitional Military Council led by Abdel Fattah al-Burhan.

Democratic opposition groups and the Sudanese Professionals Association (SPA) continued the protests calling for civilian rule and transferring the power to the civilians who lead the revolution. The tensions between TMC and protesters heightened on third of June, when RSF used heavy gunfire and tear gas to disperse a sit-in protest in Khartoum leading to over 128 deaths.

== Massacre ==
On 28 July 2019, more than 500 secondary school students in El-Obeid started an spontaneous protest against the Khartoum massacre. Students were also protesting against price increases and shortages of bread. The protests were reportedly peaceful, although the governor of North Kordofan state al-Sadiq al-Tayeb Abdallah alleged that the protest were "infiltrated" by hostile forces who set a building belonging to the Bank of Khartoum on fire. On the second day of the protests the protesters were approaching the Sudanese French Bank, when RSF troops first started firing in the air after which they fired indiscriminately at protesters. After the gunshots SAF troops moved in on protesters using whips and metal bars to disperse the protest. The protests left six dead and over 60 people injured.

== Aftermath ==
After the massacre, protests in El Obeid continued and the markets and schools were shut down by the government. The governor of North Kordofan also blocked the internet and imposed a curfew on El Obeid and three other towns. The Forces for Freedom and Change (FFC) suspended the negotiations with the TMC and called on "all revolutionaries" in the country to "demonstrate, assemble and hold sit-ins in the streets". In Greater Khartoum tens of thousands of people took to the street denouncing the massacre. Protests were also held in Port Sudan, White Nile state, Kassala and various other states.

Abdel Fattah al-Burhan condemned the killing stating: "Killing peaceful civilians is an unacceptable crime that needs immediate accountability". On 2 August, spokesman for the TMC announced that nine members of RSF had been detained over the Khartoum and El Obeid massacre. On 5 August, the arrested members were sentenced to death for the killings by a Sudanese court.

== Responses ==
The UNICEF representative of Sudan Abdullah Fati condemned the killings in El-Obeid and called on the government to investigate and hold all perpetrators of violence against children accountable.

The Troika, the Embassy of United Kingdom and the Embassy of the United States in Khartoum condemned the killings and called for investigations on the massacre.
