= Hawa Al-Tagtaga =

Sudanese female singer and political activist (1926–2012)

Hawa al-Tagtaga
- حواء الطقطاقه
- Born: 1926; Al-Rahad, Sudan
- Died: December 10, 2012 (aged 85–86); Omdurman, Sudan
- Occupations: Singer, poet, activist

Hawa al-Tagtaga (alternatively Hawa Jah Elrasool, Arabic: حواء جاه الرسول, 1926 — 10 December 2012) was a Sudanese singer, composer and activist, who campaigned against British colonial rule.

== Biography ==
Al-Tagtaga was born in 1926 in El-Rahad, Abu-Dakna district in North Kordufan. Her father was a Sufi mystic and her mother a poet. From a young age, she wanted to be a singer, but her family were opposed to this and married her to a cousin, whom she later divorced so that she could follow a career in music.

She moved to Khartoum when she was fourteen-years old and soon after her arrival her singing was in demand for wedding parties. Her work developed into the wider role of the ghanaya - a woman who is responsible as a performer and singer for getting a bride ready for marriage, including teaching the bride to dance for the so-called henna party while also bathing and massaging them and passing on information about sexual relations.

During World War II she sang to entertain Sudanese soldiers. There are two rumours about why her name changed: One that she was given the nickname by British authorities, as she was demonstrating in every major town; the other that her voice was likened to a specific type of palm tree.

=== Political life ===
Al-Tagtaga joined the popular struggle against British colonialism and was famous throughout Sudan for her political activism and singing. She was a member of the Brothers Party, led by Ismail Al-Azari. She was arrested by the British government on several occasions, as well as being shot at when Al-Azari raised the new Sudanese flag. Along with Hasan Khalifa al-Atbarawi, she was arrested on the eve of independence in 1956 for singing nationalist songs at the Labour Theatre in Atbara and jailed for three months. Moreover, she had her front teeth knocked out by British troops whilst participating in a demonstration with the wife of Sudanese revolutionary Ali Abdel Latif.

After Al-Azari's election, Al-Tagtaga wrote a new song praising his wisdom and education, but also teasing those who now regretted not having joined his movement:

"Those who denounced you, they regretted / You won the state election / God bless your ideas and thoughts / Which represent your knowledge and wisdom / You have skilfully won our independence/ from the greatest country [England]".

=== Musical career ===
Being a well-known singer for weddings, she also sang for a variety of famous people, including Yasser Arafat, and performed at the wedding of King Farouk of Egypt and Narriman Sadek. In later life, Al-Tagtaga was recorded singing on the television programme Names in our Lives. She was an exponent of the important role television and radio could play in people's lives, particularly in bridging gaps between generations.

=== Later life ===
Al-Tagtaga lived out her life in Omdurman, but she never married, choosing, as she said, a life as a singer. As one of the last survivors of the revolution, she became a spokesperson for it, presenting television shows and receiving honours from Omar al-Bashir. She died aged 86, on 10 December 2012.

== Legacy ==
Flag of Sudan (1956–1970)

Al-Tagtaga was a well-known figure, and was easily recognisable, as she often wore a tobe (Sudanese women's garment, similar to a sari) in the colours green, yellow and blue, which were the colours of the first Sudan flag of independence. The flag was used from 1956 to 1970, but had a recent surge in popularity on social media in the 2019 revolution, with popular feeling wanting a new and more representative flag for the country.

Al-Tagtaga's mixture of political song and protest has inspired new generations of women in Sudan. During the 2019 revolution, the civil rights campaigner Alaa Salah recited poetry in the front of a crowd of protesters in Sudan. This marks a new chapter in a long tradition of Sudanese women singing poems of praise and lament in order to boost morale, honour the dead or to defy rulers. Today, many women in Sudan see Al-Tagtaga as a feminist icon in their country, and there are more female singers, considered as "Hawa's girls", following her lead and performing political songs in public.

== See also ==
- Music of Sudan
