= Lubna al-Hussein =

Sudanese media worker and activist

Lubna Ahmed al-Hussein
- Born: Al-Hussein
- Citizenship: Sudanese
- Occupations: Journalist, activist
- Employer: United Nations Mission
- Notable work: No to Oppression against Women Initiative

Lubna Ahmed al-Hussein is a Sudanese Muslim, media worker and activist who came to international attention in July 2009, when she was prosecuted for wearing trousers. Her case became a cause célèbre, with organisations such as the Arabic Network for Human Rights Information and Amnesty International issuing statements in support.

== Journalist ==
Al-Hussein is a journalist who, at the time of her 2009 arrest, worked for the media department of the United Nations Mission in Sudan. She was known for her public criticism of the government of Sudan's treatment of women.

== Trousers case ==
=== Background ===
In 2009, the legal system of the country was based on Islamic law (sharia), and permitted judicial corporal punishment such as flagellation. The criminal law of the time prohibited dressing indecently in public, a charge which carried a punishment of 40 lashes and a fine. According to the director of police, in 2008 in Khartoum State alone, over 40 000 women were arrested for clothing offences; it is not known how many were convicted or flogged.

==== Article 152 ====
The full text of Article 152 in the Memorandum to the 1991 Penal Code is:

152 Obscene and Indecent Acts

(1) Whoever does in a public place an indecent act or an act contrary to public morals or wears an obscene outfit or contrary to public morals or causing an annoyance to public feelings shall be punished with flogging which may not exceed forty lashes or with fine or with both.

(2) The act shall be contrary to public morals if it is regarded as such according to the standard of the person's religion or the custom of the country where the act takes place.

=== Arrest ===
On 3 July 2009, the Public Order Police entered the Kawkab Elsharq Hall, looking for any women and girls wearing trousers. Al-Hussein — who had come to book a cousin's wedding party and was watching an Egyptian singer and sipped a coke while she waited — was arrested with twelve other women. Ten of them pleaded guilty immediately, were given ten lashes each, and released. Hussein and two other women refused this offer and insisted on a trial.

Between the arrest and the trial, Hussein began to publicize the case by printing 500 invitation cards and sending emails with the subject line "Sudanese journalist Lubna invites you again to her flogging tomorrow". Hussein has used her legal battle as a public platform for attacking article 152, on the grounds that the way it is applied in the Sudan is neither constitutionally, nor dogmatically allowed by Shariah law. Her efforts have led to a public show of solidarity by women in the region, but also violence by Islamic extremists.

=== Appearances in court ===
When the case came to trial, the judge offered to dismiss it, pointing out that she enjoyed immunity from prosecution thanks to her United Nations job. Al-Hussein stated that she wished to resign her job, and test the law. If found guilty, she declared her intent to appeal her case to the upper court and even the constitutional court, in an effort to change the law.

In Al-Hussein's second appearance in court, on 4 August, the judge again postponed her case, this time for a month, saying he wanted to get advice about whether she was immune from prosecution or not. Outside the courtroom, police fired tear gas at trouser-clad protesters. Ban Ki-moon, the UN Secretary-General, stated his concern about the punishment she faces.

On 7 September she was found guilty and fined 500 Sudanese pounds, but not sentenced to flogging. She stated that she intended not to pay, and was prepared to face a month in jail instead. This third appearance again featured diplomats and human rights workers observing the case in court, and protesters outside. Journalists counted about 150 of the latter, who were heckled by a smaller number of counter-protesters and beaten by riot police. At least 40 protesters were arrested and released on bail.

=== International media ===
When Hussein tried to fly to Lebanon in early August 2009 for an interview about her case, the Sudanese authorities prevented her from leaving the country.

Outside Sudan, support for her case developed slowly, despite her intimate knowledge of how the media works and her international contacts. The BBC radio programme Woman's Hour discussed the extent to which the case had been ignored by British feminists.

=== Opposition to the law ===
Hussein's case became a test case for women's rights in Sudan. Hussein, who considers herself to be a good Muslim and was wearing loose-fitting pants covered by a long blouse, contends that the case "is not about religion, it is about men treating women badly." She stated that she wanted to change the law on behalf of all the women of Sudan. She argued that Article 152, which allows the flogging or fining of anyone who "violates public morality or wears indecent clothing" without defining "indecent clothing", itself violates both the 2005 Interim Constitution of Sudan and Sharia.

On the eve of Hussein's third appearance in court, Amnesty International (AI) released a statement asking the Sudanese government to repeal Article 152 and drop the charges against her. AI stated that the African Commission on Human and Peoples' Rights "ordered Sudan to amend Article 152 on the grounds that flogging amounted to state-sanctioned torture" in 2003.

According to an article in Foreign Policy, this case encouraged disparate activists, from NGOs to opposition politicians, to cooperate with one another in their efforts to change the law.

== No to Oppression against Women Initiative ==
Hussein and her two colleagues' insistence on going to trial in the trousers case inspired the creation of the No to Oppression against Women Initiative, which a decade later was one of the signatories to the Forces of Freedom and Change (FFC) declaration on 1 January 2019. The No to Oppression against Women Initiative directly and indirectly, via the FFC, contributed to the 2018–2019 Sudanese Revolution. During the 39-month transition phase to democracy, Ihsan Fagiri, on behalf of the No to Oppression against Women Initiative, protested against the men-only nature of the Khartoum massacre investigation commission created in October 2019. She stated that, as many women had been killed or thrown dead into the Nile, 70 women and men had been raped, and three women rape victims had committed suicide after the massacre, women should be represented as commission members.

== See also ==
- Human rights in Sudan
- Sudanese teddy bear blasphemy case
- Liberal movements within Islam
- Islamic feminism
- Hijab
- Islam and clothing
- Clothing laws by country
- Islamic religious police, sometimes known as mutaween
