= Amira Osman Hamed =

Sudanese women's rights activist

- Citizenship: Sudan
- Occupation: Human rights activist

Amira Osman Hamed is a Sudanese women’s rights activist and co-founder of the No to Oppression against Women Initiative.

== Early life ==
Born in 1976 in Sudan, Hamed studied computer engineering. Under President Omar al-Bashir, she was arrested twice in 2013 for refusing to wear a headscarf that covered her hair, and in 2002 for wearing pants. These cases recall the case of journalist Loubna al-Hussein in 2009. Sudanese and international organizations mobilized to support her and she was released.

In April 2019, el-Bashir was overthrown. A transition began towards a democratic regime. This was interrupted by a new military coup in October 2021, bringing Abdel Fattah al-Burhan to power. Again, this regime imprisoned its opponents. Hamed was arrested by a police raid on her home in January 2022. She was detained in Omdurman. A new mobilization of Sudanese and international organizations organized to obtain her release, which they obtained in early February 2022, after more than two weeks of incommunicado detention. She remained subject to prosecution. She then tried to lead the mobilization against the military, notably demonstrating in front of the Omdurman women's prison.

== Award ==
In 2022, Hamed won the Front Line Defenders Award for Human Rights Defenders at Risk.
