= 2018 Sudanese protests =

Anti government protests in Sudan

- Part of the Sudanese revolution
- Date: January 10 – February 1
- Location: Sudan
- Caused by: High price hikes of fuel and bread; Hard living conditions and inflation; Corruption
- Goals: End of sanctions and crisis in Sudan; Resignation of President Omar al-Bashir; Fresh general elections
- Methods: Demonstrations
- Result: Protests suppressed by force; Sudanese Revolution erupts

The 2018 Sudanese protests were a series of peaceful demonstrations and protest actions nationwide targeting the issues they had. Anti-government rioting has also been occurring nationwide. Anti-austerity and anti-corruption agencies have protested as well, demanding democratic reforms and justice. The movement was suppressed by February 1, while 2 has been killed.

Protesters first came into the streets demanding the end of the government and an end to corruption. Clashes erupted between the military as tanks was pulled in and the army was deployed to quell mass unrest from spreading. Bread riots occurred in Omdurman, where the demonstrations first broke out.

Tear gas was used to disperse protesters who pelted rocks and demanded an end to spiralling food inflation and pressure on doctors. Doctors, students and mothers all joined the protest movement, leading to more violence. The large-scale civil unrest was suppressed on 28 January-1 February when 2 was killed in various acts of Civil disobedience. Massive disorder also rocked Khartoum but was suppressed brutally but ultimately, it led to the Sudanese Revolution.

== See also ==
- 2011-2013 protests in Sudan
- 2016 Sudanese protests
- Sudanese Revolution
