= Darfur war crimes court =

Court trying suspects of war crimes in Sudan

The Darfur war crimes court or Special Court for Darfur is a planned court to be created in Sudan for trying suspects of war crimes and crimes against humanity carried out during the War in Darfur.

== Plans for creating the court ==
On 21 January 2020, in the Darfur track of the 2019–2020 component of Sudanese peace process negotiations, the Sudan Revolutionary Front (SRF) and Sovereignty Council representatives agreed on the creation of a special court for trying suspects of war crimes and crimes against humanity carried out during the War in Darfur. The SRF and the Sovereignty Council agreed to create a commission that would establish the court.
