= Hind Meddeb =

French-Tunisian filmmaker and journalist

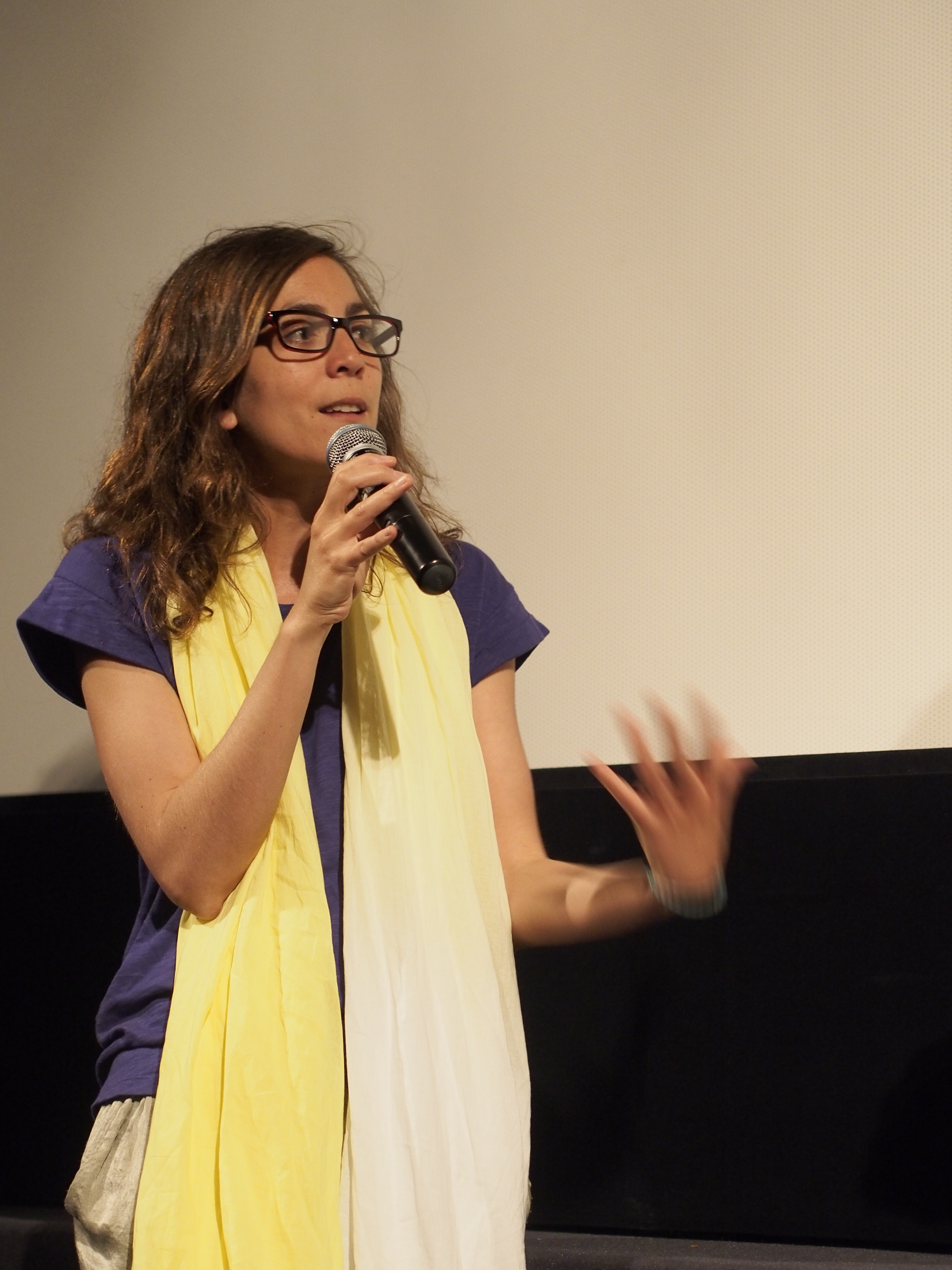
- Born: 1978 (age 47–48); Châtenay-Malabry, Grand Paris, France
- Occupations: Journalist, film director
- Years active: 2006 to present
- Father: Abdelwahab Meddeb
- Website: https://hindmeddeb.fr

Hind Meddeb is a French journalist and documentary film director with a North African family background. Based in Paris, France, she works both in Europe, North Africa and the Middle East. In her films and journalistic writing, she has presented social protests of young people and their culture in Morocco, Tunisia, Sudan and Egypt. Documenting their social situation and political expressions in the context of the Arab revolutions, she has further focussed on rap music or other kinds of counter-culture and protest in these countries.

== Biography ==
Meddeb was born in Châtenay-Malabry, a suburb of Paris, France. Her father was the Tunisian poet and essayist Abdelwahab Meddeb, and her mother is the linguist Amina Maya Khelladi of Moroccan-Algerian descent. She graduated from Paris Institute of Political Studies (Sciences Po) and also holds a Master of Philosophy degree from Paris West University Nanterre La Défense. Moreover, she studied German language and literature at the Sorbonne Nouvelle University and did research at the Free University of Berlin.

== Career ==
Meddeb worked as a journalist for France 24 TV network from 2006 to 2008 before joining France Info. From 2010 to 2011 she was a reporter for the show Ça balance à Paris on Paris Première TV channel and served as cultural reporter for Tracks magazine.

On 13 June 2013, she was arrested in Tunis, but released the same day. She was accused of disturbing public order and insulting police officers after having defended the Tunisian rapper Weld El 15, who had recorded a song comparing the Tunisian police with dogs.

As a documentary filmmaker, Meddeb has co-directed De Casa au Paradis, a documentary about a group of Moroccan suicide bombers, and helmed Electro Chaabi, which covers the emergence of a new electronic musical genre called Mahraganat in Cairo. She also directed Tunisia Clash, a film about young rappers advocating for freedom of speech in Tunisia, and Paris Stalingrad, a documentary about asylum seekers in France.

In 2005, she won the Daniel Pearl Prize for multiculturalism for a story on young Muslims growing up in France. In May and June 2019, she witnessed the Sudanese revolution in Khartoum, which became the focus of her next film. Based on this experience, she contributed to the 2021 French book Soudan 2019, année zéro that presents descriptions, commentaries and photographs about the weeks that lead up to the Khartoum massacre. The premiere of her documentary Sudan, Remember Us was in late August 2024 at the Giornate degli Autori section, also known as Venice Days, an independent section of the 81st Venice International Film Festival.

== Filmography ==
- 2008: De Casa au Paradis (co-directed with Gallagher Fenwick)
- 2013: Electro Chaabi (director)
- 2015: Tunisia Clash
- 2019: Paris Stalingrad (co-directed with Thim Naccache), selected for festivals such as Cinema du Réel, Toronto International Film Festival, Journées cinématographiques de Carthage, Doc NYC, Cairo International Film Festival.
- 2024: Sudan, Remember Us (French title: Soudan, Souviens-toi)
