= Treaty of Jeddah (2023) =

2023 two-week long treaty for peace in Sudan

Treaty of Jeddah معاهدة جدة
Jeddah Declaration of Commitment to Protect the Civilians of Sudan: the Sudanese Armed Forces and the Rapid Support Forces Agreement on a Short-Term Ceasefire and Humanitarian Arrangements.
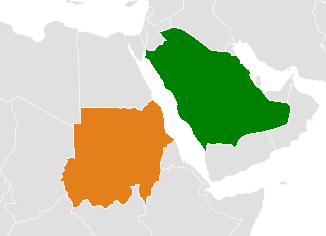
- Location of Saudi Arabia and Sudan on a world map
- Type: Peace treaty
- Signed: 20 May 2023 (violated)
- Location: Jeddah, Saudi Arabia
- Sealed: 21 May 2023
- Effective: 22 May 2023
- Expiry: 23 May 2023 (Warring sides restart large clashes across Sudan); 27 May 2023 (Official expiration date on the agreement)
- Signatories: United States; Sudan; Rapid Support Forces; Sudanese Armed Forces; Saudi Arabia
- Languages: 2: Arabic and English

Full text
- Treaty of Jeddah (2023) at Wikisource
- The United States and Saudi Arabia suspended the agreement fully on 1 June 2023 after several violations, failed agreements, and ceasefires.; Due to violations, The U.S. imposes sanctions on Sudan's warring sides.; Talks resumed on 7 June 2023

The Treaty of Jeddah (initially known as the Jeddah Agreement) or Jeddah Declaration is an international agreement that was made to end the ongoing Sudanese civil war. The treaty by the United States, Saudi Arabia, and Sudan and representatives of both warring sides on 20 May 2023, entered into force 48 hours later on 22 May 2023. The agreement was intended to facilitate a week-long ceasefire and the distribution of humanitarian aid within the country. The agreement expired suddenly after a surge of clashes on 23 May 2023, a day after the agreement came into effect. With the actual date of expiry being 27 May 2023, the nations agreed on an extension for five days but was shortened due to the agreement's ineffectiveness.

== Background ==
In 2003, war broke out in western Sudan's Darfur region between the government-sponsored, predominantly Arab Janjaweed militia aided by the Sudanese Armed Forces against the predominantly non-Arab Sudan Liberation Movement and Justice and Equality Movement, after SLM and JEM launched attacks against the Sudanese government and accusing them of genocide. El Geneina, as the capital of West Darfur, saw a copious amount of violence, due to its location as the sultanate of the Masalit people. The city had a population of 250,000 in 2008.

In 2020, the war came to an end after several rebel groups signed a peace treaty with the Sudanese government following the Sudanese Revolution and the ousting of Omar al-Bashir. In the process, the Janjaweed restructured itself into the Rapid Support Forces, although many Darfuris still call it the Janjaweed.

Tensions between the RSF and the Sudanese junta began to escalate in February 2023, as the RSF began to recruit members from across Sudan. A brief military buildup in Khartoum was succeeded by an agreement for de-escalation, with the RSF withdrawing its forces from the Khartoum area. The junta later agreed to hand over authority to a civilian-led government, but it was delayed due to renewed tensions between generals Burhan and Dagalo, who serve as chairman and deputy chairman of the Transitional Sovereignty Council, respectively. Chief among their political disputes is the integration of the RSF into the military: the RSF insisted on a ten-year timetable for its integration into the regular army, while the army demanded integration within two years. Other contested issues included the status given to RSF officers in the future hierarchy, and whether RSF forces should be under the command of the army chief rather than Sudan's commander-in-chief, who is currently al-Burhan. They have also clashed over authority over sectors of Sudan's economy that are controlled by the two respective factions. As a sign of their rift, Dagalo expressed regret over the October 2021 coup.

In early 2023, tensions rose between the Sudanese Armed Forces, led by the 2021 coup leader Abdel Fattah al-Burhan, and the paramilitary Rapid Support Forces led by Hemedti, remnants of Omar al-Bashir's Janjaweed that committed ethnic cleansing against non-Arab tribes in Darfur. These tensions came to a head on 15 April, when RSF forces attacked Sudanese forces in Khartoum, Merowe, and several cities across Darfur, including Nyala, El Fasher, and Geneina.

On 5 May 2023, the U.S. and Saudi Arabia announced a peace operation for peace in Sudan and a permanent ceasefire for the conflict on 20 May 2023. The agreement was officially signed and was supposed to come into effect two days later. This failed as large clashes still made headlines even after the announcement of the agreement in Sudan.

== Prelude ==
The large emergency evacuation plan for the humanitarian crisis and the evacuation of citizens in Sudan.

After a surge of refugees, a large humanitarian crisis and evacuation of citizens and foreign nationals began. Saudi Arabia and the U.S. announced an agreement that would occur on 11 May 2023 between both warring parties with the help of the United States and the Kingdom of Saudi Arabia (KSA).

=== Humanitarian crisis in Sudan ===
The governor of the state of North Darfur called the humanitarian situation in the region of Darfur dire. The Project Coordinator for Médecins Sans Frontières (MSF) in the state's capital of the state El-Fasher said that the only remaining hospital in the state was "rapidly running out of medical supplies to treat survivors" while other hospitals have had to close due to their proximity to the conflict or the inability of staff to get to the facilities because of the violence. MSF said that its compound in the city of Nyala, South Darfur, had been raided by armed men who "stole everything including vehicles and office equipment".

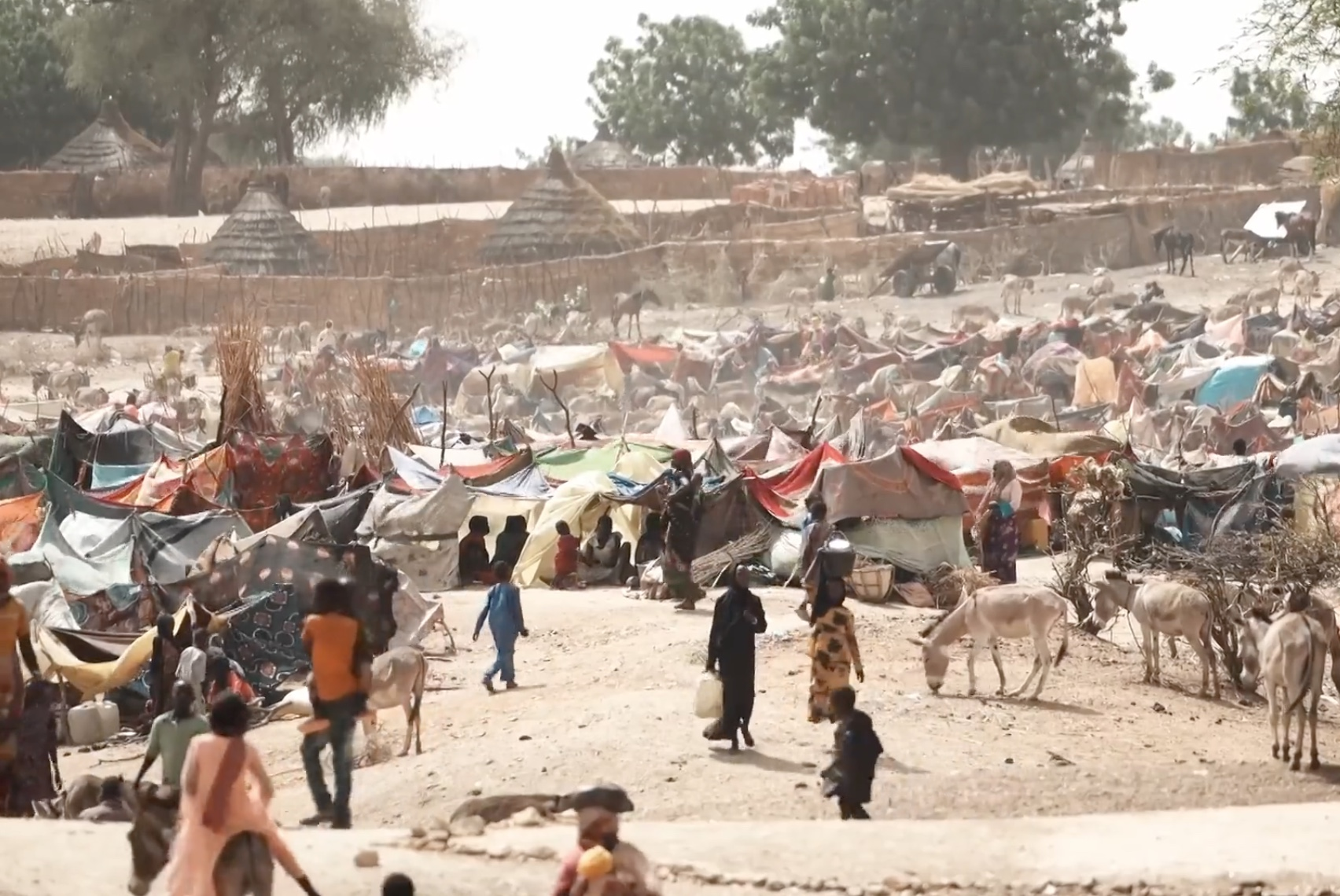
Chad-Sudan border refugees in mid-May 2023

The United Nations said on 2 May that the fighting in Sudan had produced around 334,000 internally displaced persons, while more than 100,000 had fled the country altogether. The International Organization for Migration estimated that around 70% of IDPs came from the Darfur region. The UN projected that the total number of refugees fleeing Sudan could reach more than 800,000 people. By June 2023, The UN and other nations estimated this number to over 1.8 million internally displaced people (IDP's) and nearly 400,000 fleeing the country, mainly in the Darfur region.

During the evacuation, thousands of people fled from Port Sudan to Saudi Arabia via several boats. On 12 May 2023, announced the end of evacuations in Sudan and reported fully evacuating 19,639 people (8,455 people and 11,184 nationals)

== Agreement ==
On 5 May 2023, the U.S. and Saudi Arabia announced their commitment to helping Sudanese people with a permanent ceasefire and agreement between both parties in Jeddah. On 11 May 2023 the agreement was signed in the city with the following requirements:

- 1. Agreeing that the well-being of civilians is a top priority, ensuring that they are protected at all times and allowing them a safe passage to flee areas affected by the fighting.
- 2. Respecting International Humanitarian Law and international human rights law which, for instance, obligate differentiating between civilians and military targets, not using civilians as human shields, and respecting public and private institutions.
- 3. Agreeing on the need to allow principal humanitarian operations to resume by facilitating the unhindered passage of humanitarian aid and guaranteeing the freedom of movement of aid personnel, protecting humanitarian workers and not intervening in the work of humanitarian operations.
- 4. Commit to make all efforts that respect the obligation of International Humanitarian Law.
- 5. Allowing relevant actors, such as the Sudanese Red Crescent and/or the International Committee of the Red Cross, to take all steps needed to bury the dead in coordination with relevant authorities.
- 6. Ensuring that all people operating under the instructions of the armed forces and the RSF abide by International Humanitarian Law.
- 7. Prioritizing talks to reach a short-term ceasefire to ease the delivery of urgent humanitarian aid and restore essential services and committing to scheduling more expanded discussions to reach a permanent end to hostilities.

The first agreement was broken a day later on 12 May 2023, and talks resumed again On 21 May 2023, all the parties made a week long ceasefire for humanitarian aid and calmness in Sudan, the agreement came into effect 48-hour's later but was subsequently broken. A third meeting was made between the parties once again for a shorter but more effective ceasefire, but was also violated completely with reports of atrocities such as the killing's of several orphans and the mistreatment of civilians. On 31 May 2023, the SAF suspended their participation in the agreement, followed by both the U.S. and Saudi Arabia on 1 June 2023.

Talks resumed between all the parties on 7 June 2023. Subsequently, talks were again suspended with attempts at resumption through mediation by United States Secretary of State Antony Blinken failing in May 2024.
