= Amal Habani =

Sudanese freelance journalist

- Born: Amal Khalifa Idris; 19 September 1974 (age 51); Khartoum, Democratic Republic of Sudan (present-day Sudan)
- Education: Master of Media Studies
- Occupations: Journalist; Activist
- Awards: 2018 Time Person of the Year Award

Amal Khalifa Idris Habani (Arabic: أمل خليفة إدريس هباني, romanized: Amal Khalīfah Idrīs Habānī; born 19 September 1974) is a Sudanese journalist and human rights activist.

== Background and education ==
Following her degree in Media Studies from the University of Khartoum, Habani worked as a freelance journalist and contributor to the Sudanese news outlet Al-Taghyeer. She is a co-founder of the local independent press freedom group Sudanese Journalists Network, based in Khartoum.

== Human rights activism ==
Habani is also a human rights activist. She is the co-founder of the Sudanese women's movement No to Oppression against Women, a social initiative established in 2009 that calls for change in Sudanese laws that discriminate against and target women in Sudan.

== Persecution and torture ==
Habani has repeatedly been harassed, detained and tortured by Sudanese authorities in connection with her coverage of protests and official infringements of civil liberties. In 2013, she was detained for days in an undisclosed location, after she reported critically on police response to protests in Khartoum. In 2017, she was arrested in connection with her coverage of a trial of a human rights organization accused of "publishing false reports". After refusing to pay the fine and preferring to be jailed, she was released after a crowdfunding campaign raised the funds. Documenting human rights violations, Habani was arrested on 16 January 2018 and again from 16 January to 18 February 2023 for being part of a public demonstration addressing the prices of goods and the economic crisis facing Sudan.

In late 2023, Habani and her sons were granted refuge by the German Panter Foundation and Reporters without Borders in Berlin, Germany,

== Awards ==
- Habani received the Human Rights Activist Award with the No to Oppression against Women Initiative in 2014 from the EU delegation in Sudan.
- Habani has received recognition for her courageous opposition outside of her country: in 2014, Amnesty International awarded her the prestigious Ginetta Sagan Prize.
- In 2018 Habani was among the journalists described as "The Guardians" who were named Time Person of the Year of the United States news magazine Time.
- International Press Freedom Award 2018
