= Sudan, Remember Us =

2024 documentary film by Hind Meddeb

- Promotional poster
- French: Soudan, souviens-toi
- Directed by: Hind Meddeb
- Screenplay by: Hind Meddeb
- Produced by: Abel Nahmias; Michel Zana; Alice Ormières; Taoufik Guiga
- Starring: Shajane Suliman; Ahmed Muzamil; Maha Elfaki; Khatab Ahmed
- Cinematography: Hind Meddeb
- Edited by: Gladys Joujou
- Production companies: Echo Films; Blue Train Films; My Way Productions Tounès
- Distributed by: Sophie Dulac Distribution (France)
- Release dates: 30 August 2024 (Venice); 7 May 2025 (France)
- Running time: 78 minutes
- Countries: France; Tunisia; Qatar
- Languages: Arabic; English

Sudan, Remember Us (French: Soudan, souviens-toi) is a 2024 documentary film written and directed by Hind Meddeb. It depicts the aftermath of the Sudanese revolution, which resulted in the 2019 overthrow of Sudanese leader Omar al-Bashir and a military coup d'état in 2021.

The film had its world premiere in the Giornate degli Autori section of the 81st Venice International Film Festival on 30 August 2024. It was theatrically released in France on 7 May 2025 by Sophie Dulac Distribution.

== Synopsis ==
In April 2019, young Sudanese activists in Khartoum participate in the uprising and the overthrow of 35-years of dictatorship. After the initial success of the Sudanese revolution, a military crackdown in June 2019 put an end to the hopes for freedom, and the Sudanese civil war started in April 2023.

== Production ==
Filming began in 2019 in Khartoum and covered events up to the beginning of the civil war in 2023. Meddeb focussed her documentation on young and often female protesters who represent the generation strongly involved in the uprising. Other than traditional documentary techniques such as hand-held camera work, Meddeb included found footage of vertical smartphone videos in the style of gonzo journalism. Further, the film uses Sudanese political murals, slogans, poetry, music and rap lyrics. During a boat ride on the Nile, young people sing along with Ibrahim al-Kashif’s patriotic song “Land of Goodness”, known as the anthem of the revolution: “I am Sudanese, I am African/Moving forward, head held high.”

== Release ==
The film premiered at the 81st Venice International Film Festival in the Giornate degli Autori section on 30 August 2024. In September 2024, it was shown at the Toronto International Film Festival, followed by selections for other international festivals in 2025. Theatrical release in Europe began in France in May 2025, with UK theaters following at the end of June 2025.

== Reception ==
On the review aggregator website Rotten Tomatoes, 100% of 23 critics' reviews are positive, with an average rating of 4.5/10.

Murtada Elfadl of Variety wrote that the film was "exhilarating" and "a thoughtful and empathetic look at how collective hope can mobilize a whole generation". Hyphen magazine's Leila Latif called the film "intimate, harrowing and urgent." Situated "in the wreckage of a complex series of tragedies", the film makes the audience "feel the full weight of hope abandoned."

In September 2024, Sudan, Remember us was shown in the Official Selection at the Toronto International Film Festival (TIFF). In his review for TIFF, Thom Powers wrote: "Meddeb simply bears witness to courageous people receiving scant coverage."

Writing for the Financial Times on the upcoming release in UK cinemas, Danny Leigh called the film a "sad and lyrical [...] chronicle of hope and violence" and commented on the film's protagonists that "after the end credits, what stays with you most is the memory of their optimism: clear-eyed and unkillable." In The Guardian, Peter Bradshaw noted the film's "subversive, surrealist energy" and "a vivid, vibrant artistic movement: an oral culture of music, poetry and rap which flourishes on the streets."

== Selected awards and nominations ==
- Venice International Film Festival 2024, Official selection
- Audience Award at 2024 Ajyal Festival, Qatar
- International Federation for Human Rights (FIDH) endorsement
- San Francisco International Film Festival 2025, Official Selection

== See also ==
- Cinema of Sudan
- Soudan 2019, année zéro
- Khartoum (2025 film)
