= Soudan 2019, année zéro =

French book about the Sudanese revolution of 2019

- Author: Bach, Jean-Nicolas, Mongiat, Fabrice et al.
- Illustrator: Sudanese documentary photographers
- Cover artist: Mohamed Keeta
- Language: French
- Subject: Sudanese revolution
- Genre: nonfiction
- Publisher: Soleb, bleu autour
- Publication date: 6 May 2021
- Publication place: France
- Pages: 144
- ISBN: 978-2-918157-44-1
- Website: Editor's page

Soudan 2019, année zéro (transl. Sudan 2019, Year Zero) is a book about the Sudanese revolution, published in French in 2021. It contains descriptions, commentaries and photographs of the protestors' sit-in area during the weeks in May and June 2019 that led up to the Khartoum massacre. As additional visual documents, the book contains images by Sudanese documentary photographers, illustrating different stages and social backgrounds of the revolution up to the destruction of the sit-in by security forces on 3 June 2019.

== Authors, poets and photographers ==
The book was edited and written by French political scientist Jean-Nicolas Bach and the director of the French cultural centre – Institut français – in Khartoum, Fabrice Mongiat. Additional text was contributed by Azza Ahmed Abdel Aziz, Azza Mustafa Mohammed Ahmed, Duha Bakri, Hiba Diab, Hind Mahmoud Yousif Hussein, Hind Meddeb, Jean-Luc Fauguet, Mohamed Abdelbagi G. Bakhit, Mohamed Musa Ibrahim, Osama Abu Zied, Sadam Faris, Mohammed Ahmad Enour, Tamer Mohammed, Ahmed Abd Elkreem, Said Ahmed and Yasir Awad Abdalla Eltahir.

Sudanese poetry of protest and resistance is presented through works by Azhari Mohammed Ali, Nylawo Ayul, Youssef Elbadawi Hamad, Mohamed al-Hassan Salem Humaid, Mahjoub Sharif, Hashim Siddiq as well as by anonymous poets.

The photographers who contributed their documentary images were Ahmed Ano, Duha Mohammed, Eythar Gubara, Hind Meddeb, Issam Hafiez, Jean-Nicolas Bach, Metche Jaafar, Mohamed Keeta, Mohamed Noureldin, Mohammed Alasmani, Osama Abu Zied, Saad Eltinay, Sari Omer, Suha Barakat and Ula Osman.

In addition, the book's front and back cover show geographical maps of the protest sites in Khartoum with descriptions of the various places of action and artistic creation. Pictures of murals and graffiti, documentary videos and an interactive map of the sites have also been published online at sudanrevolutionart.org

== Background ==
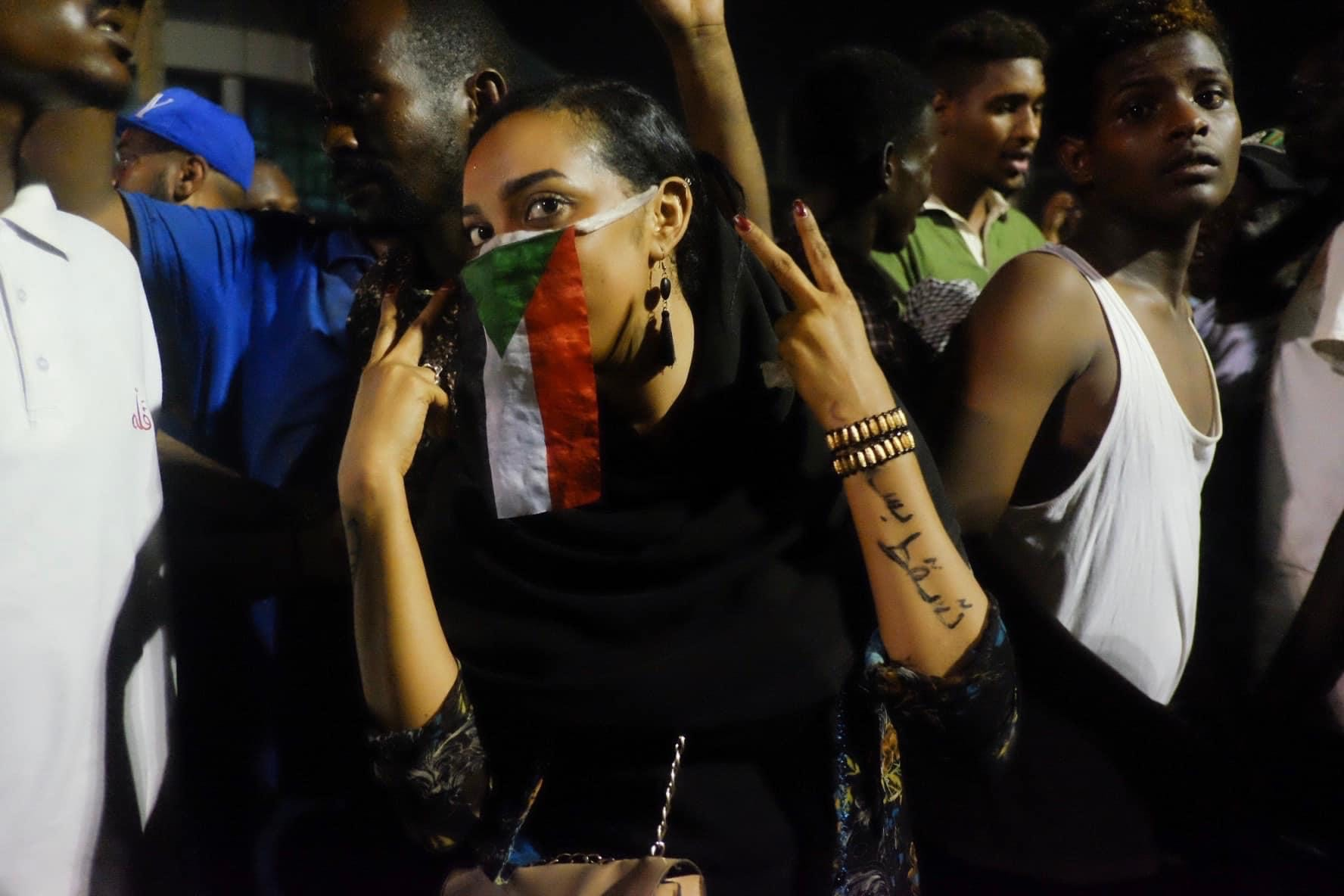
Sudanese woman protesting at the sit-in with slogan Just fall, that's all! written on her arm, by Ola Alsheikh

On April 11, 2019, the dictatorial and Islamist government of Omar al-Bashir, which had ruled over the Sudan for thirty years, was overthrown by popular protests. During the previous four months, an improvised camp, referred to in English as "the sit-in", had been the centre of the protests in front of the Ministry of Defence in central Khartoum, called al-Qiyada. The camp was busy day and night with Sudanese of all ages and different social backgrounds, confronting the military, police and other security forces. At the same time, this protest camp was considered as a social, political and artistic stage for the beginning of a democratic Sudan.

After the coup d'état by the Sudanese military, negotiations between the succeeding junta and the opposition came to a dead end, as the protestors were hostile to a military-led transition and reclaimed a civilian-led government. On June 3, security forces destroyed the sit-in, killing and wounding many people, and using sexual violence against women. After weeks of uncertainty and with the help of African Union mediation, a transitional government, consisting of both civilians and leaders of the military, was formed in August 2019. It accepted the responsibility for governing the country during the transition to democracy until national elections, scheduled for 2022.

== Contents ==
The book presents a decisive moment of the revolution, that it calls 'year zero' of the new Sudan. Most photographs and texts were created by Sudanese women and men. They intended to present an insider's view of the protests, both through documentary images and by bearing witness to the protesters' expectations and creative expressions, as well as through personal accounts of success, fear and temporary defeat.

In his chapter 'The sit-in of the Qiyada', Jean-Nicolas Bach describes the succeeding stages of the protests that he witnessed as a researcher at the Centre for Economic, Legal and Social Studies (CEDEJ Khartoum), a French research centre in Sudan. Apart from the chronology of these events, the book wants to present the diversity of the protesters in terms of their social and political background. An important part of the book are translated slogans, pamphlets, discussions, personal recollections, prayers and poems, as well as references to musical expressions of protest, and photographs of wall paintings or scenes during he protests. Referring to the important role of young men and women, Bach quotes one of the female protesters, who called these events "a renaissance of a generation through the revolution".

The sit-in camp and the lyrical and spontaneous expression of young men and women constitute a fundamental turning point in the contemporary history of Sudan. It is a rite of passage, that is leading the Sudanese nation from the stage of a traditional, patriarchal and dictatorial society into a new era, whose key concepts are freedom, peace and justice.

— Mohamed Abdelbagi G. Bakhit, Faculty of Economic & Social Studies, University of Khartoum

Another chapter presents information about the important roles of the Sudanese Professionals Association and the involvement of women in the non-violent protests. Further, there is a short glossary of revolutionary slogans, for example tasgot bass (Just fall, that's all!) or We are all Darfur!, expressing solidarity with the western Sudanese states of Darfur. Various forms of artistic creation, such as written and oral poetry, paintings and graffiti as well as documentary photography that contributed to the spirit of the revolution are presented in the next chapters. Further accounts cover the stages and different motivations for the social and political developments. Another chapter is dedicated to the organization and activities at the sit-in, ranging from media coverage to medical services, an open library to the supply of food and water.

A digital copy of the book is available for free viewing and download on the publisher's webpage.

== Reception ==
On 9 July 2021, Le Monde wrote about the book: "We [...] discover the courage of a young population, in love with freedom, who braved the shootings and the torture to go and demonstrate. The images point to the role of women in the revolution, the intensity and the danger of the demonstrations, but above all this sort of organized utopia constituted by the sit-in, with the endless discussions, the exchange of books, the inventiveness of slogans and songs."

== Exhibitions of photographs ==
In June, 2021, the French website Picto announced an exhibition of photographs from the book at the Institut français of Khartoum, parallel to its presentation of the book Soudan 2019, année zéro in Sudan. This exhibition is also scheduled to be shown in major cities, such as Atbara, El Obeid, Wad Madani, Port Sudan and Nyala.

Running from 4 July to 26 September 2021, the photography festival Rencontres de la photographie at Arles in southern France announced an exhibition on the Sudanese revolution under the title 'Thawra! ثورة Revolution!'. It presented images by some of the Sudanese photographers who contributed to the book Soudan 2019, année zéro.

During this festival, Eythar Gubara, a photographer featured in the book, won a photography award (Prix de la photo Madame Figaro - Arles 2021) for her photo story «Kandakas can't be stopped» by the French women's magazine Madame Figaro, which entailed a forthcoming photo project by Gubara for the magazine. Her pictures of Senegalese fashion model Samb Fatou were published in the magazine's Juli 1st edition in 2022.

== See also ==
- Sudan, Remember Us
- Photography in Sudan - The 2010s and beyond
- Music of Sudan - 2000s to the present
- Kandaka of the Sudanese Revolution
