= Sudanese resistance committees =

Sudanese civil society networks

- لجان المقاومة
- Formation: 2013
- Purpose: grassroots political organising
- Region served: Sudan
- Affiliations: Forces of Freedom and Change
- Website: resistancecommittee.com

The Sudanese resistance committees (Arabic: لجان المقاومة) or neighbourhood committees are informal, grassroots neighbourhood networks of Sudanese residents that started organising civil disobedience campaigns against the government of Omar al-Bashir in 2013 and became a major organised network playing a key role during the Sudanese Revolution.

== Creation ==
In 2013, civil disobedience in protest against the reduction of fuel and gas subsidies during the government of Omar al-Bashir was dealt with by security forces with lethal force, killing 200 protestors and detaining another 200. In response, resistance committees were created groups of typically three to five friends, to organise small-scale civil disobedience activities. The committees developed a loose network during 2013–2016.

In late 2016, the committees organised a 3-day civil disobedience campaign and doctors and pharmacists went on strike over medical costs and "the deteriorating medical environment". This motivated the resistance committees to better organise in 2017 at a national level and to develop their plans for actions. The resistance committees ran a graffiti campaign in 2017 and distributed 20,000 pamphlets regarding issues including water access and government land seizures.

== Structure ==
By May 2019, the Sudanese resistance committees had an elected council at the national level and branches in "many towns" in Sudan. In July 2019, the overall structure remained a "fluid, decentralised network of activists" that was resistant against Sudanese intelligence agencies. The autonomy of local residential committees and coordination between geographically neighbouring areas were factors in the continued effectiveness of the committees during an Internet blackout that followed the 3 June Khartoum massacre.

=== Demographic profile ===
Individuals interviewed by the Middle East Eye argue that the resistance committees were popular among young Sudanese, who felt unrepresented by formal political opposition groups. The committees gave youth "the momentum and inspiration to be part of the revolution and to own their own fate and future."

== 2018–19 Sudanese protests ==
In December 2018, there were 30 active resistance committees in Khartoum. As the 2018–19 Sudanese protests began, inactive groups reactivated and rejoined the network. The network collected paper, tyres and spray cans for their civil disobedience actions.

The Sudanese resistance committees signed the January 2019 Declaration of Freedom and Change Charter (FFC), which called for president Omar al-Bashir to be removed from power.

During the protests, the resistance committees loosely coordinated with the Sudanese Professionals Association (SPA) via online social networking services, while retaining their autonomy. Middle East Eye described the resistance committees as having been "crucial to [the] success" of massive street protests held on 30 June 2019. The 30 June marches, the first major marches since the 3 June Khartoum massacre, aimed, as had many earlier protests, to again put pressure on the Transitional Military Council (TMC) to transfer power to a civilian authority. Earlier in June, the TMC attributed the resistance committees' blocking of roads as the responsibility of the FFC, and argued that the actions were "against the law and norms and [constituted] a full crime against the citizens of violating their freedoms and preventing them from practicing their normal life."

Some of the resistance committees were unsatisfied with the 5 July verbal deal agreed between the FFC and the TMC. Waleed Omar of one of the Omdurman resistance committees stated that the committees "[hadn't] been consulted and [hadn't] been represented". He said that the committees were preparing new protests.

An Ayin media group political analyst interviewed by Middle East Eye described the resistance committees as "one of the main players in the political dynamics of Sudan after the revolution" and that the other key groups were "trying to avoid [the resistance committees'] radical positions towards the revolution."

=== Assassinations ===
According to activists interviewed by Radio Dabanga, Ammar El Dirdeiri of a Fatah district resistance committee and three other leading members of resistance committees were deliberately killed by the Rapid Support Forces and the General Intelligence Service during the 30 June 2019 protest marches.

== October 2021 Sudanese coup d'état ==
Following the 25 October 2021 Sudanese coup d'état, the resistance committees were active in organising protests, including the 17 November nationwide protests in which security forces shot dead 15 protestors.

== Sudanese civil war (2023–present) ==
During the Sudanese civil war (2023–present) between the Rapid Support Forces and the Sudanese Armed Forces, the resistance committees organised logistics support for medical services. The resistance committees coordinated the creation of doctors', nurses' and engineers' committees, helped to provide fuel, electrical supplies and doctors to hospitals, and helped in evacuating civilians from areas of RSF–SAF fighting.

Resistance committee members were active politically in encouraging local communities to avoid siding with either the RSF or the SAF. Resistance committee members sprayed anti-war messages on walls. Hamid Murtada, a resistance committee member, described the resistance committees as having "an important role in raising awareness to their constituencies and in supporting initiatives that [would] end the war immediately".

In addition to the resistance committees, many volunteers have contributed actively to support citizens, with hundreds of young men and women using social media to coordinate transport to evacuate people, the sharing of food and to provide medicine to patients. Despite frequent internet outages, mobile apps have been used or specifically developed to connect people in need.

== See also ==
- Local Coordination Committees of Syria
- Neighbourhood Youth Alliance of Iran
