= MANSAM =

Alliance active in the Sudanese Revolution

Women of Sudanese Civic and Political Groups
- Nickname: MANSAM
- Purpose: women's rights in Sudan
- Location: Sudan
- Key people: Alaa Salah

MANSAM or Women of Sudanese Civic and Political Groups is an alliance of eight political women's groups, 18 civil society organisations, two youth groups and individuals in Sudan that was active in the Sudanese Revolution.

== Creation ==
MANSAM started in August 2018 as a coordination between Sudanese women organising for their rights, who communicated using WhatsApp instant messaging and met in private homes.

== Sudanese Revolution ==
MANSAM played a significant role in the Sudanese Revolution. It was one of the signers of the 1 January declaration that created the Forces of Freedom and Change (FFC), the main broad alliance of organisations, networks and political parties that played a dominating coordinating role in the Sudanese Revolution starting in December 2018. Arrests of MANSAM members in 2019 strengthened the group.

On 2 July 2019, during negotiations between the Transitional Military Council (TMC) and the FFC on behalf of civilian groups, MANSAM stated that women had been excluded from the negotiations, despite women's prominent role in the protests and MANSAM being a member of the FFC. According to Alaa Salah speaking as a member of MANSAM at the 8649th meeting of the United Nations Security Council (UNSC), on 29 October 2019, after "strong advocacy by women's groups", one woman participated in the negotiations.

MANSAM played a role in supporting women's representation in the Abdallah Hamdok Cabinet. On 16 August 2019, MANSAM objected to the "poor representation of women" in proposed memberships of the Sovereignty Council and the transitionary cabinet of ministers, and called for "a minimum of 50% women in leadership roles in government". MANSAM stated that it had provided the FFC leadership with "high [calibre] nominations, in collaboration with the relevant professional associations, only to be faced with a final list that does not include any of our nominations, without further discussion or consultation." MANSAM called women's organisations, women politicians and allies to "raise their voice" in supporting equal representation for women.

=== Alaa Salah's speech at UNSC ===
As a member of MANSAM, which is one of the major Sudanese women's networks that signed the 1 January 2019 Forces of Freedom and Change declaration, Alaa Salah gave a speech at the 29 October 2019 meeting of the United Nations Security Council (UNSC).

Salah stated that despite women often having constituted 70% of protestors, they were "side-lined in the formal political process" of creating transitional institutions. She stated that women's representation in the new governance structure "[fell] far below [their] demand of 50% parity". She argued that "there is no excuse for [women] not to have an equal seat at every single table". She summarised her argument for women's representation stating,

After decades of struggle and all that we risked to peacefully end Bashir's dictatorship—gender inequality is not and will never be acceptable to the women and girls of Sudan. I hope it is equally unacceptable to the members of this Chamber.

— Alaa Salah, Statement to UNSC, 29 October 2019

Salah also called for judicial accountability and disarmament; and for the political process to be inclusive of women, "civil society, resistance groups, ethnic and religious minorities, those who have been displaced, and people with disabilities to lead to sustainable peace".

== Relation to political parties ==
MANSAM grew to become the biggest women's coalition in Sudan, composed of fifty women's groups, among which nine were associated with political parties. Earlier women's movements in Sudan had strong connections with political parties, leading to situations where women active in MANSAM stopped being active in supporting women's rights once they had achieved political positions of power on behalf of their political parties.

In April 2022, Women from the Sudan Revolutionary Front (SRF) left MANSAM, stating that MANSAM wasn't sufficiently supporting national peace around Sudan, was favouring Khartoum politics over the periphery of Sudan, and that "some individuals" were using MANSAM to advance their personal goals. MANSAM made counteraccusations against the Women from the SRF in relation to their actions and consequences in relation to the 2021 Sudan coup d'état.

Relations of MANSAM participants to political parties made it difficult to achieve consensus on policies. According to Sudanese feminist Reem Abbas, after the 2021 coup, MANSAM played more of a role as a "stepping stone" for women seeking political careers rather than an organisation lobbying for women's rights. Abbas stated that, "despite its shortcomings, [MANSAM] still managed to bring women together to align themselves over political parties and coalitions."

== Members ==
- Sudanese Women's Union
- No to Oppression against Women Initiative
- Sudanese Political Women's Association
- Sudanese Women’s Platform
- Sudanese Women Journalists Network
- Female Lawyers Without Borders
- Female Lawyers for Change
- New Sudan Women's Union
- Women against Injustice
- Women against High Prices
- Families of the martyrs of the 28 Ramadan Movement
- Women of the National Umma Party
- Women of the Sudanese Congress Party
- Women of the Sudan Revolutionary Front
- Women of the Center Current for Change
- Women of the New Forces Movement “Haq”

== See also ==
- Sudanese Women's Union
- No to Oppression against Women Initiative
