= No to Oppression against Women Initiative =

Sudanese women's group active during the al-Bashir and Sudanese Revolution eras

No to oppression of women
- مبادرة لا لقهر النساء; Mubadarat La Liqahr al-Nisa'
- Founded: 2009
- Purpose: Women's rights
- Region served: Sudan
- Method: Monitoring, advocacy, legal aid
- Key people: Ihsan Fagiri

The No to Oppression against Women Initiative (Arabic: مبادرة لا لقهر النساء Mubadarat La Liqahr al-Nisa' ), also known as the No to Women's Oppression Initiative, is a Sudanese women's rights group. The group was active during the Omar al-Bashir era and played a significant role during the 2018–2019 Sudanese Revolution.

== Creation ==
The No to Oppression against Women Initiative was created in 2009 to defend women's rights in Sudan after Lubna Ahmed al-Hussein, a female Sudanese journalist working with the United Nations, was arrested for wearing trousers, which was considered by judicial authorities to be a violation of Sharia-based public order law. Hussein was arrested with twelve other women who had also been wearing trousers at a Khartoum restaurant. At the 4 August 2009 trial, two hundred women and men activists demonstrated in protest against the trial and were dispersed by riot police using tear gas, shields and sticks. Ten women had already been flogged for wearing trousers. One of the protest banners at the 4 August protest showed the slogan adopted as the name of the Initiative: "No to oppression against women".

== Members and co-founders ==
- Ihsan Fagiri
- Amal Habani
- Tahani Abass
- Rashida Shamseldein
- Najlaa Norin
- Gomaria Omer
- Amira Osman Hamed

== Aims ==
The Initiative aims to defend women's rights via monitoring rights violations, supporting victims during court hearings, making press releases, organising workshops, providing pro bono lawyers for victims and visiting women in prisons.

== Activities ==
The initiative implements a number of activities across Sudan, such as:

- Monitoring violations
- Advocacy and awareness raising campaign
- Legal aid and specific need support
- Finance and other resources

== Al-Bashir era ==
In August 2014, the National Intelligence and Security Service (NISS) arrested 16 No to Oppression against Women Initiative members who were calling for the release of Mariam al-Mahdi, vice-president of the National Umma Party and daughter of former prime minister Sadiq al-Mahdi.

In 2016, the No to Oppression against Women Initiative documented the sentencing of 15,000 women to flogging, out of a total of 45,000 prosecutions of women under the Public Order Act. The Initiative organised seminars and cultural resistance via festivals.

In early 2018, during a crackdown against human rights activists, NISS summoned four Initiative members, Rashida Shamseldein, Ihsan Fagiri, Najlaa Norin and Gomaria Omer, for interrogation.

== Sudanese Revolution ==
The No to Oppression against Women Initiative was one of the major feminist networks, along with Women of Sudanese Civic and Political Groups, that played a prominent role in the Forces of Freedom and Change (FFC) alliance that coordinated protests and negotiated with the Transitional Military Council during the 2018–2019 Sudanese Revolution.

During the 39-month transition phase to democracy, on behalf of the No to Oppression against Women Initiative, Ihsan Fagiri protested on 22 October 2019 against the men-only nature of the Khartoum massacre investigation commission. She stated that, as many women had been killed or thrown dead into the Nile, 70 women and men had been raped, and three women rape victims had committed suicide after the massacre, women should be represented as commission members.

== See also ==
- Sudanese Women's Union
- MANSAM
