= Sudanese revolution =

2018–2019 protests and political upheaval

- Part of the Second Arab Spring
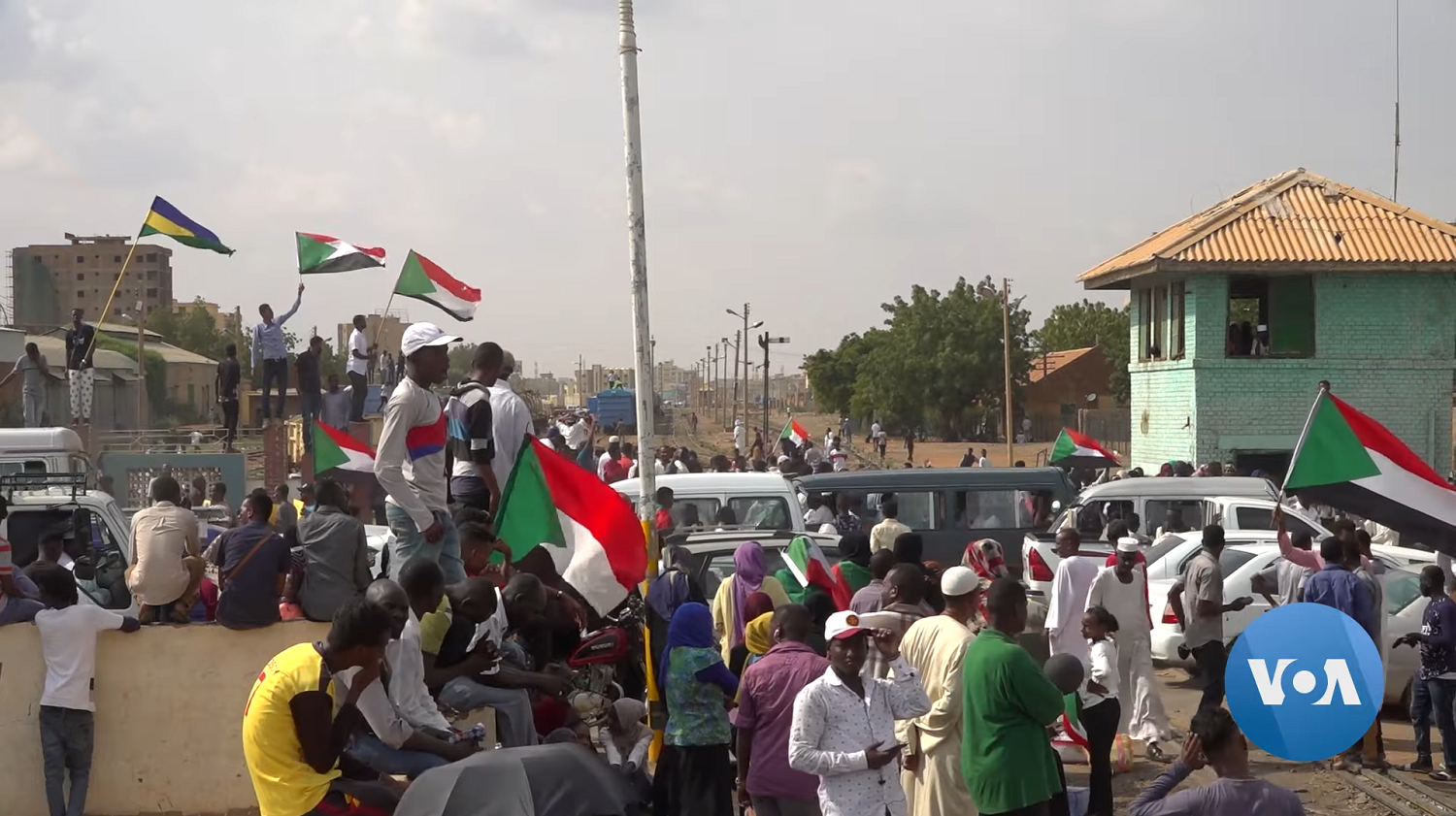
- Sudanese protestors celebrating the 17 August 2019 signing of the Draft Constitutional Declaration between military and civilian representatives
- Date: 19 December 2018 – 18 December 2019 (11 months, 4 weeks and 1 day)
- Caused by: Economic mismanagement and other economic issues (rising costs of basic goods, austerity measures, end to wheat and fuel subsidies, currency devaluation, high inflation, and limits on ATM withdrawals); Authoritarianism (anger at the dictatorship, totalitarianism, militarism, political repression, corruption, and human rights abuses of Omar al-Bashir's government, including violent crackdowns on demonstrators)
- Goals: Resignation of Omar al-Bashir, transition to democracy, and removal of austerity; Democracy, economic reforms, free elections, and human rights
- Methods: Arson, coup d'etat, demonstrations, online activism, riots, sit-ins, and strike action
- Result: Omar al-Bashir imposes state of emergency, dissolves central and regional governments, forms new government, and postpones constitutional amendments that would allow him to run for another term in 2020, without cancelling his candidacy; Following protests, military seizes power in coup d'état; Omar al-Bashir overthrown and arrested on 11 April 2019; Junta leader and de facto head of state Ahmed Awad Ibn Auf, the former defence minister and ally of Omar al-Bashir, steps down after protests and transfers power to Abdel Fattah al-Burhan; Protests continue in the years after, including demand for immediate transition to a civilian government; Khartoum massacre of 128 protesters by Sudanese Armed Forces, Rapid Support Forces and Janjaweed militia on 3 June 2019; Suspension of Sudan from the African Union following Khartoum massacre on 6 June 2019; Political Agreement for a transition to democracy made verbally on 5 July 2019 and in written form on 17 July 2019; Draft Constitutional Declaration signed by the FFC and the TMC on 4 August 2019; Transfer of executive power from TMC to the Sovereignty Council of Sudan, Prime Minister Abdalla Hamdok, Chairman of the Sovereignty Council Abdel Fattah al-Burhan, and Transitional Cabinet in late August–early September and judicial power to Chief Justice Nemat Abdullah Khair in 10 October 2019; Sudanese peace process relaunched in 11 September 2019; Chairman Abdel Fattah al-Burhan executes a self coup and arrests civilian leaders on 25 October 2021; Beginning of the civil war on 15 April 2023

Parties
Forces of Freedom and Change; Sudanese Professionals Association; MANSAM; National Consensus Forces; Sudanese Communist Party; Ba'ath Party – Region of Sudan; Sudan Call; National Umma Party; SRF; Sudanese Congress Party; Unionist Alliance; Sudanese resistance committees	Sudan; Omar al-Bashir's government (until 11 April 2019); National Congress Party (until 11 April 2019); Transitional Military Council (11 April 2019 – 21 August 2019); Sudanese Armed Forces; Rapid Support Forces; Janjaweed; National Intelligence and Security Service

Lead figures
Non-centralised leadership	December 2018 – April 2019; Omar al-Bashir; Mohamed Tahir Ayala; Motazz Moussa; Hemedti; Ahmed Awad Ibn Auf; Salah Gosh; April 2019 – August 2019; Ahmed Awad Ibn Auf (11–12 April); Abdel Fattah al-Burhan

Casualties
- Deaths: 246
- Arrested: 1,200+

The Sudanese revolution (Arabic: الثورة السودانية, romanised: al-Thawrah al-Sūdānīyah) was a major shift of political power in Sudan that started with street protests throughout Sudan on 19 December 2018 and continued with sustained civil disobedience for about eight months, during which the 2019 Sudanese coup d'état deposed President Omar al-Bashir on 11 April after thirty years in power. On 3 June, the Khartoum massacre took place under the leadership of the Transitional Military Council (TMC) that replaced al-Bashir, and in July and August 2019 the TMC and the Forces of Freedom and Change alliance (FFC) signed a Political Agreement and a Draft Constitutional Declaration legally defining a planned 39-month phase of transitional state institutions and procedures to return Sudan to a civilian democracy.

In August and September 2019, the TMC formally transferred executive power to a mixed military–civilian collective head of state, the Sovereignty Council of Sudan, and to a civilian prime minister, Abdalla Hamdok and a mostly civilian cabinet, while judicial power was transferred to Nemat Abdullah Khair, Sudan's first female chief justice. While it is mainly about this eight-month period, there are debates on the definition of the Sudanese revolution, which may also be interpreted to include the period during the prime ministership of Hamdok, who promised that the transitional period would carry out "the program" of the revolution.

== Overview ==
On 19 December 2018, a series of demonstrations broke out in several Sudanese cities, due in part to rising costs of living and deterioration of economic conditions at all levels of society. The protests quickly turned from demands for urgent economic reforms into demands for President Omar al-Bashir to step down.

The violence of the government's reaction to these peaceful demonstrations sparked international concern. On 22 February 2019, al-Bashir declared a state of emergency and dissolved the national and regional governments, replacing the latter with military and intelligence-service officers. On 8 March, al-Bashir announced that all of the women jailed for protesting against the government would be released. On the weekend of 6–7 April, there were massive protests for the first time since the declaration of the state of emergency. On 10 April, soldiers were seen shielding protesters from security forces, and on 11 April, the military removed al-Bashir from power in a coup d'état.

Following al-Bashir's removal from power, street protests organised by the Sudanese Professionals Association and democratic opposition groups continued, calling on the ruling Transitional Military Council (TMC) to "immediately and unconditionally" step aside in favour of a civilian-led transitional government, and urging other reforms in Sudan. Negotiations between the TMC and the civilian opposition to form a joint transition government took place during late April and in May, but stopped when the Rapid Support Forces and other TMC security forces killed 128 people, raped 70 and injured others in the Khartoum massacre on 3 June.

Opposition groups responded to the massacre and post-massacre arrests by carrying out a 3-day general strike from 9–11 June and calling for sustained civil disobedience and nonviolent resistance until the TMC transfers power to a civilian government. On 12 June the opposition agreed to stop the strike and the TMC agreed to free political prisoners.

After renewed negotiations, a deal, called the Political Agreement, was agreed verbally between the TMC and the civilian protesters represented by the Forces of Freedom and Change (FFC) on 5 July 2019 and a written form of the agreement was signed by the TMC and FFC on 17 July. The TMC and FFC announced that they would share power to run Sudan via executive and legislative institutions and a judicial investigation of post-coup events, including the Khartoum massacre, until elections occur in mid-2022. The Political Agreement was complemented by the Draft Constitutional Declaration, which was initially signed by the FFC and the TMC on 4 August 2019 and signed more formally on 17 August. The transition plan creates the Sovereignty Council as head of state, with a mixed civilian–military composition and leadership to be transferred from a military leader to a civilian leader 21 months after the transitional period begins, for a total 39-month transition period leading into elections.

The TMC was dissolved and the mostly male Sovereignty Council was created on 20 August 2019. Abdalla Hamdok was appointed prime minister on 21 August 2019. The Transitional Cabinet, with four female and 14 male civilian ministers and 2 male military ministers, was announced in early September. A "comprehensive peace process" between the Sudanese state and armed opposition groups was scheduled to start on 1 September 2019. Nemat Abdullah Khair was appointed as Sudan's first female Chief Justice on 10 October. Street protests continued during the transitionary period.

== Background ==
Al-Bashir had ruled the country since 1989 when he led a successful coup against the elected, but increasingly unpopular, prime minister of the time, Sadiq al-Mahdi. The International Criminal Court (ICC) has indicted Al-Bashir for war crimes and crimes against humanity in the western region of Darfur.

Since the Bashir regime gained control of the country in 1989, the opposition had been very fierce from all political parties, due to the oppressive "Islamist" policies and heinous human rights violations. Multiple failed coup attempts, protests, and strikes had been dealt with extremely harshly, and key opposition members such as Sadiq al-Mahdi, Amin Mekki Medani, and Farouk Abu Issa were even arrested and expelled from the country. In particular, the 2011–2013 Sudanese protests, which coincided with the Arab Spring, saw a period of heightened protest and repression, as well as shifts in organisational dynamics within the Sudanese opposition and a restructuring of the regime's coercive apparatus. In January 2018, large protests started on the streets of Khartoum, Sudan's capital, in opposition to the rising prices of the basic goods including bread. The protests grew quickly and found support from different opposition parties. Youth and women's movements also joined the protests.

The Sudanese government devalued the local currency and removed wheat and electricity subsidies. Sudan's economy has struggled since Omar al-Bashir's ascent to power, but became increasingly turbulent following the secession of South Sudan in 2011, which, up until then, had represented an important source of foreign currency, because of its oil output. The devaluation of the Sudanese pound in October 2018 led to wildly fluctuating exchange rates and a shortage of cash in circulation. Long lines for basic goods such as petrol, bread, as well as cash from ATMs were a common sight. At the time, Sudan had around 70% inflation, second only to Venezuela.

In August 2018, the National Congress party backed Omar Al-Bashir's 2020 presidential run, despite his increasing unpopularity and his previous declaration that he would not run in the upcoming elections. These measures led to rising opposition from within the party calling for respect of the constitution, which currently prevents Al-Bashir from being reelected. Sudanese activists reacted on social media and called for a campaign against his nomination.

== Terminology ==
The protests and the planned 39-month phase of transitionary institutions were widely referred to as "the revolution" or the "Sudanese revolution". Two earlier Sudanese civil disobedience uprisings that led to major changes of government include the October 1964 Revolution and the March/April 1985 Revolution. Since December 2018, sustained civil disobedience was referred to by protestors as a revolution, with chanted slogans including "Revolution is the people's choice". Women participating in the protests called them a "women's revolution" in March 2019 and following the April 2019 coup d'état, Transitional Military Council chair al-Burhan referred to "the uprising and the revolution". Gilbert Achcar of Jacobin described the transfer of power to the Sovereignty Council and the plan for a 39-month period of transitional institutions as the "fourth phase" of "the revolution". Prime Minister Abdalla Hamdok stated, after taking power in August 2019, that "The revolution's deep-rooted slogan, 'freedom, peace and justice,' will form the program of the transitional period."

The Sudan Revolutionary Front, an alliance of armed groups created in 2011 in opposition to President Omar al-Bashir, argued that the August 2019 creation of the Sovereignty Council was a "hijacking of the revolution", and that the revolution had been started by the armed rebel groups in 2003.

== Opposition groups and figures ==
The Sudanese opposition to al-Bashir was initially fractured, but in January 2019 unified in a coalition called the Forces of Freedom and Change (FFC, or Alliance for Freedom and Change). The Freedom and Change Charter signed by the alliance participants called for the removal of the government and a transition to democracy under a civilian government.

Multiple groups and coalitions were organised at multiple levels. Local grassroots groups that had started organising as a loose network in 2013, called the resistance committees, played a major role in organising civil disobedience and pressuring the TMC.

One of the key groups active in coordinating the protests is the Sudanese Professionals Association. The group is a civil society organisation and an umbrella group of trade unions for professionals. The group is composed of doctors, engineers, teachers, lawyers, journalists, pharmacists, and others. The group, established in 2012, operated mostly clandestinely during al-Bashir's regime in order to avoid arrest. The core of the group consists of urban middle-class professionals.

Other Sudanese opposition groups include the Sudan Call (Nidaa Sudan in Arabic), a movement founded by many political figures including, Farouk Abu Issa and Dr. Amin Mekki Medani, (and included the Umma Party, the Sudanese Congress Party, the Sudan Revolutionary Front) and the National Consensus Forces (consisting of the Sudanese Communist Party and the Arab Socialist Ba'ath Party – Region of Sudan).

Jacobin described the political movement organised by the Sudanese opposition groups as "perhaps the best organized and politically advanced in the [Middle East/North Africa] region".

=== Women's activism ===
The 1 January declaration that created the FFC included major women's groups: the Sudanese Women's Union, No to Oppression against Women Initiative, and the MANSAM coalition (Women of Sudanese Civic and Political Groups). Women played a major role in the protests, sometimes constituting 70% of the daily street protestors. In August 2019, during the Sudanese transition to democracy period that followed the first 2018–2019 civil disobedience, coup and massacre phases of the Sudanese revolution, these organisation argued that since women had played as significant a role in the revolution as men, positions chosen by civilian–military consensus in the Cabinet of Ministers should be allotted equally between men and women, stating that Sudanese women "claim an equal share of 50–50 with men at all levels, measured by qualifications and capabilities".

== Timeline ==
=== December 2018 ===
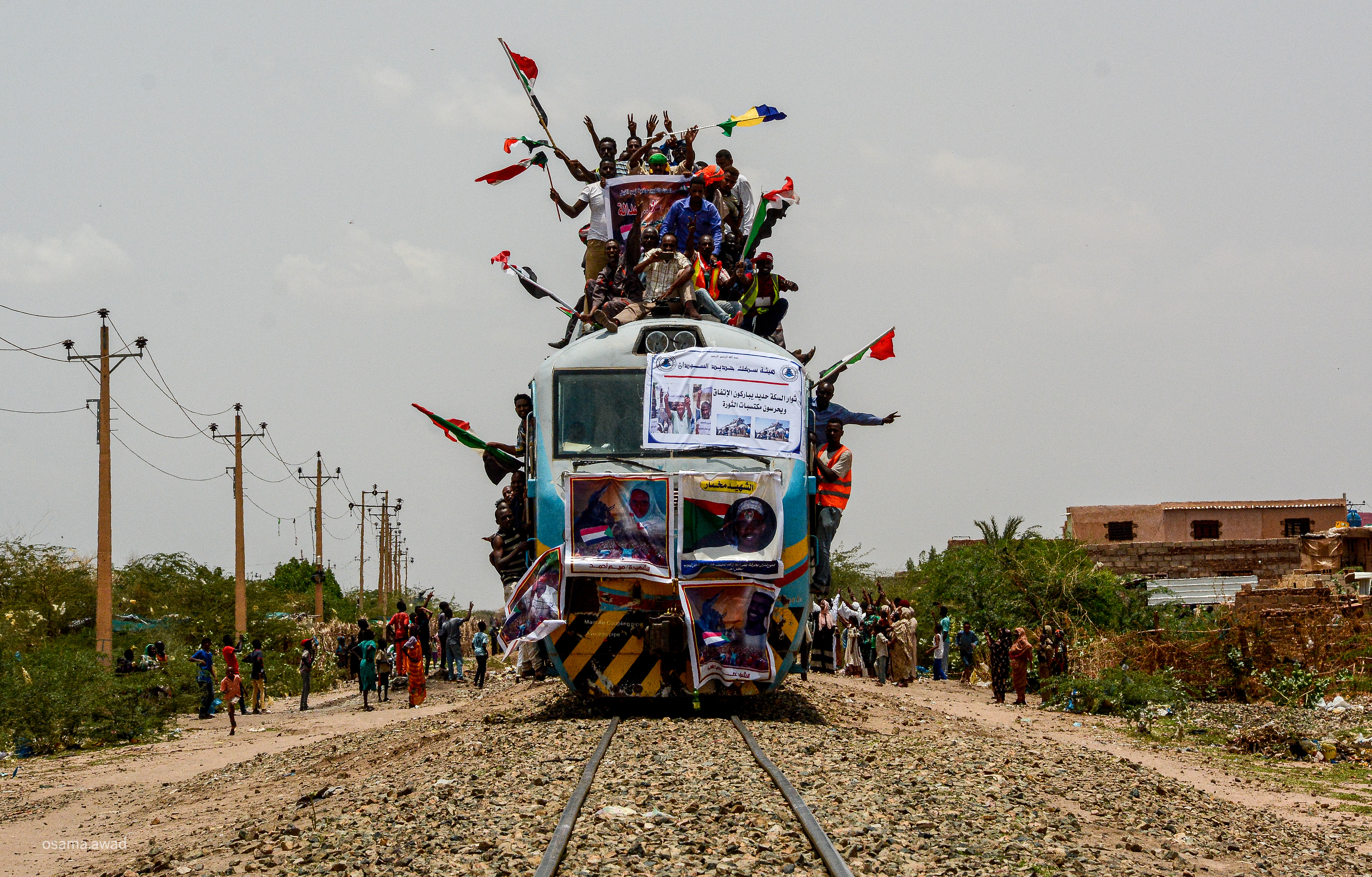
Protesters on the train from Atbara to Khartoum

The 2018–2019 wave of protests began on 19 December 2018 in response to the tripling of the price of bread in Atbara, then quickly spread to Port Sudan, Dongola and the capital Khartoum. Protestors set fire to the national party headquarters in Atbara and Dongola. Authorities used tear gas, rubber bullets and live ammunition to disperse demonstrators, causing dozens of deaths and injuries. The former prime minister, Sadiq al-Mahdi, returned to the country on the same day.

Access to social media and instant messaging was cut on 21 December by the country's major service providers, with technical evidence collected by the NetBlocks internet observatory and Sudanese volunteers indicating the installation of "an extensive Internet censorship regime". Curfews were issued across Sudan, with schools closed throughout the country. Darfuri students in Sennar and Khartoum were arrested by the National Intelligence and Security Service (NISS) and tortured into confessing membership in the Sudan Liberation Movement in an effort to create a narrative that the protests were race-based. These forced confessions were broadcast on both Sudanese state television and Facebook on 29 December.

=== January 2019 ===
The generals' position has been strengthened by the security forces' use of force. In the worst of these instances, a crackdown on protestors in the capital city of Khartoum on June 3 resulted in the deaths of dozens of people, some of whose remains were dumped into the River Nile. On the same day, Mohamed Nagi Alassam, SPA secretary, delivered a statement demanding the government to step-down. He and over 100 opposition members were arrested the next day.

By 7 January 2019 over 800 anti-government protesters were arrested and 19 people, including security officials, were killed during the protests.

On 9 January, thousands of protesters gathered in the southeastern city of El-Gadarif.

Protests organised by the Sudanese Professionals Association led to a doctor being shot on 17 January, as hospitals were being targeted by security forces.

The erstwhile allies of Bashir, the National Congress Party, announced that it was withdrawing from the government and later called on for a transfer of power to a transitional government, signalling at least that even in the ruling establishment, there was fatigue from the rule of Bashir.

=== February 2019 ===
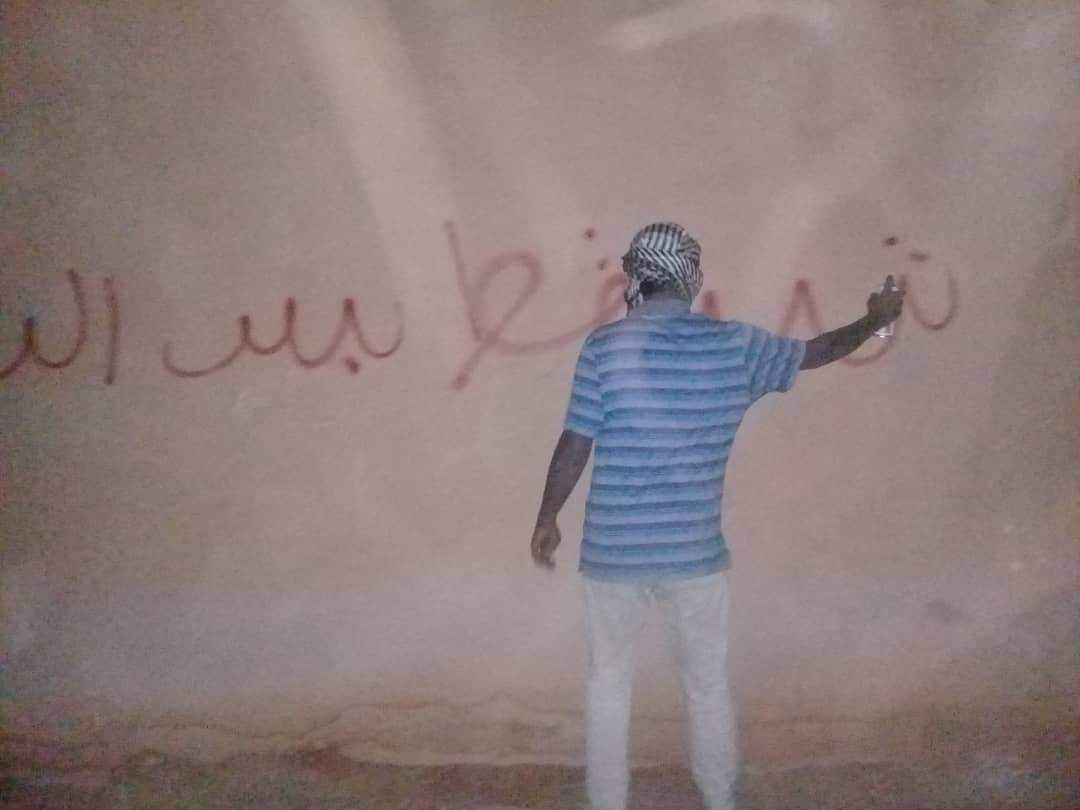
A Sudanese sprays a revolutionary slogan at a wall

Media coverage of the protests was strictly controlled by security forces. Al Tayyar began printing blank pages to show the amount of government-censored copy. Other news outlets have seen their entire print run confiscated by the government. The security service (NISS) raided Al Jarida's offices again, which has led the latter to stop producing its print version. According to The Listening Post, foreign Arabic-language videographers have been particularly targeted by the government.

A "senior military source" told Middle East Eye that Salah Gosh, head of Sudanese intelligence, had the support of the UAE, Saudi Arabia, and Egypt to replace al-Bashir as president, citing his private talks with Yossi Cohen at the Munich Security Conference as evidence (15–17 February).

On 22 February, Bashir declared a yearlong state of national emergency, the first in twenty years. Bashir also announced the dissolution of the central governments and the regional governments, and replaced regional governors with military generals. The next day he appointed his chosen successor, Mohamed Tahir Ayala, as prime minister and former intelligence chief and current Defence Minister Awad Mohamed Ahmed Ibn Auf as first vice-president. His intelligence chief also announced that he would not seek re-election in 2020 and would resign from the head of the National Congress Party. Ahmed Haroun, also wanted by the ICC for war crimes, replaced Al-Bashir as leader of the National Congress party. Officers from the military and intelligence services were put in charge of provincial governments after the dissolution.

Security forces raided universities in Khartoum and Omdurman, reportedly beating students with sticks in Khartoum on 24 February. On the same day, al-Bashir issued decrees banning unauthorised demonstrations, prohibiting the illegal trade of fuel and wheat under threat of 10-year prison sentences; banning the "unauthorized circulation of information, photos or documents that belong to the president's family"; and introducing capital controls on the trade of gold and foreign currency.

=== March 2019 ===
On 7 March, protests were organised to honour women for their leading role in the uprising. "You women, be strong" and "This revolution is a women's revolution" were slogans chanted at several protests.

On 8 March, Omar al-Bashir ordered that all the women who had been arrested for participating in anti-government demonstrations be freed. Protestors named a Khartoum neighbourhood park (in Burri) after one such woman, who had been sentenced to 20 lashes and one month in prison by an emergency court, then freed on appeal. The sentence of flogging, first introduced during British colonisation in 1925, aims at discouraging Sudanese women from political activism.

According to the Democratic Lawyers Alliance, at least 870 people had been tried in the newly-established emergency courts by mid-March.

=== 6-10 April 2019 ===
Women participation during the revolution was key to its success (photo: Kandake of the Sudanese Revolution by Lana H. Haroun).

On 6 April, days after Abdelaziz Bouteflika was forced to step down to appease Algerian protesters, the Sudanese Professionals Association called for a march to the headquarters of the armed forces. Hundreds of thousands of people answered the call. According to one protester, divisions appeared between the security forces, who "tried to attack the demonstrators coming from the north", and the military, who "took the demonstrators' side and fired back." On Sunday, Social media were blocked and the power was cut all over Sudan as the protestors began a sit-in at the military headquarters in Khartoum which continued throughout the week. On Monday morning (8 April), the army and the rapid reaction force of the secret services were facing off at the armed forces headquarters in Khartoum. According to the interior minister, there were six deaths, 57 injuries, and 2,500 arrests in Khartoum over the weekend. Police were under orders not to intervene.

Also on Monday, Alaa Salah, a young woman who has since been dubbed as the kandake, became a symbol of the movement when a photo of her leading the protestors in a chant while standing on top of a car went viral.

=== 11 April: al-Bashir deposed ===
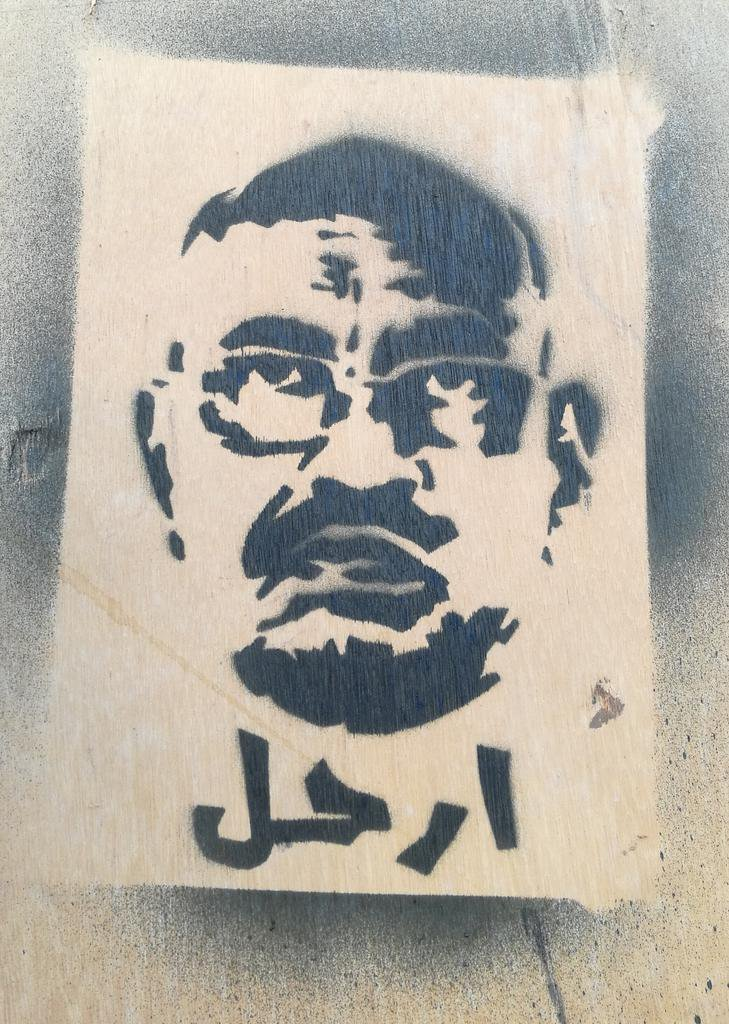
Anti-Omar al-Bashir revolutionary street stencil in Khartoum.

On 11 April, al-Bashir was ousted from presidency and placed under house arrest by the military. The European Union and the United States called for a UN Security Council meeting. State media reported that all political prisoners, including anti-Bashir protest leaders, were being released from jail. A curfew was also put in place between 10 pm and 4 am. Despite the imposed curfew, protesters remained on the streets.

=== 12 April – 2 June: negotiations with Transitional Military Council ===
On the evening of 12 April, the head of the Transitional Military Council in Sudan, Awad Ibn Auf, announced his resignation following intense protests. Ibn Auf said that he had chosen Lieutenant-General Abdel Fattah al-Burhan, the army's inspector-general, to succeed him. The protesters were "jubilant" upon hearing this announcement as he was one of the generals who reached out to the protestors during the sit-in. Burhan is also "not known to be implicated in war crimes or wanted by international courts."

On 13 April, talks between the military and the protestors officially started. This came following announcements that the curfew imposed by Auf was lifted, that an order was issued to complete the release of those who were jailed under emergency laws issued by al-Bashir. It was also announced that intelligence and security chief Salah Gosh had resigned. Amnesty International asked the military coalition to investigate his role in protesters' deaths.

On 14 April it was announced that the council had agreed to have the protestors nominate a civilian prime minister and have civilians run every Government ministry outside the Defence and Interior Ministries. The same day, military council spokesman Shams El Din Kabbashi Shinto announced that Auf had been removed as Defence Minister and that Lt. General Abu Bakr Mustafa had been named to succeed Gosh as chief of Sudan's National Intelligence and Security Service (NISS).

On 15 April, military council spokesman Shams al-Din Kabbashi announced "The former ruling National Congress Party (NCP) will not participate in any transitional government," despite not being barred from future elections. The same day, prominent activist Mohammed Naji al-Asam announced that trust was also growing between the military and the protestors following more talks and the release of more political prisoners, despite a poorly organised attempt by the army to disperse the sit-in. It was also announced that the military council was undergoing restructuring, which began with the appointments of Colonel General Hashem Abdel Muttalib Ahmed Babakr as army chief of staff and Colonel General Mohamed Othman al-Hussein as deputy chief of staff.

On 16 April, the military council announced that Burhan once again cooperated with the demands of the protestors and sacked the nation's three top prosecutors, including chief prosecutor Omar Ahmed Mohamed Abdelsalam, public prosecutor Amer Ibrahim Majid, and deputy public prosecutor Hesham Othman Ibrahim Saleh. The same day, two sources with direct knowledge told CNN that Bashir, his former interior minister Abdelrahim Mohamed Hussein, and Ahmed Haroun, the former head of the ruling party, will be charged with corruption and the death of protesters.

On 17 April, al-Bashir was transferred from house arrest in the Presidential Palace to solitary confinement at the maximum-security Kobar Prison in Khartoum, a prison notorious for holding political prisoners during al-Bashir's time in power. Military council spokesman Shams Eldin Kabashi said that two of al-Bashir's brothers, Abdullah and Alabas, had also been arrested.

On 18 April, crowds numbering in the hundreds of thousands demonstrated to demand civilian rule. The demonstration was the largest since al-Bashir was deposed. Protest leaders also announced plans to name their own transitional council in two days' time if the military junta refused to step aside.

On 20 April, an anonymous judicial source said that officials had found suitcases full of Euros, US dollars, and Sudanese Pounds in al-Bashir's home (totalling around $6.7 million). Current Parliament Speaker Ibrahim Ahmed Omar and presidential aide Nafie Ali Nafie were placed under house arrest; the secretary general of the Islamic movement Al-Zubair Ahmed Hassan and former parliament speaker Ahmed Ibrahim al-Taher were also among those arrested in relation to these suitcases.

On 21 April, Abdel Fattah al-Burhan called the transitional military council "complementary to the uprising and the revolution" and promised that it was "committed to handing over power to the people." Nevertheless, protest leaders broke off talks with the military authorities the same day—saying that the military junta was not serious about transferring power to civilians and that the junta was composed of remnants of al-Bashir's Islamist regime—and vowed to intensify demonstrations. The governments of Saudi Arabia and the United Arab Emirates pledged $3 billion in aid to the military authorities, which protestors called upon the council to reject, with some even suggesting severing diplomatic ties with both historical allies. Meanwhile, as a result of strikes at oil companies in Port Sudan, landlocked South Sudan's oil exports were paralysed.

On Wednesday 24 April, three members of the Transitional Military Council (political committee chair Omar Zain al-Abideen, Lieutenant-General Jalal al-Deen al-Sheikh and Lieutenant-General Al-Tayeb Babakr Ali Fadeel) submitted their resignations in response to protestors' demands. On Saturday 27 April, an agreement was reached to form a transitional council made up jointly of civilians and military, though the exact details of the power-sharing arrangement were not yet agreed upon, as both sides wanted to have a majority. The military also announced the resignation of the three military council generals.

On 7 May 2019, 21 former officials who served in al-Bashir's National Democratic Alliance (NDA) in South Darfur were arrested after attempting to flee the country. On 8 May, it was revealed that some of the South Darfur officials who arrested were women.

Qatari-based Al Jazeera announced the Sudanese authorities had revoked their right to broadcast from Sudan on 30 May 2019. Two civilian deaths were reported the same day. The Transitional Military Council cracked down on the "Columbia" neighbourhood in North Khartoum where the drug, alcohol and sex trades have become more open during the transition. Rapid Support Forces and police reportedly fired live ammunition, resulting in casualties (1 dead, 10 wounded).

=== 3–11 June: Khartoum massacre and civil disobedience ===
Tensions continued to rise and on 3 June 2019, 118 people were killed, 70 were raped and hundreds were injured in the Khartoum massacre as a result of Sudanese armed forces storming a camp and opening fire on protesters. Security forces also opened fire on protesters inside medical facilities. Security forces dumped bodies of some of the killed protesters in the river Nile.

The following day, the Sudanese Professionals Association (SPA) called for "complete civil disobedience" to close down streets and bridges and "open political strike" in all workplaces in Sudan, using the techniques of nonviolent resistance against the TMC.

On 8 June, the SPA warned of a wide campaign by the TMC of arresting and disappearing political activists or threatening to kill them. The SPA called for activists to strictly follow the methods of nonviolent resistance in their campaign of civil disobedience and workplace strikes.

A 3-day general strike and nationwide civil disobedience campaign were carried out from 9–11 June. The SPA estimated 60–95% pupils' and teachers' absences from primary and high schools; 67–99% closure of municipal and national bus transport; 84–99% blocking of flights; 98–100% blocking of rail transport; 64–72% bank closures; 86% closure of retail markets; 60–94% closure of electricity, heating, oil and gas stations; 57–100% non-publication of newspaper publishing; 47–90% of medical services were closed, but free emergency medical care was provided; 90–100% of private and state legal services were shut down. NISS and Huawei forcefully shutdown the Internet at the level of 63–100% (levels varying per provider).

=== 12 June – 4 July: negotiations and protests ===
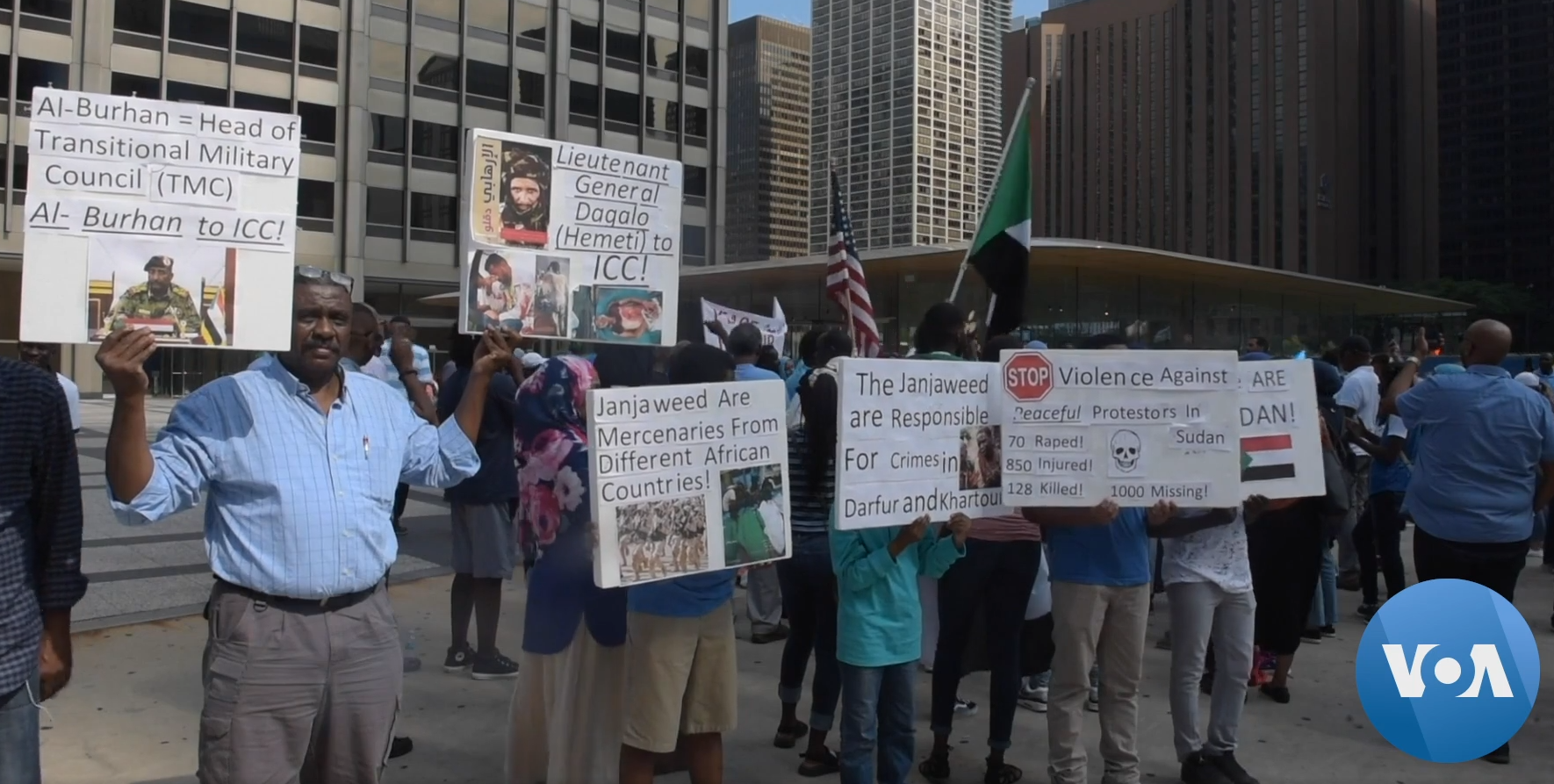
People in Chicago show solidarity with protesters in Sudan, July 2019

Negotiations to form a government, small protests, and a government-imposed Internet blockade continued during much of June.

On 12 June, the TMC agreed to release political prisoners and the Forces of Freedom and Change alliance (FFC) agreed to suspend the general strike, according to the Ethiopian mediator Mahmoud Drir. The two sides also agreed "to resume talks soon" about forming a civilian government.

On 12 June, the FFC prepared a list of eight civilian members for a 15-member transitional governmental council, including three women, in addition to Abdalla Hamdok, who was Deputy Executive Secretary of the United Nations Economic Commission for Africa from 2011 to October 2018, as prime minister.

On 13 June, TMC spokesperson Shams El Din Kabbashi stated that "some" security force members had been arrested over 3 June massacre and that eighteen people, members of two different groups planning coups against the TMC, had also been arrested.

On 29 June, TMC security forces raided the headquarters of the Sudanese Professionals Association, preventing a press conference from taking place.

On 30 June, the thirtieth anniversary of al-Bashir's coup d'état, at least tens of thousands of people protested in Khartoum and elsewhere around Sudan to call for civilian rule and justice for 3 June massacre. Ten people were killed during the demonstrations, including one shot dead by security forces in Atbara, and according to the Health Ministry, 181 people were injured among which 27 suffered gunshot wounds. Tear gas, live ammunition and stun grenades were used against protestors in Khartoum and in El-Gadarif. Ahmed Rabie of the opposition attributed all the deaths to the TMC, stating, "We hold the TMC responsible because those who were killed were shot under the eyes of the security forces, which either killed them or failed to protect them." The TMC attributed responsibility for the deaths to the protestors. General Gamal Omar of the TMC said that people who fired at security forces, killing two and wounding three, were arrested by the RSF.

On 3 July, direct talks between the TMC and the DFCF resumed after mediation by the African Union and Ethiopia.

=== 5–28 July: political agreement and negotiations ===
On 5 July, with the help of African Union and Ethiopian mediators, a verbal deal was reached by the TMC and civilian negotiators of the FFC, including Siddig Yousif, on the formation of governmental institutions, under which the presidency of the transitional government would rotate between the military and civilians. The deal agreed to by the TMC and the civilian negotiators included:

- the creation of an 11-member sovereign council with five military members and five civilians to be chosen by the two sides and a civilian to be agreed upon mutually;
- a transition period of 3 years and 3 months, led by a military member for the first 21 months and a civilian for the following 18 months;
- a cabinet of ministers to be appointed by the FFC;
- a legislative council to be formed after the creation of the sovereign council and cabinet;
- the creation of a "transparent and independent investigation" into events following the 2019 Sudanese coup d'état, including the Khartoum massacre;
- a committee of lawyers, including African Union lawyers, to formalise the deal within 48 hours;
- democratic elections to determine leadership following the 39-month transition period.

Tahani Abbas, a cofounder of No to Oppression against Women Initiative, stated her worry that women might be excluded from the transition institutions, arguing that women "[bear] the brunt of the violence, [face] sexual harassment and rape" and were active in organising the protests. On 9 July, a 4-member committee, including Yahia al-Hussein, was still drafting the written form of the agreement. The committee expected it to be signed in the presence of regional leaders within 10 days. While waiting for the written agreement to be prepared and signed, the Internet in Sudan continued to be mostly blocked. TMC spokesperson Shams al-Din Kabbashi claimed on 7 July that the Internet ban was necessary to protect the transition deal, since groups opposed to the deal planned to misrepresent it. He promised to restore the Internet within "two or three days". United Nations human rights experts Aristide Nononsi, Clement Nyaletsossi Voule and David Kaey stated that the Internet ban was a violation of international human rights law and not justified under any circumstances.

On 17 July 2019, the agreement was formalised with the signing by the TMC and the FFC of a written document in front of international witnesses. A constitutional declaration remained to be prepared to complete the definition of the transition period.

On 27 July, while negotiations on the constitutional declaration continued, the head of a committee appointed by the TMC to investigate the Khartoum massacre, Fathelrahman Saeed, stated that 87 people had been killed, 168 injured, no rapes had occurred and no tents had been burnt. Saeed stated that legal cases for crimes against humanity had been launched against eight unnamed high-ranking security officers. The Sudan Forensic Doctors Union described the result of the enquiry as "poor and defective", and the FFC, the Sudanese Women's Union, the Sudanese Professionals Association and the Democratic Lawyers' Alliance rejected the report. Street protests took place in Khartoum in response to the report.

=== 29 July – El Obeid massacre to Constitutional Declaration ===
4 August signed Constitutional Declaration

On 29 July the Rapid Support Forces (RSF) shot live ammunition at students in El-Obeid protesting about "the stoppage of public transport due to fuel shortages, drinking water outages, increasing commodity prices, and the unavailability of bread". Four students and another protestor died immediately and 40 to 50 were wounded, among which eight were in a serious condition. Twenty thousand people demonstrated in Khartoum in protest against the killings on the afternoon and evening of the same day. The FFC team negotiating with the TMC for a constitutional declaration suspended negotiations and instead travelled to El-Obeid to "assess the situation". Seven RSF members were arrested and an investigation was planned by the North Kordofan Attorney General. The TMC stated that the RSF members responsible for the shooting had been guarding a bank and been assaulted with stones, with nine RSF members, three soldiers from the regular army and a policeman injured.

On 1 August, another massacre occurred, in which four protestors were shot dead in Umbada in Omdurman by "government forces" in four-wheel-drive vehicles.

Sudan Change Now, a member of the FFC, posted a statement of position on the constitutional negotiation process on 16 July 2019, accusing the TMC of manipulating the negotiation process and demanding prosecution of those involved in all massacres, liquidation of the militias, legal reform, and representation for all of the armed struggle movements in the political agreement.

The TMC, represented by Mohamed Hamdan Dagalo ("Hemetti"), and the FFC, represented by Ahmed Rabee, signed the Draft Constitutional Declaration on 4 August 2019. The Draft Constitutional Declaration, together with 17 July Political Agreement, defines a Sovereignty Council of five civilians, five military, and a civilian mutually acceptable to the TMC and FFC, along with other transitional state bodies and procedures, for a 39-month transition period.

=== October 2019: Transitional institutions ===
Dissolution of the TMC and appointment of the Sovereignty Council, all male except for two women, took place on 20 August 2019. Abdalla Hamdok was appointed prime minister on 21 August. Abdel Fattah al-Burhan became Chairman of the Sovereignty Council from 21 August 2019. A "comprehensive peace process" with armed opposition groups began on 1 September 2019. On September 12 thousands of protesters gathered outside the presidential palace in Khartoum to demand a stronger judiciary to bring justice for the unjust torture of the protesters. Nemat Abdullah Khair was appointed Chief Justice on 10 October 2019 with promises of an efficient judiciary body, restoring order in the process.

Exclusion of women

The Sovereignty Council is almost completely male, with only two women members: Aisha Musa el-Said and Raja Nicola. The new Chief Justice appointed on 10 October 2019, Nemat Abdullah Khair, who heads the judiciary and the Supreme Court, is a woman. The candidates initially proposed by the FFC for the Cabinet of Ministers included very few women. The Sudanese Women's Union (SWU) argued on 18 August that women had played as significant a role as men in "the revolution" of 2019 and that Sudanese women "claim an equal share of 50-50 with men at all levels, measured by qualifications and capabilities". Channel 4 reporter Yousra Elbagir criticised the beginning steps of the transition procedures, stating, "For the [first] tangible political progress of decades to exclude women is ridiculous. ... Women were the reason that the mass pro-democracy sit-in was able to continue for nearly two months. They ran make-shift clinics, fed fasting protesters daily during Ramadan, they spent the night at check points searching female protesters."

On 22 August, the SWU organised a protest in front of the SPA's Khartoum office, advocating for a 50% representation of women "at all levels of power and decision-making bodies". The SWU interpreted the Draft Constitutional Declaration to ensure that women would be guaranteed at least 40% of seats at every level of government. Some of the protesters held banners stating "We are also technocrats!" in response to proposals that the Cabinet of Ministers be composed of technocrats.

=== Transition period protests ===
Small scale protests occurred during the transition period, on issues that included the nomination of a new Chief Justice of Sudan and Attorney-General, killings of civilians by the Rapid Support Forces (RSF), the toxic effects of cyanide and mercury from gold mining in Northern state and South Kordofan, protests against a state governor in el-Gadarif and against show trials of Sudanese Professionals Association (SPA) coordinators, and for officials of the previous government to be dismissed in Red Sea and White Nile.

== Popular art and slogans ==
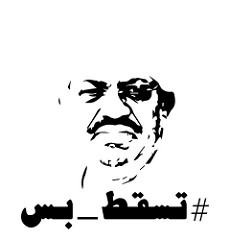
Slogan "Tasgut bas" (Just fall, that's all!) or down with the government as graphic art during the revolution

Before, during and after the revolution, poems, songs, passionate speeches, paintings and caricatures have been produced by artists in Sudan as well as in the Sudanese diaspora to "inspire, enlighten, and share energy", as Sudanese writer Lemya Shammat wrote in her article on the 'Popular Art and Poetry of Sudanese Protesters'.

International media have also highlighted the role of women and female artists as important activists in the revolution. In an article named 'How Sudanese Art Is Fueling the Revolution', graphic artist Enas Satir was quoted saying, "the power that art has, whether it be an illustration or otherwise, has a huge impact on people. Our role is to create art that cannot be ignored."

Similar to other protests in the Middle East and North Africa, Sudanese protestors have chanted slogans demanding the fall of the current regime. These slogans include "Freedom, peace and justice," "We are all Darfur," and "Just fall – that's all", among others.

=== Just fall – that's all ===
The slogan "Just fall – that's all" (تسقط – بس tasquṭ bas) was first used on Twitter and Facebook pages during the protests of 22 December 2018 and has thereafter been widely used.

=== Freedom, peace and justice ===
This slogan was the first to be used in downtown Khartoum where demonstrators chanting "freedom, peace and justice" and "revolution is the people's choice" were met with tear gas. The organisers of this particular march were members of academic professions, including doctors, engineers, and teachers.

=== We are all Darfur ===
The slogan "You arrogant racist, we are all Darfur!" was used in Khartoum in response to the targeting of 32 Darfuri students by National Intelligence and Security Service (NISS) agents, who alleged they were planning an attack. According to Radio Dabanga, the NISS claimed that they had been trained by the Israeli Mossad to carry out acts of sabotage. The students were arrested at the University of Sennar and were transported to Khartoum, where they subsequently confessed "under duress." The Darfur Bar Association called for the students to be released.

=== Book Soudan 2019, année zéro ===
In May 2021, the book Soudan 2019, année zéro (transl. Sudan 2019, year zero) was published in French by Soleb and Bleu autour publishers, documenting the critical days of the sit-in during March and April 2019. It was edited and written by Jean-Nicolas Bach, a French political scientist, with contributions by the director of the French cultural institute in Khartoum, Fabrice Mongiat, as well as by Sudanese social scientists and poets. Moreover, the book presents reports by witnesses, poems and images by Sudanese photographers, who documented these events.

== Reactions ==
=== International organisations ===
- On 28 December 2018, two United Nations Special Rapporteurs expressed alarm about reports of government violence (using live ammunition) against protestors and concern about "arbitrary arrests and detentions".
- On 16 April 2019, the African Union announced that Sudan would be removed from its membership unless a civilian government were appointed within two weeks. On 23 April, this position was revised at a meeting in Cairo, during which the Union instead gave the transitional military council three months to organise elections.

=== Arab states ===
- Egypt – Egypt sent its minister of foreign affairs Sameh Shoukry to become the first Arab official to announce its support of the Sudanese government. "Egypt is confident that Sudan will overcome the present situation," Shoukry said, adding that "Egypt is always ready to support Sudan and the ability of Sudanese people as per the government of Sudan's vision and policies."
- Qatar – The Emir of Qatar Tamim bin Hammad declared his support to Omar al-Bashir, whose first international trip since the uprising began was to visit the Emir seeking economic, diplomatic and military support al-Bashir was also looking for an immediate and urgent financial support in order to ease the pressure on him . No financial support was announced after this meeting.
- Saudi Arabia – King Salman of Saudi Arabia has sent a diplomatic delegation calling for the stability of Sudan and stating that the security of Sudan is part of the security of the (Saudi) kingdom itself.
- United Arab Emirates – The UAE has announced plans to support the shortages of the Sudanese economy and provided 1.12 million tonnes of fuel and allocated $300 million to finance Sudan's agriculture.
- Saudi Arabia & United Arab Emirates pledged 3 billion in aid on 21 April and the Kuwaiti-based Arab Fund for Economic and Social Development lent $200m to the Sudanese government.

=== Other states ===
- Norway, United Kingdom, United States – On 10 April, issued a statement urging the government to heed the protesters calls for political transition: "The Sudanese people are demanding a transition to a political system that is inclusive and has greater legitimacy. The Sudanese authorities must now respond and deliver a credible plan for political transition. Failing to do so risks causing greater instability. The Sudanese leadership has a grave responsibility to avoid such an outcome."
- Turkey, Russia – offered fuel and wheat, according to Sudan's Oil Minister.
- United Kingdom – On 14 January, British ambassador to Sudan Irfan Siddiq said he urged the Sudanese government to avoid violence with the protesters and to release the political detainees saying "No more use of force, credible investigations into killings, release of political detainees, freedom of media and respect for the sanctity of hospitals and work of medics all essential steps."
- United States – On 23 January, the United States announced its concern over the arrests and detentions, calling for the Sudanese government to release journalists, activists, and peaceful protesters arbitrarily detained during the protests, State Department spokesman Robert Palladino announced "We call on the government to allow for a credible and independent investigation into the deaths and injuries of protesters." On 19 April, the U.S. government called on the Sudanese military to give way to a civilian-led transitional government "that is inclusive and respectful of human rights and the rule of law."

== Aftermath ==
On 14 January 2020, the Sudanese Armed Forces quelled a mutiny by soldiers loyal to ousted President Omar al-Bashir in the capital Khartoum. Former Director of the National Intelligence and Security Service, Salah Gosh, was accused of orchestrating the mutiny, which left two troops dead.

On 9 March, a blast went off close to the convoy of the prime minister of Sudan Abdalla Hamdok, but he escaped unharmed from what was seen as an obvious assassination attempt, according to The Guardian. Those responsible for carrying out the attack have not been identified yet, the BBC added. Mr Hamdok, with absolute certainty, maintained that the assassination attempt is not going to interfere or stop the transition in Sudan, but encourage it instead.

Sudan has made significant democratic gains since the revolution, which have been commended by international human rights organisations. For example, the Sudanese government repealed the notorious public order law, which allowed the police to beat women who wear pants (trousers). As of July 2020, Sudan banned female genital mutilation, decriminalised apostasy, ended public flogging and lifted a 36-year ban on the consumption of alcohol for non-Muslims, according to Justice Minister Nasreldin Abdelbari. Press freedom has also noticeably improved, indicated by Sudan moving 16 places up in the World Press Freedom Index. The government also took steps to improve the situation of the Christian minorities in the country. The freedom of private discussion has improved, as the new government began the process of dismantling the surveillance state of the Al-Bashir era.

However, inflation remains very high. A lack of foreign currency, huge public debt and soaring commodity prices are pressing issues of the country.

On 25 October 2021, the Sudanese military, led by General Abdel Fattah al-Burhan, took control of the government in a military coup.

== In popular culture ==
- Sudan, Remember Us, a 2024 documentary film directed by Hind Meddeb

== See also ==
- 2011–2013 Sudanese protests
- National Congress Party (Sudan)
- National Islamic Front
- 2019 Egyptian protests
- List of protests in the 21st century
- 2018 Sudanese protests
- War in Sudan (2023)
