= Forces of Freedom and Change =

Sudanese electoral alliance

Forces of Freedom and Change قوى إعلان الحرية والتغيير
- Abbreviation: FFC
- Leader: Central Council
- Founded: 1 January 2019
- Ideology: Anti-authoritarianism; Democratisation; Women's rights
- Political position: Big tent
- Members: SRF; SPA; NCF; SRC; MANSAM; MLN; Sudan Call
- Colours: Green; Maroon

Website
- Facebook page

The Forces of Freedom and Change (FFC, also Alliance for Freedom and Change, or AFC, and Declaration of Freedom and Change, or DFC; Arabic: قوى إعلان الحرية والتغيير) is a wide political coalition of civilian and rebel coalitions of Sudanese groups, including the Sudanese Professionals Association, No to Oppression against Women Initiative, MANSAM, the Sudan Revolutionary Front, the National Consensus Forces, Sudan Call, the Unionist Gathering, and the Sudanese resistance committees, created in January 2019 during the 2018–19 Sudanese protests. The FFC drafted a "Declaration of Freedom and Change" and "Freedom and Change Charter" which called for president Omar al-Bashir to be removed from power, which occurred after several more months of protest in the April 2019 Sudanese coup d'état. The FFC continued coordinating protest actions, and in July 2019, negotiated a power-sharing plan with the Transitional Military Council (TMC) for a transition to return to democracy. The agreement was signed on 17 July 2019.

== Creation and composition ==
The 2018–19 Sudanese protests had already lasted several weeks when a wide array of civilian and rebel coalitions of Sudanese groups, including the Sudanese Professionals Association, No to Oppression against Women Initiative, MANSAM, the Sudan Revolutionary Front, the National Consensus Forces, Sudan Call, the Unionist Gathering, and the Sudanese resistance committees, drafted and signed a "Declaration of Freedom and Change" and "Freedom and Change Charter" in which they called for president Omar al-Bashir to be removed from power. The alliance of groups supporting the charter came to be known by several similar names, including the "Forces of Freedom and Change" alliance (FFC or AFC). The 1 January 2019 declaration was signed by 22 organisations in total.

In August 2019, Rosalind Marsden claimed that although Sudanese women and youth had played a major role in the Sudanese Revolution, they had been "largely excluded from FFC decision-making bodies".

=== November 2019 formalisation ===
On 4 November 2019, the FFC announced a new, formal top structure, consisting of a Central Council, a Coordination Council, and an Advisory Council. The Central Council is the "supreme political" body; the Coordination Council has executive powers; and the Advisory Council "will control and give counsel" to the Central Council. The Central Council and Advisory Council include representatives from the biggest signatories to the Declaration of Freedom and Change Charter, while the Advisory Council includes representatives from all the signatories.

Central Council

| Group | Names | Since | Ref. |
|---|---|---|---|
| Sudanese Professionals Association (SPA) | Ahmed Rabie; Haifa Faroug; Husam al-Amin; Ammar Yousif; Faisal Basher | 4 Nov 2019 | |
| National Consensus Forces (NCF) | Ali al-Raieh Sinhurri; Abdul Rahim Abdalla; Siddig Yousif; Jamal Idriss; Kamal Bolad | 4 Nov 2019 | |
| Sudan Call | Salah Manna; Mariam al-Sadig; Ibrahim al-Sheikh; Ahmed Shaker; Yousif Mohammad Zain; al-Sadig al-Zaeim | 4 Nov 2019 | |
| Unionist Gathering | (3 people) | | |
| Alliance of Civil Forces | (3 people) | | |
| Centre Stream for Change | (1 person) | | |
| Republican Party (Sudan) | (1 person) | | |
| Sudanese Revolutionary Front (SRF) | (undecided as of 4 November 2019) | | |

Coordination Council

| Group | Names | Since | Ref. |
|---|---|---|---|
| SPA | (3 people) | | |
| NCF | (3 people) | | |
| Sudan Call | (3 people) | | |
| Unionist Gathering | (2 people) | | |
| Alliance of Civil Forces | (2 people) | | |
| Centre Stream for Change | (1 person) | | |
| Republican Party (Sudan) | (1 person) | | |
| SRF | (undecided as of 4 November 2019) | | |

== Role in 2019 political changes ==
Throughout the first half of 2019, the FFC supported continuing mass peaceful civil disobedience actions, especially mass street protests for several months. In April 2019, military forces rebelled against al-Bashir and arrested him in the 2019 Sudanese coup d'état.

The FFC continued coordinating protest actions, prior to the 3 June Khartoum massacre by the Rapid Support Forces, and after the massacre. In July and August 2019, the FFC negotiated a detailed power-sharing plan with the Transitional Military Council (TMC) for a Sudanese transition to democracy. On 20 August 2019, the TMC transferred power to the Sovereignty Council of five civilians nominated by the FFC, five military chosen by the TMC, and a civilian, Raja Nicola, chosen by mutual agreement between the FFC and the TMC.

== Split: Central Council versus Democratic Block ==
As of April 2023, the FFC had split into the FFC-CC (Central Council) versus the FFC-DB (Democratic Block). In early April 2023, negotiations between FFC-CC and FFC-DB for cooperation were underway.
