= 2026 Blue Nile campaign =

Ongoing military campaign in Sudan

- Part of the Sudanese civil war (2023–present)
- Current situation of control in Blue Nile
Date	25 January 2026–present
Location	Blue Nile State, Sudan
Status	Ongoing: Spillovers within Ethiopia
Territorial changes	By the end of summer 2026, RSF and SPLM-N (al-Hilu) control southern parts of the state while SAF control the northern half.

Belligerents
Republic of Sudan; Sudanese Government (Note: Transitional Sovereignty Council); SAF; Sudan Shield Forces (from April 2026); Tigray People's Liberation Front (alleged)	(Sudan) Government of Peace and Unity; RSF; New Sudan; SPLM–N (al-Hilu); Alleged Support: Ethiopia (denied)

Commanders and leaders
Mohamed Mansour; Ismail el-Tayeb (until November 2026); Ubadi al-Taher; Abdel Moniem Abdel Basit (from November 2026); Abu Aqla Kaikal (from April 2026)	Joseph Touka; Awad Bella al-Fil

Units involved
4th Infantry Division; 16th Infantry Brigade; 13th Infantry Brigade; Tigray Defense Forces	Unknown

Casualties and losses
Unknown	36 vehicles destroyed 2 vehicles captured (Ethiopia) 1 drone destroyed
- 103,000 displaced

The 2026 Blue Nile campaign is an ongoing military campaign by the Rapid Support Forces, SPLM-N (al-Hilu) and SPLM-N (Toka) to capture Blue Nile state in the southeastern corner of Sudan.

== Background ==
On 15 April 2023, conflict broke out between the Rapid Support Forces (RSF), and the Sudanese Armed Forces (SAF). Sight of conflict has been in central and west Sudan, and previously the Butana. Blue Nile State has been safe throughout the war besides spillover incursions from RSF's offensive in Sennar State. RSF captured Al-Tadamun for a certain period of time before being defeated by the SAF.

== Campaign ==
On 25 January 2026, the Sudanese government reported that the RSF and the al-Hilu movement attacked Blue Nile state from South Sudan, including the areas of Al-Sillik and Milkan, battling with the SAF's 4th Infantry Division.

By 3 February, RSF and al-Hilu forces captured Deim Mansour, Bashir Nuqu, and Khor al-Budi. A government official claimed that the opposition forces launched the attacks from Ethiopia where Ethiopia had built training camps for the RSF. He also claimed later in the statement, RSF and al-Hilu have been residing in Benishangul-Gumuz region, and claimed also in that region, bases overseen by the UAE have targeted the SAF with drones. On 5 February, Abdel-Ati al-Faki, a local official stated a significant buildup by al-Hilu. In addition, 1,500 people were displaced from previous attacks and arrived in Kurmuk. On 27 February, the RSF and al-Hilu forces launched coordinated drone strikes on Geissan along with Kurmuk, destroying a girl's primary school, and reportedly another unnamed school in the village Khor Al-Dhab.

By 24 March, RSF and al-Hilu captured Kurmuk, the third biggest town in the state, along with the Al-Kaili and Al-Baraka area. The commander of the 16th Infantry Brigade, Mohamed Mansour, confirmed the withdrawal. A regional government spokesperson of Blue Nile claimed fighters had moved from Darfur, into an unnamed country, for training and arming before the assault. On 26 March, the RSF and al-Hilu continued its offensive across southern parts of the state. The opposition mobilized up to the Geissan District. On 27 March, the SAF reinforced positions on the outskirts of Ed Damazin, the state capital. Major General Ismail al-Tayeb, the commander of the 4th Infantry Division inspected garrisons in the areas of Sale and Danduro, and claimed that the military had entered a decisive phase. Governor of Blue Nile Ahmed al-Omda ordered local citizens to organize a resistance. The next day, civilians were reported to have fled the town Geissan fearing an attack as the RSF and SPLM-N al-Hilu have been mobilizing in the past month.

By 20 April, the SAF launched an operation north of Kurmuk locality, recapturing Magaja in the Bau locality. In addition, the Sudan Shield Forces, led by Abu Aqla Kaikal, arrived in the region, with Kaikal vowing to end RSF presence in the state.

On 25 April, the army's 4th Infantry Division from Ed-Damazin said its forces and allied groups repelled an RSF invasion on the Sale site. The Sudanese military claimed to have captured 2 RSF vehicles, destroyed 36 vehicles, and neutralized several fighters. On the other hand, an RSF spokesperson said RSF has full control of Al-Kaili.

By 8 May, SPLM-N captured Keren Keren and Dukan which are located south of the county Kurmuk. Awad Bella al-Fil, the Kurmuk governor, said that the SPLM-N did not witness any major resistance by the Sudanese army and noted that the SPLM-N are advancing toward Khor Hassan. Locals reported that the opposition coalition looted agricultural stocks and destroying water sources and health centers. The next day, the Sudanese army's 4th Infantry Division recaptured Al-Kaili after intense battles with the RSF and SPLM-N. The SAF then stated the remaining fighters fled the area, leading to civilians celebrating throughout the streets of the state capital Ed Domain.

On 16 May, SAF recaptured Khor Hassan. On May 18th, the SAF's 4th Infantry Division announced the recapture of Keren Keren and Dukan.

On 23 May, the SAF intercepted a Bayraktar Akinci drone from Ethiopia approximately 75 km from the border around the state capital. The day after, the SAF recaptured Al-Barka, closing in on Kurmuk, inflicting heavy casualties the 4th Infantry Division claimed.

On 26 May, the SAF announced the 13th Infantry Brigade's recapture of the areas Adi, Washimbu, Um Shanqar, Abdaqala, and Kinshinkaru, in Geissan locality, pursuing the RSF to the Ethiopian border.

By 28 May, SAF starts closing in on the opposition controlled town Kurmuk, which was captured earlier in the year. The 4th Infantry Division announced that the army destroyed the final rebel strongholds in Blue Nile. SAF also claimed to have repelled an RSF attack on Al-Barka locality. The next day the SAF repelled a joint attack by the RSF and SPLM-N on Amora station, which destroyed the plan to cut off Qaisan.

On 3 June, the SAF repelled a major attack carried out by RSF and SPLM-N on Al-Barka, pushing towards Kurmuk. SAF Colonel Ubadi al-Tahir said that the forces were at full readiness to meet the attack and that the military plan was executed with high precision."

On 5 June, RSF carried out drone strikes on the state capital Ad-Damazin, as well as in other areas across the country.

On 23 June, the SAF launched a significant operation in the Geissan district recapturing a key stronghold. The army's 4th Infantry Division targeted areas past Abu Dugla and Ashambo, located only 1 kilometre from the border with Ethiopia. The army retook control of the Al-Bar area.

On 30 June 2026, Radio Dabanga reported that the Sudanese Armed Forces (SAF) and allied Joint Force militias claimed territorial gains against the Rapid Support Forces (RSF) in both Blue Nile State and Darfur. In parallel, the Joint Force announced the capture of Kolbus locality in West Darfur following clashes with RSF units. The area was described as strategically significant due to its position near the Sudan–Chad border.

By 3 July, SAF reached Kurmuk, starting battles throughout the city. The SAF achieved full victory by 8 July, recapturing the third biggest settlement in Blue Nile State being occupied by the RSF since March 2026.

On 14 July, the SAF reported the recapture of the Fashfoun area after decisive battles.

On 31 July, the Tigray People's Liberation Front invaded Ethiopia from Sudan.

On 22 August, RSF reoccupied Kurmuk.

On 28 August, the RSF reported they have seized the Bakori and Surkum army bases.

On 8 November, the SAF replaced the 4th Infantry Division commander El Tayeb Ismail, with Abdel Moniem Abdel Basit.

On 19 November, RSF captured Bau locality with no resistance after a large SAF force withdrew towards Ad Damazin. Both sides also claimed control of the Derang area with the SAF's 4th Infantry Division claiming to have ambushed RSF fighters in the area, destroying 28 combat vehicles, and seizing 18 others. The RSF said it captured Derang and Al-Madina 12 and made SAF retreat to the outskirts of Ad Damazin. Neither can be confirmed.
