= 2026 Kauda clashes =

Ongoing battle in the 2023–present Sudan conflict

- Part of Sudanese civil war (2023–present)
- Map of locations mentioned in the article (Red: SPLM-N (al-Hilu) bases, Blue: Contested locations, Green: Otoro villages)
Date	March 2026–present
Location	Kauda, Southern Kordofan, Sudan

Belligerents
Government of Peace and Unity; RSF; Pro-RSF Otoro faction; New Sudan; SPLM–N (al-Hilu)	Otoro Nuba people; Unnamed Otoro rebel group which controls territory; Other Otoro Armed Groups

Commanders and leaders
Abdelaziz al-Hilu; Izzat Koko Angalo; Joseph Toka	Koko Al-Diqair Damjala

Casualties and losses
8+ killed (RSF)	200 fighters captured, 100+ fighters killed
- 453 people killed, 53,000 displaced and 710 arrested

In March 2026, an armed conflict erupted between the Sudan People's Liberation Movement–North (al-Hilu) and the Otoro Nuba people in southern Sudan, near the town of Kauda.

== Prelude ==
In August 2022, during the administration conference convened by the SPLM-N in Heiban, all tribes except the Otoro agreed on demarcation of tribal areas to avoid future clashes. The Otoro tribe has also opposed the SPLM-N's alliance with the Rapid Support Forces and the RSF's alleged use of Otoro areas for mining and recruitment during the ongoing civil war.

== Clashes ==
In early May 2026, members of the Otoro tribe refused the entry of a mining company linked to the Rapid Support Forces into their area. In response, Abdelaziz al-Hilu ordered them to surrender their weapons. The tribesmen refused, leading to the SPLM-N (al-Hilu) launching an attack on 5 May in the south and east of Kauda, Karbo, west of Mandi, the axis of the Tarur area, the Qardud area northwest of Dubai, and the Maqri area northeast of Kauda. During the attack, militiamen committed looting, burnings and killings. The village of Karbo was completely destroyed, while large parts of Sharoubir were burned, prompting residents to flee towards the mountains or the city of Al-Luwayri.

By 13 May, 61 people were reported killed following clashes between the SPLM-N (al-Hilu) and members of the Otoro tribe in Kauda, South Kordofan. Civilians including women and children were deliberately targeted.

On 5 June, Otoro fighters reportedly executed a government official. On 8 June, they allegedly shelled the Kauda Fawq market, killing six people and burning the market to the ground. On 19 June, SPLM-N (al-Hilu) fighters under Chief of Staff Angalo reportedly killed three people in Kauda, including a Catholic priest. A day later, the Otoro faction captured much of Kauda from the SPLM-N (al-Hilu), setting fire to government sites, churches, and humanitarian offices. The Otoro fighters denied the alleged burning of churches, humanitarian offices and government sites, pointing that the destruction happened from the beginning of the conflict.

On 15 July, SPLM-N (al-Hilu) forces launched an attack on the village of Al-Hamam, leading to deaths, injuries and displacement. Three days later, on 18 July, the forces attacked the village of Al-Qardoud using heavy artillery, forcing hundreds to flee. Both villages were torched by the attackers. Hundreds of civilians fled to Kubam, Kambra, Lujulu, Al-Hadra, Hajar Al-Hatab, and Umm Dulu.

On 2 August, heavy clashes erupted in the Kudi, Al-Irsaliyya, and Kajo neighborhoods of Kauda with heavy weaponry. Otoro rebels stormed the Kauda central prison, freeing more than 100 prisoners, and burned down local government headquarters in Heiban. On 8 August, SPLM-N (al-Hilu) forces used three vehicles to attack the villages of Al-Qoz, Nawali, and Korbela in Kauda, and abducted four humanitarian workers from Samaritan's Purse. They also shelled the Luwere area with heavy artillery. From 21 to 22 August, despite a ceasefire brokered by RSF chief Hemedti, SPLM-N (al-Hilu) forces shelled Kauda from their base in Al-Gadeel using 120mm mortars and 23mm anti-aircraft guns. They also shelled the villages of Shiri, Kadri, Korbla, Al-Qumair, Shawri, Duli, Karqa and Namli. On 25 August, the SPLM-N (al-Hilu) killed 47 people, including 20 tribal fighters and 27 civilians four children, in the Otoro villages of Qardud and Abu Hamama in South Kordofan. On 26 August, the SPLM-N (al-Hilu) recaptured Kauda, posting videos showing its fighters entering local civil administration offices. However, the following day, the Otoro fighters refuted SPLM-N claim of capturing Kauda by posting their own videos on social media as proof of their control. 200 Otoro fighters were captured and transferred to Al-Hilu headquarters in Tungoli. According to Otoro chief, while inside Kauda, al-Hilu forces detonated a fuel station, wounding 28 civilians. The next day, five vehicles of the al-Hilu faction entered into Kauda, looted a local commercial store, and advanced towards the Samaritan’s Purse aid compound before being repelled by armed guards.

On 1 September, a group of al-Hilu fighters consisting of three vehicles led by Captain Mustafa Hajir entered Kauda attempting to loot a number of shops before withdrawing after clashing with Otoro youth. On 3 September, a military force consisting of combat vehicles, motorcycles and infantry, led by Captain Idris Qutya, attacked farms in the Jabal “Oqo” area, looted crops before withdrawing from the area. By that point, 53,000 people living in the camps of Kujur Al-Shaabiya, Kujama Al-Kubra, Dalir, Lagolo, and Kumbra Al-Kubra had been displaced. On the same day, SPLM-N (al-Hilu) forces attacked Debi and Lwere, killing 21 people, including women and children. On 5 September, Rapid Support Forces entered the fight by attacking Jakama village. During the fighting, at least eight RSF fighters including the field commander were reportedly killed. On 7 September, around 40 vehicles of RSF forces were reported in Damik while 80 SPLM members were killed in Kiga Tamiro. The same day, several people were killed on both sides during clashes between SPLM-N and Otoro forces near Kauda airport. On 8 September, the SPLM-N attacked the villages of Ramtala, Al-Muqrayh, and Kalqa, prompting civilians to flee. On 23 September the SPLM-N (al-Hilu) was accused of executing eight Otoro prisoners at the Mandi detention facility in Heiban District. Two others were kidnapped at the Um Dulu village. In an interview with Sudan Tribune, the Otoro traditional chief(Mak) said that the conflict between SPLA-N and Otoro has claimed more than 500 Otoro lives while leaving over 25000 Otoro civilians displaced in caves and mountains. He provided a chronological narrative of the events, accusing the SPLA-N of trying to erase his community from their ancestral lands. He pointed out that the Otoro control Kauda and all Otoro lands. He refuted the SPLA-N’s allegation of Otoro rebellion pointing out the community still pursues the New Sudan project, pointing to the 4 decades of Otoro sacrifices to the cause of the project.
