= Yabus =

Yabus يابوس
- Town
- Location in Sudan
- Coordinates: 9°56′50″N 34°10′37″E
- Country: Sudan; De facto: New Sudan
- State: Blue Nile
- Control: SPLM-North (al-Hilu)
- Time zone: UTC+2 (CAT)

Yabus (Arabic: يابوس) is a town in Blue Nile State in south-eastern Sudan near the borders with Ethiopia and South Sudan. It lies on the Yabus River.

Yabus is linked by road to Kurmuk some 80 km to the north, but the road is only passable in the dry season. As of 2024, this road is impassable.

There is an airstrip at Yabus. As of 2024, this is not an airport but an airstrip and it has not been used for years.

A number of humanitarian agencies have been active in Yabus, including GOAL (of Ireland), ROOF (Relief Organization of Fazugli, Nairobi), CEAS (Church Ecumenical Action in Sudan) and SIM (Serving In Mission). As of 2024, all of these NGOs have left Yabus.

The area is disputed between Sudan and South Sudan. In May 2011 it was reported that the Sudan People's Liberation Army was occupying Yabus, and the army of Sudan was threatening to occupy it. As a result, humanitarian agencies had to withdraw from the area.
