= New Sudan (territory) =

Territory under the control of the Sudan People's Liberation Movement–North

- 2011–present (Note: Until 2024, the term New Sudan was not used for the territories under the control of the SPLM-N (Al-Hilu).)
- Flag

- Military situation as of 7 September 2026 Controlled by Sudanese Armed Forces and allies (Transitional Sovereignty Council) Controlled by RSF (Government of Peace and Unity) Controlled by SPLM–N (al-Hilu) (New Sudan) Controlled by allied RSF and SPLM–N (al-Hilu) (Government of Peace and Unity and New Sudan) Controlled by an unnamed Otoro rebel group Controlled by SLM (al-Nur) (Liberated Areas) (Detailed map) (Engagements)
- Capital: Kauda, Sudan
- Government: Military law (since 2018)
- Leader
  - 2011–2017: Malik Agar
  - 2017: Disputed between: Malik Agar and Abdelaziz al-Hilu
  - 2017–present: Abdelaziz al-Hilu
- Chief of Staff
  - 2023–present: Izzat Koko Angelo
- Establishment: Sudanese conflict in South Kordofan and Blue Nile
- History
  - Establishment: 2011
  - Rebellion of the Otoro Nuba people: June 2026–August 2026

Population
  - 2024 estimate: 3,900,000; 700,000 refugees (in the Nuba mountains)

New Sudan (Arabic: السودان الجديد, romanized: al-Sūdān al-Jadīd), also known as the Liberated Areas (Arabic: المناطق المحررة, romanized: al-Manāṭiq al-Muḥarrira) refers to the territory in Sudan under the effective control of the Sudan People's Liberation Movement–North (Al-Hilu). In late 2025, the SPLM-N (Al-Hilu) joined the Government of Peace and Unity; however, New Sudan still exists.

== Territorial control ==
The territory has been controlled by the SPLM-N and later SPLM-N (al-Hilu) since 2011.

In July 2023, the SPLM-N (al-Hilu) seized several army garrisons and an oil field in South Kordofan and blocked the road leading from Karkal to Kadugli. It also launched another attack in Kurmuk.

In June 2024, Nicholas Casey of The New York Times was allowed in the Nuba Mountains stronghold of the SPLM-N (al-Hilu) led by Abdel Aziz al-Hilu. Casey reported that the civil war had distracted the SAF from attacking the SPLM-N (al-Hilu) and allowed the SPLM-N (al-Hilu) to go on the offensive, capturing territory "at a steady pace". It calls the territory it controls "New Sudan"; 2024 was the first time it used the term for the territories it controls. Its capital is Kauda, a farming town. At least 3.9 million people live in the territory under the control of the SPLM-N (al-Hilu).

In February 2025, there were reports about a famine in the territory controlled by the SPLM-N (al-Hilu).

In December 2025, the SPLM–N (al-Hilu) claimed to have retaken the town of Qardoud Nama in South Kordofan from the SAF. The SAF retook the town of Mabsouta from the SPLM–N (al-Hilu), which had occupied the area since 2011.

On the 3 February 2026 both the RSF and SPLM-N (al-Hilu) seized the towns of Deim Mansour, Bashir Nuqu and Khor al-Budi near Kurmuk in Blue Nile state. In the same month, a faction of the SPLM-N (al-Hilu) led by Joseph Toka, was revealed to be active in areas held by both the RSF and the SPLM-N (Al-Hilu).

In June 2026, the Otoro Nuba people rebelled against the SPLM-N (Al-Hilu), and seized Kauda and expelled its local administration. In August 2026, the SPLM-N (Al-Hilu) regained full control of Kauda, including local administrative offices and public buildings after two days of fighting with the Otoro Nuba people.

=== Government ===
In 2013, the SPLM-N established a civil authority in areas under its control. As of 2017, Abdelaziz al-Hilu headed the SPLM-N (al-Hilu) faction, which opposed the Sudanese Armed Forces and, as a member of the Sudan Founding Alliance, supported the Rapid Support Forces' attempt to establish a parallel Government of Peace and Unity. Journalist Nicholas Casey described the faction as one of the few rebel groups claiming to advocate for a Western-style democracy, noting that it has a constitution and calls for a secular state in Sudan. The SPLM-N (al-Hilu) also provides public services in areas under its control, including issuing driver's licenses and birth certificates, operating a court system staffed by volunteer judges that handles cases ranging from dowry disputes to murder, and maintaining schools that teach in English. The SPLM-N (al-Hilu) also holds on the New Sudan concept.

== Similar territory with the name New Sudan ==
In 1999, the Sudan People's Liberation Movement (SPLM) also referred to its territory as New Sudan, with its territory in what is now South Sudan. In 2006, the term New Sudan still was used for the territory of the SPLM.

== See also ==
- Government of Peace and Unity
- Liberated Areas
- Republic of Sudan
