= Deim Mansour =

Town in Sudan

Deim Mansour ديم منصور
- Location in Sudan (Blue Nile State highlighted)
- Coordinates: 10°30′N 34°17′E
- Country: Sudan
- State: Blue Nile State
- Control: RSF and SPLM–N
- Time zone: Central Africa Time, GMT + 3

Deim Mansour (Arabic: ديم منصور) is a town in the Blue Nile State, Sudan. Since 2011 and during the Sudan War, it has been the site of violent clashes between the Sudan People's Liberation Movement–North (SPLM/N) - Al Hilu and the Sudanese Armed Forces (SAF). This conflict has led to a significant displacement of people, with about 5,000 reportedly fleeing to Ethiopia following the clashes in the Kurmuk locality, which includes Deim Mansour. In 2026, RSF and Al-Hilu captured the town.
