= Sudan Revolutionary Front =

Alliance of Sudanese rebel groups

- الجبهة الثورية السودانية
- Leaders: Al-Hadi Idris Yahya (current chair); Yasir Arman; Gibril Ibrahim; Minni Minnawi; Al-Tahir Abu Bakr Hajar
- Dates active: 12 November 2011 – present
- Groups: Sudan People's Liberation Movement-North (Arman); Justice and Equality Movement; Sudan Liberation Movement (Minnawi); Sudan Liberation Forces Alliance; Sudan Liberation Movement-Transitional Council
- Headquarters: Kauda
- Active regions: Sudan; Blue Nile; North Darfur; North Kordofan; South Darfur; South Kordofan; West Darfur
- Ideology: New Sudan
- Size: 60,000
- Wars: the Sudanese conflict in South Kordofan and Blue Nile and the War in Darfur

The Sudan Revolutionary Front (Arabic: الجبهة الثورية السودانية, romanized: Al-Jabhah Al-Thawrīyah Al-Sūdānīyah), or the Sudanese Revolutionary Front (SRF), is an alliance between Sudanese factions that was created in opposition to the government of President Omar al-Bashir. It was declared on 12 November 2011, following several months of support by Darfuri rebel groups for the Sudan People's Liberation Movement–North in the conflict in South Kordofan and Blue Nile.

During the Sudanese civil war (2023–present), some factions joined the Sudanese Armed Forces and others sided with the Rapid Support Forces.

== Composition ==
The Sudan Revolutionary Front (SRF) was created in November 2011 aimed to bring together the two main factions of the Sudan Liberation Movement/Army, as well as the other major rebel group in Darfur, the Justice and Equality Movement (JEM), with rebels in South Kordofan and Blue Nile states. The declaration of the SRF's formation was delayed until a disagreement between JEM and the other factions on the role of Islam in a post-revolutionary federal government was resolved.

The signers for each group were Yasir Arman for the Sudan People's Liberation Movement–North (SPLM-N), Ahmed Tugud for the JEM, Abul Gassim Al-Haj for SLM (al-Nur), and Al-Rayah Mahmoud for SLM-Minnawi.

== Areas of operation ==
Yasir Arman, the secretary-general of SPLM-N and a prominent member of the SRF's high political committee, said shortly after the SRF's formation that "all Sudan was a theatre for operations, including Khartoum". As of 2011, JEM and both SLM factions were still based in the region of Darfur, and SPLM-N had not expanded its fight against the Sudanese government north of Blue Nile and South Kordofan. In late December 2011, JEM fighters advanced into North Kordofan with the stated intention of ousting President Omar al-Bashir from power, though they suffered a setback when their leader, Khalil Ibrahim, was killed in action in the state.

Around the time of the SRF's formation in November 2011, the Sudanese government accused neighbouring South Sudan of supporting the rebel groups. In addition to bombing South Sudanese infrastructure and camps, South Sudanese authorities stated that Sudan had backed armed opposition factions within South Sudan.

== Sudanese peace process ==
The August 2019 Draft Constitutional Declaration, signed by military and civilian representatives during the 2018–19 Sudanese Revolution, requires that a peace agreement for resolving the War in Darfur and the Sudanese conflict in South Kordofan and Blue Nile be made within the first six months of the 39-month transition period to democratic civilian government. As part of the resulting Sudanese peace process, on 21 October 2019, el-Hadi Idris, on behalf of the SRF, and Hemedti, on behalf of the Sovereignty Council (the collective head of state), signed a political agreement (co-signed by a South Sudanese mediator) including a renewed ceasefire, the delivering of humanitarian assistance by government agencies to areas under conflict, and commitment to negotiate further.

On 31 August 2020, a peace agreement was signed between the Sudanese authorities and rebel factions led by Gibril Ibrahim, Minni Minnawi, el-Hadi Idris and Malik Agar to end armed hostilities. Under the terms of the agreement, the factions that signed will be entitled to three seats on the sovereignty council, a total of five ministers in the transitional cabinet and a quarter of seats in the transitional legislature. At a regional level, signatories will be entitled between 30 and 40% of the seats on transitional legislatures of their home states or regions.

== Sudanese civil war ==
In 2025, the group expelled the United Popular Front (UPF) as a member after the latter accused the alliance of being unduly influenced by the Rapid Support Forces. The UPF itself had sided with the Sudanese Armed Forces at the beginning of the war in 2023.

== See also ==
- Sudanese Awakening Revolutionary Council
