= Malik Agar =

Sudanese politician and insurgent leader (born 1952)

His Excellency Commander General Malik Agar
- مالك عقار
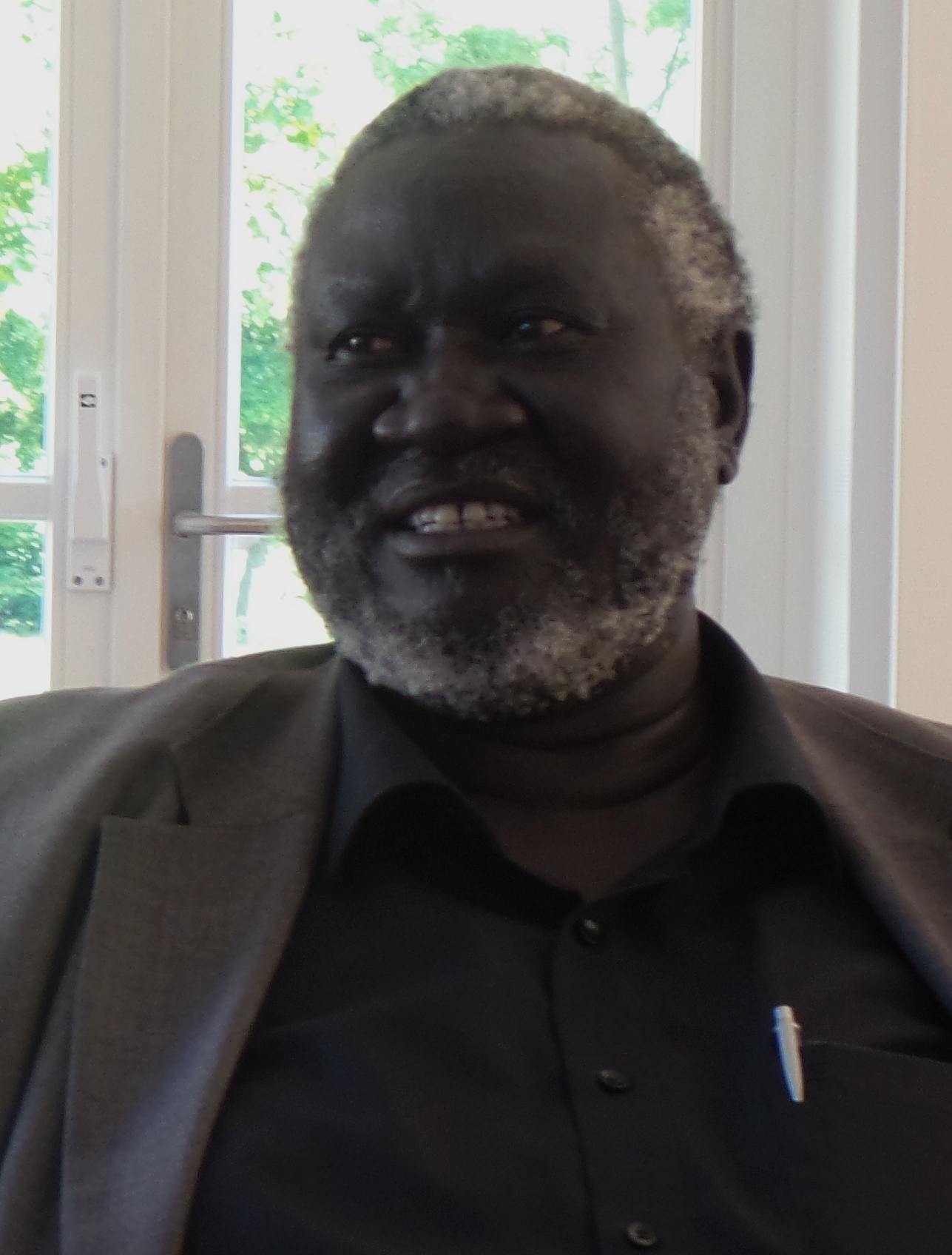
- Agar in 2015

Vice-President of the Transitional Sovereignty Council
- Incumbent
- Assumed office 19 May 2023
- Prime Minister: Abdalla Hamdok; Osman Hussein (acting); Dafallah al-Haj Ali (acting); Kamil Idris
- Chairman: Abdel Fattah al-Burhan
- Preceded by: Hemedti

Member of the Transitional Sovereignty Council
- Incumbent
- Assumed office 11 November 2021
- In office 2 February 2021 – 25 October 2021

Chairman of the SRF
- Incumbent
- Assumed office February 2012

Chairman of SPLM-N
- Incumbent
- Assumed office February 2011

Governor of Blue Nile State
- In office April 2010 – 2 September 2011

Personal details
- Born: Nganyofa Agar Eyre Nganyofa; 1952 (age 73–74) Baw District, Blue Nile State, Republic of Sudan
- Party: SPLM-N
- Occupation: Politician, soldier

Military service
- Allegiance: Sudan People's Liberation Movement
- Years of service: 1983–present
- Battles/wars: Second Sudanese Civil War; Sudanese conflict in South Kordofan and Blue Nile; Sudanese civil war (2023–present)

Malik Agar (Arabic: مالك عقار, romanized: Mālik ʻAqqār; born Nganyofa Agar Eyre Nganyofa) is a Sudanese politician and former insurgent leader who was active in the insurgency in Blue Nile state. Since 2023, he has been the deputy chairman of the Transitional Sovereignty Council, Sudan's ruling military junta.

== Early life ==
Malik Agar was born Nganyofa Agar Eyre Nganyofa to an Ingessana chief in Baw District, Blue Nile State in 1952. He did not know he was a Muslim until he was eight. His school teacher gave him the name "Malik" and told him he was a Muslim. From then on, he was called "Malik Agar Eyre".

== Second Sudanese Civil War ==
Agar joined the Sudanese armed opposition shortly after the beginning of the Second Sudanese Civil War in 1983.

In the 1990s, he was the commander of a section of the Sudan People's Liberation Movement (SPLM) military forces along the Ethiopia–Sudan border south of the Blue Nile to Geissan. SPLM units under his command captured the towns of Kurmuk and Qaissan in 1997.

Agar was close to John Garang, and shared his goal of overthrowing the Government of Sudan, as opposed to fighting for the secession of South Sudan. After Garang's death, Agar, along with others who shared a desire for a revolution in Sudan, were marginalised by the new SPLM leadership. Agar expressed his disapproval of the secession of South Sudan to a US official in 2009, stating that it would cause the eventual splintering of the rest of Sudan.

== Post-civil war ==
He was elected governor of Blue Nile State in the Republic of the Sudan in April 2010. Agar was one of the few high-profile members of the Sudanese opposition to run in the election, and was the only non-National Congress Party (NCP) candidate to win a governorship. Agar defeated the NCP candidate, Farah Ibrahim Mohamed Al-Aggar, by 8,702 votes.

In February 2011, Malik Agar also became chairman of the Sudan People's Liberation Movement–North, the part of the SPLM that operates in northern Sudan. The southern portion of the SPLM became a separate political party in South Sudan when the country seceded from the Republic of Sudan in July 2011.

On 2 September, Agar was deposed as governor on the orders of President Omar al-Bashir. He fled to the southern part of the state and was reportedly planning a counterattack. He warned that the Sudan–SPLM conflict may ignite a wider Sudanese civil war.

In February 2012, Agar helped found the Sudanese Revolutionary Front (SRF); a coalition of Sudanese opposition groups that aims to overthrow the Sudanese government and replace it with a democracy. In February 2012, Agar was elected president of the SRF.

In mid-2017, Agar split from the mainstream faction of the SPLM–N led by Abdelaziz al-Hilu. A key factor motivating the split was that al-Hilu's group insisted on including the establishment of a secular state in negotiations with the al-Bashir government of the time, while Agar's group disagreed. In the 2019–2020 Sudanese Revolution phase of the Sudanese peace process, al-Hilu's group continued to insist on secularisation of the state as a requirement for a peace deal.

In February 2021, Agar was appointed as a member of the Sovereignty Council of Sudan. In the ongoing civil war, Agar has supported the Sudanese Armed Forces (SAF) in opposition to the Rapid Support Forces (RSF) and the SPLM–N of al-Hilu.

In June 2026, a planned visit by Agar to Berlin was reportedly cancelled after Germany declined to grant visas to members of his accompanying delegation. The visit had intended to discuss the situation in Sudan and the political process amid the ongoing civil war.

== Ideology ==
Agar rejects former president Omar al-Bashir's Arab-Islamic nationalism, and has argued instead for a secular and multicultural civil democracy.
