= New Sudan =

New Sudan may refer to:

- New Sudan, a quasi-state in Sudan
- New Sudan, a political philosophy that proposes reconstructing Sudan
- New Sudan Vision, online South Sudanese newspaper
