= Khor al-Budi =

Town in Sudan

- Town
- Country: Sudan
- State: Blue Nile State
- Time zone: UTC+2 (CAT)

Khor al-Budi is a town in Blue Nile State, Sudan.

== History ==
Khor al-Budi has been affected by the Blue Nile campaign of the Sudanese civil war. In February 2026, the Sudan People's Liberation Movement–North (SPLMN) claimed to have taken control of the town. It is currently part of the New Sudan territory controlled by the SPLMN.
