= Sudanese conflict in South Kordofan and Blue Nile =

2011–2020 insurgency in southern Sudan

- Part of the Sudanese Civil Wars, Arab Spring, and Arab Winter
- Justice and Equality Movement fighters, 2011
Date	5 June 2011 – 31 August 2020 (8 years, 8 months, 2 weeks and 3 days)
Location	South Kordofan and Blue Nile in Sudan; Spillover into South Sudan
Result	Stalemate

Belligerents
Sudan	SRF (until 2020); JEM; SPLM–N; SLA; Alleged support: Ethiopia

Commanders and leaders
(Sudan) Abdel Fattah al-Burhan; (Sudan) Omar al-Bashir (until 11 April 2019); (Sudan) Abdel Rahim Mohd. Hussein (until 11 April 2019); (Sudan) Mustafa Osman Obeid Salim (until 2015); (Sudan) Ibrahim Balandiya †	Abdelaziz al-Hilu; Gibril Ibrahim; Khalil Ibrahim † Malik Agar; Yasir Arman; Minni Minnawi; Abdul Wahid al-Nur; Mohamed Rahouma †

Units involved
Sudanese Armed Forces; Popular Defence Forces (until 11 April 2019); Hawazma ethnic militia; Rapid Support Forces	SLA; Minni Minawi faction; Second Revolution faction; SPLM–N; South Kordofan faction; Blue Nile faction

Strength
109,300 (Note: Does not represent the number of soldiers stationed in South Kordofan and Blue Nile. Number also includes 85,000 reserve personnel.); 17,500	30,000—40,000; 35,000

Casualties and losses
600−650 killed; 179 confirmed captured; 405 vehicles destroyed; 746 vehicles captured; 2,530 (2013−2014 in Blue Nile)	704 killed
- Total: c. 643−1,500 killed 500,000 displaced

The Sudanese conflict in South Kordofan and Blue Nile was an armed conflict and insurgency in the Sudanese states of South Kordofan and Blue Nile (known as the Two Areas) between the Sudanese Armed Forces (SAF) and the Sudan People's Liberation Movement–North (SPLM-N), a northern offshoot of the Sudan People's Liberation Movement (SPLM) in now neighbouring South Sudan. After some years of relative calm following the 2005 agreement which ended the Second Sudanese Civil War between the Sudanese government and SPLM rebels, fighting broke out again in the lead-up to South Sudan's independence on 9 July 2011, starting in South Kordofan on 5 June and spreading to the neighboring Blue Nile state in September. SPLM-N, splitting from newly independent SPLM, took up arms against the retained inclusion of the two southern states in Sudan with no popular consultation and against the lack of democratic elections. The conflict is intertwined with the War in Darfur, since in November 2011 SPLM-N established a loose alliance with Darfuri rebels, called Sudan Revolutionary Front (SRF).

As of October 2014, some two million people have been affected by the conflict, with more than 500,000 having been displaced and about 250,000 of them fleeing to South Sudan and Ethiopia. In January 2015, fighting intensified as Omar al-Bashir's government tried to regain control of rebel-held territory ahead of April 2015 general elections.

With the overthrow of al-Bashir in April 2019 following months of protests, the SRF announced a three-month ceasefire, hoping to facilitate a Sudanese transition to democracy. This led to the beginning of peace negotiations between the rebels and the new interim government. The Sudanese peace process was formalised with the August 2019 Draft Constitutional Declaration, signed by military and civilian representatives during the Sudanese Revolution, that mandates that a peace agreement be made in South Kordofan and Blue Nile (and in Darfur) within the first six months of the 39-month transition period to democratic civilian government.

On 31 August 2020, a comprehensive peace agreement was signed in Juba, South Sudan, between the Sudan's transitional government and the Sudan Revolutionary Front. The Sudan People's Liberation Movement-North led by Abdelaziz al-Hilu and Sudan Liberation Movement/Army led by Abdul Wahid al-Nur refused to sign the agreement.

An agreement was reached between the transitional government and the SPLM-North al-Hilu rebel faction on 3 September 2020 in Addis Ababa to separate religion and state and not discriminate against anyone's ethnicity in order to secure the equal treatment of all citizens of Sudan. The declaration of principles stated that “Sudan is a multi-racial, multi-ethnic, multi-religious and multi-cultural society. Full recognition and accommodation of these diversities must be affirmed. (...) The state shall not establish an official religion. No citizen shall be discriminated against based on their religion.”

== Background ==
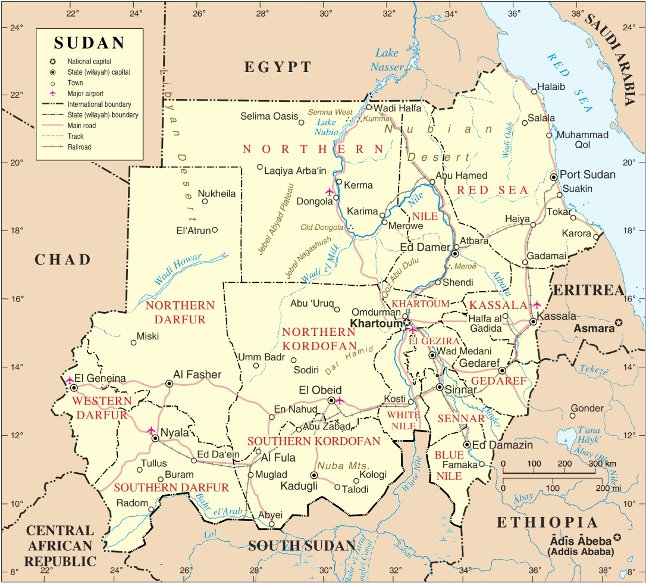
Map of Sudan (after 2011)

Although South Kordofan and Blue Nile are north of the Sudan–South Sudan border, many of their residents (particularly in the Nuba Mountains) identify with South Sudan with many of them having fought alongside the southern rebels during the Second Sudanese Civil War.

South Kordofan and Blue Nile were not allowed to participate in the January 2011 referendum to create South Sudan, and the "popular consultation" process they were promised also failed to take place.

According to satellite imagery, during early spring 2011, Sudan elevated dirt roads needed for tank transportation and in March 2011 it started deploying police and military installations in the area.

=== May 2011 Abyei conflict ===
In May 2011, ahead of South Sudan's scheduled independence, tensions rose around the status of the Abyei Area, an oil-rich region that was statutorily part of both South Kordofan and Northern Bahr el Ghazal states. As South Kordofan was slated to remain with Sudan while Northern Bahr el Ghazal was seceding together with the rest of what was then Southern Sudan Autonomous Region, the status of Abyei was unclear, and both Khartoum and Juba claimed the area as their own.

On 19 May 2011, militants reportedly affiliated with the Sudan People's Liberation Army attacked a convoy of mixed Sudanese Army and UNMIS vehicles 10 km north of Abyei town as they withdrew from the area's administrative centre, drawing condemnation from both the Sudanese government and the United Nations.

At least 15 Sudanese tanks entered Abyei town on 20 May, beginning large-scale fighting in Abyei. By 22 May, the Sudanese military had seized control of the town, and most of Abyei's residents had fled south toward Bahr el Ghazal. Both the Sudanese government and the government of Southern Sudan accused one another of violating the terms of the Comprehensive Peace Agreement.

In June 2011, an African Union panel headed by former South African president Thabo Mbeki tried to de-escalate the situation through north–south talks in the Ethiopian capital Addis Ababa. On 20 June, the parties agreed to demilitarize the contested area of Abyei, and UN peacekeepers were deployed as part of United Nations Interim Security Force for Abyei on 27 June. The agreement details how a new Abyei administration council would replace the one dissolved by president Omar al-Bashir in May 2011. Its chief shall be picked by the SPLM but must be approved by the northern National Congress Party (NCP). The deputy however, would be nominated by the NCP and endorsed by SPLM. Three of the five heads of the departments of the administrative council would be nominated by the SPLM and the remaining two by the NCP. A police service would be established for the region, with the size and composition determined by a joint committee co-chaired by northern and southern officials. The US Secretary of State Hillary Clinton and United Nations Secretary-General Ban Ki-moon welcomed the accord but said the real test would be how both sides would implement the deal.

On 21 June, a statement was attributed to the NCP's official in charge of the Abyei file, Didiri Mohamed Ahmed, as saying that there was an understanding reached at the Addis Ababa meeting between the two parties that South Sudan would concede future ownership of Abyei to Sudan. However, the spokesman of SPLA, Philip Aguer, told the press that the statement from the NCP senior official was incorrect.

== Conflict in South Kordofan and Blue Nile ==
=== 2011 ===
==== June ====
On 5 June 2011, armed conflict broke out between the government of Sudan and the Sudan People's Liberation Movement–North (SPLM–N) in South Kordofan, ahead of the scheduled independence of southern Sudan on 9 July. The Sudanese Army said that the SPLA launched an attack on a police station and stole weapons prompting a response. The SPLA claimed that the Sudanese Army attempted to disarm their units by force. That day, the Justice and Equality Movement (JEM) rebel group claimed to have destroyed an army camp in the area of Jama, South Kordofan, killing 38 soldiers and wounding other 27.

On 14 June, the UN accused the Sudanese government of carrying out an "intensive bombing campaign" near the north–south border which has led to "huge suffering" for civilians in South Kordofan. Some 140,000 people fled the fighting. Aid agency offices were looted, churches were ransacked and buildings destroyed. Aid workers said that ethnic Nubans are being targeted by the Sudanese Army and Arab militias. This was denied by Rabbie Abdelattif Ebaid, an adviser to Sudan's information minister, who said that only rebel fighters were being targeted.

On 15 June, US President Barack Obama called for a ceasefire urging both the north and south to "live up to their responsibilities" to prevent a return to civil war. The head of the Anglican church, Archbishop of Canterbury Rowan Williams said: "The humanitarian challenge is already great, and the risk of another Darfur situation, with civilian populations at the mercy of government-supported terror, is a real one".

On 19 June, Sudanese president Omar al-Bashir accused the SPLM-N of "betrayal" in South Kordofan. "If they want war...we will show them practically like what happened in Abyei and South Kordofan" Bashir said. "It is better that they [SPLM-N] come to us in good terms and we will be better than them," he added. The Sudanese Army said that it would continue its military campaign in South Kordofan, which included aerial bombardment, until it crushes the rebellion led by former deputy governor and leading SPLM-N figure Abdelaziz al-Hilu. Fighting intensified around the state capital of Kadugli.

==== July–August ====
On 6 July a JEM field commander announced that his forces were able to defeat an army battalion in a field near Heglig, comprising fifty four members, arranged a trap for the army battalion, which was composed of nine Land Cruisers. The head of the battalion was killed, along with two other soldiers.

On 11 July, clashes were reported in Fula, South Kordofan. Sudanese Federal National Front claimed that their forces killed 20 Sudanese soldiers, and destroyed four of the seven Land Cruisers, that carried the Sudanese soldiers. Their spokesman said that they also seized fire arms and ammunition. The remainder of the government troops fled.

Fighting continued after South Sudan gained independence on 9 July, though the Sudanese government insisted that order had been restored in South Kordofan.

A UN report leaked on 18 July documented alleged war crimes in South Kordofan, claiming that both sides targeted civilians but that the Sudanese government did so more severely with them being accused of "forced disappearances, targeting of UN staff and summary executions." The following day, UN Undersecretary-General for Humanitarian Affairs Valerie Amos called for an independent investigation into atrocities possibly committed during the conflict. Amos said the Government of Sudan should lift its restrictions on access to the region.

Joint SPLM-N and JEM forces defeated government forces from 10 to 17 July in the Nuba Mountains. An army garrison in Al-Tais was captured by rebels. By the end, 150 government soldiers and 1 rebel were killed, considerable amounts of weaponry including light and heavy machine guns and artillery, RBJ, AK47 and anti air craft missiles were captured by rebels. Also 3 rebels were captured.

It was reported on 27 August that a JEM leader had been captured and sentenced to death by hanging. Around the same time, the Sudan Tribune reported that the SPLM-N, the JEM, and the Sudan Liberation Movement (SLM) had formed a tentative alliance to resist the federal government in Khartoum.

==== September–December ====
On 1 September, SPLM-N rebels in South Kordofan claimed the military was deliberately destroying crops and farms belonging to the Nuba people in an attempt to starve the state into submission. Meanwhile, state-run media claimed SPLM-N guerrillas killed 17 civilians, including children, and wounded 14 in the Kalugi region of South Kordofan on the same day.

On 7 September, clashes between Abdel Wahid's Sudan Liberation Army and the Sudanese army were reported in Jebel Marra. Rebels claimed to have killed 40 Sudanese soldiers and captured six of their vehicles. Three rebels were killed and another four were wounded.

A spokesman for the Sudanese military said that the SPLM-N militants attacked army positions in Ad-Damazin, the capital of Blue Nile state, on 1 September. Governor of Blue Nile State, Malik Agar disputed this account, saying the army attacked Blue Nile state institutions first, including his official residence. The military quickly took control of Ad-Damazin, and Khartoum replaced Agar with a military governor. Agar and his allies regrouped in southern Blue Nile. On 2 September, the federal government declared a state of emergency in the state. The Sudanese Air Force reportedly carried out strike missions, bombing SPLM-N villages and towns with the SPLM-N claiming that four civilians were killed in an aerial bombing of Kormok.

By 22 September, the SPLM-N had claimed victory in several battlefields (in the areas of Ibri, locality of Dlami; Angrto, locality of Talodi and Abolhassan, in the locality of Cdarno) killing 25 soldiers and militias belonging to the Sudanese Armed Forces (SAF) and captured several soldiers and weapons.

The JEM and the SLM, issued a joint statement on 4 September condemning the Sudanese military's use of force against the SPLM-N in Blue Nile, calling it a plot to spread "chaos and killing" across the country. They also called on the United Nations Security Council to impose a no-fly zone over Blue Nile, Darfur, and South Kordofan.

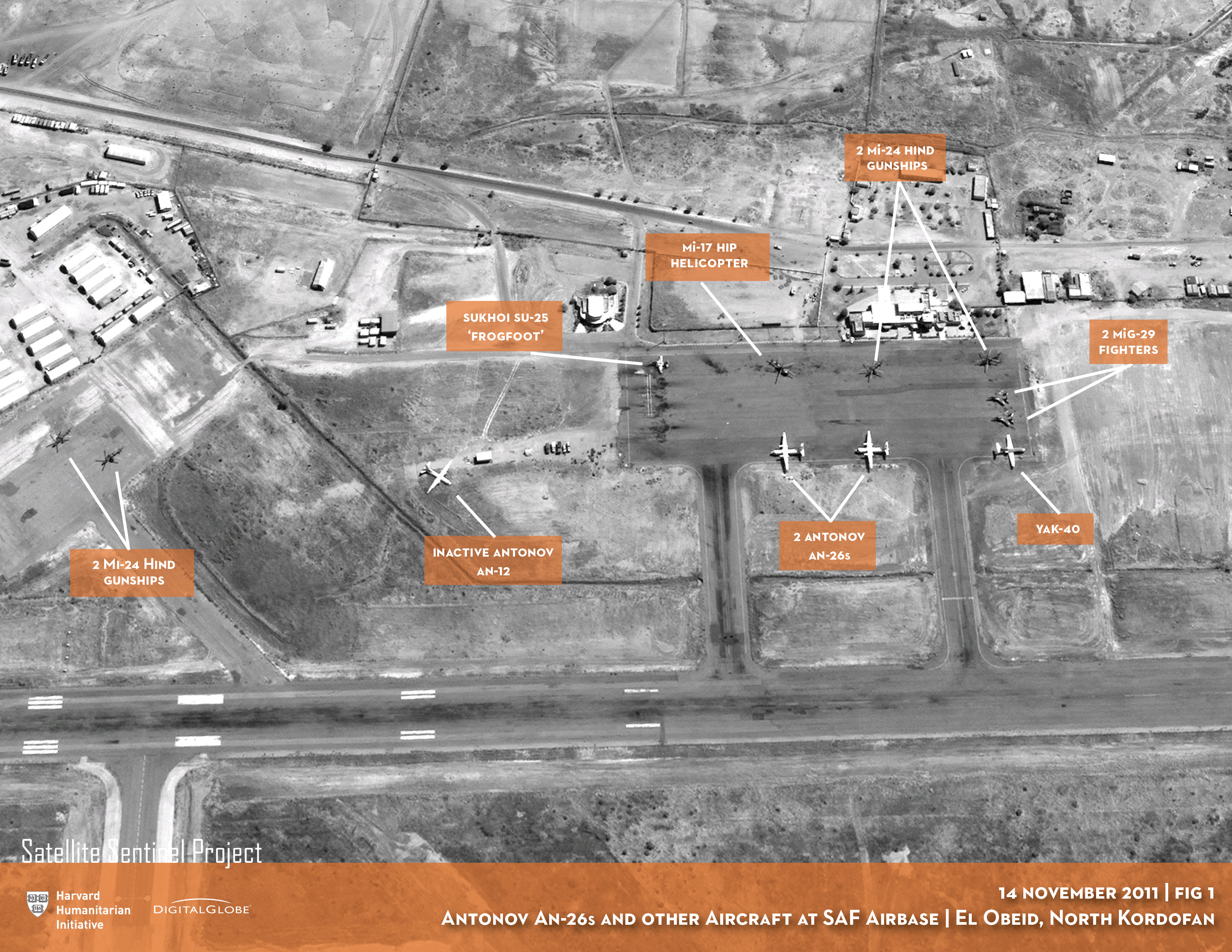
Helicopters, Antonov An-26s, MiG-29s and other aircraft at El Obeid Airbase where the SAF are believed to be attacking from.

The Sudanese military claimed on 10 September to have broken an SPLM-N siege of Qiessan, near the Ethiopian border, and evacuated its wounded soldiers from the town. Both Agar and Yahia Mohamed Kheir, the military governor appointed by al-Bashir, claimed control of 80 percent of Blue Nile state. Meanwhile, the Sudanese government said 5,000 people had fled their homes in Blue Nile as a result of the fighting, and Information Minister Sana Hamad al-Awad claimed it had proof the South Sudanese government was paying the salaries of SPLM-N fighters across the border.

On 3 October, SPLM-N forces clashed with the Sudanese army in South Kordofan killing 47 soldiers, including three well-known militia leaders and injuring 23 more.

On 9 October the SPLM-N ambushed Sudanese soldiers in Khor Adrak in Blue Nile, killing 30 of them and destroying three army vehicles and capturing one.

The Sudanese military seized control of Kurmuk, the former stronghold of the SPLM-N in Blue Nile state, on 2 November. Al-Bashir visited the town four days later to declare it "liberated". He also threatened South Sudan with war, accusing it of supporting the SPLM-N in its anti-government activities.

SPLM-N control in South Kordofan in October 2011. * Grey - SPLM-N-controlled territory * Red - Sudan Government controlled territory * White - South Sudan territory

On 10 November, it was reported that the Sudanese government bombed Yida camp in South Sudan's Unity state. Two Antonov makeshift bombers were seen leaving the area. They were said to have dropped five bombs, four detonating. The local official Miabek Lang said at least 12 people had been killed and 20 wounded during the strike. The Sudanese government has denied the claims.

Darfuri factions and the SPLM-N in Blue Nile and South Kordofan states announced the formation of an alliance called the Sudan Revolutionary Front (SRF) on 12 November. The stated goal of the coalition is to overthrow al-Bashir's government and install a democratic system in Sudan.

On 23 November, the Sudanese Liberation Army faction led by Abdul Wahid al-Nur (SLA-AW) clashed with the SAF in North Darfur's Kabkabiya region and captured 10 Land Cruisers loaded with guns in addition to capturing three soldiers, one with the rank of sergeant. 35 Sudanese soldiers were killed in the clashes.

The Sudanese Armed forces said they managed on 5 of December to defeat the rebels of the SPLA in South Kordofan's region of Lake Alubaid, where the armed forces seized the head of division nine in all its three camps. The Sudan People's Liberation Movement denied this happening and asserted that it had destroyed a whole unit of militias affiliated with the National Congress Party (NCP) and its armed forces near the city Toroj, killing 60 of the Sudanese army and militia and destroying 3 armored vehicles. They also stated that they took over armored vehicles and artillery guns with a number of ammunition and fuel.

On 9 December the SAF and the SPLM-N both claimed victory in battle in South Kordofan. The SPLM-N claimed to have killed 40 members of the Central Reserves Police, including the head of the team. They also said that three Land Cruisers loaded with guns were destroyed; three artilleriy pieces and tens of light weapons, including RBG 7 and BKM machine guns were captured. They also claimed to have dispersed militias of the NCP under the leadership of Kafi Tayar who attacked Dalkoma, ten kilometers south of Kadugli, resulting in nine deaths.

SPLM-N fighters in South Kordofan reported turning back Sudanese army forces attempting to dislodge them from positions in Warni on 10 December, as well as the capture of the localities of Abu al-Hassan and al-Rashad three days earlier. The battles left 19 dead, according to a spokesman for the group.

By 12 December, fighting had shifted to Taruje, near the border with South Sudan. In a related skirmish, South Sudanese and Sudanese regular divisions clashed at Jau, a disputed town on the border, in what a Sudanese army spokesman described as a victory for Khartoum's soldiers.

On 25 December, JEM leader Khalil Ibrahim was intercepted and killed along with 30 of his fighters in North Kordofan, west of Wad Banda. Sudanese state media reported Ibrahim was defeated in fighting with the army. JEM confirmed Ibrahim's death, but said he had been killed by an airstrike, not in combat with Sudanese ground troops. Ibrahim's death came a day after JEM fighters attacked three villages in the state.

=== 2012 ===
==== January–April ====
By early January, reports of malnutrition and hunger increased in the conflict-afflicted zones. According to the United Nations, close to 417,000 people had been displaced, including 80,000 who fled to South Sudan.

By 20 January, heavy clashes broke out in Blue Nile state between the SAF and the SPLM-N with the SPLM-N claiming to have destroyed an army helicopter that was trying to rescue some troops. In the clashes 26 soldiers and 7 rebels were killed. Also 6 rebels were wounded.

On 26 February, the SRF claimed to have killed up to 130 Sudanese soldiers in an attack on a Sudanese garrison around Lake Obyad, near the border with South Sudan.

South Sudan accused Sudan of bombing two of their oil wells using its air force on 1 March, destroying both structures, which Sudan denied. The incident raised fears that war could break out between the two countries.

On 6 March of this month the JEM and Sudanese army clashed in North Darfur. The JEM claimed to beat and killed soldiers, and destroyed vehicles and weapons belonging to government troops.

On 26 March, the Sudanese air force bombed areas of Unity state in South Sudan, and sent army and militia forces across the border. South Sudanese forces counter-attacked and seized control of the Heglig oil fields as South Sudan's President Salva Kiir warned of war.

On March 30, more fighting was reported in the border area between the Sudanese Army and rebels.

On 1 April, the SRF claimed to have the control of Heglig, were they killed hundreds of government soldiers, forced others to flee and seized many of their weapons and armoured vehicles. Also SLM-AW claimed to have beaten government soldiers in Darfur, were they destroyed eight vehicles and seized one loaded with weapons.

On 12 and 13 April, the rebels claimed to have killed 79 government troops and captured another nine in two ambushes in the mountainous terrain, about 35 kilometres south of the Blue Nile state capital of Ed Damazin. For their part they stated three of their fighters were killed and seven wounded in the fighting. The government had no comment on the claim. The previous week the rebels also stated that they killed 13 soldiers for the loss of one rebel in an ambush 20 kilometres (12 miles) south of Ed Damazin. The government denied those losses.

On 15 April, government troops took control of Mugum, a stronghold of the pro-southern rebels, in the Blue Nile state, near South Sudan's border. The government news service claimed, per an "informed" military source, that 25 rebels were killed. On the 9 of May, SRF withdrew from Gereida after taken the control of the city some days before, were SLM-AW claimed to have killed 17 soldiers, destroyed a tank and six trucks along with the army's weapon stores.

==== July–September ====
On 3 July, fighting between the Sudanese Armed Forces and an Arab rebel movement broke out in West Darfur, rebels destroyed 10 government cars and captured 25 soldiers, also six rebels were killed, four injured and two captured.

On 6 July, a state official of Sudan was killed among 7 others in an attack on a government convoy. Ibrahim Balandiya, South Kordofan's parliament speaker, was attacked between two villages in the region. He is the most senior official to be killed during the whole conflict, according to state news agencies. Sudan blamed the SPLM-N for the attack which also killed another state official. The other official was Faisal Bashir, the head of South Kordofan's strategic planning committee, according to SUNA.

On 24 July, Sudan army says that they killed 50 JEM rebels and destroyed several vehicles, but this was denied by the rebels

On 23 July, Sudan Revolutionary Front (SRF) clashed with government forces and militia in Kirkdy, South Kordofan and in Alhtbaun, North Kordofan. Rebels say that they killed or wounded dozens of government troops since the clashes started and they took control of two tanks and 20 vehicles.

On 25 July, clashes between SPLM-N and SAF resulted with 46 army soldiers killed, 32 wounded and 5 rebels killed. Rebels won the battle and took control of the area, Al Sanot County in South Kordofan.

On 29 July, rebels announced the destruction of a camp belonging to the Armed Forces in Al-Meiram area, South Kordofan. The SRF killed seven and injured three others of the government troops, including the camp commander, ranked captain. Also, they seized one vehicle and destroyed another. In addition, they seized large quantities of weapons and ammunition. Also 1 rebels was killed and another was injured.

On 3 June, SRF forces claimed to have defeated government in Fataha in Al Lait Jar al Naby locality in North Darfur, capturing 18 of their vehicles. Sudanese authorities claimed to killed 40 rebels, destroying many trucks and losing some soldiers, but this was denied by the rebels.

On 7 June, seven government troops were killed and six missing in Tabaldi in East Darfur after clashes with the Sudan Revolutionary Front.

On 26 June, SRF forces attacked a government convoy in the village of Dugu Al Umda, close to Al Malam in South Darfur, killing up to 100 soldiers, capturing 60 vehicles and destroying 5. Also 3 rebels were injured.

By 1 August, SPLM-N accused the government forces of killed, wounded and abducted dozens of people in South Kordofan. A number of villages in the El-Abbasiya Tagaley county, South Kordofan, were burned. Rebels who were protecting these villages clashed with government forces, killing 17 of them and wounding 27 others.

An army vehicle traveling in the western part of South Kordofan was ambushed on the 21 of August, the Sudan Revolutionary Front has announced. The ambush on the road between Muglad and Babanusa left dead 11 army troops. The attack was carried by SLM-MM troops.

On 22 August, clashes between SPLA-North and SAF were reported in the villages of El-Houta and El-Daein, in Rashad Locality South Kordofan. Sudanese Revolutionary Front allegedly killed 17 and injured another 24 soldiers of the Sudanese Armed Forces (SAF) and pro-government militias also two Land Cruiser vehicles and a truck were destroyed during a battle. One SRF soldier was killed and another two were injured during the battle.

In the 25 of August, Sudanese army claimed to have killed 17 rebels and wounding dozens in South Kordofan, and they retaken the control of Al Murib. Their spokesman added that 1 of his soldiers was killed and another nine were injured. On the other hand, SRF announced killing 61 SAF and pro-government militias' soldiers, and injuring dozens. Rebel troops also seized large quantities of weapons and ammunition. They also confirmed the loss of five SPLA-N soldiers and injuring seven other soldiers.

On 6 September, the Sudanese army claimed to have killed 77 rebels. Forty-five of them were killed in Hajar Al-Doum, South Kordofan, and the 32 others were killed in Al-Aradeep Al-Ashara, North Darfur, also they claimed to have destroyed 10 of the rebel armed vehicles.

Heavy clashes were reported since the 7 of September in several areas. In El-Aradib El-Ashara area, which is under SRF control, government forces were able to evacuate 85 bodies and 25 injured soldiers in large trucks. SRF confirmed they were in control of El-Aradib El-Ashara area as well as defeating government forces in Khazzan Tunjur area. Adam Saleh, official spokesperson of SLM-Minnawi, denied the Sudanese army's claim that 32 SRF soldiers were killed and ten of their cars were destroyed in East Jebel Marra. SRF in South Kordofan announced on September 8 that they managed to defeat government troops in the 'Kilo 50' area, between El-Dibab and El-Muglad. Clashes were also reported in the Nuba Mountains, where SRF (belonging to SPLM-N) announced defeating government troops and militias attempting to occupy the villages of Dloka and Daldako South and northeast of Kadugli city, also SLA troops killed 9 government soldiers and injuring 25 other government soldiers.

On 20 September, heavy clashes between SLA-MM and SAF occurred in Kolghe, East Jebel Marra, North Darfur, where 80 government soldiers and 1 rebel were killed. Rebels also got 1 injured, but their forces seized 12 Land Cruisers loaded with different weapons and mortars, 12 rifles, 14 Dushkas and one vehicle holding two long-range Hauser missiles. Sudanese Air Forces destroyed two army vehicles carrying heavy weapons, which the SRF was trying to seize.

On 25 September, SLM-MM forces killed dozens of government soldiers and pro-government militias and destroying 5 of their vehicles during the clashes, which took place in Hashaba area.

Clashes took place between Tabit and Shangil Tobai, East Jebel Marra, North Darfur, on 27 September where joint troops of SLM-Minnawi, Justice and Equality Movement (JEM) and SLM-Abdel Wahid fought together and killed and injured dozens, they also completely destroyed 180 vehicles belonging to the SAF and to pro-government militias. Rebels captured these area. According to the SAF, 70 rebels were killed and only 12 army soldiers were slain. On its turn, the SRF announced that as a result of last Thursday's battle, 84 government troops were killed and several got injured. In addition, they claimed to have seized 23 small vehicles carrying light and heavy munition, three trucks, fuel and four trucks loaded with munition and other supplies.

==== October–December ====
Mustafa Tambor, spokesman of SLM-Abdul Wahid, announced the killing of 22 Sudanese government troops on Monday, 1 October. He said they attacked a government convoy traveling from Ribeige locality in North Kordofan to Al-Aiyd Jaranebi locality, in North Darfur. They also seized 16 of the vehicles and burned another nine.

By 14 October, SRF killed 21 army soldiers and 7 pro-government militias in a battle against government forces in South Kordofan, on October 14. Government forces claimed to have captured 1 rebel. By the same day, rebels announced that their troops managed to clear the area of Surkum, Blue Nile, and that the government troops suffered heavy losses during the battles. SRF troops seized two tanks and two Land Cruiser vehicles from the government. Also SRF troops killed seven government troops' elements in the battle, including a lieutenant in South Kordofan. Government claimed to have killed 12 rebels, injured another dozen and captured one who were attacking the village of Um Dehilib, in Kalogi locality.

By the 15th of this month, JEM and SAF forces clashed in the area of Umm Zeifah, South Kordofan, where dozens of government forces were killed, including the force commander. The rebels destroyed three army vehicles and seized two another two that were carrying large quantities ammunition and weapons.

On 18 October, clashes were reported in the area of Abu Delek southeast of El-Fasher. 63 government troops were killed and dozens injured during the battle, SRF troops seized 19 Land Cruiser vehicles and destroyed eight other vehicles, as well as seizing several light and heavy machine guns and ammunition. 1 SRF soldier was killed and 3 others were injured. After the battle SRF troops were in full control of the area of Abu Delek.

The Sudan People's Liberation Army-North (SPLA-N) announced killing 6 Sudanese military troops in South Kordofan on 22 October, a Sudanese soldier was also captured and rebels also seized weapons and ammunition from the army vehicles.

The Sudan People Liberation Movement-North (SPLM-N) announced it killed 30 Sudanese government troops and injured another 25, in East El-Leri, South Kordofan on 31 October when the rebel group attacked and destroyed a camp of government troops and seized their guns and weapons. 1 SPLM-N soldier was killed during the battle and that another 4 got lightly wounded.

The Sudan People Liberation Movement-North (SPLM-N) announced to have killed 70 Sudanese government troops and wounded another 150 on 2 November. In addition, six SPLM-N soldiers were killed and 16 got injured. The clashes occurred in Del Da'ako northeast of Kadugli, South Kordofan.

By 7 November, SPLM-N forces claimed to have shot down an Antonov airplane after it carried out air bombings in South Kordofan. On the same day, SPLM-N ambushed and killed 10 Sudanese soldiers between Hajar-jawad and Angarko villages, on the Kadugli-Dilling highway.

Clashes between troops of the Sudan Revolutionary Front (SRF) and the Sudanese army on November 9 in Wadi Murrah, near Tabet in North Darfur, reportedly killed and injured more than 100 elements of the Sudanese army.SLM-MM also captured 7 soldiers and six vehicles loaded with Katyusha rockets, three vehicles with anti-aircraft missiles and five loaded with food and medicine.4 rebels were killed and another 10 were injured.

The Sudan Revolutionary Front (SRF) reportedly destroyed a Sudanese army camp in Alhigairat, located west of the Kadugli airport, killing 23 soldiers from the Sudan Armed Forces (SAF) on 14 November. Many other Sudanese soldiers got injured and another 11 were captured during the attack, 1 rebel was killed and another 11 got slightly injured. Rebels found six women and two children in the army camp, who were 'taken to safer area'. The SRF also seized one 12.7mm machine gun, one mortar 82mm, four mortars 60mm, four R.P.G-7s, four P.K.M machine guns and a large quantity of various ammunition and shells.

The Sudan Liberation Movement led by Abdelwahid (SLM-AW) announced killing 83 Sudanese soldiers in the area of Ed el-Nabq, in Kabkabiya locality, North Darfur on 23 November. Four other soldiers were wounded. Rebels also seized "heavy and light weapons, various types of ammunition and five Land Cruiser vehicles".

SPLA-N forces ambushed Sudan Armed Forces (SAF) patrolling troops on the road between Kaluba village and Alfaid village, west of Rhada city on November 24. 6 members of the SAF were killed.

On 5 December, Sudanese army claimed victory over LJM rebels in the western gate of El-Fasher, killing 2 of them, capturing 3 rebels and 3 vehicles.

On 10 December 2012, the Sudanese army, reinforced by a few paramilitaries of the Popular Defense Forces, attacked the Sudan People Liberation Movement-North (SPLM-N) in Daldoko, northeast of Kadugli, South Kordofan. The attack was made from two direction : a diversionary direct attack and a main flank maneuver. This latter forces was ambushed and repelled. According to the rebels, after a first T-55 tank was destroyed, the government soldiers fled, abandoning 4 other tanks. On next day, the movement announced 27 government soldiers had been killed and 3 captured while 3 rebels had been killed and 11 wounded in the clashes. The rebel movement claimed to have seized seven tanks from the army, five of which in good condition, while the other two were destroyed. Besides, two "big cars" were reportedly confiscated, and three mounted Land Cruisers, one was in good condition and the other two were destroyed. The capture of 4 T-55 and 1 BRDM-2 has been confirmed by an independent report. On 12 December, the Sudanese army lost at least another BRDM-2 and one BTR-80A in another combat.

The SPLM-N claimed on 16 December that government forces attacked several localities in the Nuba Mountains. The rebels claimed to have killed 12 Sudanese soldiers and wounding another 16, also 3 rebels were injured in the clashes.

On 15 December, 8 Sudanese soldiers were killed and another 4 injured after a fighting in a dispute between them in the garrison of Mornei, located on the north side of the city.

On 16 December, a wrongly Sudanese Air Force airstrike killed 27 of its own soldiers and left four army vehicles destroyed and dozens of soldiers injured in the area of Bir Jaber in East Jebel Marra.

By 17 December, SLM-AW rebels attacked an army convoy in an area west of Kabkabiya, North Darfur, killing 18 of them. On a different event, the Justice and Equality Movement (JEM) claims to have captured the army Lieutenant Tahir Ahmed Ibrahim, from White Nile, and seized three vehicles mounted with heavy artillery and three dushkas, along with a large amount of fuel.

On 18 December SLM-AW killed more than 20 Sudanese soldiers in an attack on an army base in Jebel Moon, locality of Seleia in West Darfur, also seized six military vehicles loaded with arms and ammunition. 2 rebels were killed in the attack.

A fierce battle between the Sudan Armed Forces (SAF) and the Sudan Revolutionary Forces (SRF) of Abdel Wahid left tens of combatants killed in West Jebel Marra area, Central Darfur, the battle on 23 December and finished the next day. According to the SRF the government lost over 90 people, while the rebels reported at least 7 fatal casualties and 10 wounded combatants. The SRF claimed to have captured the major SAF base in the central town of Golo, leaving the government with only two strongholds in Jebel Marra. The rebels, of SLM-AW faction, destroyed the entire base and captured 15 pick up trucks and weapons.

On 28 of December, SLM-AW rebels captured two key garrison towns of the Sudan Armed Forces in Darfur, where 47 government soldiers and 2 rebels were killed. Also 4 rebels were injured.

=== 2013 ===
==== January–April ====
On 7 January, heavy fighting between SAF and SLM-AW rebels in West Jebel Marra, Central Darfur left 70 soldiers and 5 rebels dead, other 7 rebels were injured. Rebels also destroyed 25 government Land Cruisers and seized another 11 vehicles loaded with weapons. Rebels claimed to be currently in full control of the Jildu garrison.

But on 9 January, Sudanese army claimed to have the control of Jildu after killing 30 of the rebels.

On 13 January, Sudanese army claimed to have clashed with SPLM-N rebels in the areas of El-Homra and El-Ehemer, South Kordofan, killing 50 of them, destroying 4 of their tanks and losing several soldiers. This was denied by the rebels, who claimed that 43 government troops were killed, hundreds were injured and two army tanks and two Land Cruisers were destroyed in the battles. They added the SAF killed 8 rebels, injured 21 and destroyed 2 of their tanks.

By the same day SLJM rebels claimed to have killed more than 25 government troops and its militias in a combat in South Darfur. Also 3 rebels were killed the rebels had two of their vehicles destroyed but managed to seize several heavily armed Land Cruisers and ammunition belonging to the military. One army garrison was destroyed.

On 19 January, Sudanese government forces attacked the SPLM-N in the village of Al-Shifir, South Kordofan, where 4 government soldiers and 2 rebels were killed, also 4 were injured.

On 6 February, a battle near Golo, Central Darfur, left 52 Sudanese soldiers and 5 SLM-AW rebels killed. Rebels also captured 13 soldiers, seized 21 Land Cruisers and damaged three vehicles belonging to the army.

On the next day, SLM-AW rebels seized a military bade near Golo, killing 123 Sudanese soldiers and capturing nine Land Cruisers mounted with Dushkas and three long-range missiles belonging to the army. Also rebels had 3 killed and others wounded.

On 12 February, SLM-AW rebels clashed with SAF in the area of Carmel, east of Golo, where the rebels defeated the army, killing 39 Sudanese soldiers. They also captured two Land Cruisers loaded with weapons and destroyed five others, all of which belonged to the government.

On 14 February, SLM-MM and JEM rebels battle with government forces in the area of Umm Gunja in Bilel locality, near Nyala in South Darfur, killing 87 soldiers, capturing another 9 and capturing 11 of their vehicles.

On 20 February, the Sudanese army claimed to liberate the area of Mapho in South Kordofan, killing 66 SPLM-N rebels and wounding another 70, destroying a tank, four Land Cruiser vehicles and two tractors, and suffering several casualties. This information was denied by the rebels.

The next day, SPLM-N forces expelled government forces from the area of Mapho in Blue Nile state. Sudanese army admitted the rebel victory, and to have suffered big losses in the battle.

On 25 February, SLM-Juba Unity rebels claimed to have killed 17 Sudanese soldiers in clashes on the area of Al Aradeeb Al Ashara, East Jebel Marra in North Darfur. The movement claimed destroying 9 cars and seizing 4 Land Cruiser vehicles mounted with Dushka's machine guns. In addition, the movement's leader stated five Sudanese soldiers were captured. Abdel Shafi said that 2 of the movement's men were killed during the battle and 3 men were injured.

On 4 March, Sudanese army claimed victory over JEM rebels in the Wad Bahr village in Wad Banda locality in North Kordofan after the rebels entered in the country from South Sudan, killing many of them. Rebels denied this, but they claimed to fight with SAF forces in the same area killing 100 soldiers and seizing 25 Land Cruisers, two Ural trucks, two commander tanks and score of weapons.

A joint rebel offensive (JEM and SLM-MM) in the road connecting Tawila and El Fasher in the area of Kuim, North Darfur, killed 25 Sudanese soldiers, captured many soldiers and 2 armed vehicles and destroyed more.

The rebel groups Sudan Liberation Movement for Justice (SLMJ of Karbino) and Sudan Liberation Movement- Unity (SLM-Unity of Abdullah Yahiya) claimed an attack on Abu Tira convoy in north of El Fasher in North Darfur, killing 7 of them and capturing 1 vehicle. 2 rebels were killed and another was injured.

On 12 March, SPLM-N rebels and SAF forces clashed in the Blue Nile State. In the battle SAF claimed to have killed 40 rebels, destroyed a tank and two vehicles belonging to the rebels and confiscated quantities of heavy weapons and ammunition. Rebels claimed to have killed 16 soldiers, wounded another 26 and destroyed 7 of their vehicles.

On 15 March, heavy clashes between SLM-MM rebels and government forces left hundreds of people killed. Rebels killed 260 government soldiers; 170 soldiers and 90 militias; captured 36 officers and seized 23 vehicles. According to rebels, 3 of their soldier were killed and 6 were injured. Rebels gained the control of Abga Radji Biaman area. According to the Sudanese government 100 rebels were killed or injured in the battles and 14 of their vehicles were destroyed.

On 6 April, clashes between SLM-MM and government forces in South Darfur left dozens killed on both sides.

On 7 April, SLM-MM rebels seized Muhajeriya in East Darfur, killing up to 70 Sudanese soldiers and destroying 2 armed Land Cruisers.

On 8 April, clashes between SLM-MM seized the village of Ishma at about 8 kilometers from Nyala in South Darfur, where 100 government soldiers and several rebels were killed. SAF forces also lost 4 heavily armed vehicles.

On the same day, the rebel groups SLMJ and SLA-AW killed 18 Sudanese soldiers when they seized the Dobbo garrison in North Darfur. The rebel forces seized food, weapons and five Land Cruisers belonging to the SAF besides destroying a Renault truck and a Land Cruiser vehicle.

On 14 April, SLM-MM rebels seized a military base in South Darfur located in a strategic region. 40 Sudanese soldiers were killed during the takeover.SLA-MM also seized two vehicles and a large number of weapons belonging to the Sudanese army.

On 16 April, 15 Sudanese soldiers and 4 SPLM-N rebels were killed when the rebels captured the Dandor garrison near Kadulgi, rebels also captured three trucks, three Korean-made jeeps mounted with Dushkas MG, in addition to mortars and several different types of ammunition.

On 18 April, SLM-AW rebels captured two garrisons near Nyala in South Darfur, killing 17 Sudanese soldiers, captured many weapons and ammunition, and 10 Land Cruisers mounted with heavy artillery.

On 22 April, SLM-MM rebels attacked the Nyala airport, and defeated government forces in Morla, killing 100 of them, capturing 10 vehicles and destroying another 13 and 1 tank. But Sudanese army claimed to be in control of Morla, where they claimed to killed dozens of rebels. Rebels deniyed this and claimed that only 5 of their fighters were killed.

==== May–June ====
On 8 May, rebel forces claimed to have killed 60 government soldier who were trying to recapture the city of Abu Karshola, South Kordofan. Also 9 soldier were captured and a MIG aircraft was shooting down.

By 14 May, rebels killed 411 Sudanese soldiers who were trying again to recapture Abu Karshola, SRF forces destroyed 37 military vehicles. They also captured a tracked armoured vehicle and five large trucks, as well as 26 Land Cruisers loaded with weapons, ammunition, machine guns and other equipment. Also 44 soldiers were captured. But some days later, rebels made a tactical withdrawal from the city.

On 27 May, SPLM-N rebels and SAF forces both claimed victory over the Dandor garrison east of Kadugli, capital of South Kordofan. Rebels killed many Sudanese soldiers and destroyed a tank and two Land Cruiser vehicles loaded with weapons, for the loss of five SRF men killed in the battle. The Sudanese government claimed to have killed 70 rebels in the fighting.

On 31 May, rebels attacked again Abu Karshola, downing a chopper (the 6 soldiers inside were killed) and killing 30 and capturing 3 Sudanese soldiers. The SRF also captured a Land Cruiser with ten 120mm mortars and destroyed another five similar vehicles loaded with weapons.

On 4 June SLM-MM killed 46 Sudanese soldiers in a battle in the Tor Taan region in South Darfur. Rebels also captured 24 vehicles in good condition and various types of ammunition and rocket launchers. This is in addition to the 80 fuel tankers the SLA-MM claim to have captured in the previous days.

On 9 June, a new rebel attack on Abu Karshola killed 14 Sudanese soldiers and captured another 5.

On 10 June, SLM-AW rebels clashed with SAF forces in south of the Thur area, Central Darfur, killing 29 soldiers, seizing seven fuel tankers with a capacity of 250 barrels and destroying one military truck and two Land Cruisers.

On 11 June, SPLM-N troops started attacking near and inside the South Kordofan capital, Kadugli, making heavy casualties to the government forces. In the 14 of June 9 SAF soldiers were killed and a MIG aircraft was destroyed.

On 19 June, SPLM-N rebels killed 5 Sudanese soldiers and injured another 8 in the upper Nile.

By 26 June, SLM-MM rebels killed 7 Sudanese soldiers in a battle in North Darfur. They also captured 4 armed vehicles.

==== July–December ====
2 July - Forces of the Justice and Equality Movement (JEM) reportedly clashed with Sudan Armed Forces (SAF) contingents on Tuesday, 53 kilometres from the town of Dilling In South Kordofan.

4 July - The spokesman for the Sudan People's Liberation Army-North (SPLA-N) claims his forces have "defeated and captured" Ambir army base in Rashad locality, South Kordofan on Thursday. Arnu Ngutulu Lodi told Radio Dabanga that 24 members of the Sudan Armed Forces (SAF) were killed in the battle, and "several were wounded". The SPLA-N claims to have lost two men and 13 have minor injuries.

9 July - The Sudan People's Liberation Army-North (SPLA-N) claims to have destroyed two separate Sudan Armed Forces (SAF) patrols in the Nuba Mountains area of South Kordofan, killing 26 government troops, for the loss of "one dead and three slightly wounded".

16 July - The Sudan Revolutionary Front (SRF) claims to have killed seven government troops and captured two officers in a clash in Rashad locality in South Kordofan on Monday.

28 July - Reports of ongoing clashes in South Kordofan between formations of the Sudan Armed Forces (SAF) and contingents of the Sudan Revolutionary Front (SRF), apparently spearheaded by the Justice and Equality Movement (JEM), have continued to reach Radio Dabanga all weekend. JEM deputy head, Mohamed Al Beel Issa Zayyed, claimed that the SRF has "killed more than 52 regular troops and pro-government militiamen, including leading figures Amir Al Mujehedin Aburahman Abu Fursha as well as Rahman Jigir.

19 August - The Sudan Revolutionary Front (SRF) claim to have killed 15 "Sudanese army and government militiamen" on Monday, after attacking a military convoy near to Kas in South Darfur.

25 August - The Sudan Revolutionary Front (SRF) claim to have killed 22 pro-government militiamen, injured others, and destroyed their camps in the Dukan and Al Humbo areas of Geissan locality in Sudan's Blue Nile state.

31 August 2013, an SPLM-N spokesman announced a one-month unilateral cessation of hostilities due to the widespread floods in the region.

1 September - Sudanese rebel forces claim to have killed 10 and injured more than 30 troops of the Sudan Armed Forces (SAF) and pro-government militias in action on Saturday in Bau locality, Blue Nile state.

13 October - The Sudanese Liberation Movement for Justice (LMJ-Karbino) claim to have killed 19 members of the Sudanese Armed Forces and pro-government militias, injured others, and captured two, in the area of Um Sa'ouna, north of Ed Daein, capital of East Darfur.

22 October - Defectors from the Tijani Sese-led Liberation and Justice Movement (LJM), claim to have killed ten government troops during a battle with the Sudanese Armed Forces (SAF) in the area of Amarjadeed, East Jebel Marra.

27 October - The Sudanese Armed Forces (SAF) and Sudan Liberation Army led by Abdel Wahid (SLA-AW) have reportedly clashed in Mellit in North Darfur. A total of 18 people from both sides were killed, the rebels spokesman claims. In a statement issued on Saturday, the spokesperson for the SLM-AW, Abdelrahim Nimr, reported that the movement took control of Mellit town on Friday. According to Nimr, 16 militiamen were killed and a number of vehicles loaded with weapons and ammunition seized. Two of the movement's troops were killed.

28 October - The Liberation and Justice Movement, led by Ali Karbino (LJM-K), announced that they captured three Sudanese Armed Forces (SAF) troops during the clashes in Amarjadeed, north of Manawashi in South Darfur.

31 October - Troops of the Sudan Revolutionary Front (SRF) attacked the headquarters of the Central Reserve Forces (also known as Abu Tira) in the locality of Mershing, South Darfur. Witnesses say that three Abu Tira troops were killed and four others injured, including a civilian. The SRF said it lost one troop and three others were injured, while it "killed 37 government troops and militiamen".

3 November - The Sudan Revolutionary Front (SRF) announced that their troops launched an attack on a Sudanese Armed Forces battalion in the area of Nimra, East Jebel Marra, combined force of LJM-K troops and forces of Minni Minawi's Sudan Liberation Army (SLA-MM) and the Sudan Liberation Army-Abdel Wahid (SLM-AW) attacked a battalion consisting of 75 vehicles and four tanks, dozens of Sudanese Armed Forces (SAF) troops and government militias were killed and 10 SAF vehicles destroyed.

12 November - The Sudan Revolutionary Front (SRF) claims to have launched an attack on a battalion of Sudanese Armed Forces (SAF) and militias in the area of Deleima in South Kordofan. According to Zayed, the joint rebel forces killed more than 60 SAF and militia troops, including the battalion commander.

17 November - The Sudan Revolutionary Front (SRF - an alliance of Darfur, South Kordofan and Blue Nile rebel groups) announced that its troops entered the town of Abu Zabad, 150 km southwest of El Obeid, the capital of North Kordofan.

17 November 2013, JEM guerrillas launched an attack on the town of Abu Zabad, the attack was repulsed.JEM's second deputy general commander Mohamed Rahouma was killed in the skirmish.

On 20 November 2013, Sudanese troops recaptured the Kaling area of South Kordofan from SRF rebels, who relocated to the Rashad district.

21 November - The Sudan People's Liberation Movement-North (SPLM-N) forces of the rebel alliance Sudan Revolutionary Front (SRF) have allegedly regained control of Kalinji village in the Nuba Mountains, South Kordofan.

1 December - The Sudan Revolutionary Front claims to have killed more than 100 Sudanese army and militia troops in an attack on three military convoys south of Abu Zabad, near the border between North and South Kordofan.

3 December - Forces of the Sudan People's Liberation Movement-North (SPLM-N) claim to have destroyed a Sudanese army camp in Fayu, west of Dalami in the Nuba Mountains, South Kordofan state, causing heavy casualties to the Sudanese army.

10 December - The Sudan Armed Forces (SAF) and the Sudanese People's Liberation Movement-North (SPLM-N) have clashed in Blue Nile State, southwest of Damazin, the capital of the state. The rebels reported at least one casualty from their side, while they claim that the army lost at least ten soldiers.

13 December - The Sudan Revolutionary Front (SRF) attacked the Sudanese army at about 6 am on Friday morning in the area of Abata, 20 km north-east of Zalingei, the capital of Central Darfur. At least 19 soldiers were either killed or injured, according to an eyewitness.

17 December - The Sudan Revolutionary Front (SRF) shelled military targets inside Kadugli on Wednesday, according to the spokesperson for the Sudan People's Liberation Movement-North (SPLM-N).

20 December - Forces of the Sudan Liberation Movement led by Abdel Wahid announced the destruction of the Duma military base north of the city of Nyala, in South Darfur's Mershing locality, Sudan Revolutionary Front, killed 27 government troops and captured six vehicles loaded with guns.

24 December - Darfur armed rebel movements announced the killing of 18 Sudan Armed Forces (SAF) and militia troops on Tuesday in an attack on the Katila garrison in South Darfur.

27 December - The Sudan People's Liberation Army-North (SPLA-N) in Blue Nile state claims to have destroyed patrolling forces of the Sudanese army in Bowrgo area, 30 km south of Damazin, force commander Maaz Ahmed Bagir Najib of the 4th Division in Damazin was killed.

30 December - The Sudan Liberation Movement, led by Abdel Wahid El Nur (SLM-AW), announced that its forces attacked the Disa military garrison in North Darfur, killing 23 army and militia troops, and seized three army vehicles loaded with a variety of arms. Three SLM troops were killed and two others wounded.

=== 2014 ===
==== January–June ====
5 January - Sudan Revolutionary Front (SRF) forces reportedly attacked a Sudanese army battalion in Wadi Eweiji, north of Kutum, North Darfur, killing 41 Sudanese army and militia troops. Dozens of army and militia troops were reportedly killed on Saturday by rebel forces in the area of Trogi, south of Kadugli, the capital of South Kordofan., 314 government forces were killed, including a colonel and a captain.

7 January - The Sudan Revolutionary Front (SRF) announced the killing of nine Sudanese military police troops this morning in an attack on a military convoy near Nierteti in Central Darfur.

8 January - The Sudan Revolutionary Front (SRF) announced that the combined forces of the Sudan People's Liberation Movement-North (SPLM-N) and the Sudan Liberation Movement, led by Abdel Wahid El Nur, on Wednesday destroyed the military garrison of Dalami, Habila locality, in South Kordofan.

On 9 January, clashes have erupted between the Sudanese army and rebels in the southern town of Dallami in South Kordofan State, the military spokesman says.

13 January - The Liberation Movement for Justice (LMJ) presided by Taher Hajar (militarily led by Ali Karbino) announced it attacked this afternoon (Monday) the Sunta military garrison in South Darfur. More than 13 Sudanese Armed Forces (SAF) and militia troops were allegedly killed.

17 January - The Sudan People's Liberation Movement-North (SPLM-N) claimed the killing of 74 Sudanese army and militia troops in a battle in the area of Malkan, Blue Nile state, on Friday. Both the army and the rebels continue to claim they are in control of Malkan.

22 January - The Liberation Movement for Justice (LMJ), led by Ali Karbino, announced that its forces took control of the Kalaimendo garrison in North Darfur, The rebels claim to have killed 20 government troops.

On 26 January, Sudanese Air Force have launched air strikes against a key rebel-held town Kauda in South Kordofan, but there were no reports of casualties.

26 January - The Sudan Revolutionary Front (SRF) reported that its troops attacked a military convoy in South Darfur, rebels claimed that nine government and militia troops were killed.

On 12 February, in an explosion landmine killed five people and thirteen wounded in the South Kurdufan in north of Sudan. Sudanese media almost never give casualty reports from Kurdufan or Blue Nile, where government troops and rebels of the Sudan People's Liberation Movement - North (SPLM-N) have been fighting since 2011.

26 February - The Sudan Liberation Movement, led by Minni Minawi (SLM-MM) announced that on Wednesday they killed 20 militiamen in a battle with Rapid Support Forces in South Darfur.

2 March - Joint rebel forces killed 83 army and militia troops in attacks on the military garrisons of Alliet Jarelnabi and Haskanita, North Darfur.

5 March - Darfur rebel forces announced full control of three localities in North Darfur, Alliet, El Taweisha, and Kalamindo. The total of government troops killed in the battle of El Taweisha is 48.

13 March - The Darfur rebel forces announced taking control of Mellit in North Darfur, The joint Darfur rebel forces claimed that a total of 97 forces died, but only 78 according to the Government.

On 13 March, Sudanese authorities sentenced SPLM-N commanders Malik Agar and Yassir Arman as well as 15 fighters to death.

16 March - In the area of Kulkul, north of El Fasher, the capital of North Darfur, 83 Sudanese army and militia troops were killed, and dozens of others injured during an attack by the "Darfur joint resistance forces".

17 March - The "Darfur joint resistance forces" claim to have killed 44 government and militia troops in East Jebel Marra.

On 16 April 2014, Sudanese armed forces official al-Sawarmi Khalid stated that in the aftermath of the second phase of the Operation Decisive Summer the eastern areas of South Kordofan have been completely clear out of militants.

28 April - The Sudan Liberation Movement, under the leadership of Abdel Wahid El Nur (SLM-AW), announced that they attacked the military garrison of Rokoro in Central Darfur, 27 Sudanese army and militia troops were killed.

1 May - The Sudan People's Liberation Movement-North (SPLM-N) announced that they killed 22 Sudanese army and militia troops in South Kordofan.

1 May - The Sudan Liberation Movement, led by Abdel Wahid El Nur (SLM-AW) has announced that it destroyed the military base of Turo, near Golo, west of Jebel Marra, 15 army and militia troops were killed, and others injured.

16 May - The forces of the Sudan People's Liberation Movement-North (SPLM-N) claimed on Thursday to have destroyed two Sudanese military convoys which tried to occupy areas in Abu Jubeiha and Talodi localities in South Kordofan state. They have killed at least 65 soldiers, the SPLM-N spokesman stated, and have lost 11 troops.

19 May - The Justice and Equality Movement faction led by Bakhit Dabjo (JEM-Sudan) announced the killing of 30 army and militia troops in the area of Galab in North Darfur.

On 6 June, Sudanese army spokesman al-Sawarmi Khaled Saad said that the troops captured a rebel position in South Kordofan. At noon today our armed forces liberated Al-Atmur region, which is a military base where the (SPLM-N) rebels stocked heavy weapons, including cannons and multiple rocket launchers.

Also on 6 June - The spokesman for the Sudan Armed Forces (SAF), Colonel El Sawarmi Khalid Saad, announced that the army and the paramilitary Rapid Support Forces (RSF) liberated an area near Kadugli, the capital of South Kordofan.

9 June - The Sudanese People's Liberation Army – North (SPLA-N) and government forces claim to have inflicted 'heavy casualties' on each other's forces in South Kordofan and Nuba Mountains. According to rebels, they lost 3 men.

On 17 June, U.S. ambassador in the United Nations Samantha Power condemned Sudan's use of barrel bombs and accused Sudan of purposely bombing hospitals and civilian facilities in the South Kordofan and Blue Nile states.

On 29 June, Sudanese troops and rebels engaged in heavy fighting near the city of Kadugli the state capital of South Kordofan.

29 June - The Sudan People's Liberation Movement-North (SPLM-N) announced that it killed 15 army and militia troops, and wounded others in El Atmor, South Kordofan.

==== July–December ====
24 November 2014, SPLM rebels claimed to have launched two attacks on government positions in the Blue Nile region. The claims were disputed by Sudanese officials, who stated that the Sudanese army clashed with rebels in the towns of Yabous and Shali.

On 1 December 2014, SPLM militants clashed with government forces in the Alahimr area of South Kordofan, both sides accused each other of starting the offensive in the area.

On 3 December 2014, the Sudanese army claimed to have killed 50 rebels during clashes in the villages of Balanja and al-Atmour in South Kordofan.

On 8 December 2014, clashes between militants and government forces clashed in South Kordofan.

On 9 December 2014, Sudanese authorities declared that ceasefire negotiations with the rebels have ended without a positive result. The reason behind the failure was the demand by rebels to conduct joint negotiations with the rebels in Darfur. A week earlier a big number of opposition parties signed a unity agreement with SPLM-N in order to support it in the negotiations.

On 12 December 2014, SPLA-N insurgents captured the al-Daldako and Ruseiris and Jabal Nimir areas of South Kordofan. Guerrillas seized three cannons, a tank and three military vehicles, inflicting heavy casualties to the Sudanese troops. The Sudanese government responded by resuming the Operation Decisive Summer in the above-mentioned areas as well as Darfur.

On 24 December 2014, SPLA-N guerrillas killed 25 SAF troops during fighting in the vicinity of Dalouka also seizing weaponry in an abandoned military camp located in Tourlake.

On 27 December 2014, a SPLA-N press release stated that a Sudanese air force Antonov aircraft had crashed in the Al-Shai'r area of South Kordofan, rebels claimed that six SAF soldiers perished in the incident.

=== 2015 ===
On 1 January 2015, a video interview with SPLM-N commander Koko Idriss was released, Idriss claimed that during the past 3 weeks SPLM-N clashed with government troops in Balinga, Daldako, al-Atmoor and al-Ruseiris, Gardoud with the later falling under Sudanese control. The video displayed 44 Dushka cannons,13 Land Cruiser vehicles, 2 oil tankers, and a T 55 tank allegedly captured by the rebels. Idriss further stated that 3 SPLM-N fighters were killed and 15 wounded during the clashes also accusing Sudan of employing child soldiers. The video also contained accusations of heavy Sudanese aerial bombings on residential areas of the region.

On 2 January 2015, SPLM-N pledged to destroy its stockpiles of anti-personnel landmines. Rebels also announced that 20 government soldiers will be released from captivity in response to talks with the Sa'ihoon group.

On 11 January 2015, SPLM-N repulsed simultaneous SAF attacks on Dalouka, al-Qnezih, Medem Khor Damar and Teludi. A total of 13 government soldiers were killed in action while SPLM-N suffered 2 dead and 2 injured.

On 15 January 2015, SPLM-N claimed to have inflicted over 100 casualties to the Sudanese army, while at the same time capturing the Blinga camp along with various military equipment. SPLM-N estimated its own casualties at 1 killed and 14 wounded. At the same time a Sudanese spokesman issued a conflicting report declaring that SAF repulsed rebel attack on the al-Qneziah, Dalouka and Blinga areas, dealing heavy losses to the attackers.

On 16 January 2015, SPLM-N recaptured the towns of Ankarto and Um Turq-Turq. On the same day Sudan's humanitarian commission released a statement claiming that a total of 145,000 people have been internally displaced due to the conflict.

On 21 January 2015, SPLM-N announced the capture of the Talodi-Alnuba village following the fall of a government outpost in the area. According to a rebel spokesman military equipment was seized as Sudanese troops retreated to Talodi.

On 23 January 2015, SAF bombed a Doctors Without Borders hospital in the rebel held village of Frandala, one patient and one DFB volunteer were wounded, the hospital also sustained major material damage. The UN Office for the Coordination of Humanitarian Affairs condemned the attack.

On 26 January 2015, SPLM-N guerillas shot down a United Nations helicopter in an area east of Kadugli. The helicopter crew consisting solely of Bulgarian pilots managed to land the damaged vehicle, no casualties were reported. According to the UK based Sudan Social Development Organization, four people were wounded following indiscriminate shelling conducted by the Sudanese military, the incident occurred in the towns of Um Sirdiba and Alatmour.

On 1 February 2015, SPLM-N released 6 Bulgarian pilots previously captured on 26 January 2015.

On 8 February 2015, three Sudanese Red Crescent Society aid workers were killed in Kurmuk, Blue Nile state, after unknown assailants targeted their vehicle.

On 10 February 2015, a rebel ambush that took place outside Kurmuk, lead to the death of 4 government troops. On the same day Sudanese troops engaged guerrillas in the Angasama hills locale, four soldiers were killed and five were captured, as the rebels seized a number of assault rifles and vehicles.

On 24 February 2015, SPLM-N insurgents overrun the Kahliat garrison, located 5 kilometers west of Kadugli, 10 soldiers were killed and 2 rebels were injured in the aftermath of the skirmish.

On 22 March 2015, a rebel raid on the Bau garrison in Blue Nile led to the deaths of 8 soldiers and the injury of 4 insurgents, the attackers seized large amounts of weaponry and ammunition.

On 28 March 2015, SPLM-N announced the capture of the strategically located Habila town, 54 soldiers were allegedly killed and five military vehicles captured. A government spokesman claimed that the town remained outside rebel control, further accusing the rebels of torching and destroying civilian houses and market facilities.

On 11 April 2015, rebels carried out an ambush on SAF soldiers in the areas of Al-Dabkar and Al Abbasiya-Taqali, killing 13 SAF personnel.

=== 2016 ===
On June 18, 2016, the Sudanese President, Omar al-Bashir, declared a 4-month long ceasefire. Army spokesman Ahmed Khalifa al-Shami stated that the ceasefire was intended "to give the armed groups a chance to join the peace process and to surrender their arms.

The ceasefire was later extended in October to the end of the year and then on December 31, it was extended again by a whole month

=== 2017 ===
On January 16, 2017, Omar Al-Bashir extended the ceasefire by 6 months

On February 21, 2017, Sudan attacked SPLM-N positions in the area of the town of Kadugli, violating the ceasefire.

=== 2019 ===
On 11 April 2019, amid weeks of demonstrations and ongoing protests in the capital of Khartoum, Sudanese president Omar al-Bashir was removed from power in a coup d'état by the Sudanese Armed Forces after nearly 30 years in office. Vice president and defense minister Ahmed Awad Ibn Auf dissolved the government of al-Bashir and formed a military council to run the country.

On 17 April 2019, SPLM-N announced a suspension of hostilities in South Kordofan and Blue Nile state. The leader of SPLM-N, Abdulaziz al-Hilu, said in a statement released by the armed group, “As a goodwill gesture … to give a chance for an immediate transfer of power to civilians, I, commander of SPLM-N announce the suspending of hostilities for three months in all areas under its control until July 31, 2019.”

Two weeks after the ouster of Sudan's Omar Al Bashir, Uganda's foreign minister Okello Oryem, has announced that his country may offer Bashir refuge.

=== 2020 ===
On 31 August 2020, a comprehensive peace agreement was signed in Juba, South Sudan, between the Sudan's transitional government and the Sudan Revolutionary Front (SRF), except for Sudan People's Liberation Movement-North (SPLM–N) led by Abdelaziz al-Hilu and Sudan Liberation Movement/Army (SLM) led by Abdul Wahid al Nur. An agreement was reached between the transitional government and the SPLM-North al-Hilu rebel faction on 3 September 2020 in Addis Ababa to separate religion and state and not discriminate against anyone's ethnicity in order to secure the equal treatment of all citizens of Sudan. The declaration of principles stated that 'Sudan is a multi-racial, multi-ethnic, multi-religious and multi-cultural society. Full recognition and accommodation of these diversities must be affirmed. (...) The state shall not establish an official religion. No citizen shall be discriminated against based on their religion.'

On 3 October 2020, another peace deal was signed by the SRF, SPLM–N led by Malik Agar, SLM led by Minni Minnawi and the Sudanese government, with the absence of both al Nur and al-Hilu.

== Aftermath ==
On 28 March 2021, Al-Hilu signed a peace agreement with the Sudanese government in Juba, South Sudan, to establish of a civil, democratic federal state, which would guarantee freedom of religion and have a single army to protect national security. Al-Nur continued to refuse to attend any peace negotiations with the government.

In 2023, Sudan descended into a new civil war, fought between the SAF and the Rapid Support Forces. Part of the SPLM-N, namely the Agar faction, sided with the SAF in this conflict. In contrast, the SPLM-N's al-Hilu faction used the chaos to restart the insurgency and fought both the SAF as well as the RSF. The SPLM-N (al-Hilu faction) managed to capture substantial territory in South Kordofan, and besieged Kadugli. The renewed fighting also caused ethnic conflicts stemming from the 2011–2020 rebellion to restart, as pro-SPLM-N Nuba militias and the Hawazma ethnic militia (formerly part of the pro-SAF Popular Defence Forces) once again attacked each other.

== Human rights ==
=== Ahmed Haron ===
Sometime during March an undated video emerged of the Governor of South Kordofan Ahmed Haroun telling Sudanese soldiers: "You must hand over the place clean. Rub it, crush it and sweep it. Don't bring them [Rebels] back alive. We have no space for them". An army commander standing near Haroun then says: "Don't bring them back, eat them alive" amid laughter by the group in the video. Haroun follows with "Don't create an administrative burden for us [by bringing back prisoners alive]".

The United Nations High Commissioner for Human Rights Navi Pillay warned that the comments by the Governor could amount to "violations of human rights and international humanitarian law in South Kordofan and Blue Nile states". She followed with "Such comments are extremely worrying in this context and could amount to incitement.".

The Sudanese Government has since claimed that Mr. Haroun, who has already been indicted for war crimes and crimes against humanity by the International Criminal Court (ICC) for his alleged role in the previous conflict in Darfur, was simply trying to boost the soldiers' morale. Mr Haron however, has called the video a fabrication, accusing al-Jazeera of editing the video to distort what he had said and vowed to sue the news channel.

Ms. Pillay said that witnesses who have visited the Nuba mountain region, mainly inhabited by the Nuba people and located in Southern Kordofan, have been reporting the burning of villages and killing of civilians in "an apparent scorched-earth policy." "We know very little about the scale of the military operation in Southern Kordofan, as we have been denied access to the area," she said. "But as far back as August last year, we found that human rights violations that could amount to crimes against humanity or war crimes have taken place in Southern Kordofan.".

=== Emigration ===
Following what Yasir Arman, leader of SPLA-N and the UN have described as a "scorched earth policy" more than 105,000 Sudanese refugees from the states of Southern Kordofan and Blue Nile have sought refuge in South Sudan. An additional 30,000 refugees fled Blue Nile into nearby Ethiopia.

The Office of the United Nations High Commissioner for Refugees (UNHCR) and its partners started providing basic assistance to more than 16,000 refugees who settled in Yida, South Sudan, after fleeing violence in the Nuba Mountains region, located in Sudan's Southern Kordofan state. Another 2,300 refugees have so far moved southwards to safer sites in Nyeel and Pariang to another UNHCR camps. Meanwhile, in South Sudan's Upper Nile state, where an influx of refugees from Sudan's Blue Nile state is continuing, relocation from border zones has been ongoing. About 86,000 Sudanese refugees fleeing attacks in Blue Nile state have relocated to the safety of formal sites in Doro and Jammam, Ms. Fleming said.

However, since the beginning of Sudanese border conflict in 2012 the UNHCR now considers the Yida refugee settlement as not safe for long-term stay due to its proximity to the volatile border zone. South Sudan authorities at central and local level are also urging refugee leaders to relocate, in line with the provisions of the 1969 OAU (now AU) Convention on Refugees. Article 2 stipulates that "for reasons of security, countries of asylum shall, as far as possible, settle refugees at a reasonable distance from the frontier of their country of origin".

== Attempts at resolution ==
=== August 2011 ceasefire ===
On 23 August 2011, President Omar al-Bashir announced a two-week unilateral ceasefire in the conflict while on a surprise visit to South Kordofan state. He said the government would continue to embargo foreign aid directed toward South Kordofan, and the only humanitarian access would be through the Sudanese Red Crescent. He said that after the two-week ceasefire, "the situation will be assessed on the ground".

== International reactions ==
=== Supranational organisations ===
- African Union – On 29 June, AU Commission Chairperson Jean Ping called on both sides in South Kordofan "to immediately cease hostilities, to allow the access of humanitarian aid and the return of displaced people" and hailed a ceasefire agreement as "decisive" and "a good omen". The AU, led first by former South African President Thabo Mbeki and then by Ethiopian Prime Minister Meles Zenawi, attempted to mediate a solution to growing tensions in Blue Nile, but it failed to prevent the spread of the conflict.
- United Nations – The United Nations Security Council voted on 3 June to demand that Sudan and Southern Sudan withdraw troops from the Abyei Area. Secretary-General Ban Ki-moon voiced support for efforts to end the conflict in late June 2011, saying on 29 June that Sudan and the SPLM-N must work quickly for a cessation of hostilities. A United Nations Mission in the Sudan human rights investigation in June and early July, prior to the mission's disbandment, found that "condemnation is insufficient" for the atrocities it said had been committed by the Sudanese military during the fighting, including attacks on UNMIS offices and personnel, though it also criticised the SPLM for violations. In August, the United States attempted to persuade the Security Council to pass a resolution condemning the violence, but it was blocked by Sudanese allies Russia and China. United Nations High Commissioner for Refugees António Guterres responded to the outbreak of violence in Blue Nile in September by saying both sides must work to prevent "yet one more refugee crisis" in the region. Ban also expressed concern over the violence.

=== Countries ===
- South Sudan – On 22 May, South Sudan denounced the seizure of Abyei as an "act of war". Information Minister Barnaba Marial Benjamin denied claims by the Sudanese government that Juba was offering material support to SPLM-N fighters in the North on 31 August and asserted that the SPLM had severed all ties with the SPLM-N after independence. He expressed concern at the violence in Blue Nile on 2 September and called on the Sudanese government to launch a full investigation and endeavour to prevent the violence from spreading.
- United States – Having condemned the military takeover of Abyei on 21 March, on 22 July, Ambassador to the United Nations Susan Rice accused the Sudanese military of perpetrating human rights violations in South Kordofan. Princeton Lyman, the US special envoy to Sudan, said on 10 August that Washington was concerned that fighting could spread to and involve newly independent South Sudan.
- France – On 22 May 2011, France condemned the military takeover and demanded a Sudanese withdrawal from Abyei. France argued that Sudan's actions constituted a violation of 2005 peace agreement and of the Kadugli Accord signed in January, and that the conflict should be mediated by the African Union.
- Canada – On 23 May 2011, the Canada's Foreign Affairs Minister, John Baird, condemned the "recent upsurge of violence in Abyei". Canada called for an immediate withdrawal by both sides, respect for human rights and avoidance of further escalation. Baird added that he hoped "Northern and Southern Sudan" would both "embrace the opportunity afforded by the African Union High-Level Implementation Panel to resolve the status of Abyei and other outstanding issues".
- United Kingdom – On 22 May 2011, Foreign Secretary William Hague condemned the violence, saying that the actions were "clear violations of the CPA and cannot be justified" and calling for "all sides to cease hostilities immediately. All unauthorised forces should be withdrawn from the entire area of Abyei in accordance with past agreements by the parties."

=== NGOs ===
Groups such as Human Rights Watch and Amnesty International have expressed concern about the humanitarian situation.

In May 2012, researchers from the Humanitarian Policy Group at the Overseas Development Institute highlighted that the situation in South Kordofan was approaching crisis levels and called for stronger leadership and engagement from humanitarian actors, as well as a redoubling of diplomatic efforts to restart political dialogue in the hope of securing a lasting and peaceful resolution.

== See also ==
- 2011–2013 Sudanese protests
- Ethnic violence in South Sudan
- Second Sudanese Civil War
- War in Darfur
