= New Dawn Charter =

Political agreement between Sudanese opposition groups

The New Dawn Charter (Arabic: الفجر الجديد الميثاق, al-Fajar al-Jadeed al-Meethaq) is an agreement between various opposition groups in Sudan, signed on January 5, 2013. The document outlines a blueprint for building an inclusive government with democratic legitimacy in Khartoum and calls for separation of religion and state and full equality of all citizens regardless of religion.

Signatories of the Charter include among others the Justice and Equality Movement, Sudan Revolutionary Front, the National Consensus Force, Sudanese youth groups such as Girifna and Change Now, and women's groups.

The main principles and objectives of the document include:

- Recognizing Sudan is a multiethnic, multicultural, and multi-lingual country of many religions
- Advocating for a pluralistic federal democracy, based on equality between citizens and the assurance that the people of Sudan are the source of power
- Separation of church and state
- Abiding by international standards for human rights
- Ensuring accountability for those who have committed crimes during the Bashir regime
- Establishing a state based upon a democratic constitution, justice, and social welfare
- Distribution of power and wealth being based on the criterion of population numbers of the different regions, with wartime damage reparations taken into account.
- Assuring state institutions are neutral and not dominated by any particular ethnic group or tribe
- A judicial system, civil service, media, and higher education institutions which are independent and professional national institutions
- Promoting regional and international stability
- Recognizing the necessity of women's rights
- Recognizing the necessity of basic rights and freedoms
- Eliminating the use of force in the domestic political process
