= Keren Keren =

Town in Sudan

- Location in Sudan (Blue Nile State highlighted)
- Coordinates: 10°30′N 34°17′E
- Country: Sudan
- State: Blue Nile State
- Control: RSF and SPLM–N

Keren Keren (Arabic: ديم منصور) is a town in the Blue Nile State, Sudan. The area has been part of the Sudan War, it has been the sight of clashes between the SPLMN(Al Hilu) and RSF against the Sudanese Armed Forces.
