= Battle of Kurmuk =

2026 battle in Sudan

- Part of the Sudanese civil war
Date	24 March - 22 August 2026
Location	Kurmuk, Blue Nile State
Result	First battle:SAF victory Second battle:RSF victory

Belligerents
Sudanese Government; Sudanese Armed Forces; Central Reserve Forces; SLM (Minnawi); Darfur Joint Protection Force; Desert Axis Command	(Sudan) Government of Peace and Unity (from April 2025); Rapid Support Forces

Strength
Unknown	Unknown

The Battle of Kurmuk was the battle for the strategic town of Kurmuk. The town is taken by the Rapid Support Forces (RSF). The battle ended with the Rapid Support Forces recapturing the third biggest settlement in Blue Nile State which had been occupied since August 2026

== Background ==
Historically, Kurmuk was a major battlefield for 22 years. The town is strategically located near the border with Ethiopia. This location trade routes between South Sudan and Ethipotoa. In 2011, the Sudanese armed forces captured the town from SPLM-North rebels.

== Battle ==
In February 2026, the Sudanese army evacuated hundreds of civilians from the town.

In March 2026, the Rapid Support Forces captured the town of Kurmuk. On 24 March, the Sudan Founding Alliance, also known as TASIS, announced that its forces had taken control.

By the summer a counteroffensive was launched. On 3 July 2026, the Sudanese Armed Forces aimed to retake the city.

In July 2026, there was heavy fighting against RSF and SPLM-N forces. In August 2026, the town was recaptured.

Subsequently, the RSF launched a counter-offensive and recaptured the city.
