= Baldago =

Locality in Blue Nile State, Sudan

- Country: Sudan
- State: Blue Nile State

Government
  - Type: town
- Time zone: UTC+2 (CAT)

Baldago is a town in Blue Nile State, Sudan.

== History ==
On 25 June 2025, the Sudanese Armed Forces (SAF) claimed to have retaken the town from the Rapid Support Forces (RSF) and the SPLM-N (al-Hilu).
