= Ibrahim Balandiya =

Sudanese politician

Ibrahim Mohammed Balandiya was a Sudanese politician in the National Congress Party. He served as the Parliament speaker in the state of Kurdufan and later as speaker of the South Kurdufan legislative council. He was the most senior official to be killed in the Sudanese internal conflict as of July 2012.

== Death ==
A convoy belonging to the Sudanese government was ambushed on 6 July 2012. Balandiya was killed alongside seven others, including another state official, Faisal Bashir, the head of the strategic planning committee for South Kurdufan. The state news agency of Sudan, SUNA, stated that the SPLM-N rebel group was responsible, and said that the attack took place between two villages in the region. The SPLM-N denied the accusation. The attack occurred dozens of kilometers away from the closest SPLM-N area of operations at the time. There are persistent local rumours that Balandiya, a Nuba, was killed on the orders of Ahmed Haroun, with whom he was in open disagreement.
