= Jalila Khamis Koko =

Sudanese teacher and human rights activist

Jalila Khamis Koko (also Jalila Khamis Kuku) is a Sudanese teacher and activist. In March 2012, she was detained by the Sudanese National Intelligence and Security Service (NISS) and accused of treason. After a 10-month detainment, she was released in January 2013. In December 2013, Khamis was awarded the Delegation of the European Union to Sudan's "Heroes for Human Rights Award 2013".

== Personal life ==
Jalila Khamis was born around 1968 in South Kordofan the Nuba Mountain region of Sudan and is of Nubian ethnicity. Since the mid-1980s, except for a brief six-year period between 2005 and 2011, conflict has plagued the area of the Nuba Mountains. Less well-known than Darfur, partly due to the remoteness of the region and difficulty in accessing it, the conflict is Africa's longest running war.

She resides with her husband and five children, in Khartoum, where she has been a school teacher for many years. She is member of the outlawed opposition party, Sudan People's Liberation Movement-North, and active in NGOs for women's rights in Sudan.

== Activism ==
When the Comprehensive Peace Agreement was drafted in 2005 to end the 25-year conflict in her homeland, Khamis returned to visit her native village, Katcha, in the Buram locality. Concerned because the local children had to travel long distances to school, she obtained the necessary documents for opening a village school. Khamis then organized donations for construction and supplies and was successful in recruiting teachers from Khartoum.

In 2011, when fighting broke out again in the Nuba Mountains, women's groups and civilians became targets of the conflict. Tens of thousand of refugees fled the area for Khartoum and South Sudan. Khamis turned her home in Khartoum into a temporary safe house for those fleeing the conflict and called attention to the humanitarian crisis caused by what she called the 'premeditated military strategy to ethnically cleanse the Nuba people.'

In a plea for peace and an end to fighting, Khamis Koko's video criticizing the treatment of the Nuba people by Sudanese President Omar al-Bashir was posted on YouTube and led to her arrest. She was accused of treason and denied access to her attorneys, but women's organizations rallied to reach the international media through a blog campaign, social media efforts, and a silent protest organized by GIRIFNA—Sudanese Non-Violent Resistance Movement. The GIRIFNA demand for justice was held at the Omdurman federal women’s prison, where Khamis was being held. In January, 2013, she was released and the court acknowledged there was "no basis for the charges against her". Khamis was convicted of the sole charge of "spreading false news" and sentenced to time served.

== Legacy ==
Kahmis' story spawned reports in the region focusing on violence against women and the Egyptian media producer OnTV ran an entire segment on the Sudanese humanitarian crisis. Activists and youth movement leaders recognized the impact that a digital campaign could have, in spite of warnings from lawyers that media attention would damage the case.
