= Al-Mazmum =

Village in Sudan

Coordinates: 12°16′24″N 33°32′24″E

Al-Mazmum Mazmum, El Mazmum, Mazmoum, Al-Mazmoum
- Village
- Interactive map of Al-Mazmum
- Country: Sudan
- State: Sennar

Al-Mazmum is a village in Sennar State in Sudan. In 1973, it was described as a large village.

In 2002, Sudan accounted for more 70% of the global cases of Guinea worm disease and most of the indigenous cases of the disease in Sudan originated in Al Mazmoum. In 2007, residents protested a lack of basic services and called for the merger of the Al-Dali, Al Mazmum and Al-Tadamoun areas. In 2016, violent clashes took place between nomads returning from South Sudan and farmers in the area.

A hill in the area is known as Jebel Mazmum.
