= Baw District =

Baw
- District
- Country: Sudan
- State: Blue Nile

Baw is a district of Blue Nile state, Sudan.
