= Yasir Arman =

Sudanese politician (born 1952)

- ياسر عرمان
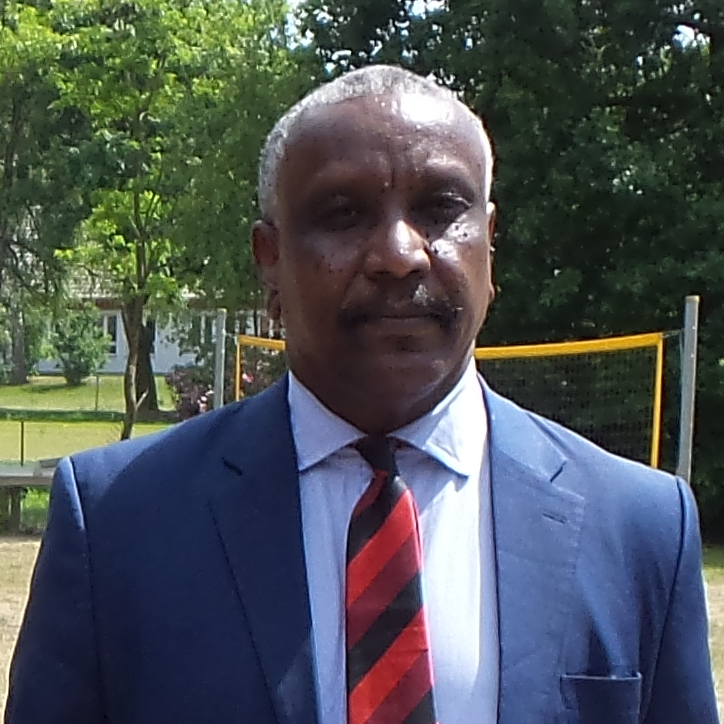

Secretary General of the Sudan People's Liberation Movement-North
- In office 2011–2017
- Succeeded by: Party split

Personal details
- Born: October 5, 1962 (age 64) Tabat City, Al-Jazira, Sudan
- Party: Sudanese Communist Party (until 1987); SPLM (1987–2011); SPLM–N (2011–2017); SPLM–N (Agar) (2017–2022); SPLM–RDC (2022–present)

Yasir Said Arman (Arabic: ياسر سعيد عرمان; born October 5, 1962) is a Sudanese politician and activist. He was the Sudan People's Liberation Movement (SPLM)'s deputy secretary-general for the northern sector and its spokesman. Initially he was presented as the SPLM candidate for the April 2010 presidential election, but the party later chose to boycott the presidential election. After South Sudan's independence on July 9, 2011, and the creation of a separate SPLM party in the Republic of the Sudan (North Sudan), Arman later served as the secretary general of the SPLM-N.

Arman is one of the leaders who helped draft and signed the Naivasha agreement of the Comprehensive Peace Agreement that ended the war between the north and south of Sudan in 2005. He was the head of the SPLM quota for the parliamentary faction.

== Childhood and youth ==
Yasir Arman belongs to the Ja'alin, an Arab tribe indigenous to Northern Sudan; he was born in Tabat City in the state of Al Jazirah. He joined the Sudanese Communist Party as a student in the mid-seventies.

Arman was accused of involvement in the deaths of two pro-Islamist students at the Khartoum branch of Cairo University (now Al-Neelain University), but was subsequently acquitted of the charges in court.

== Political activism ==
Arman left the Sudanese Communist Party and joined the SPLM in 1987. He became very close to the former leader John Garang. Arman was appointed as a military leader and spokesman.

Yasir Arman was arrested with other leaders in December 2009 after attempting to conduct a demonstration in Khartoum to protest against legislation passed in the parliament of Sudan.

After the secession of South Sudan, Arman remained in the SPLM–N group in Sudan. In mid-2017, following a split of the SPLM–N into SPLM–N (al-Hilu) and SPLM–N (Agar) over disagreements on secularization, Arman joined the SPLM–N (Agar) and became its deputy chair. In August 2022, Arman split "amicably" from the group in August 2022 following disagreements with Agar over the October 2021 coup, forming his own faction known as the Sudan People's Liberation Movement - Revolutionary Democratic Current (SPLM–RDC).

== Personal life ==
Yasir Arman is married to a daughter of Sultan Deng Majok, one of the sultans of South Sudan, and has four children.

== See also ==
- Comprehensive Peace Agreement
- John Garang
- Salva Kiir
