= Mabsouta =

Town in South Kordofan, Sudan

- Country: Sudan
- State: South Kordofan

Government
  - Type: town
- Time zone: UTC+2 (CAT)

Mabsouta is a town in South Kordofan, Sudan.

== History ==
On 2 December 2025, the Sudanese Armed Forces (SAF) retook the town from the SPLM-N (al-Hilu), which had occupied the area since 2011.
