= Battle of Shererina =

2026 battle in the Ethiopian civil conflict

- Part of Ethiopian civil conflict
Date	31 July – 1 August, 2026
Location	Shererina, Tigray Region, Ethiopia
Result	Ethiopian victory

Belligerents
Tigray People's Liberation Front; Sudan (alleged by Ethiopia)	Ethiopia

Units involved
Tigray Defense Forces	Ethiopian National Defense Force

The Battle of Shererina occurred in late July and early August 2026, when the Tigray People's Liberation Front invaded Ethiopia from Sudan.

== Battle ==
The clashes occurred at Shererina, near Sheraro, and also to the town of Humera. Ethiopian federal forces repelled the attack the next day and claimed the area was safe. On the attack day, refugee camps in Sudan were hit by Ethiopian artillery fire. The TPLF announced that the conflict de-escalated after hundreds of civilian refugees flee the border fearing another war.
