= New Sudan (political philosophy) =

Proposal for restructuring Sudan

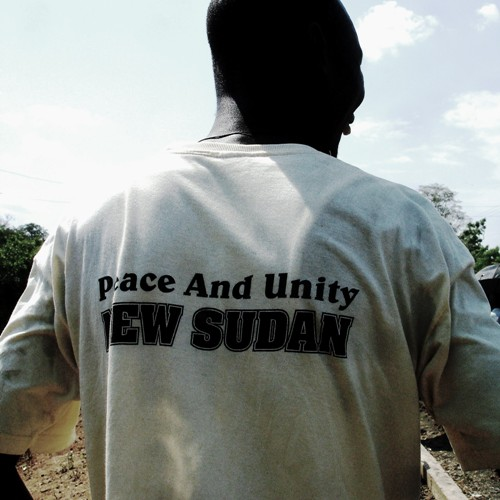
A Southern Sudanese supporter of Garang's "New Sudan" in 2008

New Sudan (Arabic: السُّودَانُ الْجَدِيدُ, romanized: Āl-Südān(u) āl-Jadīd(u)) is a concept proposed by the Sudan People's Liberation Movement and the Sudan People's Liberation Movement–North, and its constituent paramilitary forces during the Second Sudanese Civil War. The original SPLM Manifesto outlined New Sudan as a proposed united and secular Sudanese state. The vision of 'New Sudan' was developed by John Garang, who advocated the 'New Sudan' as a democratic and pluralistic state.

The 1994 National Convention of New Sudan (organized by SPLA/M) redefined 'New Sudan' as a system of governance for the regions under SPLM control. After John Garang's death in 2005 and the independence of South Sudan in 2011, and the resulting decreased ethnic plurality, the New Sudan discourse became a less prominent feature in Sudanese politics.

== New Sudan during the Sudanese civil war (2023–present) ==
During the course of the ongoing Sudanese civil war, and as a result of its political divisiveness, the concept of New Sudan has become a substantial and significant element of the political philosophy of the SPLM-North, a reconstituted faction of the SPLM.

In June 2024 Nicholas Casey of the New York Times was allowed in the Nuba Mountains stronghold of the Sudan People's Liberation Movement-North faction led by Abdel Aziz al-Hilu. Casey reported that civil war had distracted the SAF from attacking the SPLM-N and allowed the SPLM-N to go on the offensive, capturing territory "at a steady pace". It calls the territory it controls "New Sudan". Its capital is Kauda, a farming town, where the rebel government issues driver’s licenses and birth certificates, and has a court system made up of volunteer judges, "deciding everything from dowry disputes to murder cases", and schools teaching in English. Concerns of the group include the hundreds of thousands of displaced people coming into its territory from other parts of Sudan, a devastating drought, a lack of food, and government airstrikes.

Journalist Nicholas Casey describes SPLM-N (al-Hilu) as "among the few rebel groups to claim it is fighting for a Western-style democracy: It has a Constitution and calls for a secular state in Sudan".

== See also ==
- Next Sudanese general election
