= Geissan District =

Geissan
- District
- Country: Sudan
- State: Blue Nile

Geissan is a district of Blue Nile state, Sudan.
