= Qaysān =

Qaysān, Qēssan
- Village
- Location in Sudan
- Country: Sudan
- State: Blue Nile State

Qaysān or Qeissan or Qēssan is a village in Blue Nile State, south-eastern Sudan on the border with Ethiopia.
