= Blue Nile State =

State of Sudan

Blue Nile State ولاية النيل الأزرق Wilāyat an-Nīl al-Azraq
- State
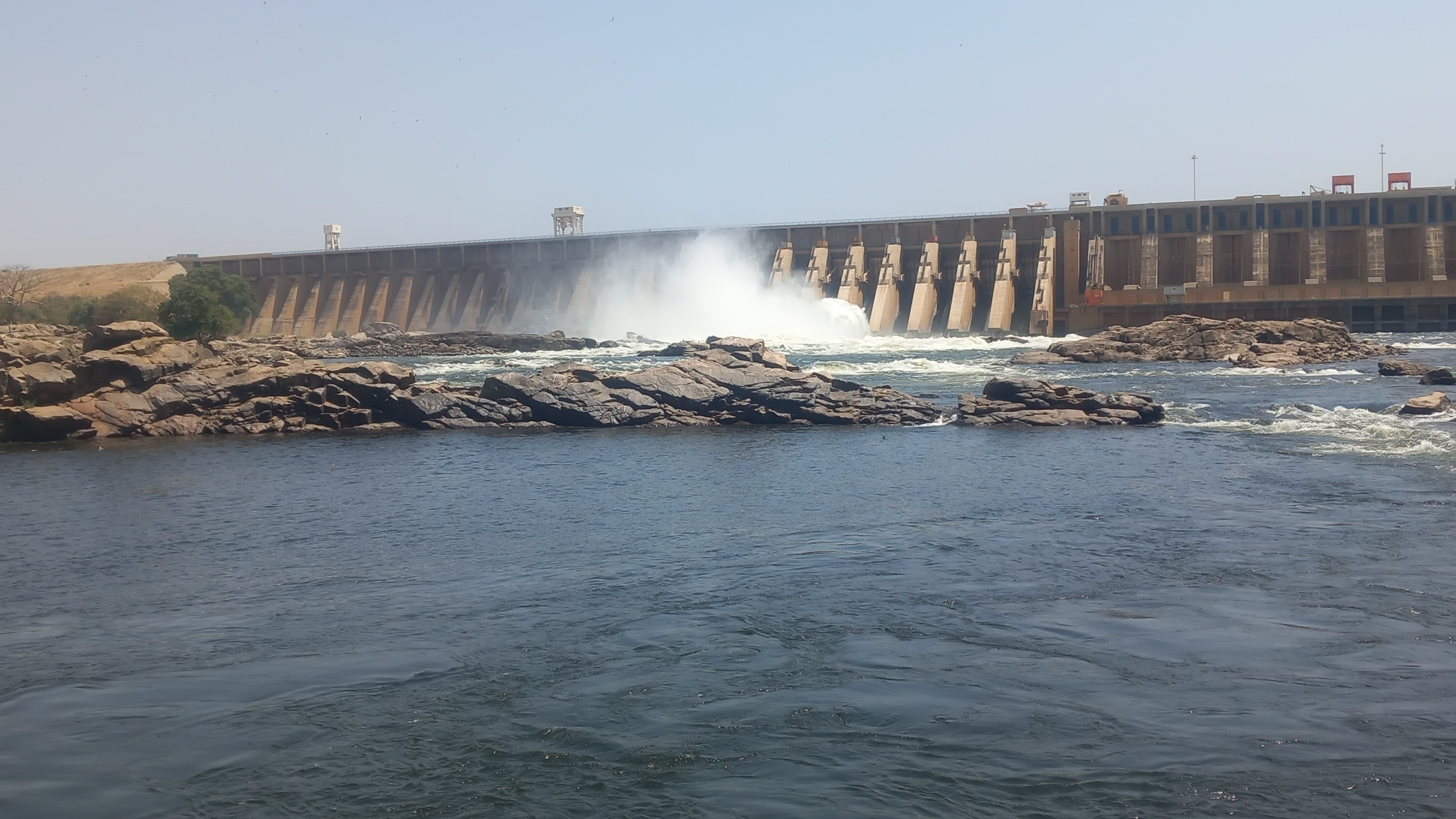
- Roseires Dam on the Blue Nile

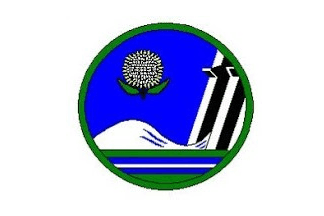
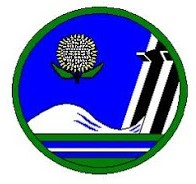
- Flag Seal

- Location in Sudan.
- Coordinates: 11°16′N 34°4′E
- Country: Sudan
- Region: Blue Nile Province
- Capital: Ad-Damazin

Government
  - Governor: Ahmed al-Omda

Area
  - Total: 45,844 km^{2} (17,700 sq mi)

Population (2018)
  - Total: 1,108,391
- Time zone: UTC+2 (CAT)
- HDI (2017): 0.416 low

Blue Nile State (Arabic: ولاية النيل الأزرق Wilāyat an-Nīl al-ʾAzraq) is one of the 18 states of the Republic of the Sudan. Established by Presidential Decree No. 3 in 1992, it is named after the Blue Nile River. The region is host to around forty different ethnic groups. Its economic activity is based on agriculture and livestock as well as mineral exploitation. It borders Ethiopia to the east, South Sudan to the west, and Sennar to the north.

== History ==
In 2011, residents of Blue Nile were scheduled to hold ill-defined "popular consultations" to determine the constitutional future of the state, per the Comprehensive Peace Agreement. Instead, a dispute over the rightful government of the state, and the determination of Omar al-Bashir to eradicate the Sudan People's Liberation Movement–North, led to a renewed nine-year conflict between government forces and the Sudan Revolutionary Front as well as contributing to a refugee crisis. The conflict finally came to an end in 2020 after a peace agreement was signed and the government to not discriminate based on ethnicity or religion.

Further clashes in the state broke out in 2022 between the Hausa people and Funj and Berta peoples over land disputes which led to the deaths of hundreds of civilians. On 5 August 2024, the RSF launched an incursion into the state and continues to control northwestern parts of the state. On 5 March 2025, SAF launched a counteroffensive on the rest of RSF controlled territory in Sennar, and took full control over territories, including Mazmoum.

In 2026, conflict renewed as the RSF and SPLM-N launched an offensive from the Ethiopian border, capturing Kurmuk and the southern areas of the state.

== Administration ==
Districts of Blue Nile

The State is sub-divided into five districts (with 2006 Census populations shown hereafter):

1. Ad Damazin District (212,712)
2. Al Roseires District (215,857)
3. Geissan District (87,809)
4. Baw District (127,251)
5. Al Kurumik District (110,815)

== State Governors ==
- Feb 1994 – Dec 1997 : Abdalla Abu-Fatma Abdalla
- Dec 1997 – Jan 2000 : Abd ar-Rahman Abu Madyan
- Jan 2000 – Feb 2001 : Al-Hadi Bashra
- Feb 2001 – 2003 : Hassan Hamadayn Suleiman (1st time)
- 2003 – 2004?: Abdallah Uthman al-Haj
- 2004 – 2005: Hassan Hamadayn Suleiman (2nd time)
- Sep 2005 – Jul 2007 : Abdel Rahman Mohamed Abu Madien
- Jul 2007 – 20 Sep 2011 : Malik Agar Eyre
- Sep 2011 – Apr 2013 : Yahya Mohamed Khair (1st time)
- 1 Apr 2013 – May 2018 : Hussein Yassin Hamad
- 14 May 2018 – Feb 2019 : Khalid Hussein Mohamed Omer
- 24 Feb 2019 – Apr 2019 : Yahya Mohamed Khair (2nd time)
- Apr 2019 - 2020 : Ahmed Abdul-Rahim Shukratall
- 22 Jul 2020 - 27 Dec 2020 : Abdul Rahman Mohammed Nour al-Daiem
- Dec 2020 - 13 Jun 2021 : Jamal Abdel Hadi
- 13 Jun 2021 - Incumbent : Ahmed al-Omda

== Geography ==
Blue Nile state has an area of 45,844 km^{2} and an estimated population of 1,193,293. The Central Bureau of Statistics quoted the population at 832,112 in the 2006 census. Ad-Damazin is the capital of the state. The state of Blue Nile is home to the Roseires Dam, the main source of hydroelectric power in Sudan until the completion of the Merowe Dam in 2010.

== Settlements ==
- Ad-Damazin
- Baldago
- Bashir Nuqu
- Deim Mansour
- Er Roseires
- Khor al-Budi
- Kurmuk
- Qaysān, Abdullah Qeissan
- Qaysān, Qēssan
- Wad el-Mahi

== Languages ==
The following languages are spoken in Blue Nile state according to Ethnologue.

- Berta language
- Gumuz language
- Hausa language
- Eastern Jebel languages
  - Gaam language
  - Aka language
  - Kelo language
  - Molo language
- Nilotic languages
  - Burun language
  - Jumjum language (speakers based in South Sudan)
- Omotic languages
  - Ganza language
- Koman languages
  - Komo language
  - Gule language
  - Uduk language
- Other languages
  - Fulfulde language
  - Songhay language
