= Kauda, Sudan =

Kauda كاودا
- Location within Sudan
- Coordinates: 11°04′N 30°33′E
- Country: De Jure: Sudan; De facto: New Sudan
- State: South Kordofan
- Control: SPLM-North (al-Hilu)

Government
  - Type: Administrative Unit

Population (2005)
  - Total: 55,000

Kauda (Arabic: كاودا) is a town in southern Sudan, located in the South Kordofan state which currently serves as headquarters of rebels from the Sudan People's Liberation Movement–North (al-Hilu) group.

== History ==
On 19 December 2013, the Sudanese army bombed Kauda, killing one person and wounding another.

In 2020, Sudanese Prime Minister Abdallah Hamdok visited Kauda for the first time since war broke out in 2011.

As of January 2025, the town is under the control of the Sudan People's Liberation Movement–North (al-Hilu) rebel group during the Sudanese civil war (2023–present).

== Religion ==
There is a mosque in the town. A Catholic community also exists.
