= Abdelaziz al-Hilu =

Sudanese politician and insurgent (born 1954)

Commander Abdelaziz al-Hilu
- عبد العزيز الحلو

Vice-President of the Presidency of the Presidential Council of the Government of Peace and Unity
- Incumbent
- Assumed office 26 July 2025
- President: Hemedti
- Prime Minister: Mohammed Hassan al-Ta'ishi
- Preceded by: Office established

Leader of New Sudan
- In office 2017
- Preceded by: Malik Agar
- Succeeded by: Office abolished

Personal details
- Born: 7 July 1954 (age 72) Al-Faydh Umm Abdullah, Anglo-Egyptian Sudan

Military service
- Allegiance: SPLM–N (al-Hilu)
- Battles/wars: Second Sudanese Civil War; Sudanese conflict in South Kordofan and Blue Nile; Sudanese civil war (2023–present)

Abdelaziz Adam al-Hilu (Note: Arabic: عبد العزيز الحلو) (born 7 July 1954) is a Sudanese politician who has been serving as the vice chairman of the Government of Peace and Unity since 2025. He is also the leader of the Sudan People's Liberation Movement-North (al-Hilu).

== Biography ==
Al-Hilu was born in Al-Faydh Umm Abdullah, South Kordofan. He was born, raised and educated in the Nuba Mountains. He studied economics at the University of Khartoum, and graduated in 1979.

He is considered one of the most successful SPLA/M commanders in the history of the SPLA and worked with Sudanese revolutionary leader John Garang with the stated goal of creating a Sudan that is democratic, fair and free to all Sudanese.

In 2011 he lost the election for governor of South Kordofan to Ahmed Haroun in a poll rejected by the SPLA as rigged. He had been fighting the Sudanese Armed Forces in the Second Sudanese Civil War and the South Kordofan conflict.

In mid-2017, the SPLM–N split into two factions, the SPLM–N (al-Hilu) and SPLM–N (Agar), over disagreements on secularization. Following the Sudanese revolution, he declared a temporary unilateral ceasefire "to give the ongoing peace talks an opportunity for success", which was later further extended, during which he reached an agreement with the transitional government to separate religion and state and not discriminate against anyone's ethnicity on 3 September 2020. He has also called to remove former president Omar al-Bashir's militias and to reorganize the Sudanese military, in addition to self-determination in areas controlled by his faction.

On 28 March 2021, al-Hilu signed a peace agreement with the Sudanese government in Juba, South Sudan, in which it would pave the path to establish a civil, democratic federal state in Sudan, in addition to guaranteeing freedom of religion and having a single army to protect national security.

During the civil war in Sudan which began in 2023, al-Hilu was hesitant to join the Tagadum coalition, insisting on secular governance as a foundation for Sudan's unity and stability. He also supported initiatives to end conflict but emphasized addressing Sudan's deep-rooted issues. His forces in South Kordofan and Blue Nile prioritized defending citizens and ensuring aid reached civilians. In February 2025, al-Hilu supported the Rapid Support Forces (RSF)'s attempt to form a parallel government in Nairobi, Kenya. In July 2025, he was proclaimed the deputy leader of a governing alliance headed by the RSF's leader Hemedti.
