= Kurmuk =

Kurmuk الكرمك
- Town
- Location in Sudan
- Coordinates: 10°33′23″N 34°17′3″E
- Country: Sudan
- State: Blue Nile

Population (2006)
  - Total: 110,815

Kurmuk (Arabic: الكرمك) is a town in south-eastern Sudan near the border with Ethiopia. Kurmuk is inhabited by the Uduk and Berta peoples.

Kurmuk is the administrative center for most of Gindi District, Kolnugura district, Borfa District, Jammus Omm District, Chali District, Penawayu District, Bee District, Balila District and Yabus who find better medical services in Kurmuk. Lt. General and Governor Malik Agar currently names Kurmuk the capital city of Southern Blue Nile. Malik Agar is the former SPLM commander who is currently the governor of Blue Nile state.

The population of Kurmuk includes a number of Muslim and Christian Communities. Many of the Uduk people have converted to Christianity. Other ethnic groups include the Igansina, Jumum and Mufuwu in Kurmuk.

== History ==
In January 1932, Egyptian and Ethiopian officials met at Kurmuk to resolve problems caused by Ethiopian slavers preying on villages in Sudan.

Due to the numerous ethnic groups living in and around Kurmuk, many of whom feel marginalized by the Islamic tendencies of the central government, the city has been a political hotspot since rebellion against the Islamic regime in 1983.

Due to lack of education in Kurmuk County particularly, the Minister/Advisory of the Governor Major General Steven Amath Dicko convened with his Kurmukians in November 2008 in an attempt to tax citizens as means to generate revenues to bring primary schools and secondary educations to every district of the Kwanim Pa. To alleviate this deficiency, United States Agency for International Development built the Granville-Abbas Girls' Secondary School in Kurmuk, which was opened on 8 March 2010. The school was named for an American diplomat and his Sudanese colleague who were both assassinated in Khartoum on 1 January 2008.

The RSF and SPLM-N (al-Hilu) took over the town amid the Blue Nile campaign on 24 March 2026, near the Ethiopian border in Blue Nile State. The offensive displaced over 73,000 people. The Sudanese Armed Forces launched an offensive on 3 July 2026 to retake the city.

== Climate ==
Kurmuk has a tropical savanna climate (Köppen climate classification Aw) with average rainfall reaches 933 mm

Climate data for Al Kurmuk
Month	Jan	Feb	Mar	Apr	May	Jun	Jul	Aug	Sep	Oct	Nov	Dec	Year
Mean daily maximum °C (°F)	36.5 (97.7)	37.7 (99.9)	38.9 (102.0)	38.2 (100.8)	33.8 (92.8)	31.5 (88.7)	28.7 (83.7)	29.7 (85.5)	31.1 (88.0)	32.8 (91.0)	35.0 (95.0)	36.7 (98.1)	34.2 (93.6)
Daily mean °C (°F)	28.6 (83.5)	29.7 (85.5)	30.9 (87.6)	30.6 (87.1)	27.8 (82.0)	26.1 (79.0)	24.5 (76.1)	24.9 (76.8)	25.5 (77.9)	26.2 (79.2)	27.0 (80.6)	28.2 (82.8)	27.5 (81.5)
Mean daily minimum °C (°F)	20.8 (69.4)	21.7 (71.1)	22.9 (73.2)	23.0 (73.4)	21.9 (71.4)	20.7 (69.3)	20.4 (68.7)	20.1 (68.2)	19.9 (67.8)	19.7 (67.5)	19.1 (66.4)	19.7 (67.5)	20.8 (69.5)
Average precipitation mm (inches)	0 (0)	1 (0.0)	8 (0.3)	34 (1.3)	98 (3.9)	143 (5.6)	172 (6.8)	210 (8.3)	145 (5.7)	100 (3.9)	21 (0.8)	1 (0.0)	933 (36.6)
Source: Climate data.org

== See also ==
- List of cities in Sudan
