= Sudan People's Liberation Movement–North =

Political party and militant organisation in Sudan

Sudan People's Liberation Movement–North الحَرَكَةْ الشَّعْبِيَّةْ لِتَحْرَيرْ السُّودَانْ الشَّمَالْ
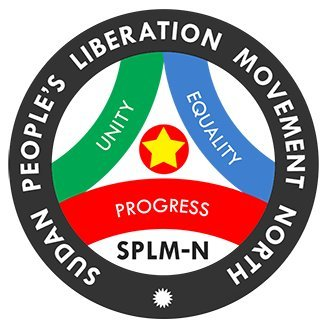
- Leaders: Abdelaziz al-Hilu – SPLM-N (al-Hilu); Malik Agar – SPLM-N (Agar)
- Founded: 2011; 15 years ago
- Split from: Sudan People's Liberation Movement
- Ideology: New Sudan; Constitutionalism; Democracy; Secularism; Anti-racism
- National affiliation: Sudan Revolutionary Front
- National Assembly: 0 / 426

Party flag

The Sudan People's Liberation Movement–North (SPLM–N) (Note: Arabic: الحَرَكَةْ الشَّعْبِيَّةْ لِتَحْرَيرْ السُّودَانْ الشَّمَالْ, romanized: al-Ḥarakat ash-Shaʿbiyya li-Taḥrīr as-Sudān ash-Shamāl) is a political party and militant organization in Sudan based in the states of Blue Nile and South Kordofan. The group's armed forces are the Sudan People's Liberation Army–North (SPLA–N).

In 2011, when South Sudan broke away from Sudan to form a new country, most of the Sudan People's Liberation Movement (SPLM) and Army (SPLA) left with it, leaving units remaining across the border in Sudan to form the SPLA–N.

In 2017, the SPLA–N split into two factions, the SPLA–N (al-Hilu) and SPLA–N (Agar), both of whom have engaged in fighting each other and against the government of Sudan, from approximately 2017–2019. In the wake of the ongoing Sudanese civil war, the al-Hilu faction is fighting against Sudanese Armed Forces (SAF) and administers a quasi-state in southern Sudan called "New Sudan". On the other hand, the Agar faction was appointed into the military-run government and is engaged in fighting the SAF-opposed Rapid Support Forces (RSF).

== History ==
=== Creation ===
The SPLM–N was founded by the organizations of the predominantly South Sudanese Sudan People's Liberation Movement/Army that remained in Sudan following the South Sudanese vote for independence in 2011. Despite the Comprehensive Peace Agreement, a low-level conflict continued in Republic of Sudan. Conflict with the central authorities led President Omar al-Bashir to ban the party. South Sudan is also said to support SPLA-N operations in Sudan, just as Sudan supports anti-government groups in South Sudan.

=== 2011 resumption of conflict ===
==== South Kordofan ====
On 19 July 2011, shortly after the independence of South Sudan/ Nuba Mountains the SPLM–N in South Kordofan and the Justice and Equality Movement of Darfur conducted a coordinated attack against the Sudanese army at Pisea, south of the state capital of Kadugli. In August, Radio Dabanga reported that the rebels were gaining ground against government forces. The conflict has led to the displacement of nearly 400,000 residents of the Nuba Mountains and surrounding areas.

==== Blue Nile ====
Disputes over the rightful government of Blue Nile State led to a resumption of violence in late August/early September 2011. In September and October the SPLA-N formed a government based in Kurmuk, which took control of large parts of the state. The conflict in the Blue Nile has raised fears of a new refugee crisis and a return to civil war.

In September 2012, Amnesty International reported that SPLM–N teacher and activist Jalila Khamis Koko was summoned by a prosecutor for six charges, primarily relating to state security. The organization stated that she appeared to be "held solely for her humanitarian work and for the peaceful expression of her views", and designated her a prisoner of conscience. She was released after a court hearing on 20 January 2013.

=== 2017 split ===
In mid-2017, the SPLM–N split between a faction led by Abdelaziz al-Hilu and one led by Malik Agar. Fighting between the two factions in the Blue Nile included the killing of an SPLM–N (Agar) army major by the SPLM–N (al-Hilu). SPLM–N (Agar) secretary-general Ismail Khamis Jallab claimed that SPLM–N (al-Hilu) had refused mediation efforts.

A key factor motivating the split was that al-Hilu's group insisted on including the establishment of a secular state in negotiations with the al-Bashir government of the time, while Agar's group disagreed. In the 2019–2020 Sudanese Revolution phase of the Sudanese peace process, the SPLM–N (al-Hilu) continued to insist on secularisation of the state as a requirement for a peace deal.

=== Sudanese peace process ===
The August 2019 Draft Constitutional Declaration, signed by military and civilian representatives during the 2018–19 Sudanese Revolution, requires that a peace agreement for resolving the War in Darfur and the Sudanese conflict in South Kordofan and Blue Nile be made within the first six months of the 39-month transition period to democratic civilian government. As part of the resulting Sudanese peace process, on 18 October, after a three-hour negotiating session mediated by a South Sudanese mediation team, Amar Daldoum, on behalf of the SPLM–N (al-Hilu) and Shams al-Din Khabbashi, on behalf of the Sovereignty Council signed an agreement on political, security and humanitarian procedures. The agreement was cosigned by the chair of the mediation team, Tut Galwak. The SPLM–N (al-Hilu) and the Sovereignty Council planned to develop a Declaration of Principles to organise continuation of the peace process and to present their political vision.

On 24 January 2020, political and security agreements, constituting a framework agreement, were signed by the Sovereignty Council and Ahmed El Omda Badi on behalf of SPLM–N (Agar). The agreements give legislative autonomy to South Kordofan and Blue Nile; propose solutions for the sharing of land and other resources; and aim to unify all militias and government soldiers into a single unified Sudanese military body. On 18 August 2020, the SPLM–N and the Sudanese government signed an agreement to integrate the rebels into the army within 39 months.

The SPLM–N (Agar) and SPLM–N (al-Hilu) factions signed a comprehensive peace agreement with the Transitional Government of Sudan on 31 August 2020 and 3 September 2020, respectively, and both factions agreed to participate in the transition to democracy in Sudan through peaceful means. Under the terms of the agreement, the factions that signed would be entitled to three seats on the sovereignty council, a total of five ministers in the transitional cabinet and a quarter of seats in the transitional legislature. At a regional level, signatories would be entitled to between 30 and 40% of the seats on transitional legislatures of their home states or regions.

=== Sudanese civil war (2023–present) ===
During the Sudanese civil war, Malik Agar was appointed as deputy head of the Transitional Sovereignty Council on 19 May by de facto leader Abdel Fattah al-Burhan. He replaced General Muhammad "Hemedti" Dagalo, who launched the conflict in April as leader of the paramilitary Rapid Support Forces (RSF).

On 8 June, the SPLM–N (al-Hilu) began mobilizing around Kadugli, moving into several army camps and prompting the SAF to reinforce its positions despite an RSF blockade. This prompted fears of a new front in the conflict despite the group regularly agreeing to annual ceasefire agreements.

On 21 June, the SPLM–N (al-Hilu) broke its ceasefire agreement and attacked Sudanese army units in South Kordofan, particularly in Kadugli and in al-Dalanj, the latter coinciding with an attack by the RSF. The army claimed to have repelled the attacks, while the rebels claimed to have attacked in retaliation for the death of one of their soldiers at the hands of the SAF and vowed to free the region from "military occupation." On 25 June, the group attacked SAF positions in Kurmuk, Blue Nile State, near the border with Ethiopia.

In July, despite an appeal by South Sudanese President Salva Kiir to cease its attacks, the SPLM–N (al-Hilu) seized several army garrisons and an oil field in South Kordofan and blocked the road leading from Karkal to Kadugli. It also launched another attack in Kurmuk.

Speculation arose as to whether al-Hilu's attacks were part of an unofficial alliance between him and the RSF or an attempt to strengthen his position in future negotiations concerning his group. Civil society organizations supporting the SPLM–N claimed its operations sought to protect civilians from possible attacks by the RSF.

==== State within a state, 2024 ====
Map of Sudanese civil war (2023–present) Controlled by Sudanese Armed Forces and allies Controlled by Rapid Support Forces Controlled by SPLM–N (al-Hilu) Controlled by allied Rapid Support Forces and SPLM–N (al-Hilu) Controlled by SLM (al-Nur)

In June 2024 Nicholas Casey of The New York Times was allowed in the Nuba Mountains stronghold of the Sudan People's Liberation Movement-North led by Abdelaziz al-Hilu (SPLM–N (al-Hilu)). Casey reported that the civil war between the SAF and RSF had distracted the SAF from attacking the SPLM–N (al-Hilu) and allowed the SPLM–N to go on the offensive, capturing territory "at a steady pace". It had cut off supplies to Kadugli, the capital city of South Kordofan State, and was planning to "liberate" it along with what it believes to be substantial stores of military materiel of tanks, armored personnel carriers and ammunition in the city to help the SPLM–N take more territory. The group has approximately 20,000 fighters in the Nuba Mountains. It calls the territory it controls "New Sudan". Its capital is Kauda, a farming town, where the rebel government issues driver's licenses and birth certificates, and has a court system made up of volunteer judges, "deciding everything from dowry disputes to murder cases", and schools teaching in English. Concerns of the group are hundreds of thousands of displaced people pouring in to its territory from other parts of Sudan, a devastating drought, famine, that have led to the eating of leaves from bushes, and in some cases starvation and government airstrikes.

In December 2025, the SPLM–N (al-Hilu) claimed to have retaken the town of Qardoud Nama in South Kordofan from the SAF. The SAF also retook the town of Mabsouta from the SPLM–N (al-Hilu), which had occupied the area since 2011.

== Aims and ideology ==
The party describes itself as "a Sudanese national movement that seeks to change the policies of the centre in Khartoum and to build a new centre for the benefit of all Sudanese people regardless of their religion, gender or ethnicity background". Among the principles of the SPLM going back to the 1980s, are opposition to discrimination (by "Arabs" and others) against Black Africans. In an effort to play down the divisions that have long plagued Sudan, the group encourages those in its territory to identify as Nuba and not by religion or tribe.

Journalist Nicholas Casey describes SPLM–N (al-Hilu) as "among the few rebel groups to claim it is fighting for a Western-style democracy: It has a Constitution and calls for a secular state in Sudan".

Since the resumption of conflict, the party has called for negotiations and a ceasefire; however, some leaders of the SPLA-N have warned of a potential second partition of Sudan.

== Groups and factions ==
=== SPLM–N (al-Hilu) ===
As of 2017, Abdelaziz al-Hilu heads the SPLM–N (al-Hilu) faction. This faction opposes the Sudanese Armed Forces and as a member of the Sudan Founding Alliance, supports the Rapid Support Forces's attempt to form a parallel Government of Peace and Unity. As of February 2025, SPLM–N (al-Hilu) controls the town of Kauda and the surrounding area. In July 2025, he was proclaimed the deputy leader of a governing alliance headed by the RSF's leader Hemedti.

=== SPLM–N (Agar) ===
Since 2017, the SPLM–N (Agar faction) has been chaired by Malik Agar and Ismael Jallab is the secretary-general. The faction was appointed in the Transitional Sovereignty Council and currently supports the Sudanese Armed Forces.
