= Attempted assassination of Abdel Fattah al-Burhan =

2024 assassination of Sudanese leader

- Part of the Sudanese civil war
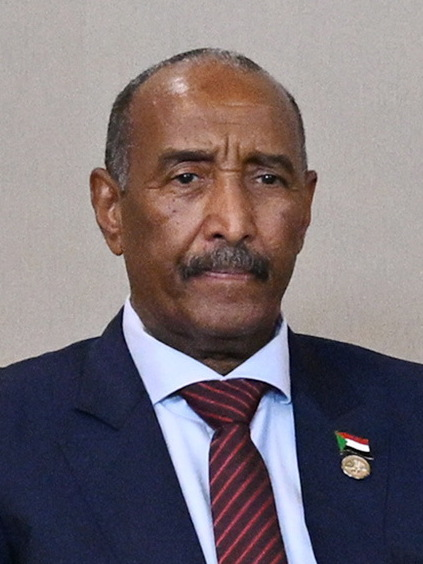
- Al-Burhan in 2025
- Date: 30 July 2024; 22 months ago
- Location: Jubayt, Red Sea State, Sudan
- Type: Drone strike
- Target: Abdel Fattah al-Burhan
- Participants: Unknown
- Outcome: Failure to assassinate Burhan
- Deaths: 5

On 30 July 2024, the de facto ruler of Sudan and concurrent chairman of its Transitional Sovereignty Council and head of the Sudanese Armed Forces (SAF), General Abdel Fattah al-Burhan survived an assassination attempt using drones at a military graduation ceremony in Jubayt, Red Sea State in eastern Sudan.

== Background ==
On 15 April 2023, Sudan's paramilitary Rapid Support Forces (RSF) launched attacks against al-Burhan's government, triggering a civil war. Al-Burhan was pinned down at SAF headquarters in the capital Khartoum until August 2023, when an SAF operation enabled him to evacuate to Port Sudan, where he has been based since then.

== Attack ==
Al-Burhan was attending a ceremony at a military base in Jubayt, Red Sea State. Two drones struck the facility after the ceremony ended, killing five people and injuring several others. The dead consisted of two of al-Burhan's bodyguards and three military cadets. Al-Burhan, believed to be the main target, survived and was evacuated. According to SAF spokesperson Nabil Abdallah, he was unharmed.

The assassination attempt was carried out a day after the Sudanese foreign ministry announced that it would participate in talks with the RSF in Switzerland in August. The RSF claimed that they are open to negotiations with the junta but not with Islamists being part of the civil service.

== Responsibility ==
The SAF blamed the RSF for the attack, but the latter denied responsibility and blamed Islamists, particularly the Al-Bara' ibn Malik Battalion as part of infighting between the SAF and its allies. The SAF later said that it had determined the exact location from where the drones were launched.

== Aftermath ==
Following the attempted assassination, al-Burhan addressed the audience at the ceremony, saying that he ruled out negotiations with the RSF and that "We will not retreat, we will not surrender, and we will not negotiate."
