= Hemedti =

Leader of the Rapid Support Forces (born c. 1974)

General Muhammad Hamdan Dagalo
- حميدتي
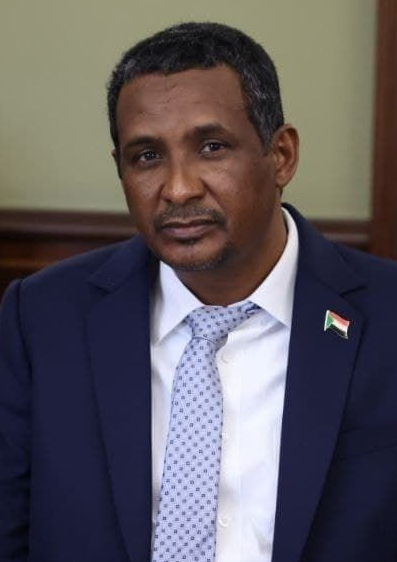
- Hemedti in 2022

President of Presidium of the Presidential Council of the Government of Peace and Unity
- Incumbent
- Assumed office 15 April 2025 (Note: Official establishment of office on 26 July 2025. Took oath of office on 30 August 2025.)
- Prime Minister: Mohammed Hassan al-Ta'ishi
- Deputy: Abdelaziz al-Hilu
- Preceded by: Himself (as leader of the territory of the RSF)

Leader of the Territory of the Rapid Support Forces (Note: As commander of the RSF.)
- De facto 15 April 2023 – 15 April 2025
- Preceded by: Position established
- Succeeded by: Himself (as president of the GPU)

Deputy Leader of Sudan (Note: As Deputy Chairman of the Transitional Military Council from April to August 2019, then Deputy Chairman of the Transitional Sovereignty Council from August 2019 to October 2021, and again from November 2021 to May 2023.)
- De facto 13 April 2019 – 19 May 2023
- Leader: Abdel Fattah al-Burhan
- Prime Minister: Abdalla Hamdok; Osman Hussein (acting)
- Preceded by: Kamal Abdel-Marouf al-Mahdi
- Succeeded by: Malik Agar

Commander of the Rapid Support Forces
- Incumbent
- Assumed command 2013
- Preceded by: New command
Other offices held
Deputy Chairman of the Transitional Sovereignty Council
In office 11 November 2021 – 19 May 2023
Chairman	Abdel Fattah al-Burhan
Succeeded by	Malik Agar
In office 21 August 2019 – 25 October 2021
Chairman	Abdel Fattah al-Burhan
Preceded by	Himself (as Deputy Chairman of the Transitional Military Council)
Deputy Chairman of the Transitional Military Council
In office 13 April 2019 – 20 August 2019
Chairman	Abdel Fattah al-Burhan
Preceded by	Kamal Abdel-Marouf al-Mahdi
Succeeded by	Himself (as Deputy Chairman of the Transitional Sovereignty Council)

Personal details
- Born: Muhammad Hamdan Dagalo Musa; 1974 (age 51–52) Sudan or Chad
- Relations: Abdul Rahim (brother); Algoney (brother)
- Known for: Leader of RSF during the Sudanese civil war (2023–present)
- Nickname(s): Hemedti (Arabic: حميدتي), Butcher of Darfur

Military service
- Allegiance: Sudan (2003–2023); Territory of the Rapid Support Forces (2023–2025); Government of Peace and Unity (2025–present)
- Branch/service: Janjaweed (2003–2013); Rapid Support Forces (2013–present)
- Years of service: 2003–present
- Rank: General
- Commands: Head of the Rapid Support Forces
- Battles/wars: War in Darfur; Yemeni civil war (2014–present); Saudi-led intervention in the Yemeni civil war 2019 Sudanese coup d'état 2021 Sudanese coup d'état Sudanese civil war (2023–present): Battle of Khartoum

Muhammad Hamdan Dagalo Musa (Note: Arabic: محمد حمدان دقلو موسى, romanized: Muḥammad Ḥamdān Daqlū Mūsā) (born c. 1973–1975), commonly known by his nom de guerre Hemedti, (Note: Arabic: حميدتي, romanized: Ḥamīdtī; also spelled Hemetti or Hemeti, meaning "little Mohamed") is a Sudanese military officer and politician who serves as the head of the paramilitary Rapid Support Forces (RSF), which is involved in the Sudanese civil war against the Sudanese Armed Forces (SAF) led by Abdel Fattah al-Burhan. He is also serving as the chairman of the presidential council of the unrecognized Government of Peace and Unity since 2025.

A Janjaweed chief from the Rizeigat tribe in Darfur, Hemedti was one of the warlords leading the Janjaweed in the war in Darfur and is accused by several organizations to be one of the perpetrators of the Darfur genocide (2003–2005). Hemedti later joined the RSF and has served as its military head since 2013. He took part in the revolution against President Omar al-Bashir, and, following the 2019 Sudanese coup d'état, became the deputy head of the Transitional Military Council (TMC). On 21 August 2019, the TMC transferred power to the civilian–military Transitional Sovereignty Council, of which Hemedti is a member. As of 2019, Hemedti was considered one of the richest people in Sudan via his company, al-Junaid, which had a wide array of business interests including investment, mining, transport, car rental, iron and steel. On behalf of the TMC, Hemedti signed a political agreement on 17 July 2019 and the Draft Constitutional Declaration on 4 August 2019, together with Ahmed Rabee on behalf of the Forces of Freedom and Change (FFC), as major steps in the 2019 Sudanese transition to democracy. Under Article 19 of the Draft Constitutional Declaration, Hemedti and the other Sovereignty Council members would be ineligible to run in the next Sudanese general election. In September 2019, Hemedti helped negotiate a peace deal between groups in armed conflict in Port Sudan.

In October 2021, Hemedti took part in army leader Abdel Fattah al-Burhan's 2021 Sudan coup d'état, but a growing rift between him and al-Burhan caused him to call that coup a "mistake" in February 2023, and in April 2023 he mobilised the RSF against al-Burhan's government and captured key government sites (although al-Burhan disputed this), and thereby started the current Sudanese civil war.

According to Human Rights Watch and professor Eric Reeves, the RSF was responsible for crimes against humanity, including systematic killings of civilians and rapes, in Darfur in 2014 and 2015. Hemedti was also involved in the 23 November 2004 attack on the village of Adwa which resulted in a massacre and rape, and said that the attacks had been planned for months, earning him the sobriquet "Butcher of Darfur". According to Al Jazeera and The Daily Beast, the Sudanese Transitional Military Council, headed by the RSF, holds major responsibility for the 3 June 2019 Khartoum massacre.

== Childhood and youth ==
Muhammad Hamdan Dagalo Musa asserts his birthplace as Sudan, yet according to the BBC, The Guardian and Al Jazeera his family, who are part of a Rizeigat tribe known for camel herding and trading, migrated to the Darfur region in western Sudan in the 1980s, escaping from war and drought in Chad. Sources differ on Hemedti's date of birth, with various publications placing it at differing points between 1973 and 1975.

In a 2009 interview with Foreign Policy, Hemedti reiterated the same story to Journalist Jérôme Tubiana. Tubiana continued in his article on Hemedti that "His uncle Juma Dagalo, chief of the Rizeigat tribe of the nomadic Baggara Arabs, failed to be recognized as a tribal leader in North Darfur state, but South Darfur authorities welcomed the newcomers and allowed them to settle on land belonging to the Fur tribe, Darfur’s main indigenous non-Arab group."

Hemedti attended primary school up to third grade and received no other formal education. He moved to North Darfur and then settled in South Darfur in 1987. He is a member of the Awlad Mansour sub-section of the Mahariya tribe, which is part of the camel-herding (Abbala) Northern Rizeigat tribal confederation.

Hemedti may have traded camels prior to the War in Darfur. This claim was called into question with at least one source instead calling him "a highwayman." However this claim was later debunked by Jerome Tubiana, a researcher, journalist and the International Crisis Group's former senior Sudan analyst.

== Paramilitary career and criminal allegations ==
He was one of the perpetrators of the Darfur genocide. Hemedti became a leader of the Janjaweed during the War in Darfur that started in 2003 and an "amir" in the Border Guards in the same year. He was appointed brigadier–general in the newly created Rapid Support Forces (RSF) by the 1989–2019 government of Omar al-Bashir, who, as of 10 June 2019, is a fugitive indicted for war crimes, crimes against humanity and genocide by the International Criminal Court (ICC). The RSF was created in 2013 under the leadership of Hemedti, out of former Janjaweed groups of fighters, several of whose leaders and supporters (Ahmed Haroun, Ali Kushayb, Abdel Rahim Mohammed Hussein, in addition to al-Bashir) have been indicted for war crimes by the ICC.

Sudanese political cartoonist Khalid Albaih claimed that the soldiers commanded by Hemedti "committed countless war crimes" during the war. A European diplomat interviewed by The National claimed that Hemedti aims to "distance himself" from the war crimes that occurred during the war. Niemat Ahmadi, the founder of the Darfur Women Action Group, stated that Hemedti became well known during the War in Darfur "because of the people he killed, the number of villages he destroyed, the many women who were raped".

Sudan researcher Eric Reeves estimated that it is "likely" that Hemedti has "accumulated more Sudanese blood on his hands in conflict in Darfur and [in the conflict in] South Kordofan—as well as in Khartoum and elsewhere—than any other man in the country" and that Hemedti's management of the war was "by means of serial atrocity crimes, including genocide and crimes against humanity".

=== 23 November 2004 Adwa massacre ===
Hemedti was the leader of one of the Rizeigat militias who killed 126 villagers, including 36 children, in Adwa in South Darfur in a methodical, systematic attack starting on 23 November 2004 at 6am. The militias burned all the houses, and burned some bodies and threw others in wells to hide evidence of the massacre. Under Hemedti's direct orders, the militias shot male villagers immediately, raped young girls and detained women for two days. Hemedti stated to African Union officials that the massacre had been planned in coordination with government soldiers over several months.

=== 2014–2015 crimes against humanity in Darfur ===
In 2014, the RSF, led by Hemedti, carried out the "Operation Decisive Summer" in South Darfur and North Darfur from late February to early May 2014, during which they carried out "killings, mass rape and torture of civilians; the forced displacement of entire communities; the destruction of the physical infrastructure necessary for sustaining life in the harsh desert environment including wells, food stores, shelter, and farming implements." RSF members under Hemedti's command repeatedly attacked and burned 10 towns in South Darfur, mostly during the two days starting 27 February 2014. Witnesses interviewed by Human Rights Watch (HRW) reported killings of civilians and rapes by RSF personnel.

Sudan Liberation Movement/Army rebels of Minni Minawi's faction (SLA/MM) had been present in some of the towns but had left them at the time of the crimes against humanity carried out under Hemedti's command. Witnesses reported men shot in the head by the RSF after having been forced to lie on the ground, and women selected for rape in the bush. Khalil, a witness from Hiraiga, stated that he saw Hemedti enter Hiraiga with other RSF members on the day that seven women, whom Khalil named, were raped either in Hiraiga or in Afouna nearby. In the village of Um Bargarain, Hemedti's RSF separated the men from the children and assassinated the men.

In March 2014, Hemedti's RSF moved to North Darfur and continued to destroy villages in which the SLA/MM was absent and shot and raped civilians. In "Operation Decisive Summer" phase II, the RSF, together with other government soldiers, carried out a campaign of killings of civilians and rapes in Jebel Marra and East Jebel Marra from December 2014 to May 2015.

Ibrahim, a defector from RSF interviewed by HRW, stated that Hemedti and other RSF officers gave orders to "abuse women". Ibrahim saw 11 women raped during an RSF attack on Hijer Tunyo and admitted to killing one woman whom he tried to rape.

=== Crimes against humanity in Yemen ===
Hemedti recruited fighters from Sudan to fight as mercenaries in the Saudi–Emirati intervention in the Yemeni civil war. Hemedti's RSF and other Sudanese security forces killed civilians, destroyed infrastructure and committed other war crimes.

== Business interests ==
Hemedti used the RSF to take over gold mines and arrest rival Janjaweed leader Musa Hilal in November 2017, with the result that Hemedti became the biggest gold trader in Sudan via his company al-Junaid. This gave him considerable financial power in Sudan since gold trade constituted forty percent of Sudanese exports in 2017. Al-Junaid (or Al Gunade) is run by Hemedti's brother Abdul Rahim Hamdan Dagalo, the deputy head of the RSF, and two of Abdul Rahim's sons.

Hemedti was on the Al Junaid Board of Directors in 2009. By around 2019, al-Junaid had expanded to deal in "investment, mining, transport, car rental, iron and steel". In April 2019 Hemedti was described by Alex de Waal as "one of the richest men in Sudan ... at the centre of a web of patronage, secret security deals, and political payoffs." The gold mined in Sudan was sent to Dubai in the United Arab Emirates, where Hemedti kept much of his money, which he used to fund his paramilitaries. In 2019, Global Witness reported that the UAE was a key supplier of military equipment to the RSF. Both Hemedti and Abdel Fattah al-Burhan had ties to the Putin regime in Russia. According to Business Insider, "The two generals helped Russian President Vladimir Putin exploit Sudan's gold resources to help buttress Russian finances against Western sanctions and fund his war in Ukraine."

The UAE had helped Hemedti to strengthen his military through many business deals that were channeled through Dubai. UAE had also paid huge sums of money to Hemedti to send thousands of troops to Yemen to fight their proxy war. The Yemen war had hugely benefited General Hamdan. Hemedti also visited Russia during the Russian invasion of Ukraine to sign a partnership deal with the Wagner Group in exchange for giving them the license to mine gold in Sudan. According to Western officials, General Hamdan’s wealth includes livestock, real estate and private security firms, with much of the money held in Dubai. It helped Hemedti build his paramilitary forces which as of 2023 were better equipped than the regular Sudanese military.

== 2019 Sudanese coup d'état ==
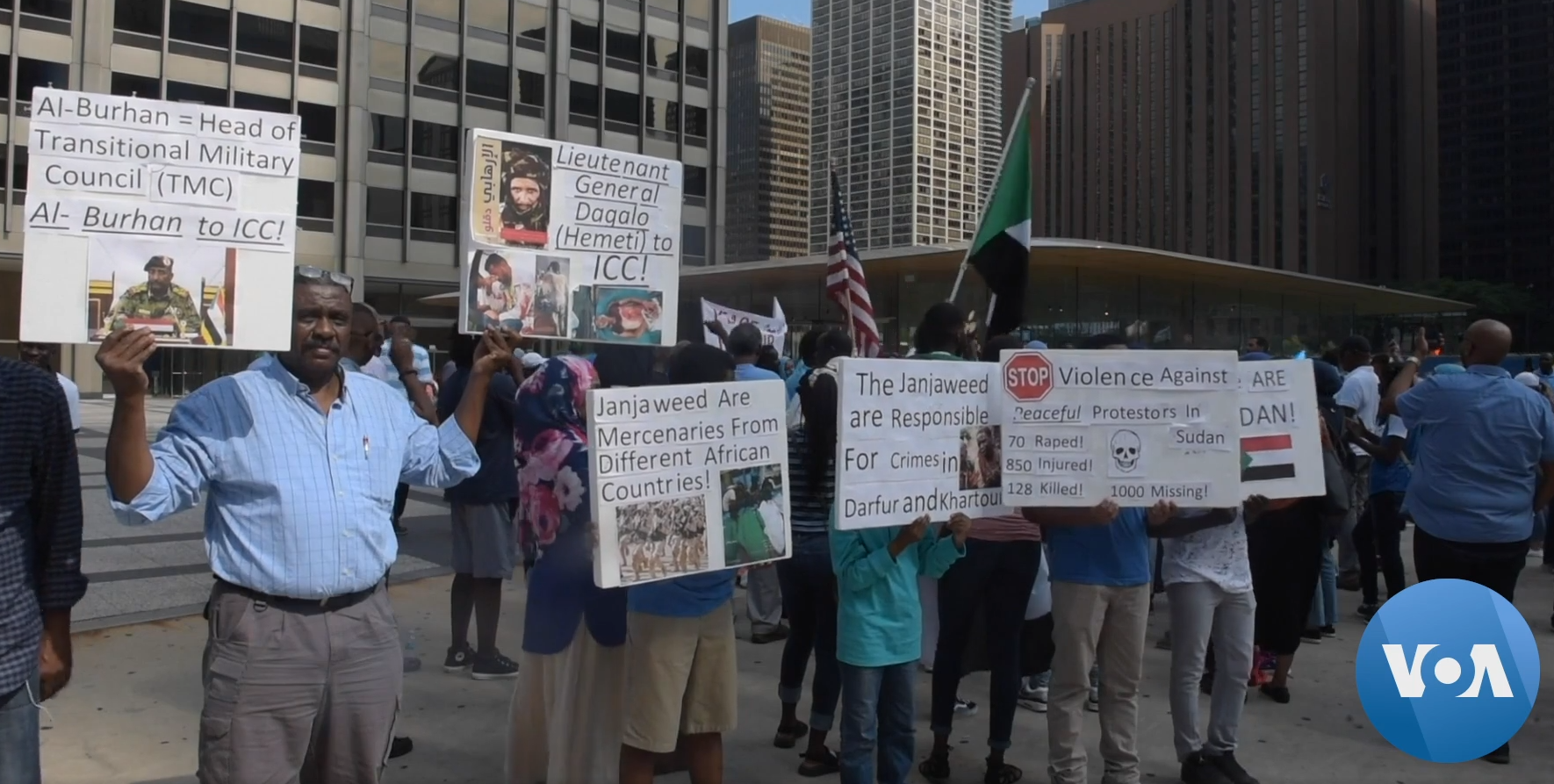
2019 Sudanese protests in Chicago.

Hemedti became Deputy head of the Transitional Military Council (TMC) after using the RSF to detain former president al-Bashir during the 2019 Sudanese coup d'état. Hemedti was considered by The Economist to be the most powerful person in Sudan as of early July 2019.

In May 2019, Hemedti's first international trip was to Saudi Arabia to meet Mohammad bin Salman, during which he stated: "Sudan is standing with the kingdom against all threats and attacks from Iran and Houthi militias." Al Jazeera English suggested that Hemedti was seen as the real head of the Transitional Military Council rather than the official head Abdel Fattah al-Burhan. The National described Hemedti as "widely seen to be ambitious and a seasoned political player".

The 3 June 2019 Khartoum massacre in which 100 protestors were killed, hundreds wounded, and other civilians raped and homes pillaged, were carried out in large part by the RSF under Hemedti's leadership according to The Daily Beast and Sudanese political cartoonist Khalid Albaih. Albaih described Hemedti as "Sudan's version of Saudi Crown Prince Mohammed bin Salman, ..., young and power-hungry ... and just like MBS[,] ruthless."

== 2019 transition procedures ==
On behalf of the TMC, as the 2018–19 Sudanese protests continued, Hemedti signed a Political Agreement on 17 July 2019, together with Ahmed Rabee on behalf of the FFC. On 4 August 2019 Hemedti and Rabee signed, on behalf of the TMC and FFC, a Constitutional Declaration to define details of transitional arrangements absent from the Political Agreement. The transition procedures plan for a 39-month duration including a Sovereign Council of five civilians, five military officials, and a civilian leader chosen by consensus between the TMC and the FFC.

=== Sovereignty Council member ===
On 21 August 2019, Hemedti became one of the 11 members of the transitional, collective, combined military–civilian head of state, called the Sovereignty Council. Under Article 19 of the August 2019 Draft Constitutional Declaration, Hemedti, along with the other Sovereignty Council members, is forbidden from running in the 2022 Sudanese general election scheduled to end the transitional period.

In September 2019, Hemedti helped groups in Port Sudan from the Beni-Amer people and the Nuba peoples who had been in armed conflict to reach a conciliation deal. Before the signing ceremony, he had said that he would deport both tribes, if they did not reach a deal, and after the deal was signed, he apologised for his "earlier tough language".

Dagalo was funded by the United Arab Emirates and met with the leader of the UAE, Sheikh Mohamed bin Zayed Al Nahyan, in February 2022.

On 13 March 2023, he arrived in Eritrea and met with Eritrean President Isaias Afwerki.

=== Peace negotiations ===
Hemedti led the governmental negotiations team with the rebel movements in Juba, the capital of South Sudan. Following many rounds of talks with the leaders of these movements, who have been rebelling against the state since 2003 in the regions of Darfur, Blue Nile, and South Kordofan, they managed to reach a peace agreement in October 2020.

== Sudanese civil war (2023–present) ==
The military situation in Sudan, as of 9 November 2026

On 15 April 2023, Dagalo's Rapid Support Forces launched various attacks against Sudanese Army bases across the country, including in the capital Khartoum. Later, fighting broke out between the Rapid Support Forces and the Army, as clashes were reported at the Presidential Palace and at the residence of General al-Burhan; both Dagalo and Abdel Fattah al-Burhan of the Sudanese armed forces claimed control over the two sites. On 15 April, Dagalo claimed that SAF commanders were attempting to return recently deposed leader Omar al-Bashir back to power.

On 16 April, Abdalla Hamdok, the Former Prime Minister of Sudan appealed to both Dagalo and al-Burhan to agree on a permanent cease fire and stop the fighting. Dagalo claimed his forces were defending against “radical Islamists” in Sudan via his Twitter. As of 1 May, the clashes have continued, although with occasional ceasefires. On 19 May 2023, Dagalo was formally dismissed from his Transitional Sovereignty Council position by decree, allegedly appointing Malik Agar in his place.

Dagalo's RSF had received help from foreign countries. Russia's Wagner Group, Libya's LNA commander Khalifa Haftar, and the United Arab Emirates had reportedly helped the RSF with military supplies, helicopters, and weapons. The WHO confirmed that in six days of war, 413 people had been killed, 3,551 had been injured, and 11 health facilities had come under attack.

This is a list of the countries he has visited since the start of the war.

- Uganda
- Ethiopia
- Djibouti
- Kenya
- South Africa
- Rwanda

On 1 July 2025, the RSF and the SPLM-N (al-Hilu) announced the creation in Nyala of a governing alliance headed by Hemedti, with SPLM-N leader Abdelaziz al-Hilu as his deputy.

=== Death hoax ===
In April 2023, a Twitter account impersonating the Rapid Support Forces announced that Hemedti had died following injuries sustained in combat. The tweet received 1.7 million views before being taken down.

=== Genocide sanctions ===
In January 2025, US government imposed sanctions against Hemedti, stating that this was in response to the RSF's role in committing genocide during the ongoing conflict in Sudan. The U.S. sanctions freeze Dagalo’s assets and bar him from entering the US. The RSF and affiliated militias have targeted civilians, subjecting them to violence (including sexual violence), contributing to widespread displacement and deaths. He was also sanctioned by Australia for human rights violations on 5 November 2026.

=== Support from the UAE ===
As per the US officials, the UAE was backing General Hamdan in the 2023 civil war. The Emirates denied its involvement in the war. The American officials said Hemedti video-recorded speeches for Sudanese supporters from a protected residence in Abu Dhabi. According to Sudanese diplomats, his closest ally in the Emirates is the country's vice president, Mansour bin Zayed Al Nahyan. The US intelligence identified Hemedti’s direct phone connection with Mohamed bin Zayed Al Nahyan and Mansour bin Zayed through interceptors. As per Jeffrey D. Feltman, the US was aware that the Emirati working behind the scenes in Sudan is Sheikh Mansour. Two of the charities overseen by Sheikh Mansour also built a field hospital at an airbase in Chad for humanitarian purposes, but it was instead used for a covert operation of supplying arms to the RSF militia.

=== Allegations of injury ===
On May 16 2026, "al-Savanna" a RSF commander who defected to fight alongside SAF alleged that Hemedti had been injured in a previous strike outside the military headquarters of Khartoum. According to al-Savannah Hemedti no longer holds any decision-making power in RSF and all the decisions are made by foreign parties.

=== Trial in absentia ===
On 12 July 2026, a court in Port Sudan sentenced Hemedti and 15 others to death in absentia over massacres and murders in Darfur.
