= Mohamed al-Faki =

Member of the Sovereignty Council of Sudan

- محمد الفكي سليمان

Member of the Sovereignty Council of Sudan
- In office 21 August 2019 – 25 October 2021
- Prime Minister: Abdalla Hamdok
- Preceded by: Abdel Fattah al-Burhan (as Chairman of the Transitional Military Council and head of state)

Personal details
- Born: 1978 or 1979 (age 47–48)
- Occupation: journalist and activist

Mohamed al-Faki Suleiman (also Alfaki, Elfaki, El Faki; born c. 1979; Arabic: محمد الفكي سليمان) is a Sudanese politician who was the youngest member of the Sovereignty Council of Sudan. Under Article 19 of the August 2019 Draft Constitutional Declaration, al-Faki, as is the case for the other members of the Sovereignty Council, is ineligible to run in the election scheduled to follow the 39-month transition to democracy period. The Sovereignty Council was later dissolved in October 2021 after a military coup led by Abdelfattah El Burhan in the 25th of October 2021. Elfaki was arrested illegally for over 2 months without trial, following this coup.

== Education ==
Al-Faki studied political science.

== Journalism and political activism ==
Al-Faki published two novels and a political book, Challenges of Building the State of Sudan.

=== Sudanese Revolution ===
According to Radio Dabanga, al-Faki was active in the Unionist Alliance that was one of the founding coalitions that created the Forces of Freedom and Change (FFC) alliance, the major civilian coordination body during the Sudanese Revolution, in January 2019.

== Sovereignty Council ==
On 21 August 2019, al-Faki became one of the civilian members of the joint civilian–military transitionary head of state of Sudan called the Sovereignty Council of Sudan.

Al-Faki frequently acted as the Sovereignty Council's spokesperson. A week after the formal transfer of power from the Transitional Military Council to the Sovereignty Council, al-Faki commented on a controversy regarding facilities to be provided to the Sovereignty Council members. According to Asharq Al-Awsat, rumours circulated that council members "received Infiniti luxury cars and were offered by the presidential palace authorities to move to first-class hotels until their presidential residences were equipped", which was considered by Sudanese citizens to represent the lavishness of the Omar al-Bashir government. The presidency was estimated to own between 800 and 1000 luxury cars valued together at US$2.3 billion. Al-Faki responded to the rumour by stating that the cars "are the property of the state, and used in official ceremonies" and that they would not be used by the council members. Asharq Al-Awsat estimates the presidency budget for 2019 at twice the total budget for education and health. Al-Faki stated the appreciation by "the political class" of the criticism.

On 10 October 2019, al-Faki announced the appointment of Nemat Abdullah Khair as Chief Justice of Sudan and Tag el-Sir el-Hibir as Attorney-General.

== Arrest and dissolution of Sovereignty Council ==
On 25 October 2021, Faki was confirmed to have been arrested following a military coup which overthrew the Sudanese government. The same day, the Sovereignty Council of Sudan which Faki served on would be dissolved as well. In April 2022, Mohamed el-Feki Suleiman was released by the Sudanese junta.
