= 2025 Arab League summit =

Meeting of Arab regional organization

2025 Arab League Summit
- Host country: Iraq
- Date: May 2025
- Cities: Baghdad
- Participants: 20 out of 25
- Chair: Abdul Latif Rashid
- Follows: 2024 Arab League summit
- Precedes: 2026 Arab League summit
- Website: summit.iq

The 2025 Arab League summit, officially the 34th Ordinary Session of the Council of the League of Arab States at the Summit Level, was a meeting of heads of state and government of member states of the League of Arab States that took place in Baghdad, Iraq In May 2025.

== Background ==
Iraqi president Abdul Latif Rashid announced during his speech at the 33rd Arab League summit, in Manama, Bahrain, that Iraq will host the summit for 2025.

When invitations to the summit were issued, controversy arose regarding the invitation of Syrian president Ahmed al-Sharaa due to his former ties to Al-Qaeda in Iraq and his role in the Iraqi insurgency. On 13 May 2025, al-Sharaa declined the invitation; it was decided Syria's delegation will be headed by foreign minister Asaad al-Shaibani.

Iraqi authorities banned protests and demonstrations from 11–20 May.

On May 15, 2025, the Foreign Ministers of member states met to finalize the summit agenda and highlighted the important topics that need to be addressed, which included the situation in Palestine, national security and counter-terrorism in the Arab world.

The Arab League also invited Spanish Prime Minister Pedro Sánchez. Spain was the only European country present at the summit. The Secretary-General of the United Nations, António Guterres, as well as Luigi Di Maio, the European Union Special Representative for the Gulf also participated. In addition, Mahamoud Ali Youssouf, the Chairperson of the African Union Commission as well as the Secretary-Generals of the Organisation of Islamic Cooperation and Gulf Cooperation Council participated. Libya was the only Arab League members not to participate.

== Participants ==
Members
Country / Organization	Represented by	Title	Ref.
Arab League	Ahmed Aboul Gheit	Secretary General	
Algeria	Mohammed Sufian Al-Barah	Foreign Minister	
Bahrain	Abdullatif bin Rashid Al Zayani	Foreign Minister	
Comoros	Mbae Mohammed	Foreign Minister	
Djibouti	Abdul Qader Hussein	Foreign Minister	
Egypt	Abdel Fattah el-Sisi	Vice President	
Iraq	Mohammed Shia' Al Sudani	Deputy Prime Minister	
Jordan	Jafar Hassan	Deputy Prime Minister	
Kuwait	Abdullah Al Yahya	Foreign Minister	
Lebanon	Nawaf Salam	Deputy Prime Minister	
Morocco	Nasser Bourita	Foreign Minister	
Oman	Shihab bin Tariq Al Said	Deputy Prime Minister	
Palestine	Mahmoud Abbas	Vice President	
Qatar	Tamim bin Hamad Al Thani	Emir of Qatar	
Saudi Arabia	Adel al-Jubeir	Foreign Minister	
Somalia	Hassan Sheikh Mohamud	Vice President	
Sudan	Ibrahim Jaber	Sudanese Sovereignty Council member	
Mauritania	Mohamed Ould Cheikh Ahmed	Foreign Minister	
Syria	Asaad al-Shaibani	Foreign Minister	
Tunisia	Mohammed Ali al-Nafti	Foreign Minister	
United Arab Emirates	Sheikh Mansour bin Zayed	Vice President	
Yemen	Rashad al-Alimi	Vice President	
Guests
Spain	Pedro Sánchez	Deputy Prime Minister	
ASEAN	Kao Kim Hourn	Under-Secretary-General	
Organisation of Islamic Cooperation	Yousef Al-Othaimeen	Under-Secretary-General	
European Union	Luigi Di Maio	Under-Secretary-General	

== Outcomes ==
The summit's main agenda revolved around the ongoing war in Palestine. The final declaration urged Arab countries and international organizations to support the creation of an Arab Solidarity Fund supervised by the Arab League, for the reconstruction of Gaza and Lebanon. The declaration highlighted the devastation of the Gaza Strip and the importance of rebuilding Gaza while rejecting the forced displacement of Palestinians. Iraq pledged a contribution of $20m towards the reconstruction fund for Gaza, and another $20m for Lebanon, which has also been affected by the war with Israel.

Iraq also unveiled several initiatives headed by Iraq to bolster Arab coordination on matters of national security, namely with the founding of the Joint Arab Security Coordination Chamber, as well as establishing a number of joint coordination centres to combat terrorism, narcotics, as well as transnational crime, all headquartered in Baghdad.

On the developmental front, Iraq suggested establishing a "common Arab mechanism for assessing developmental performance" in terms of social development indicators, stressing that "it is necessary to move to invest in the knowledge economy [of Arab nations], as it represents an opportunity for development." Iraq also proposed establishing the Arab Centre for Artificial Intelligence, in Baghdad.

On the economic front, Iraq suggested the formation of an intra-Arab business council named the Council of Arab Trade Ministers to coordinate on matters of commerce that can benefit Arab countries; such as, by launching the Arab Economic Reform Covenant initiative for the next decade, which includes providing an integrated and shared investment environment, trade liberalisation, and the establishment of free trade zones. The covenant includes the development of road networks infrastructure, railways and renewable energy facilities, and the promotion of industrial and agricultural integration, through the establishment of joint industrial cities. Furthermore, Iraq urged other Arab countries to join the Development Road project.

On the environmental front, Iraq announced the Arab Initiative to Achieve Food Security, and the Baghdad Initiative to Enhance Arab Cooperation in Facing Environmental Challenges and Climate Change, including by providing a safe haven for those affected by disasters as well as enhancing Arab housing security. Iraq also proposed establishing the Financial Action Group for the Middle East and North Africa, and the Financial Intelligence Unit Group, and the Arab Centre for the Protection of the Environment from War Remnants.

On the cultural front, Iraq suggested establishing the Arab Council for Cultural Interaction between Arab States.
