= Mohammed Hassan al-Ta'ishi =

Sudanese politician

- محمد حسن عثمان التعايشي
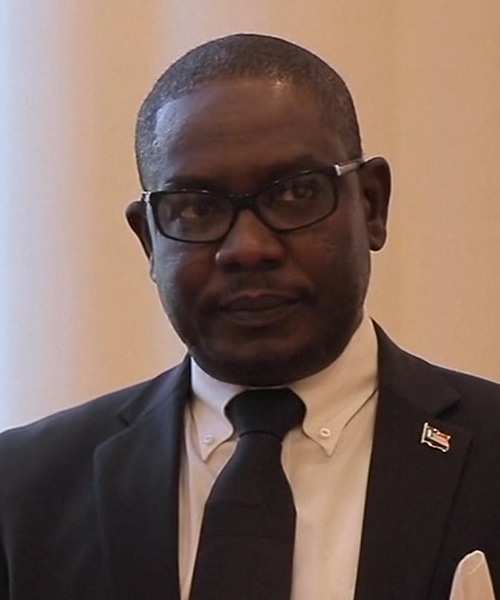
- Al-Ta'ishi in 2020

Transitional Prime Minister of the Transitional Cabinet of the Government of Peace and Unity
- Incumbent
- Assumed office 26 July 2025
- President: Hemedti
- Vice President: Abdelaziz al-Hilu
- Preceded by: Office established

Member of the Transitional Sovereignty Council
- In office 21 August 2019 – 25 October 2021
- Chairman: Abdel Fattah al-Burhan
- Preceded by: Office established
- Succeeded by: Office abolished

Personal details
- Education: University of Khartoum
- Profession: Politician

Mohammed Hassan Osman al-Ta'ishi (Arabic: محمد حسن عثمان التعايشي) is a Sudanese politician currently serving as the prime minister of the rival Government of Peace and Unity in opposition to the internationally recognised Government of Sudan. He served as a member of the Transitional Sovereignty Council of Sudan from 2019 until its dissolution in October 2021 following the military coup.

== Biography ==
Al-Ta'ishi attended the University of Khartoum, graduating in 2004 with a Bachelor of Science in economics and anthropology. He worked with the Darfur Compensation Commission and the Darfur Reconstruction and Development Fund, two organizations that worked to end the War in Darfur after being founded by the 2006 Abuja Agreement. He has written articles about various topics relating to Sudan, including "immigration, demographic changes, peace and democratization" in the country. He also wrote a chapter in a book on "the role of students in the political struggle in Sudan". After working in Darfur from 2007 to 2010, he worked with the Governance Bureau in Khartoum from 2010 to 2013. In 2019, he became a civilian member and one of 11 members of the Sovereignty Council of Sudan (or Transitional Sovereignty Council), which served as the collective head of state of Sudan following the Sudanese revolution.

On the Sovereignty Council, al-Ta'ishi served on the Higher Council for Peace and as an ex officio member of the Security and Defense Counsel, working to reform the Sudanese state and serving as a negotiator. He was chief negotiator and played a major role in 2020 in drafting the Juba Peace Agreement between the Sovereignty Council and the Sudan Revolutionary Front. Afterwards, he served as Chair of the High Committee for Monitoring and Evaluating the Implementation of the Juba Peace Agreement and was the Chair of the Conference on Governance High Committee, before leaving the Council in October 2021 after the 2021 Sudanese coup d'état.

On 26 July 2025, al-Ta'ishi was announced as the new prime minister for the Government of Peace and Unity, a rival government which administers areas controlled by the Rapid Support Forces and opposes the internationally recognised Transitional Sovereignty Council.
