= 2021 Sudanese coup d'état =

Military overthrow of the Sovereignty Council of Sudan

- Part of the Sudanese transition to democracy and the Coup Belt
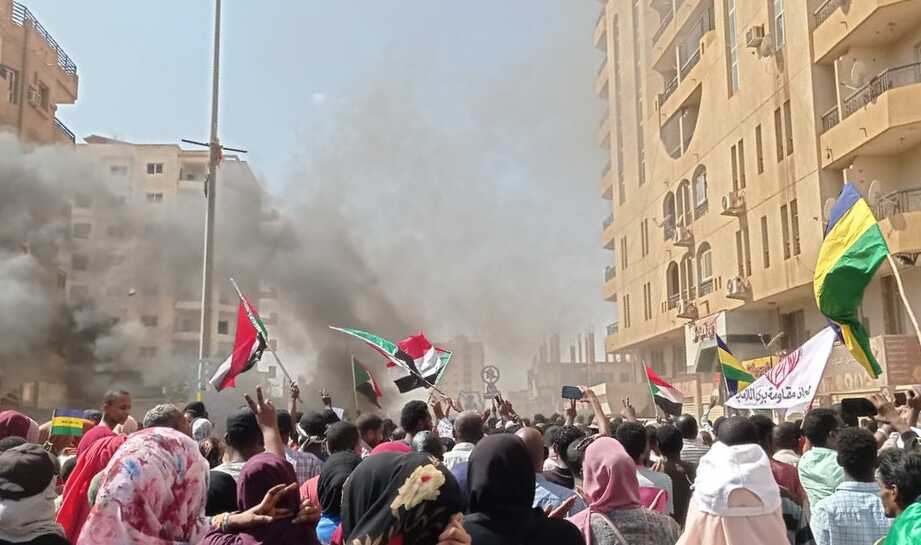
- A civil demonstration against the October 2021 coup in Sudan
Date	25 October – 21 November 2021
Location	Khartoum, Sudan 15°36′32″N 32°31′43″E
Result	Military coup d'état successful: General Abdel Fattah al-Burhan temporarily seizes power, dissolves the government, declares state of emergency; Prime Minister Abdalla Hamdok and other ministers arrested; Mass civil disobedience and protests; Re-formation of the Transitional Sovereignty Council on 11 November with most civilian members replaced by military appointees; Reinstatement of the Hamdok government and the August 2019 Draft Constitutional Declaration on 21 November; Hamdok resigns on 2 January 2022 due to the military's monopolization of power; Sudan descends into civil war in 2023 following political crises which occurred as a result of the coup

Belligerents
Sovereignty Council of Sudan; Forces of Freedom and Change; Sudanese resistance committees; Sudanese Professionals Association	Sudanese Armed Forces; Rapid Support Forces

Commanders and leaders
Abdalla Hamdok; Ibrahim al-Sheikh; Ayman Khalid; Hamza Baloul; Mohamed al-Faki; Faisal Saleh	Abdel Fattah al-Burhan; Shams al-Din Kabbashi; Yasser al-Atta; Ibrahim Jabir Karim; Hemedti; Abdul Rahim Dagalo

Casualties and losses
- 62 civilians killed, 140+ wounded during anti-coup protests
- Location within Sudan

On 25 October 2021, the Sudanese military, led by General Abdel Fattah al-Burhan, took control of the Government of Sudan in a military coup. At least five senior government figures were initially detained. Civilian Prime Minister Abdalla Hamdok refused to declare support for the coup and on 25 October called for popular resistance; he was confined to house arrest on 26 October. Internet outages were reported. Later the same day, the Sovereignty Council was dissolved, a state of emergency was put in place, and a majority of the Hamdok Cabinet and a number of pro-government supporters were arrested. As of 5 November 2021, the list of those detained included "government ministers, members of political parties, lawyers, civil society activists, journalists, human rights defenders, and protest leaders", who were held in secret locations, without access to their families or lawyers.

Key civilian groups including the Sudanese Professionals Association and Forces of Freedom and Change called for civil disobedience and refusal to cooperate with the coup organisers. Protests started on 25 and 26 October against the coup and at least 10 civilians were reported as being killed and over 140 injured by the military during the first day of protests. Protests and strikes continued, with 200,000 to 2,000,000 protestors participating around Sudan on 30 October and 15 shot dead by security forces in protests organised by the Sudanese resistance committees on 17 November.

The Ministry of Foreign Affairs, the Ministry of Information and the Prime Minister's Office refused to recognise the transfer of power, stating that the coup was a crime and that Hamdok remained prime minister. On 26 October, the African Union suspended Sudan's membership, pending a return to power of the Hamdok government. On 27 October, the European Union, the United States and other western powers stated that they continued to recognise the Hamdok cabinet as "the constitutional leaders of the transitional government" and insisted on their ambassadors having access to Hamdok.

Faced with internal and international resistance, al-Burhan declared his willingness to restore the Hamdok Cabinet on 28 October, although the deposed Prime Minister declined this initial offer, making any further dialogue conditional on the full restoration of the pre-coup system. On 21 November 2021, Hamdok and al-Burhan signed a 14-point deal that reinstated Hamdok as prime minister and stated that all political prisoners would be freed. Civilian groups including Forces for Freedom and Change and the Sudanese Professionals Association rejected the deal, refusing continued power-sharing with the military. Hamdok resigned on 2 January 2022 amid continuing protests.

== Background ==
=== 2019 coup and revolution ===
President Omar al-Bashir, who had ruled the country since the 1989 coup, was overthrown by the military in April 2019 after weeks of mass protests, with the Transitional Military Council (TMC) taking power. Protests continued for some months. The Khartoum massacre took place in June. The protestors represented by the Forces of Freedom and Change (FFC) agreed to a power-sharing deal with the military, creating the Sovereignty Council in August 2019 and the Abdalla Hamdok government in November 2019. According to the TMC–FFC agreement, the transition process would last three years and three months. The Sovereignty Council was to be led by a military figure for 21 months, followed by a civilian leader for 18 months. The handover was planned to take place in November 2021.

=== September coup attempt ===
In September 2021, a military coup attempt was thwarted by the government. According to the Minister of Information, the perpetrators were "remnants of the former regime" who tried to take control of the state broadcasters television buildings and the military central command. Following the incident, 40 officers were arrested. Since then, tensions between the military and civilian leaders rose as military leaders started demanding reforms to the FFC coalition and called for the replacement of the cabinet.

=== October 2021 pre-coup protests ===
On 16 October, pro-military protests organized by the Charter of the National Accord were held in Khartoum, during which protestors demanded a military coup. They were allowed to reach the gates of the presidential palace with a negligible police presence. They called for General Abdel Fattah al-Burhan, chair of the Sovereignty Council, to seize control and take over the country. The pro-military protesters continued their sit-in outside the presidential palace in Khartoum through to 21 October.

On 21 October, hundreds of thousands of pro-civilian protestors in cities around Sudan including Khartoum, Omdurman, Port Sudan and Atbara took to the streets in support of the civilian government. Following the demonstrations, Ibrahim al-Sheikh, a senior member of FFC, called on al-Burhan to resign, arguing that al-Burhan had ordered the use of force against a sit-in by protestors despite having promised not to. FFC had five issues of disagreement with military leaders: security reform, commercial activities by the military, forming a constitutional court, appointing an attorney-general and chief justice, and the transfer of the Chair of the Sovereignty Council to a civilian.

On 24 October, pro-military protesters blocked some roads and bridges in Khartoum. Security forces used tear gas to disperse the crowds.

==== Negotiations and coup proposal ====
Sudanese prime minister Abdalla Hamdok tried negotiating between civilian and military groups following the September coup attempt.

On 26 November, General Hemedti stated in an Al Jazeera English interview that during the negotiations, both Hamdok and the military had made proposals, and that Hamdok had been aware of the plan for the coup that was later implemented. Hemedti stated, "What happened on October 25 was the ultimate outcome of a long process. Many discussions were made, and many initiatives proposed. ... We were left with three options, the best of which was the move we took, and it was completely agreeable to the prime minister himself. We did not make such a move on our own." Hamdok had earlier denied being aware of the plans for a military coup.

== Events ==
=== Coup takes place and government dissolved ===
Around dawn on 25 October 2021, Sudan's military arrested at least five senior Sudanese government figures. Later, internet outages across Sudan were reported.

According to a Reuters witness, members of the Rapid Support Forces were stationed on the streets of Khartoum during the time of the coup.

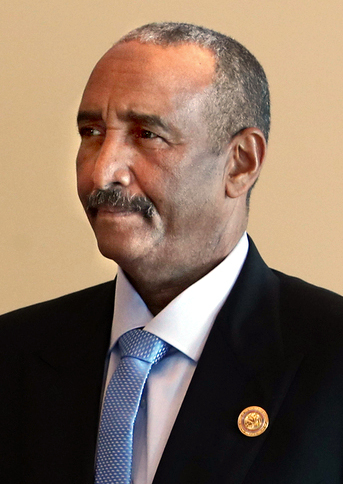
General Abdel Fattah al-Burhan

Later that day, Abdel Fattah al-Burhan declared a state of emergency and announced the dissolution of the government and the Sovereignty Council. In a televised address, he stated that a new technocratic government would lead the country until the next elections, to be held in July 2023. A day after the coup, al-Burhan said that his actions were justified to avoid a civil war in Sudan. He stated that the armed forces had had no option apart from arresting politicians who were allegedly carrying out "incitement" against the military. Al-Burhan denied that he had carried out a coup d'état, but was rather "trying to rectify the path of the transition".

According to Sudan Tribune, al-Burhan replaced "state governors, undersecretaries in the federal ministries, banks and public agencies directors" by members of the National Congress Party that held power under former president Omar al-Bashir.

=== Arrests of government members ===
Military forces placed civilian Prime Minister Abdallah Hamdok under house arrest after besieging his home. Hamdok was pressured to make a statement supporting the coup, which he refused. He called for Sudanese to resist the coup and "defend their revolution". In response to his refusal to support the coup, Hamdok was moved with his wife on 25 October to an unknown location. On 26 October, al-Burhan said that Hamdok was being detained in al-Burhan's own home to protect Hamdok from "danger".

On 25 October, Industry Minister Ibrahim al-Sheikh, the governor of Khartoum, Ayman Khalid and Information Minister Hamza Baloul were also taken into custody. Also arrested was a member of the ruling Sovereignty Council, Mohammed al-Fiky Suliman, and Faisal Mohammed Saleh, a media adviser to the prime minister. As of 25 October 2021, the location of the detainees is unknown. Witness reports stated that the military had been deployed across the capital, restricting the movement of civilians. International flights were suspended after the closure of Khartoum airport.

=== Resistance to the coup, arrests, and killings of civilians ===
The coup was met with resistance from pro-democracy Sudanese civilians, some of whom took to the streets of Khartoum in protest. The Sudanese Professionals Association and FFC, two of the coalitions that coordinated the Sudanese Revolution, called for mass civil disobedience and refusal to cooperate with the coup. The National Umma Party similarly denounced the arrests of the government ministers and called on the public to protest in the streets. The Sudanese Communist Party advocated for a workers' strike and mass civil disobedience.

Following the arrest of the prime minister and civilian leaders, demonstrators started gathering in the streets of Khartoum, lighting car tires and setting up roadblocks. Chants by the protestors included "the people are stronger", "retreat [to military rule] is impossible", "We are revolutionaries. We are free. We will complete the journey." A number of schools, banks and businesses were closed.

Some gunfire around Khartoum occurred throughout 25 October. According to the Information Ministry, the army used live rounds to disperse the protesters in the 25 October protests. Military forces tried to remove protestors' barricades and attacked civilians. The Central Committee of Sudanese Doctors reports that soldiers fired on protestors outside the Sudanese army headquarters in Khartoum, killing at least three people and injuring more than 80 people. Seven civilians were killed and over 140 injured during the protests. Military forces as well as gangs of thugs in plainclothes beat demonstrators in the street, with some being severely injured, and others being injured by cars driven into demonstrators. Medical personnel in Khartoum reported rebuffing demands from gun-wielding soldiers to hand over wounded demonstrators to them. Security forces conducted house-to-house arrests of protest organizers. The Socialist Doctors' Association stated that the Royal Care hospital near army headquarters was in "urgent need of blood". Three hundred protestors were arrested.

Plans for continued protests called the "Revolutionary Escalation Schedule" were published by the Joint Chamber of the Marches of the Millions for Civilian rule and Democratic Transition. The plans included vigils on highways and in front of government buildings and embassies, nightly marches starting on 29 October and mass protests on 30 October throughout Sudan, calling for a full transfer of power to civilians.

Protests continued on 26 October, with protestors chanting slogans, blocking roads and burning tyres. There was civil disobedience, and schools, shops and petrol stations were closed in Geneina. Protests outside of the capital took place in Omdurman, Atbara, Dongola, El Obeid, Port Sudan, Gezira, and Red Sea State. Protests continued on 27 October in Khartoum and Atbara. "Most government and educational institutions were in complete paralysis" and travel between Khartoum and the states of Sudan had mostly stopped. Security forces used live fire while trying to remove protestors' road blocks in Khartoum. Demonstrations became large in Khartoum in the evening. Mass protests and strikes continued during 28 and 29 October.

On 30 October, mass protests called "Marches of the Millions" took place around Sudan against the coup. Notwithstanding the difficulties of compiling the actual numbers during the ongoing Internet and telecommunications blackout, The Guardian estimated the numbers as "hundreds of thousands", and Mada Masr spoke of "millions". Security forces used teargas and live bullets against protestors and set up barbed wire barricades. Protestors' chants included "No, not to military rule" and called for al-Burhan to be arrested and held in Kobar Prison. Protestors held pictures of al-Burhan and Mohamed Hamdan Dagalo (Hemedti) covered in red. Three unarmed protestors were shot dead outside the parliament building in Omdurman, one dying from a chest wound in hospital. Injuries sustained by protestors included head and neck gunshot wounds and trauma from beatings with batons. Treatment for tear gas exposure was needed. One protestor was run over by a military vehicle. Protestors carried banners in support of Hamdok and criticising Egyptian president Abdel Fattah el-Sisi. Protestors held signs stating, "the Emirates will not govern us, nor the implementation of Sisi."

On 31 October, security forces assaulted protestors, forcing them to dismantle street barricades. The protestors rebuilt the barricades. Governmental and educational institutions, banks and shops remained closed. The resistance committees, the Sudanese Bankers Association, the Bank of Khartoum and the Democratic Lawyers Alliance called for continued strikes and civil disobedience.

On 4 November, three FFC members, Taha Osman, Hamza Farouk and Sharif Mohamed Osman, were arrested shortly after they met with Volker Perthes, head of United Nations Integrated Transition Assistance Mission in Sudan (UNITAMS). On 5 November, the list of those detained included "government ministers, members of political parties, lawyers, civil society activists, journalists, human rights defenders, and protest leaders", and the detainees were held in unknown locations, without access to their lawyers or families, according to Michelle Bachelet, the United Nations High Commissioner for Human Rights.

On 17 November, mass protests organised by the Sudanese resistance committees took place across Sudan, including Khartoum, Wad Madani, Atbara, El Fasher and Port Sudan. Fifteen protestors were shot dead by the security forces, who raided hospitals and fired tear gas to block medical treatment of wounded survivors. The Guardian described the killings as the "deadliest security clampdown to date" and described the "cycle of demonstration and use of lethal force in response" as similar to the early 2019 phase of the Sudan Revolution. Resistance committee members stated that they were consulting each other "about upping the escalation against the coup". Chief of Police Khalid Mahdi Ibrahim stated that the police had not used firearms and was investigating the shootings. Euro-Mediterranean Human Rights Monitor described Ibrahim's comments as being part of a "framework of the de facto authority's policy of falsifying the facts" since the coup.

=== Internet outages ===
Following the coup, Internet outages in Sudan were reported by international watchdog groups including NetBlocks. The outages were later corroborated by the Sudan Information Ministry. The Sudanese Journalists Network interpreted the reason for the Internet and telecommunications cutoffs to be the security forces' aim of "commit[ting] more crimes against the Sudanese" and hiding evidence of the security forces' involvement in attacks including the 3 June 2019 Khartoum massacre. On 9 November, a judge in a Khartoum court ordered the country's major providers (MTN, Zain, and Sudani) to restore Internet services immediately.

=== Media ===
Government-owned state television operated uninterrupted.

=== Government ministries and embassies ===
Mariam al-Mahdi, Minister of Foreign Affairs rejected the coup, stating that "any coup in the country is rejected" and that the Sudanese would "resist [the coup] by all civil means." She described the arrest of Hamdok as "very dangerous and unacceptable". On 26 October, the Ministry of Foreign Affairs supported al-Mahdi's earlier statement and al-Mahdi spoke directly to the Associated Press, stating "We are still in our positions. We reject such coup and such unconstitutional measures."

On 25 October, the Ministry of Information declared that Hamdok was "still the legitimate transitional authority in the country" and called for the "immediate release of the prime minister and all detained officials." The Ministry also stated that "all unilateral measures and decisions taken by the military component lack any constitutional basis, violate the law, and are considered a crime."

On 26 October, the Prime Minister's office called for Hamdok's release from house arrest, stated that he continued to be "the executive authority recognized by the Sudanese people and the world," and called for civil disobedience and the release of the other government members.

On 30 October, the Hamdok Cabinet published a statement declaring that the military forces "[would] not find free Sudanese or true democratic revolutionary forces to be their partners in power."

The Sudanese ambassadors to France, Belgium and Switzerland stated their opposition to the coup and alignment with the civilian protestors. They stated, "We completely align ourselves with the heroic opposition [to the coup] followed by the entire world" and that their embassies represented "the Sudanese people and their revolution." The Sudanese ambassadors to China, South Africa, Qatar, Kuwait and United Arab Emirates also signed the statement. As of 28 October 2021, 42 Sudanese ambassadors and 21 other Sudanese diplomats had signed the statement. Al-Burhan issued a decree stating that five ambassadors (to France, Switzerland, Belgium and the European Union, China and Qatar) were sacked.

=== Negotiations and mediation ===
On 27 October, al-Burhan met with Volker Perthes, United Nations Special Representative and head of the United Nations Integrated Transition Assistance Mission in Sudan (UNITAMS), in Khartoum. The army media office described the meeting as aiming to find "ways to get out of the crisis in order to achieve stability and peace in the country," while Perthes referred to "return[ing] to a comprehensive and urgent dialogue to restore partnership on the basis of the Constitutional Document and the Juba Peace Agreement." The following day, al-Burhan made a radio announcement declaring that Hamdok would be allowed to be restored as Prime Minister with a cabinet of his choosing, and the deposed official declined this initial offer, stating that he would only return to lead the government if the pre-coup system be restored. Al-Burhan responded by also proposing a new government led by an independent technocrat. Some observers judged that despite local and international efforts to mediate between al-Burhan's forces and civilian groups, there was little progress, as large sections of the Sudanese public appeared to be no longer willing to return to the pre-coup power-sharing system.

Perthes spoke with Mohamed Hamdan Dagalo (Hemedti), deputy head of the Sovereignty Council of Sudan under the pre-coup transitional arrangements, on 29 October. Egyptian representatives contacted both al-Burhan and Hemedti.

=== Reinstatement of Prime Minister ===
On 21 November 2021, Hamdok was reinstated as prime minister after a political agreement was signed by Sudan's top general Abdel Fattah al-Burhan to restore the transition to civilian rule. The 14-point deal called for the release of all political prisoners detained during the coup and stipulated that a 2019 constitutional declaration be the basis for a political transition. However, the Forces of Freedom and Change (FFC) civilian coalition, which shared power with the military, and the Sudanese Professionals Association (SPA) both rejected the political deal. Large crowds of protestors also took to the streets to reject any deal involving the military.

On 11 December 2021, Perthes briefed the UN-Security Council on the current situation in Sudan after Hamdok had been reinstated. In his report and analysis, he made the following remarks:

Sudan’s military and political leaders will primarily have to rebuild trust with their own domestic public, particularly with the young generation. Immediate confidence-building measures and a visible commitment to bring the country back on a democratic transition path will be key. Similarly, Sudanese authorities will need to take demonstrable steps to regain financial, economic, and political support from the international community.

— Volker Perthes, Security Council briefing on the UN Integrated Transition Assistance Mission in Sudan

Hamdok later resigned in January 2022 after two people were killed in further pro-democracy protests.

== Legal issues ==
On 29 October, 27 lawyers and twelve citizens' groups including the Sudan Doctors Syndicate, the General Banks Union, the Darfur Bar Association, the Nuba Mountains Bar Association, the Women Lawyers Initiative for Change, the No to Oppression against Women Initiative, Women of Sudanese Civic and Political Groups (MANSAM) and the Khatim Adlan Centre for Enlightenment (KACE) called for al-Burhan to respect the draft constitutional document. In their view, the declaration of a state of emergency by al-Burhan, either in his role as the Sovereignty Council chair or as Commander-in-Chief of the Sudanese Armed forces, was illegal, and the suspension of Articles 11, 12, 15, 16 and 24, and items 3, 71 and 72 of the constitutional document was illegal.

== Analysis ==
According to The New York Times, factors motivating the military to halt the transition to democracy included their personal risk of national or international war crimes charges and their risk of losing control of the gold trade.

Jonas Horner of the International Crisis Group predicted strong civilian resistance to the coup and judged that the military had underestimated the likely strength of civil disobedience. He stated that the military "[had not] learned their lesson. As we saw post the revolution and post-Bashir, the streets were determined and civilians were willing to die for this."

Alex de Waal, researcher in African politics and executive director of the World Peace Foundation, saw multiple reasons motivating al-Burhan and Mohamed Hamdan Dagalo (Hemedti) to carry out the coup. Under rule 10.(c) of the 39-month transition to democracy agreed between military and civilians in 2019, the Chair of the Sovereignty Council of Sudan should be transferred to a civilian selected by the FFC civilian members of the Sovereignty Council in November 2021, leading to certain risks for al-Burhan and Hemedti. Al-Burhan and Hemedti would risk being implicated as perpetrators in the expected International Criminal Court trial of former Sudanese president Omar al-Bashir for war crimes, crimes against humanity and genocide. They would also risk being charged in the Khartoum massacre investigation led by Nabil Adib into the 3 June 2019 Khartoum massacre.

In de Waal's view, after the transfer of the Sovereignty Council Chair to a civilian, al-Burhan and Hemedti would risk loss of military control of the national budget. They would also risk being affected by the Commission for Dismantling the 30 June 1989 Regime, Removal of Empowerment and Corruption, and Recovering Public Funds that could expose and disrupt military-owned commercial interests. De Waal also listed a shift to civilian control of the military in the second phase of the transition period as a concern for the two generals. De Waal described the coup as a "gamble" offering no practical solutions and risking "turmoil and bloodshed at home and pariah status abroad".

Oscar Rickett, writing in Middle East Eye, argued that Hemedti was a key person in the coup, with "Hemetti's troops [out] on the streets killing and injuring civilians" while Hemedti himself had "hardly been seen," "lurking in the background," Hemedti was seen by "smarter diplomats" and street protestors as backing the coup, but waiting to see how the situation developed, as in 2019, when he switched from defending president Omar al-Bashir to arresting him. Both al-Burhan and Hemedti had been "fierce, reliable lieutenants" of al-Bashir when he was in power. Both had "plundered the resources of Sudan for decades" according to Rickett. As of October 2021, in Rickett's view, al-Burhan, trained in Cairo, is mostly supported by Egypt, while Hemedti and his brothers, owning gold mines and providing mercenaries for the Saudi war in Yemen, are mostly supported by the United Arab Emirates (UAE) and Saudi Arabia. According to Rickett, both al-Burhan and Hemedti "had to" carry out the coup to preserve their "sources of power and wealth" and prevent being investigated or charged for war crimes by the International Criminal Court investigation in Darfur. Nesrine Malik expressed concern that a massacre like the Egyptian August 2013 Rabaa massacre could take place if Hemedti replaced al-Burhan. Rickett described Hemedti as "know[ing] that he is repellent to the Sudanese out on the streets" and "that the coup is stumbling and that the people are holding firm," and waiting to make a decision on how to act.

In an analysis on Eurasia Review, James M. Dorsey wrote that the Abu Dhabi Crown Prince Mohammed bin Zayed and the UAE Deputy Prime Minister Mansour bin Zayed Al Nahyan had supported the grassroots opposition and rebel groups after the ousting al-Bashir in 2019. A former Sudanese intelligence head based in Abu Dhabi, General Abdel Ghaffar al-Sharif, also allegedly helped Sheikh Mansour in the background. The UAE and Saudi Arabia had pledged $3 billion in aid after the deposal of al-Bashir, and in return, the Sudanese military leaders and the RSF had deployed their military personnel alongside the forces of the UAE and Saudi Arabia in Libya and Yemen. Dorsey wrote that by October 2021, the existence of the UAE-supported components of the Sudanese military led the UAE to favour the coup, and oppose Hamdok, who the UAE saw as "a thorn in the side of the armed forces." The former finance minister of Sudan, Ibrahim al-Badawi, had also claimed that state revenues from meat exports to Saudi Arabia had been diverted to military funds and that a Swiss-based firm had collected the income of the civil aviation authorities and transferred it to an Emirati bank account. The UAE was active in encouraging Sudan to recognize Israel, after the Emirates signed the Abraham Accords. The UAE organized a secret meeting between the Israeli Prime Minister Benjamin Netanyahu and Sudan's General al-Burhan in early 2020, according to Middle East Eye, in which Prime Minister Abdallah Hamdok was absent.

== International reactions ==
- Chinese foreign ministry spokesman Wang Wenbin on Monday said Beijing called on "relevant parties in Sudan to resolve differences through dialogue and maintain national peace and stability." "China will closely follow the developments and take necessary measures to ensure the safety and security of Chinese institutions and people in Sudan," Wang said.
- Egypt "urged all parties to work to ensure 'stability and security'" and to "give priority to the higher interest of the country and national consensus."
- Saudi Arabia called for "restraint" and for "Sudanese factions to unify and 'preserve the political and economic gains that [had] been achieved."
- The United Arab Emirates called for "stability."
- Bahrain expressed "confidence" that Sudanese would "overcome the crisis through dialogue and understanding."
- Russia stated that "outside powers" had interfered in Sudan. Foreign Minister Sergey Lavrov said that the coup "appeared to be rooted in the shortcomings of the transitional government."

=== Opposition to the coup ===
==== States and intergovernmental organizations ====
The coup, as well as the killings of civilian protestors, was denounced by some members of the international community.

- The United States condemned the coup and called upon the Sudanese military to immediately release the civilian officials, halt violence against protestors, and restore the transitional government. President Biden condemned the actions of the military and demanded the restoration of the civilian government, stating "Together, our message to Sudan's military authorities is overwhelming and clear: The Sudanese people must be allowed to protest peacefully, and the civilian-led transitional government must be restored." The US froze $700 million in economic aid to Sudan's government. The coup was also condemned by the governments of France, Germany, and the United Kingdom.
- French President Emmanuel Macron condemned the coup attempt in Sudan and called for the immediate release of the Sudanese Prime Minister and civilian members of the government. “France condemns in the strongest terms the attempted coup d’état," he said, adding that France supports the transitional government that had been tasked with steering Sudan towards democratic elections.
- (United Kingdom) Foreign Office minister Vicky Ford condemned the coup, saying "The acts of the military today represent an unacceptable betrayal of the Sudanese people and their journey to democracy."

The United Nations (UN) Security Council met in an emergency session to discuss the unfolding crisis in Sudan. But the five permanent members failed to agree on a joint statement after China and Russia refused to threaten sanctions against the coup leaders, should they refuse to comply with demands aimed at de-escalating the situation. "All states have their own interests and ideas about Sudan," Volker Perthes, the Special Representative of the UN Secretary-General for Sudan, told German broadcaster Deutschlandfunk."Yesterday, we saw that the analysis of, for example, Russia on the one hand and the US and Western states on the other hand, are still far apart," Perthes said.

- European Union: The European Union foreign affairs chief Josep Borrell and Secretary General of the Arab League Ahmed Aboul Gheit expressed concern. Borrell called for "the security forces to immediately release those they have unlawfully detained."
- United Nations: United Nations Secretary-General António Guterres condemned the coup, calling for the prime minister to be released. He added that the UN would "continue to stand" with the Sudanese people and that "there must be full respect for the constitutional charter to protect the hard-won political transition." Volker Perthes, the Special Representative of the Secretary-General of the United Nations (SRSG) for Sudan and the African Union (AU) issued similar statements.
- African Union: On 26 October, the African Union suspended Sudan's membership. The condition for restoring full membership of the AU is "the effective restoration" of the transitional government.

The World Bank suspended its aid to Sudan following the military coup.

On 27 October, representatives of the European Union, Norway, Switzerland, the United States and the United Kingdom declared that their countries "continue to recognize the Prime Minister Hamdok and his cabinet as the constitutional leaders of the transitional government." They stated that the ambassadors in Khartoum had to be given access to communicate with and visit Hamdok and called for the political detainees to be released.

==== Citizens' associations ====
Edmund Yakani, leader of Community Empowerment for Progress Organization, a South Sudanese NGO, condemned the arrest of Hamdok. He said that the arrest of Hamdok, the chair of the Intergovernmental Authority on Development (IGAD), an eight-country regional trade bloc, was "the first time in the continent that a sitting chair of a regional economic body like IGAD [was] under detention." Yakani stated that Hamdok's arrest put at risk both the Sudanese peace process and the South Sudanese peace process, in which each country provided mediation for the other country's internal conflicts.

== See also ==
- The Spider-Man of Sudan, a 2022 documentary film about the coup
