= The Spider-Man of Sudan =

2022 documentary film

- Directed by: Phil Cox; Rafa Renas
- Written by: Phil Cox
- Produced by: Giovanni Stopponi
- Cinematography: Phil Cox
- Edited by: Esteban Uyarra; Tracy McVeigh
- Music by: James Preston
- Production companies: Native Voice Films; Pulitzer Center; The Guardian
- Release date: 17 May 2022
- Running time: 19 minutes
- Languages: Arabic; English

The 'Spider-Man' of Sudan is a 2022 documentary short film directed by Phil Cox and Rafa Renas. The film follows an unidentified Sudanese man who protested while dressed as the Marvel Comics superhero Spider-Man during the 2021 coup d'état. The name of the man was kept anonymous due to concerns for his safety.

== Synopsis ==
External video
- The 'Spider-Man' of Sudan, from YouTube

During the October 2021 military coup in Sudan, photos of a protester dressed as Spider-Man went viral on social media. The man explains his reasoning for dressing up as the superhero, saying he wanted to inspire hope in other protesters, and as a way to honour a childhood friend killed by the regime. He also says he took inspiration from a story about the Islamic prophet Mohammad, who was protected by a spiders web to hide him from his pursuers.

The documentary shows him helping members of his community, joining in protests, and discussing with others how to stop the military from overturning the 2018–2019 revolution.

== Critical reception ==
The 'Spider-Man' of Sudan won the Bayeux Calvados-Normandy Award in 2022, Hinzpeter Award in 2023, and was one of the finalist of the One World Media Awards in 2023.

== See also ==
- Cinema of Sudan
- Photography in Sudan
