= Ibrahim Jaber =

Sudanese army officer

Vice Admiral Ibrahim Jaber
- إبراهيم جابر

Member of the Transitional Sovereignty Council
- Incumbent
- Assumed office 21 August 2019
- Prime Minister: Abdalla Hamdok; Osman Hussein (acting); Dafallah al-Haj Ali (acting); Kamil Idris
- Chairman: Abdel Fattah al-Burhan

Member of the Transitional Military Council
- In office 11 April 2019 – 21 August 2019
- Prime Minister: Abdalla Hamdok
- Chairman: Abdel Fattah al-Burhan

Military service
- Allegiance: Sudan
- Branch/service: Sudanese Navy
- Rank: Vice Admiral
- Battles/wars: 2023 War in Sudan

Ibrahim Jaber Karim (Arabic: إبراهيم جابر كريم) is the Assistant Commander-in-Chief of the Sudanese Armed Forces with the rank of Admiral since May 2023. He is also the Chairman of the Board of Directors of "Sudatel Group for Communications", and a member of the "Sudanese Sovereignty Council" since 21 August 2019. He participated in the establishment of the "Transitional Military Council" in 2019, and was a member of it as well as the head of the council's economic committee.

Jabir joined the Navy in 1988 and held several positions there, including Director of the Training Department, Director of the Technical Department, Military Attaché in Southeast Asia between 2007 and 2015, and Deputy Chief of Staff of the Naval Forces for Logistics and Engineering between 2015 and 2019. He holds a Master's degree in Industrial Planning from University of Putra Malaysia, and a Bachelor's degree in Mechanical Engineering in 1987 from the University of Khartoum.
