= Siddiq Tawer =

Sudanese physicist and politician (born 1959)

- صديق تاور

Member of the Sovereignty Council of Sudan
- In office 21 August 2019 – 25 October 2021
- Prime Minister: Abdalla Hamdok
- Preceded by: Abdel Fattah al-Burhan (as Chairman of the Transitional Military Council and head of state)

Personal details
- Born: 1959 (age 66–67)
- Party: Arab Socialist Ba'ath Party – Region of Sudan
- Occupation: physicist

Siddiq Tawer Kafi (Arabic: صديق تاور, also: Siddig, Tower, Sadeek, born 1959) is a physicist and member of the Arab Socialist Ba'ath Party – Region of Sudan who was a member of the Sovereignty Council of Sudan from 21 August 2019 to 25 October 2021.

== Biography ==
Tawer was born in 1959 in Kadugli, South Kordofan.

Tawer is a physicist who has taught at several Sudanese universities.

Tawer is a member of the Arab Socialist Ba'ath Party – Region of Sudan.

On 21 August 2019, Tawer became one of the civilian members of the joint civilian–military transitionary head of state of Sudan called the Sovereignty Council of Sudan. After his nomination, Tawer's membership of the Ba'ath Party "sparked a debate" according to Asharq al-Awsat, which Tawer attributed to "the state" and to the Sudan People's Liberation Movement.

On 8 November 2019, Tawer confirmed Prime Minister Abdalla Hamdok's earlier statement that former president and International Criminal Court (ICC) indictee Omar al-Bashir would be surrendered to the ICC after the completion of his Sudanese court cases.
