= Edmund Yakani =

South Sudanese human rights advocate

- Born: South Sudan
- Education: University of Juba
- Occupations: Human rights advocate, civil society activist
- Organization: Community Empowerment for Progress Organization (CEPO)
- Known for: Human rights advocacy, peacebuilding, civil society leadership
- Notable work: Executive Director of CEPO
- Awards: Civil Rights Defender of the Year Award (2017)

Edmund Yakani is a South Sudanese civil society and human rights activist. He is the executive director of the Community Empowerment for Progress Organization in Juba.
