= Jubayt =

Jubayt جبيت
- Town
- Location in Sudan
- Coordinates: 18°57′18″N 36°49′59″E
- Country: Sudan
- State: Red Sea
- Elevation: 2,621 ft (799 m)
- Time zone: UTC+02:00 (CAT)

Jubayt or Gebeit (Arabic: جبيت) is a small town in eastern Sudan.

== History ==
Gold mining of quartz veins in the area dates from the New Kingdom of Egypt Period. A large New Kingdom settlement is located northeast of the main Gebeit mine in Wadi Gebeir-Shariq, which includes 15 buildings, and numerous oval grinding mills and anvil stones. Mining was resumed under the British in 1903, after an evaluation by the Royal Geographical Society in 1896. Total gold production when operations ceased in 1956 was about 4,200 kg from 63.5 grams per ton (g/t) ore. Then, the British Minex Mineral (Sudan) operated for a time until 1990. Some archaic extraction of ore was still underway in the 2000s by miners living in the makeshift village.

Gebeit was the location of an attempted assassination of Abdel Fattah al-Burhan in which five people were killed at a military graduation ceremony.

== Transport ==
It is served by a station on the mainline of the Sudan railway network.

== See also ==
- Arabian-Nubian Shield
- Railway stations in Sudan
