= Osman Hussein =

Acting Prime Minister of Sudan (2022–2025)

- عثمان حسين

Prime Minister of Sudan
- Acting
- In office 19 January 2022 – 30 April 2025
- President: Transitional Sovereignty Council
- Preceded by: Abdalla Hamdok
- Succeeded by: Dafallah al-Haj Ali (acting)

General Secretary of the Prime Minister's Office
- In office 13 March 2019 – 19 January 2022
- President: Omar al-Bashir; Ahmed Awad Ibn Auf; Abdel Fattah al-Burhan
- Prime Minister: Mohamed Tahir Ayala; Abdalla Hamdok

Personal details
- Born: 1951 (age 74–75) Sudan
- Party: National Congress Party (until 2019)

Osman Hussein (Arabic: عثمان حسين, romanized: ʻUthmān Ḥusayn; born 1951) is a Sudanese politician who served as acting prime minister of Sudan between 19 January 2022 and 30 April 2025.

== Biography ==
Before becoming prime minister, he served as Secretary-General of the Prime Minister's Office from 13 March 2019 until his promotion to Minister for Cabinet Affairs on 19 January 2022, a post he holds concurrently with his duties as acting prime ministerHe is said to be close to the leaders of the ousted National Congress Party.

=== Prime Minister of Sudan ===
He was appointed Prime Minister on 19 January 2022 by the de facto head of state , Abdel Fattah al-Burhan, replacing Abdalla Hamdok, who resigned on 2 January due to his inability to form a civilian government

== See also ==
- Osman Hussein government
