= Next Sudanese general election =

Presidency before election
Abdel Fattah al-Burhan
Independent
Elected President
TBD

Several Sudanese election plans followed the Sudanese Revolution of 2019, starting with a plan to hold elections in July 2023 under the 2019 Draft Constitutional Declaration. The December 2022 "Framework Agreement" between civilian and military groups in Sudan scheduled a two-year transition to be followed by elections. However, since 15 April 2023, plans for an election have been stalled due to the ongoing civil war and several factions opposing elections.

== Election plans ==
=== 2019 transition to democracy plan ===
Under the 2019 Draft Constitutional Declaration that was signed as a step of the Sudanese Revolution, general elections were scheduled to be held in Sudan in July 2023. A constitutional convention was scheduled to be held before the end of the transitional period to draft a permanent constitution for defining the form of government and electoral system.

==== Constitutional ineligibility constraint ====
Article 19 of the August 2019 Draft Constitutional Declaration forbids "the chairman and members of the Sovereignty Council and ministers, governors of provinces, or heads of regions" from running "in the public elections" planned for late 2022. Article 38.(c)(iv) of the declaration states that the chair and members of the Elections Commission are to be appointed by the Sovereignty Council in consultation with the Cabinet.

=== October 2021 coup ===
A coup was launched by military forces on October 24, 2021, which resulted in the arrests of at least five senior Sudanese government figures. Widespread Internet outages were also reported. Abdalla Hamdok, the Prime Minister, was among those who were arrested and was held in an undisclosed location.

On 21 November 2021, Hamdok, and all those that were arrested in the October coup were freed as Hamdok was reinstated as Prime Minister as part of an agreement with the civilian political parties. The agreement also allowed Hamdok to lead the transitional government.

On 4 December 2021, General Abdel Fattah al-Burhan who led the coup, told Reuters in an interview that the Sudanese military will "exit politics" following the elections stating, "When a government is elected, I don't think the army, the armed forces, or any of the security forces will participate in politics. This is what we agreed on and this is the natural situation."

On 2 January 2022, Hamdok resigned as Prime Minister following violent protests in Khartoum that left fifty-seven people dead. The military assumed full control of the transition process. Hamdok, in a televised address, stated he had tried his best to stop the country from "sliding towards disaster" and "despite everything that has been done to reach a consensus... it has not happened."

=== December 2022 Framework Agreement ===
In a new "Framework Agreement" signed by forty civilian groups, al-Burhan and Hemetti on 5 December 2022, elections following a two-year transition to a civilian government were planned.
