= Transitional Sovereignty Council =

Collective head of state of Sudan since 2019

- مجلس السيادة الإنتقالي (Arabic)
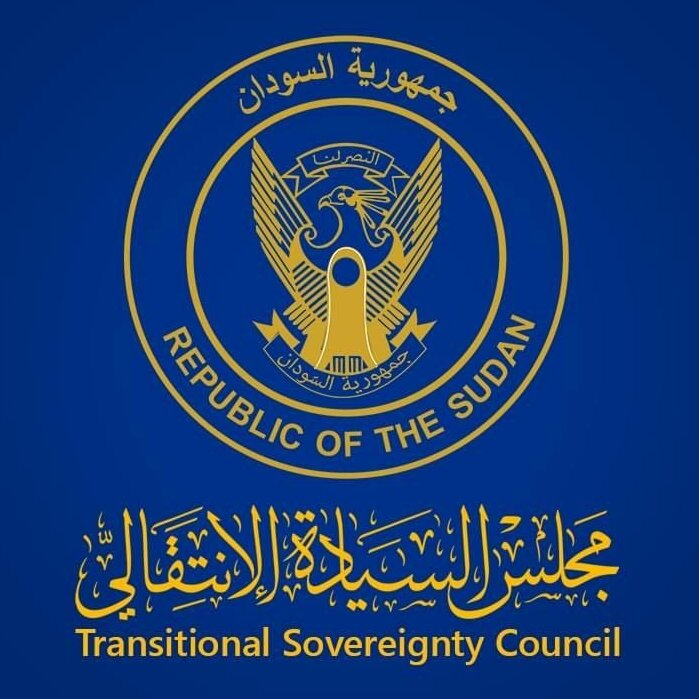

Overview
- Established: 21 August 2019 (first) 11 November 2021 (current)
- Dissolved: 25 October 2021 (first)
- State: Sudan
- Leader: President (Abdel Fattah al-Burhan); Vice-President (Malik Agar)
- Appointed by: August 2019 Draft Constitutional Declaration (first) Abdel Fattah al-Burhan (current)
- Website: www.presidency.gov.sd/eng/

The Transitional Sovereignty Council (Arabic: مجلس السيادة الإنتقالي, romanized: Majlis al-Siyādah al-Intiqālī) is the internationally recognised collective head of state of Sudan, formed on 21 August 2019, by the August 2019 Draft Constitutional Declaration. The initial council was dissolved by its Chairman Abdel Fattah al-Burhan in the October 2021 Sudanese coup d'état and reconstituted the following month with new membership, effectively changing it from a unity government to a military junta.

Under Article 10.(b) of the Draft Constitutional Declaration, it is composed of five civilians chosen by the Forces of Freedom and Change alliance (FFC), five military representatives chosen by the Transitional Military Council (TMC), and a civilian selected by agreement between the FFC and TMC. The chair for the first 21 months was to be a military member, Abdel Fattah al-Burhan, and for the remaining 18 months the chair was to be a civilian member, under Article 10.(c). The original Sovereignty Council was mostly male, with only two female members: Aisha Musa el-Said and Raja Nicola. Under Article 19 of the Draft Constitutional Declaration, the Sovereignty Council members are ineligible to run in the election scheduled to follow the transition period.

== Background ==
Sudan had multi-member Sovereignty Councils holding the role of head of state of Sudan several times during the twentieth century. Following more than half a year of sustained civil disobedience and a shift of the presidency from Omar al-Bashir to the Transitional Military Council (TMC) in April 2019 by a coup d'état, the TMC and the Forces of Freedom and Change alliance (FFC) made a July 2019 Political Agreement and completed it by the August 2019 Draft Constitutional Declaration. Articles 9.(a) and 10.(a) of the August 2019 Draft Constitutional Declaration both transfer the role of head of state to the Sovereignty Council.

== Structure and membership ==
Article 10.(b) of the Draft Constitutional Declaration defines the Sovereignty Council to consist of five civilians chosen by the FFC, five military chosen by the TMC, and a civilian "selected by agreement" between the FFC and TMC.

Under Article 10.(c) of the Draft Constitutional Declaration, for the first 21 months of the 39-month transitional period defined by the document, the chair of the Sovereignty Council was to be chosen by the five military members of the council. For the following 18 months, the chair was to be chosen by the five civilian members selected by the FFC.

The military membership of the Sovereignty Council included General Abdel Fattah al-Burhan, General Hemedti, Lieutenant-General Yasser al-Atta, General Shams al-Din Khabbashi and Major-General Ibrahim Jabir Karim. Hemedti has been the deputy chairman of the Sovereignty Council in the past.

The five civilians chosen by the FFC are Aisha Musa el-Said of the National Gathering Initiative; Siddiq Tawer, a prominent member of the Arab Socialist Ba'ath Party – Region of Sudan (and thereby a member of the National Consensus Forces) from the Nuba Mountains in South Kordofan; Mohamed al-Faki Suleiman of the Unionist Gathering from Northern Sudan; Hassan Sheikh Idris (or Hassan Mohamed Idris), a prominent member of the National Umma Party (and thereby a member of Sudan Call) from Kassala; and Mohammed Hassan Osman al-Ta'ishi of the Sudanese Professionals Association. Taha Othman Ishaq (or Osman), a lawyer and member of the FFC negotiating committee, declined his nomination by the FFC to the Sovereignty Council on the grounds that the FFC alliance had earlier agreed that members of the negotiating committee should not become members of the Sovereignty Council.

Raja Nicola was the civilian member of the Sovereignty Council mutually chosen by the FFC and TMC. The choice of Nicola, as a member of the Sudanese Copt community, is seen as a symbol of respect for diversity, in particular to Sudanese Christians.

On 4 February 2021, al-Burhan issued a decree to add three new members to the Council. The new members are Sudanese Revolutionary Front leader El Hadi Idris Yahya, Sudan People's Liberation Movement-North leader Malik Agar, and Sudan Liberation Movement for Justice-Karbino leader El Tahrir Abubakr Hajar.

=== List of members ===
==== 2019–2021 ====
The council had fourteen members as follows:

- Abdel Fattah al-Burhan (president)
- Muhammad Hamdan Dagalo (deputy-chair)
- Yasser al-Atta
- Shams al-Din Kabbashi
- Ibrahim Jaber
- Aisha Musa el-Said (Resigned on 12 May 2021)
- Siddiq Tawer
- Mohamed al-Faki
- Hassan Sheikh Idris
- Mohammed Hassan al-Ta'ishi
- Raja Nicola
- El Hadi Idris Yahya (from 7 March 2021)
- Malik Agar (from 7 March 2021)
- El Tahrir Abubakr Hajar (from 7 March 2021)

==== 2021–present ====
Al-Burhan reinstated the TSC on 11 November 2021 with the same military and rebel members, but with all but one of the civilian members replaced. He left the seat for a civilian representative from Eastern Sudan vacant. The members are:

- Abdel Fattah al-Burhan (president)
- Muhammad Hamdan Dagalo (deputy-chair; Removed on 19 May 2023)
- Malik Agar (elevated to deputy-chair in 2023)
- Shams al-Din Kabbashi
- Yasser al-Atta
- Ibrahim Jaber
- El Hadi Idris Yahya (Removed on 3 November 2023)
- El Tahrir Abubakr Hajar (Removed on 20 November 2023)
- Raja Nicola (Removed on 5 July 2022)
- Aboulgasim Mohamed Burtum (Removed on 5 July 2022)
- Yousef Jad Karim (Removed on 5 July 2022)
- Abdul-Baqi Abdul-Qadir Al-Zubair (Removed on 5 July 2022)
- Salma Abdul Jabbar al-Mubarak (Removed on 5 July 2022) reinstated on 31 May 2025
- Salah al-Din Adam Tur (from 17 July 2024)
- Abdullah Yahya Ahmed Hussein (from 20 August 2024)
- Nawara Abu Muhammad Muhammad Taher (from 31 May 2025)

Currently serving members are indicated by bold text.

=== Proposed reform in 2025 ===
Amendments made to the transitional constitution in February 2025, propose to maintain the council as the collective head of state of Sudan, and empower it to appoint a prime minister, cabinet, state governors and justices. The reformed council is to have eleven members, with six nominated by the Sudanese Armed Forces and three from signatories to the peace agreement.

=== Women's participation ===
The Sovereignty Council was mostly male, with two of the eleven members being female: Aisha Musa el-Said and Raja Nicola. At a lower level, Siham Osman was nominated Under-Secretary of the Minister of Justice, and acts on behalf of the Minister of Justice with his authorisation when he is on travels.

The Sudanese Women's Union argued that women had played as significant a role as men in the political changes of 2019 and that Sudanese women "claim an equal share of 50-50 with men at all levels, measured by qualifications and capabilities".

=== Ineligibility in 2022 ===
Under Article 19 of the August 2019 Draft Constitutional Declaration, the eleven members of the Sovereignty Council of the transitional period were forbidden (along with ministers and other senior transition leaders) from running in the 2022 Sudanese general election scheduled to end the transitional period.

== Powers ==
Article 11.(a) lists 17 political powers held by the Sovereignty Council, including the appointment of the Prime Minister, confirmation of leaders of certain state bodies, the right to declare war or a state of emergency, and signing and ratifying national and international agreements.

=== Separation of powers ===
On 24 October, the Sudanese Professionals Association (SPA) claimed that civilian members of the Sovereignty Council violated the constitutional constraints on their power by appearing to coordinate with Rapid Support Forces (RSF) and override the Ministry of Health's role in managing vector control against the spread of dengue fever and chikungunya. The SPA stated, "the campaign appeared to be the scene of direct interaction of the [RSF] with the health situation in the concerned states, in the absence of health departments at the federal or state level. ... [The] whole issue of health is not the prerogative of the Sovereign Council." Sudan Tribune expressed concern that the RSF and its leader Hemedti were trying to improve the RSF's image, damaged by its carrying out of crimes against humanity in the War in Darfur and human rights violations during the 3 June 2019 Khartoum massacre.

== Decision-making ==
Under Article 11.(c) of the Draft Constitutional Declaration, the Sovereignty Council makes decisions either by consensus, or when consensus is not possible, by a two-thirds majority (eight members).

== Actions ==
The Council announced a state of emergency in Port Sudan during tribal clashes which resulted in the death of 16 people on 26 August 2019.

In November 2019, Abdalla Hamdok's government repealed all laws restricting women's freedom of dress, movement, association, work and study. On 22 April 2020, the transitional government issued an amendment to its criminal legislation which declares that anyone who performs female genital mutilation either in a medical establishment or elsewhere will be punished by three years' imprisonment and a fine.

== Dissolution ==
On 25 October 2021, in the 2021 Sudan coup d'état, Chairman Abdel Fattah al-Burhan dissolved the Council and removed Prime Minister Abdalla Hamdok from office. He re-formed the TSC with new membership on November 11, 2021. On November 21, 2021, al-Burhan signed a deal with Hamdok that reinstated him as prime minister, provided for the release of all political prisoners detained in the coup, and restored the 2019 Draft Constitutional Declaration.

== See also ==
- List of heads of state of Sudan
