= Abdel Fattah al-Burhan =

Leader of Sudan since 2019

His Excellency; General; Abdel Fattah al-Burhan
- عَبد الْفَتَّاح الْبُرْهَان
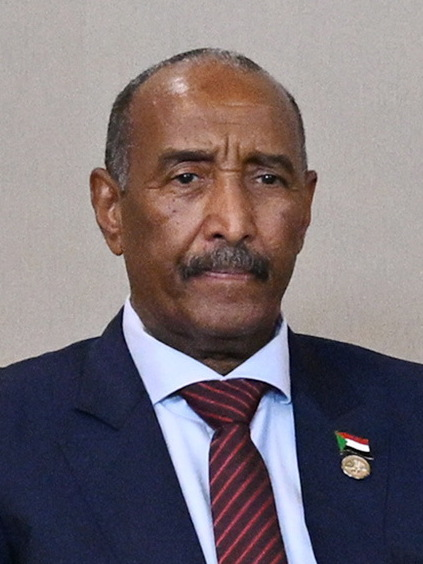
- Al-Burhan in 2025

Leader of Sudan
- De facto
- Assumed office 12 April 2019
- Prime Minister: Abdalla Hamdok; Osman Hussein (acting); Dafallah al-Haj Ali (acting); Kamil Idris
- Preceded by: Ahmed Awad Ibn Auf

President of the Transitional Sovereignty Council
- Incumbent
- Assumed office 11 November 2021
- Deputy: Hemedti (2021–2023); Malik Agar (2023–present)
- Preceded by: Position re-established
- In office 21 August 2019 – 25 October 2021
- Deputy: Hemedti
- Preceded by: Position established; Himself (as Chairman of the TMC)
- Succeeded by: Position abolished

President of the Transitional Military Council
- In office 12 April 2019 – 21 August 2019
- Deputy: Hemedti
- Preceded by: Ahmed Awad Ibn Auf
- Succeeded by: Position abolished; Himself (as Chairman of the TSC)

Commander-in-Chief of the Sudanese Armed Forces
- Incumbent
- Assumed office 12 April 2019
- Leader: Himself; Transitional Sovereignty Council
- Preceded by: Ahmed Awad Ibn Auf

Personal details
- Born: 11 July 1960 (age 66) Gandatu, Northern Directorate, Republic of Sudan (present-day River Nile, Sudan)
- Party: Independent
- Children: Mohammed (deceased)

Military service
- Allegiance: Sudan
- Branch/service: Sudanese Army
- Years of service: 1991–present
- Rank: General
- Battles/wars: Second Sudanese Civil War; War in Darfur; Yemeni civil war (2014–present); Saudi-led intervention in the Yemeni civil war 2019 Sudanese coup d'état 2021 Sudanese coup d'état Sudanese civil war (2023–present): Battle of Khartoum

Abdel Fattah al-Burhan Abdelrahman al-Burhan (Note: Arabic: عَبد الْفَتَّاح الْبُرْهَان عَبد الرَّحْمَن الْبُرْهَان, romanized: ʿAbd al-Fattāḥ al-Burhān ʿAbd al-Raḥmān al-Burhān) (born 11 July 1960) is a Sudanese military officer who has been the leader of Sudan since 2019. Following the Sudanese Revolution in April 2019, he was handed control of the military junta, the Transitional Military Council, a day after it was formed, due to protesters' dissatisfaction with the establishment ties of initial leader Ahmed Awad Ibn Auf. He served as chairman of the TMC until a draft constitutional declaration signed with civilians went into effect on 17 August and a collective head of state Transitional Sovereignty Council was formed on 21 August, also to be initially headed by al-Burhan.

The 2020 Juba Agreement allowed al-Burhan to continue to lead the Sovereignty Council for another 20 months, rather than stepping down as planned in February 2021. Al-Burhan seized power in a coup d'état in October 2021, dissolved the Sovereignty Council, and reconstituted it the following month with new membership, keeping himself as chairman. He was formerly the General Inspector of the Sudanese Armed Forces (SAF).

He is leading the SAF against the Rapid Support Forces (RSF) in the ongoing Sudanese civil war. Al-Burhan survived an assassination attempt in July 2024.

== Early life and education ==
Abdel Fattah al-Burhan was born in 1960 in the village of Gandatu in northern Sudan, to a Ja'ali family. Al-Burhan studied elementary and intermediate level in his village school, and later moved to Shendi to complete his education before joining the Sudanese Military College.

== Military career ==
After graduating from the Military Academy, al-Burhan worked in Khartoum, as part of the Sudanese army, and participated in the fighting fronts in the Darfur war and in the Second Sudanese Civil War in South Sudan and other regions. He was regional commander in Darfur. He later traveled to Egypt and then to Jordan to receive training courses in his military field until in 2018 he was appointed commander of the ground forces of the army.

Al-Burhan held several positions throughout his career as he began as a soldier with the Border Guard Forces and later became commander of this force before becoming Deputy Chief of Staff of the Ground Forces Operations and then Chief of Staff of the Sudanese Army in February 2018 before he served as Inspector General of the Army for a period of time. By 26 February 2019, during the massive protests that swept the country and demanded the fall of Omar al-Bashir's regime, al-Burhan was elevated to the rank of lieutenant general.

== Chairman of the Transitional Military Council (2019) ==
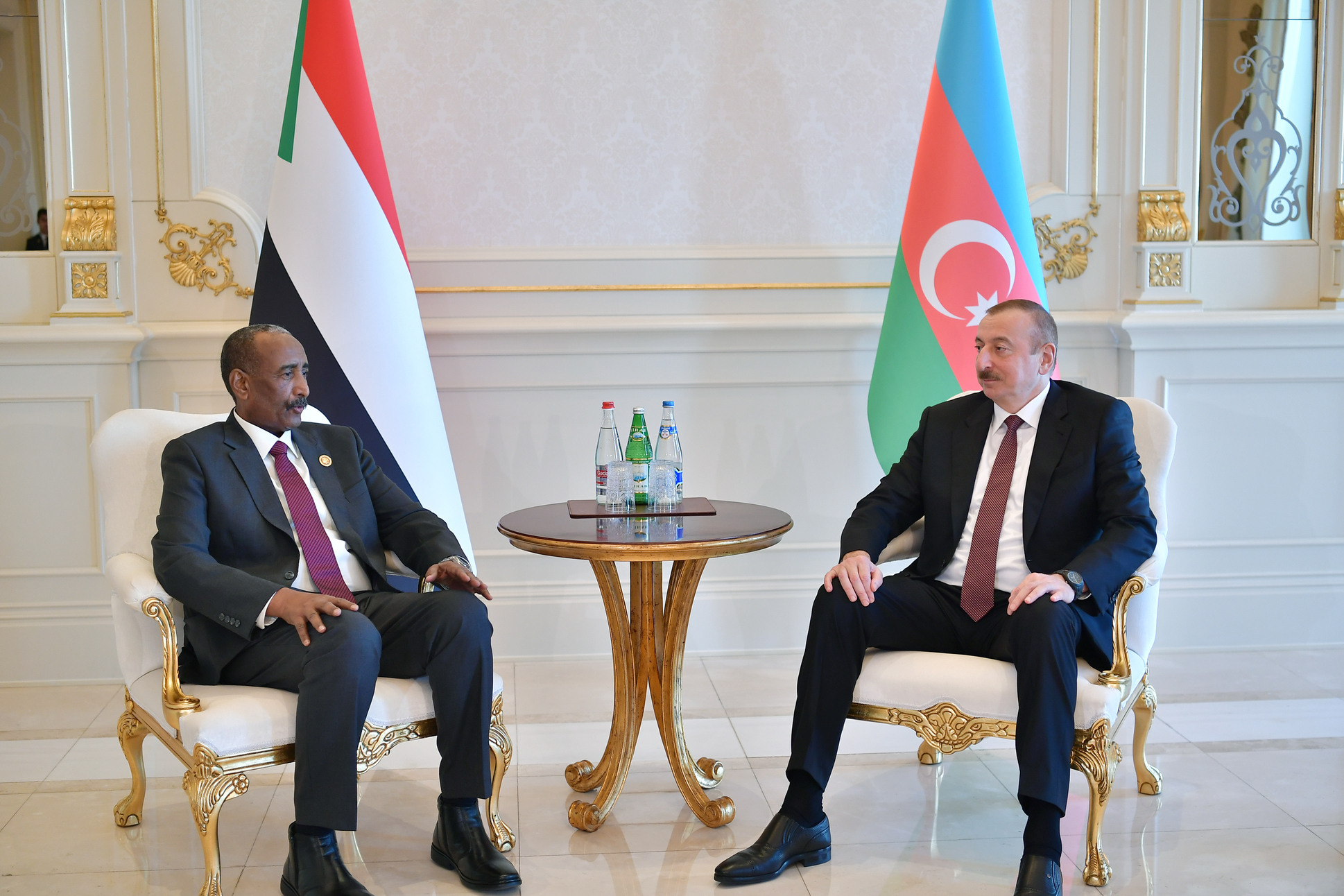
Al-Burhan with Azerbaijani President Ilham Aliyev in October 2019

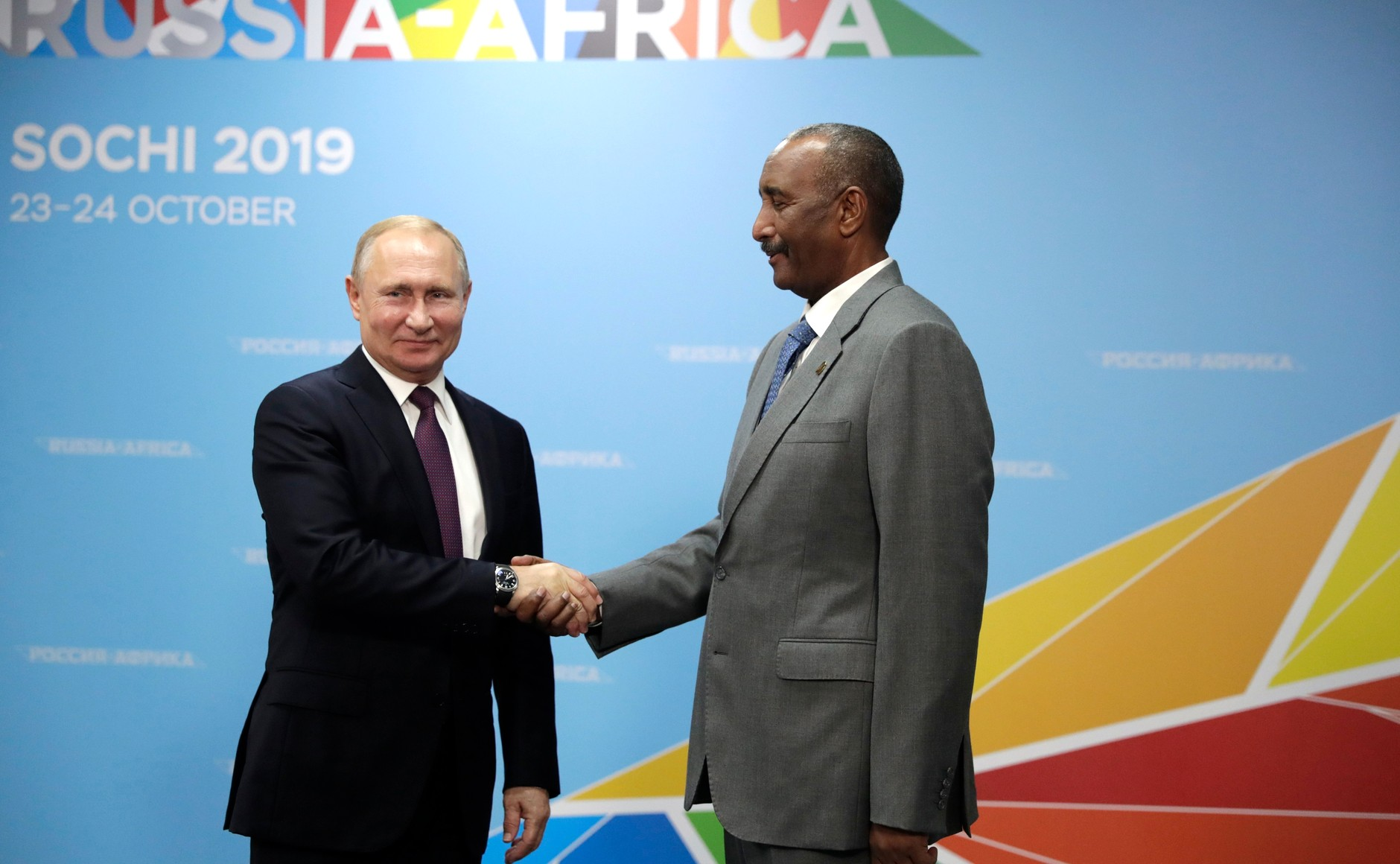
Al-Burhan with Russian President Vladimir Putin at the Russia–Africa Summit in Sochi on 23 October 2019

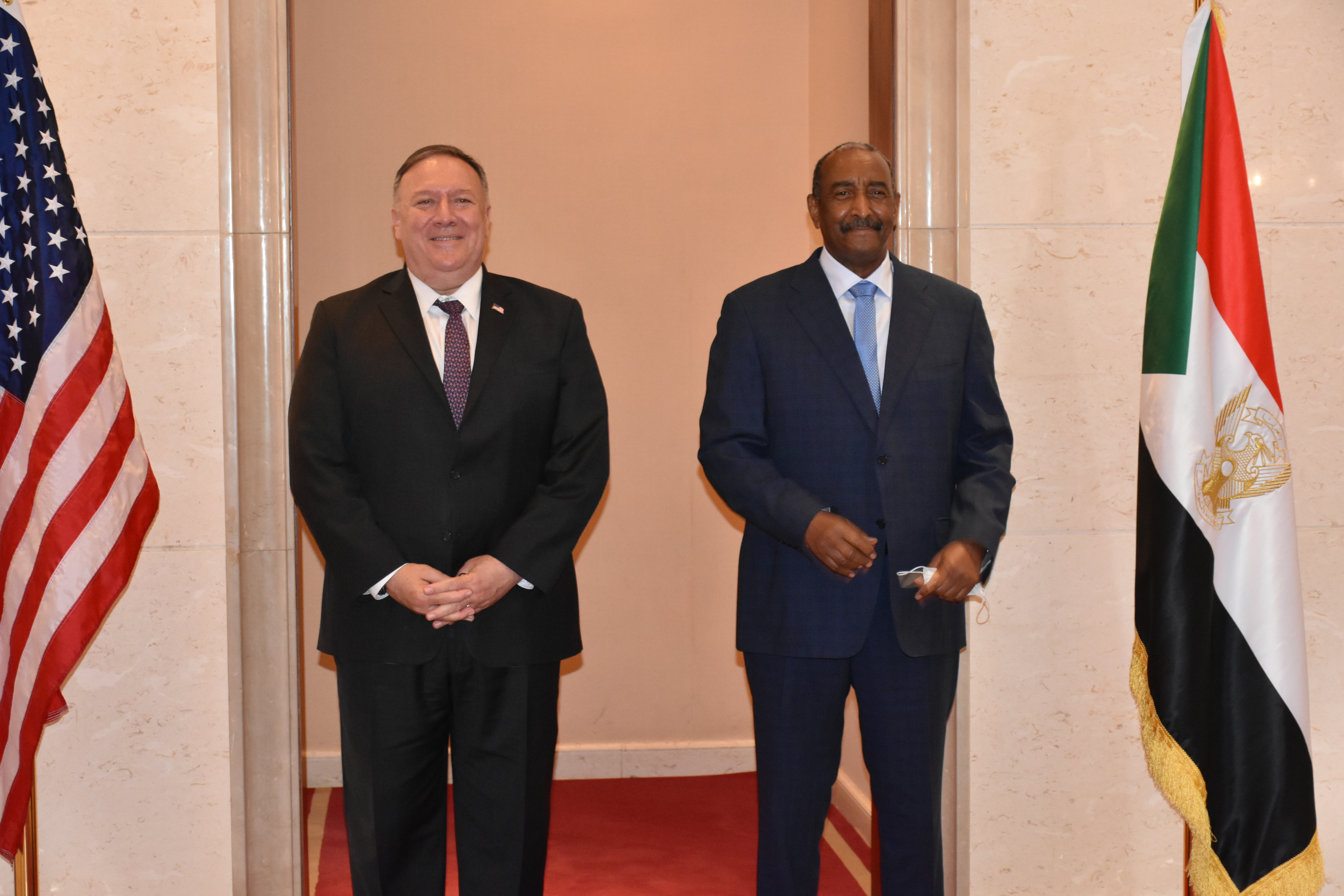
Al-Burhan with US Secretary of State Mike Pompeo in August 2020

Shortly after his appointment, al-Burhan ordered the release of all jailed prisoners who had been arrested by his predecessor, Omar al-Bashir, in a televised address.

=== Khartoum massacre ===
In early June 2019, following al-Burhan's and Hemedti's visits to the Egyptian, UAE and Saudi leaders, the Sudanese Security Forces and Rapid Support Forces, including Janjaweed militias, led by al-Burhan and his deputy cracked down on peaceful protests in Sudan, starting with the 3 June Khartoum massacre. Human rights groups said that peaceful protesters were killed and about forty of the bodies were thrown in the river Nile, hundreds were tortured, violated and raped in the streets of Khartoum.

Al-Burhan's talks with the opposition on forming a combined government were then cancelled. During the days that followed, the TMC arrested several of the opposition leaders.

Iyad el-Baghdadi interpreted the decision-making by the TMC under al-Burhan's leadership as being strongly influenced by the general context of the Saudi, UAE and Egyptian leaders being afraid of democratic movements. Mahmoud Elmutasim, a political activist and doctor who graduated from the University of Khartoum, similarly stated that Saudi Arabia and the UAE are opposed to the existence of democracies in the Middle East, since if "the idea of democracy itself [should] ever take root, or become widespread in the Middle East," then it would constitute a threat to the governmental systems of Saudi Arabia and the UAE.

=== Internet shutdown ===
Several human rights organisations including Human Rights Watch (HRW) condemned the al-Burhan-led TMC for shutting down the internet in June 2019. A spokesperson, Shamseldin Kabbashi, stated that the internet would be shut down for a long time because it represented a threat to national security. The move was described by HRW as a "gross violation of human rights". International media saw this as a sign of dictatorship and condemned the act. Many see it as an attempt to hide what al-Burhan's allied militia, known as the Janjaweed, were doing in Khartoum to delay uploading evidence of the violations that took place on 3 June 2019 and in the days that followed.

=== Civilian government negotiations ===
In May 2019, al-Burhan's first international trip was to Egypt to meet Abdel Fattah el-Sisi. His second visit was to the United Arab Emirates, where he met with the de facto ruler of the United Arab Emirates, Mohamed bin Zayed Al Nahyan. Iyad el-Baghdadi, a human rights activist who became famous during the Arab Spring, later interpreted these visits (together with a visit by TMC deputy leader Hemedti to Mohammed bin Salman in Saudi Arabia) as encouragements for the TMC to cancel negotiations with the opposition. This comment by Iyad el-Baghdadi and recent developments and his ties to the Egyptian brotherhood which he established long ago when he studied in Egypt has led to the popular belief that al-Burhan has no interest to lead Sudan to a democratic and civilian state. Despite his promise to establish a civilian government by February 2021 as demanded by numerous protesters, his group seems to consistently isolate the civilian government led by Hamdok in key government decisions.

Numerous protesters asked for a civilian government. On Saturday 13 April 2019, al-Burhan announced that a civilian government would soon be established. Al-Burhan promised that the transitional period would take a maximum of two years. Negotiations started to take place with the opposition leaders to achieve this.

== Chairman of the Transitional Sovereignty Council (2021–present) ==
On 25 October 2021, al-Burhan led the October 2021 Sudanese coup d'état to overthrow the civilian government of Prime Minister Abdalla Hamdok. On 21 November 2021, all political prisoners were freed and Abdalla Hamdok was reinstated as prime minister as part of an agreement with the civilian political parties. Hamdok was also allowed to return leading the transitional government.

After the coup, Burhan integrated Islamists into sources of power, in particular the SAF. Muslim Brotherhood members who had been active under the Bashir regime became among the principal supporters of al-Burhan and his rule.

On 4 December 2021, al-Burhan told Reuters in an interview that the Sudanese military will "exit politics" following the elections scheduled for July 2023, stating, "When a government is elected, I don't think the army, the armed forces, or any of the security forces will participate in politics. This is what we agreed on and this is the natural situation."

On 9 December 2021, al-Burhan warned of possible measures against foreign diplomatic missions for their alleged incitement against the Sudanese army. He also reiterated his commitment to the political agreement struck with Prime Minister Hamdok in November 2021. On 20 December 2021, al-Burhan voiced his support for Hamdok, adding that recent appointments had been made as the result of coordination between him and the prime minister and in line with the 21 November 2021 political agreement.

On 31 December 2021, in a speech, al-Burhan said he was committed to "building all the institutions of transitional government and holding free, fair, and transparent elections at their scheduled time", in July 2023.

Both al-Burhan and Hemedti had ties to Vladimir Putin's government in Russia. According to Business Insider, "The two generals helped Russian President Vladimir Putin exploit Sudan's gold resources to help buttress Russian finances against Western sanctions and fund his war in Ukraine." On 9 February 2023, al-Burhan met with Russian Foreign Minister Sergey Lavrov.

On 2 January 2022, Abdalla Hamdok resigned from his post of prime minister and Osman Hussein was sworn in as acting prime minister.

On 4 July 2022, it was reported that al-Burhan mentioned the army will withdraw from the ongoing political talks and will allow political and revolutionary groups to form a transitional civilian government. This statement followed recent pro-democracy protests where 117 people were killed.

On 10 November 2023, al-Burhan condemned Israel's actions in the Gaza Strip during the Gaza war, saying that "We declare our full solidarity with the Palestinian people and their right to establish their legitimate state on the 1967 borders."

On 16 January 2025, the U.S. Treasury Department imposed sanctions on al-Burhan. According to sources the reasons were: "targeting of civilians and civilian infrastructure and denial of aid access, as well as refusal to participate in peace talks". In addition, he was accused of "destabilizing Sudan and undermining the goal of a democratic transition" to a civilian-led government. He was also sanctioned by Australia for human rights violations on 5 November 2026.

=== Civil war (2023–present) ===
On 15 April 2023, the country's paramilitary Rapid Support Forces launched attacks against al-Burhan's government, claiming to capture key government sites. Al-Burhan claimed these sites were still under the control of his forces, and that fighting was ongoing. The clashes continued until at least 21 April with occasional ceasefires. Al-Burhan was pinned down at SAF headquarters in Khartoum until August 2023, when a military operation enabled him to evacuate to Port Sudan, where he has been based since then.

The Sudanese military allegedly received support from Ukraine. Ukraine has also allegedly sent troops to fight in Omdurman. Their rival, the Rapid Support Forces, had reportedly received support from Libya and the United Arab Emirates as well as Russia's Wagner Group. The foreign involvement in the regional war could have a devastating effect on Sudan.

Al-Burhan survived an assassination attempt while attending a military graduation ceremony in Gebeit, in July 2024. Five people were killed in the drone attack.

In August 2025, a military official in Sudan confirmed that al-Burhan's envoy, Al-Sadiq Ismail, visited Israel in a push to speed the process of formal normalization between both countries through the Abraham Accords, which has been delayed due to the war. It was reported that Sudan wanted Israeli support following the capture of Khartoum by the SAF in exchange for Sudan's recognition.

== Personal life ==
On 6 March 2024, al-Burhan's son, Mohammed Fattah Burhan Rahman, was severely injured after his motorcycle collided with another vehicle in Ankara, Turkey. He died of his injuries on 3 May after spending nearly two months in intensive care.

== See also ==
- List of current heads of state and government
- List of heads of the executive by approval rating

== Notes ==
Military offices
| Preceded by Ahmed Awad Ibn Auf | Commander-in-Chief of the Sudanese Armed Forces; 2019–present | Incumbent |
Political offices
| Preceded by Ahmed Awad Ibn Auf | Chairman of the Transitional Military Council; 2019 | Succeeded by Transitional Sovereignty Council |
| New office | Chairman of the Transitional Sovereignty Council; 2019–present With an interruption from October–November 2021 | Incumbent |
