= Abdalla Hamdok government =

Government in Sudan (2019–2022)

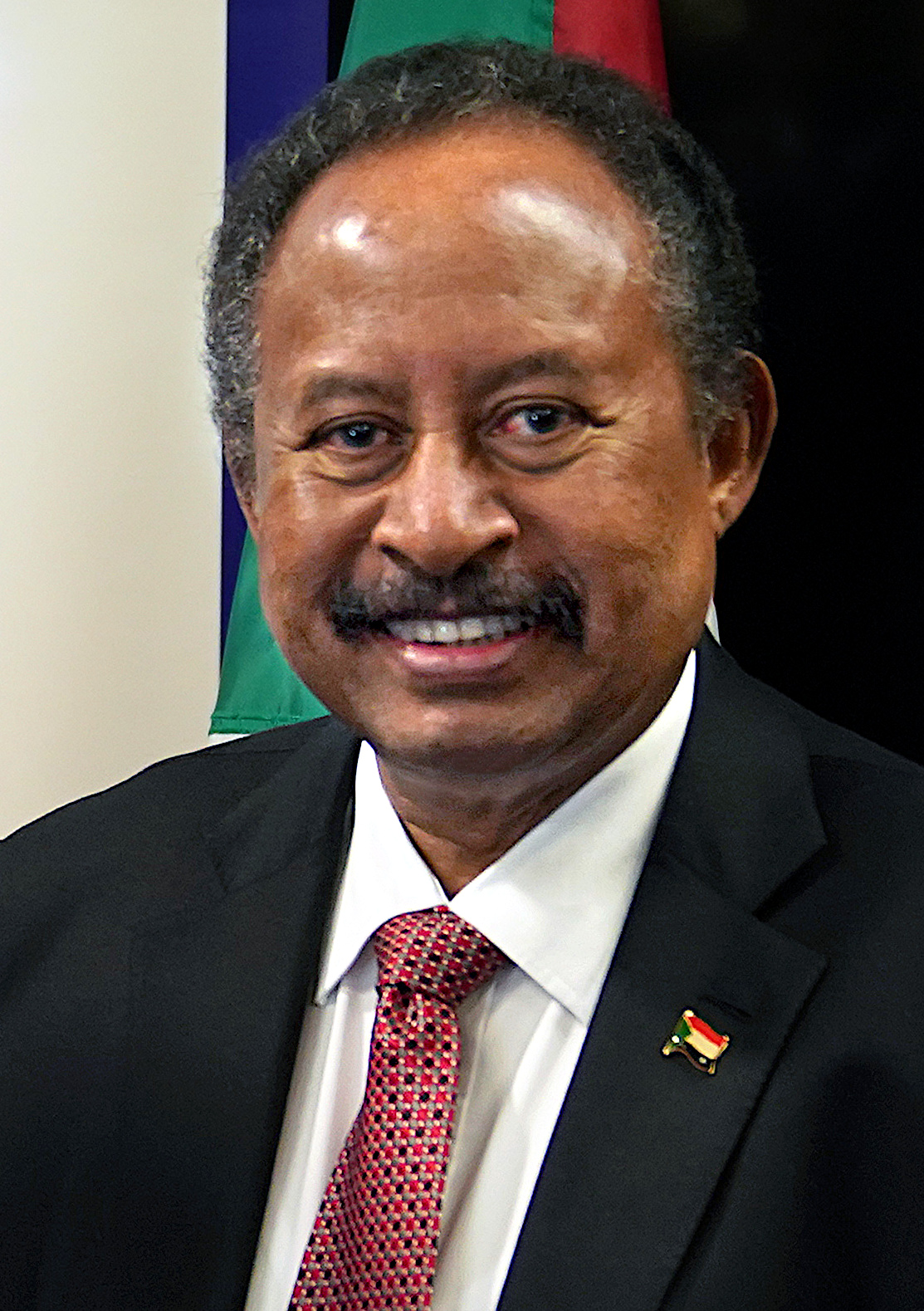
- Abdalla Hamdok
- Date formed: 21 November 2019
- Date dissolved: 2 January 2022

People and organisations
- Head of state: Transitional Sovereignty Council
- Prime Minister: Abdalla Hamdok
- Status in legislature: Transitional

History
- Predecessor: Transitional Military Council
- Successor: Osman Hussein government

The Abdalla Hamdok government was the cabinet of the Republic of the Sudan formed in the aftermath of the 11 April 2019 Sudanese coup d'état.

Chapter 5 of the August 2019 Draft Constitutional Declaration defined the procedures which led to the nomination of Abdalla Hamdok as prime minister, and up to 20 ministers in the transitional government, during the 39-month democratic transition. The Sudanese Women's Union protested against this. Under Article 19 of the Draft Constitutional Declaration, the ministers of the Transitional Cabinet are ineligible to run in the election scheduled to follow the transition period.

In October 2021, the Hamdok government was overthrown in the 2021 Sudanese coup d'état. The Hamdok government was reinstated on 21 November 2021 and dissolved on 2 January 2022 when Abdalla Hamdok resigned as prime minister of Sudan. A civil war broke out in Sudan in April 2023.

== Formation ==
The 2018–19 Sudanese protests led to the 11 April 2019 Sudanese coup d'état which overthrew President Omar al-Bashir and dissolved his Cabinet. The defense minister who led the coup was removed on 14 April 2019.

=== Draft Constitutional Declaration ===
The sustained civil disobedience by Sudanese citizens that preceded the April coup d'état continued, in opposition to the Transitional Military Council (TMC). Negotiations between the TMC and the Forces of Freedom and Change alliance (FFC) led to the July Political Agreement and the August Draft Constitutional Declaration, which gave the FFC the choice of the ministers of the transitional government, with the sovereignty council holding the right to veto nominations, apart from the defence and interior ministers, who are to be selected by military members of the Sovereignty Council and appointed by the prime minister. Chapter 5 (Article 14) of the Draft Constitutional Declaration defines the Transitional Cabinet in similar terms, but gives the Prime Minister the right to choose the other members of the cabinet from a list provided to him or her by the FFC. The cabinet members are "confirmed by the Sovereignty Council".

Article 16.(a) of the Draft Constitutional Declaration requires the prime minister and members of Cabinet to be "Sudanese by birth", at least 25 years old, a clean police record for "crimes of honour".

Article 16.(b) excludes dual nationals from being a minister of defence, interior, foreign affairs or justice unless an exemption is agreed by the Sovereignty Council and the FFC for the position of prime minister, or by the Sovereignty Council and the prime minister for ministerial positions.

The transitional period ministers are forbidden under Article 19 of the Draft Constitutional Declaration from running in the planned 2022 Sudanese general election.

=== Prime minister ===
Abdalla Hamdok, a Sudanese public administrator who served in numerous international administrative positions during the late twentieth and early twenty-first centuries, was nominated by the FFC as prime minister and formally sworn in on 21 August 2019.

=== Women's participation ===
On 18 August 2019, the Sudanese Women's Union stated that women had not been consulted in the preparation of a list of candidates for ministerial posts for the 2019–2022 Transitional Cabinet, and that few women were among the candidates. Women in senior positions in the transitional period institutions include Aisha Musa el-Said and Raja Nicola in the Sovereignty Council of Sudan.

The Sudanese Women's Union argued that women had played as significant a role as men in the political changes of 2019 and that Sudanese women "claim an equal share of 50-50 with men at all levels, measured by qualifications and capabilities".

Women ministers in the Hamdok Cabinet include Asma Mohamed Abdalla as foreign minister, Lena el-Sheikh Mahjoub as minister of social development and labour, Wala'a Essam al-Boushi as minister for youth and sports, Intisar el-Zein Soughayroun as minister of higher education.

=== Budget ===
The al-Bashir annual national budgets mostly funded Sudanese security and other armed forces (70 percent in 2016), with the 2018 budget allocating 3 percent to education. In November 2019, a plan to raise the fraction of the budget allocated to education to 20 percent was announced.

== Ministers ==
In September 2019, 20 ministries were planned.

Office	Incumbent (with alternative transliterations)	Website	Since	Left office
Prime Minister	Abdalla Hamdok		21 August 2019	02 January 2022
Minister of Foreign Affairs	Asma Mohamed Abdalla		8 September 2019	9 July 2020
Minister of Foreign Affairs	Omer Ismail		9 July 2020	9 February 2021
Minister of Foreign Affairs	Mariam al-Mahdi		9 February 2021	
Minister of Finance and Economy	Ibrahim Elbadawi (also: Ibrahim Ahmed El Badawi)		8 September 2019	9 July 2020
Minister of Finance and Economy	Hiba Mohammed Ali		9 July 2020	9 February 2021
Minister of Finance and Economy	Gibril Ibrahim		9 February 2021	
Minister of Health	Akram Ali Altom (also: el-Toam, Eltom)		8 September 2019	9 July 2020
Minister of Health	Sara Abdelazeem		9 July 2020	9 February 2021
Minister of Health	Omar El Najeeb		9 February 2021	
Minister of Education	Mohammed el-Amin el-Tom (also: el-Toam, Altom))		8 September 2019	
Minister of Industry and Trade	Madani Abbas Madani		8 September 2019	9 February 2021
Minister of Industry and Trade	Ibrahim El Sheikh		9 February 2021	
Minister of Energy and Oil	Adel Ibrahim (also: Adil)		8 September 2019	9 July 2020
Minister of Energy and Oil	Khairy Abdel Rahman		9 July 2020	9 February 2021
Minister of Energy and Oil	Jaden Ali		9 February 2021	
Minister of Irrigation and Water Resources	Yasser Abbas Mohamed Ali		8 September 2019	
Minister of Agriculture and Natural Resources	Issa Osman Sharif (also: Eissa)		8 September 2019	9 July 2020
Minister of Agriculture and Natural Resources	Abdelgadir Turkawi		9 July 2020	9 February 2021
Minister of Agriculture and Natural Resources	Taher Harbi		9 February 2021	
Minister of Livestock and Fisheries	Alam al-Din Abdallah Abashar (also: Alam-Aldin, Abasher)		15 October 2019	9 July 2020
Minister of Livestock and Fisheries	Adil Idris		9 July 2020	9 February 2021
Minister of Livestock and Fisheries	Hafez Nabi		9 February 2021	
Minister of Infrastructure and Transport	Hashim Tahir Sheikh Taha (also: Hashem)		15 October 2019	9 July 2020
Minister of Infrastructure and Transport	Hashim Ibn Auf		9 July 2020	9 February 2021
Minister of Infrastructure and Transport	Mirghani Mousa		9 February 2021	
Minister of Labour and Administrative Reform	Lena el-Sheikh Mahjoub		8 September 2019	9 February 2021
Minister of Labour and Administrative Reform	Taysir El Nourani		9 February 2021	
Minister of Justice	Nasreldin Abdelbari (also: Nasr-Eddin Abdul-Bari, Nasr al-Din Abdel Bari)		9 September 2019	
Minister of Youth and Sports	Wala'a Essam al-Boushi		8 September 2019	9 February 2021
Minister of Youth and Sports	Yousef El Dai		9 February 2021	
Minister of Cabinet Affairs	Omar Munis (also: Omer Manies)		8 September 2019	9 February 2021
Minister of Cabinet Affairs	Khaled Omar		9 February 2021	
Minister of Federal Government	Youssef Adam Aldai (or Yousef, el-Dhai)		8 September 2019	9 February 2021
Minister of Federal Government	Butheina Dinar		9 February 2021	
Minister of Culture and Information	Faisal Mohamed Saleh		8 September 2019	9 February 2021
Minister of Culture and Information	Hamza Baloul		9 February 2021	
Minister of Higher Education	Intisar el-Zein Soughayroun		8 September 2019	
Minister of Religious Affairs	Nasr al-Din Mufreh (also: Nasr-Eddin Mofarah)		8 September 2019	
Minister of Defence	Jamal Aldin Omar (also: Omer)		8 September 2019	25 March 2020
Minister of Defence	Yassin Ibrahim Yassin		2 June 2020	
Minister of Interior	Idriss al-Traifi (also: el-Teraifi Idris)		8 September 2019	9 February 2021
Minister of Interior	Ezzeldin El Sheikh		9 February 2021	
General Intelligence Service	Jamal Abdelmajeed	https://twitter.com/GisGovSd	16 January 2020	
Minister of Communications and Digital Transformation	Hashem Hasabelrasoul		9 February 2021	
Minister of Investment and International Cooperation	Mohamed Ibrahim		9 February 2021	
Minister of Mining	Mohamed Abunumou		9 February 2021	
Minister of Social Development	Mutasim Ahmed Saleh		9 February 2021	
Minister of Trade	Ali Jido		9 February 2021	

== See also ==
- Transitional Sovereignty Council
- Cabinet of Sudan
- Government of Sudan
- Politics of Sudan
