= Taj al-Sir Ahmed Suleiman =

Sudanese journalist

- Disappeared: October 26, 2025; Al-Daraga neighborhood
- Died: October 26, 2025; Al-Daraga neighborhood
- Citizenship: Sudan
- Occupation: Journalist
- Employer: Sudan News Agency (SUNA)

Taj al-Sir Ahmed Suleiman was the director of the Sudan News Agency (SUNA) in North Darfur state, who was reportedly killed by Rapid Support Forces (RSF) in his house in 2025.

== Career ==
Suleiman worked for SUNA as an editor. Before his death, he was the bureau chief of SUNA in North Darfur State. He covered local news on politics, human rights, and war.

== His death ==
Suleiman was reported missing when the RSF took over the city of El Fasher in late October. Later, the news broke out that he had been executed on along side his brother. SUNA gave an official announcement that he was killed in his house in theAl-Daraga neighborhood. His death was confirmed by the Sudanese Information Minister, Khalid Al-Ayesir adding that other journalists are still in detention since the take over of the city.

== Aftermath and reactions ==
The Sudanese Information Minister said that Suleiman was killed by the RSF. He urged international organizations with a mandate to protect journalists to follow up on the case and also help protect journalists who are still in captivity. The Committee to Protect Journalists (CPJ) also called for an investigation into the killing of Suleiman. The Chief Program Officer of the CPJ also urged all parties involved in the conflict to stop targeting journalists to ensure safety of the members of the press. The Sudanese Journalists Syndicate in its report stated that 67 violations were carried out against Sudanese media in 2025, and named El Fasher, the capital of North Darfur as the most dangerous place for journalists in 2025.

== See also ==
- Siege of El Fasher
- El Fasher massacre
