= Yasser al-Atta =

Sudanese army officer (born 1962)

Lieutenant General Yasser al-Atta
- ياسر العطا
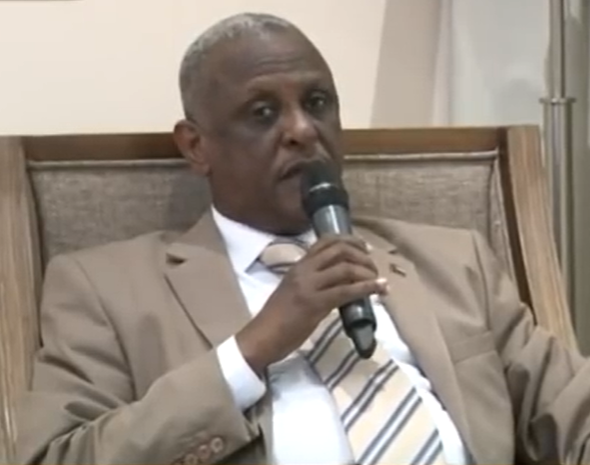
- Yasser al-Atta in an interview by Ashorooq Tv in December 2019

Member of the Transitional Sovereignty Council
- Incumbent
- Assumed office 20 August 2019
- Prime Minister: Abdalla Hamdok; Osman Hussein (acting); Dafallah al-Haj Ali (acting); Kamil Idris
- Chairman: Abdel Fattah al-Burhan

Chief of Staff of the Sudanese Armed Forces
- Incumbent
- Assumed office 2 April 2026
- Preceded by: Othman al-Hussein

Member of the Transitional Military Council
- In office 11 April 2019 – 20 August 2019
- Prime Minister: Abdalla Hamdok
- Chairman: Abdel Fattah al-Burhan

Personal details
- Born: c. 1962 (age 63–64) Bait al-Mal, Omdurman, Republic of Sudan
- Relations: Hashem al-Atta (uncle)

Military service
- Allegiance: Sudanese Armed Forces
- Rank: Lieutenant General
- Battles/wars: Second Sudanese Civil War; War in Darfur; Sudanese civil war (2023–present); Battle of Khartoum (2023–2025)

General Yasser Abdelrahman Hassan Al-Atta (Arabic: ياسر عبد الرحمن حسن العطا, romanized: Yāsir al-ʻAṭā, c. 1962) is a Sudanese military officer who serves as the Chief of Staff of the Sudanese Armed Forces (SAF).

Atta has been a member of the Sudanese Sovereignty Council since 21 August 2019, and previously served as Vice Chairman of the Transitional Military Council in 2019. He was also the former commander of the Sudanese Border Guard Forces, and was once a military attaché in Djibouti. His uncle was Major Hashim al-Atta, who led and was executed for the 1971 coup d'état.

== Military career ==
=== 2023 Sudanese civil war ===
In May, al-Atta stated that the army controlled most of the country, except for a few small areas, while accusing media linked to the Rapid Support Forces (RSF) of spreading misinformation. He thanked Saudi Arabia and the United States for their mediation efforts but emphasized the army's goal of expelling the RSF from Khartoum. Al-Atta dismissed the possibility of the conflict escalating into a civil war, asserting that the army represented all of Sudan. Additionally, he raised concerns about the presence of the Wagner Group in the conflict and highlighted issues related to gold extraction in Sudan.

In July, al-Atta accused Kenyan President William Ruto of supporting the RSF, undermining his role in the East African peacekeeping mission. Sudan refuses to cooperate with the Intergovernmental Authority on Development's Quartet Group, led by Ruto, until he is replaced. Al-Atta challenged Ruto to face the Sudanese army. Kenyan officials condemn these remarks. In August, al-Atta stated that around 80% of the RSF have been incapacitated, continuing that the RSF continues to recruit inexperienced mercenaries, but the army repelled 6,000 new RSF fighters recently.

In November 2023, al-Atta stated that the UАЕ had provided unidentified supplies to the RSF through Uganda, the Central African Republic (CAR), and Chad. Moreover, In January 2024, during a tour in Omdurman, he announced his intention to file a complaint with regional institutions and escalate it to the UN Security Council against the UАЕ’s involvement in the Sudanese conflict.

In October 2026, he was sentenced to life in prison alongside seven other Sudanese officials by a federal court in Abu Dhabi over illegal arms trafficking that saw the delivery of ammunition from the UAE to Port Sudan, and money laundering to the Sudanese Armed Forces.
