= Wala'a Essam al-Boushi =

Sudanese activist (born 1986)

Walaa Isam Elboushi
- ولاء عصام البوشي
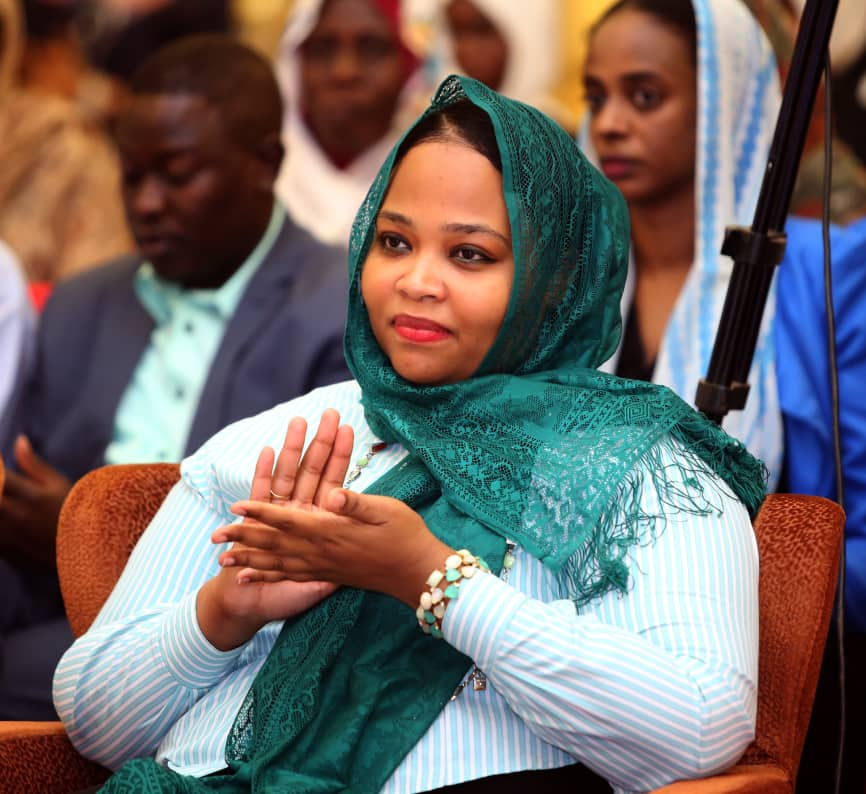

Minister of Youth and Sports
- Incumbent
- Assumed office September 2019
- Prime Minister: Abdalla Hamdok

Personal details
- Born: 1986 (age 39–40) Wad Madani, Sudan

Walaa Issam ElBoushi (also: Wala'a, Walla, Isam, Essam, al-Bushi, al-Boushi, el-Boushi; Arabic: ولاء عصام البوشي) is a Sudanese activist who became the Sudanese Minister of Youth and Sport in early September 2019 in the Transitional Cabinet of Prime Minister Abdalla Hamdok, during the 2019 Sudanese transition to democracy.

== Early life and education ==
Al-Boushi was born in 1986 in Wad Madani. She has a Master's degree in Advanced Engineering Mechanics from the Imperial College London.

== Political activism ==
Al-Boushi was involved in anti-government activism in Sudan during the presidency of Omar al-Bashir, who was overthrown in the April 2019 Sudanese coup d'état.

== Minister of Youth and Sport ==
In early September 2019, al-Boushi became the Sudanese Minister of Youth and Sport in the Transitional Cabinet of Prime Minister Abdalla Hamdok, during the 2019 Sudanese transition to democracy. Other women leaders of Sudan during the transitional period include Chief Justice Nemat Abdullah Khair, and Sovereignty Council members Aisha Musa el-Said and Raja Nicola. Al-Boushi described her nomination as being to the "Ministry of the Revolution". She expressed her enthusiasm for the position, stating,

The era of darkness is over, and we are entering a new era achieved by the efforts of youth and sacrifices, and will continue and will be led by young people, through this ministry to make the next history, to be the first democratic government elected after the transition period, majority of young people.

— Wala'a Essam al-Boushi, as quoted by Khartoum Star

=== Women's football ===
On 30 September 2019, a 21-team women's football league was launched under al-Boushi's ministership, with both al-Boushi and Aisha Musa present at the match between the Eltahadi and Eldifaa teams, refereed by female umpires.

An Islamist preacher and supporter of former president Omar al-Bashir, Abdal Hai Youssef, accused al-Boushi of blasphemy and apostasy for having re-introduced women's football to Sudan. Under Article 126.2 of the 1991 version of the Sudanese Penal Code, apostasy is punishable by the death sentence if the accused does not repent. Al-Boushi lodged an official complaint against Youssef. Information Minister Faisal Saleh stated that Youssef's comments constituted an attack against women's rights and said that the Sudanese cabinet requested the Ministry of Justice to take "the necessary legal measures" against Youssef.
