= Intisar el-Zein Soughayroun =

Professor of archeology (born 1957 or 1958)

- انتصار الزين صغيرون

Minister of Higher Education
- In office September 2019 – 19 January 2022
- Prime Minister: Abdalla Hamdok
- Succeeded by: Mohamed Hassan Dahab Ahmed (acting)

Personal details
- Born: 1957 or 1958 (age 68–69)
- Occupation: archeologist

Intisar el-Zein Soughayroun (also: Intsar, al-Zein, el-Zein, Sghairyoun, Segayron; Arabic: انتصار الزين صغيرون) is a professor of archeology at the University of Khartoum. In early September 2019 Soughayroun became the Sudanese Minister for Higher Education in the Transitional Cabinet of Prime Minister Abdalla Hamdok, during the 2019 Sudanese transition to democracy.

== Archaeological research ==
Soughayroun is a professor of archaeology at the University of Khartoum. She is involved in ongoing scientific collaboration with the University of Bergen in Norway. Her research interests include the archaeology of Islam in Sudan. She has worked on the site of Qasr Wad nimieri, which is 470 km north of Khartoum. She studied for her MA and her PhD at the American University in Cairo, with a doctoral dissertation examining Islamic domed tombs in Sudan; she graduated from her PhD in 1986.

Soughayroun was co-director of the Meroe Archival Project, which was a collaboration between the University of Reading and the University of Khartoum.

=== Publications include ===
- Islamic Archaeology in the Sudan
- 'Ottoman Archaeology of the Middle Nile Valley in the Sudan', in The Frontiers of the Ottoman World

== 2018–2019 Sudanese protests ==
Soughayroun participated in the 2018–2019 Sudanese protests. One of her nephews was killed in the 3 June 2019 Khartoum massacre. In early July 2019, she expressed scepticism regarding negotiations with the Transitional Military Council, based on past experience, and supported continued civil disobedience. She felt that the TMC was weakening in power.

== Minister of Higher Education ==
In early September 2019, Soughayroun was appointed as the Minister of Higher Education of Sudan (or head of the Higher Education and Scientific Research Council) in the Transitional Cabinet of Prime Minister Abdalla Hamdok, during the 2019 Sudanese transition to democracy. Other women leaders of Sudan during the transitional period include Chief Justice Nemat Abdullah Khair, and Sovereignty Council members Aisha Musa el-Said and Raja Nicola.
