= Ahmed Awad Ibn Auf =

Sudanese politician (born 1956)

General Ahmed Awad Ibn Auf
- أحمد عوض بن عوف

Chairman of the Transitional Military Council
- In office 11 April 2019 – 12 April 2019
- Deputy: Kamal Abdel-Marouf al-Mahi
- Preceded by: Omar al-Bashir (as President of Sudan)
- Succeeded by: Abdel Fattah al-Burhan

First Vice President of Sudan
- In office 23 February 2019 – 11 April 2019
- President: Omar al-Bashir
- Preceded by: Bakri Hassan Saleh

Minister of Defence of Sudan
- In office 23 August 2015 – 14 April 2019
- President: Omar al-Bashir; Himself
- Preceded by: Mustafa Osman Obeid
- Succeeded by: Jamal Aldin Omar

Personal details
- Born: 1956 (age 69–70) Qerri, Sudan
- Party: National Congress Party (Until 11 April 2019)

Military service
- Allegiance: Sudan
- Branch/service: Sudanese Army
- Rank: General
- Battles/wars: War in Darfur; 2019 Sudanese coup d'état

Ahmed Awad Ibn Auf (born c. 1956; Arabic: أحمد عوض بن عوف) is a Sudanese military officer and politician who served as the head of state for one day from 11 April 2019 to 12 April 2019 after taking part in the 2019 Sudanese coup d'état. Auf previously served as the minister of defense in Sudan from 23 August 2015 to 14 April 2019, and the First Vice President of Sudan from February to April 2019.

== Military and governmental career ==
Auf previously served as Head of Military Intelligence, and also Chairman of the Joint Chiefs of Staff before he was relieved in June 2010 as part of a major military shakeup. Following his military service, he served as the Sudanese ambassador to Saudi Arabia and Oman.

Auf was on a May 2007 list of individuals sanctioned by the United States due to his alleged role as a liaison between the Sudanese government and the Janjaweed in the Darfur War and his close relations to Iran. There are credible allegations that Auf coordinated Janjaweed operations leading to bombing attacks by Antonov aircraft on civilians, villages attacked, forced displacement, and mass rape (Tawila, North Darfur). However, Auf is not among those who have been indicted by the International Criminal Court for crimes committed in Darfur.

On 23 August 2015, he was appointed as Defense Minister of Sudan by President Omar al-Bashir.

=== Vice president ===
Auf was appointed first vice president in February 2019, replacing Bakri Hassan Saleh following President Bashir's dismissal of his cabinet in the wake of mass protests.

=== Coup ===
On 11 April 2019, he announced on Sudanese national television that the government had been dissolved and the constitution suspended. He said the military would be in charge, with a 10pm curfew and a two-year transition period. He declared closure of Sudan's airspace for 24 hours, closure of border crossings, and a three-month state of emergency. The National Assembly was dissolved, with Auf adding that Sudan was preparing for "free and fair" elections. He resigned the next day due to continued protests which stemmed from the fact that many people considered him a leading figure from the previous government, this was further aggravated by his decision not to extradite al-Bashir to the International Criminal Court. As his final act, Auf made Lt. Gen. Abdel Fattah al-Burhan, who served as general inspector of the armed forces, his successor.

Political offices
Preceded by Omar al-Bashir as President of Sudan	Chairman of the Transitional Military Council; 2019	Succeeded by Abdel Fattah al-Burhan
Preceded by Bakri Hassan Saleh	First Vice President of Sudan; 2019	Succeeded by —
Preceded by Mustafa Osman Obeid	Minister of Defence of Sudan; 2015–2019	Succeeded by Jamal Aldin Omar
