= Montaser Abdullah =

Sudanese lawyer

- منتصر عبد الله
- Citizenship: Sudan
- Occupations: Human rights activist Lawyer
- Organization: Tagadum
- Criminal charges: Espionage; Undermining constitutional order War against the state
- Criminal status: Acquitted

Montaser Abdullah Suleiman Khairallah (Arabic: منتصر عبد الله سليمان خير الله) is a Sudanese human rights activist and lawyer, known for providing legal assistance to victims of gender-based violence. After representing the Sudanese Coordination of Civil Democratic Forces, he was arbitrarily detained by Sudanese authorities and faced the death penalty before being acquitted of all charges in 2025.

== Activism ==
Abdullah became known for providing legal assistance and support to survivors of gender-based violence. He went on to join the legal team of Tagadum, a pro-civilian coalition involved in peace negotiations to try to bring about the end of the Sudanese civil war which included the former President of Sudan, Abdalla Hamdok. Abdullah represented Tagadum in human rights cases as well as politically sensitive trials, and also provided legal representation to the Sudanese Congress Party. He led Tagadum's legal team following accusations made against the organisation by the National Committee for Investigating Crimes and Violation of National laws and International Humanitarian Law, including of undermining constitutional order, waging war against the state, crimes against humanity and war crimes.

== Arrest, imprisonment and trial ==
Likely due to his work with Tagadum, Abdullah was placed under surveillance by Sudanese authorities by at least late March 2024.

On 7 September 2024, Abdullah was abducted from his offices by the Sudanese Armed Forces; no arrest warrant was issued. His whereabouts remained unknown until 3 October, when he was presented at the Criminal Court of Red Sea State in Port Sudan, where he was charged with espionage, undermining constitutional order and waging war against the state under the Sudanese Criminal Act, the Anti-Terrorism Law and the Cybercrimes Act.

During his detention at Port Sudan Central Prison, Abdullah was reportedly forced to waive his legal immuninity, granted through his occupation as a practicing trial lawyer. He was also reportedly pressured to confess, though refused. During his imprisonment, worries were raised about his treatment, including him being held in a small cell without access to basic facilities; being subjected to regular beatings; being forced to remain unclothed; and being denied access to healthcare.

Abdullah's trial started on 21 April 2025. He faced a minimum sentence of 20 years imprisonment and a maximum sentence of the death penalty. Abdullah denied the charges against him. He continued to be held in pre-trial detention during the proceedings.

On 20 October 2024, Abdullah was acquitted of all major charges; he was sentenced to one year and four months in prison for cybercrime offences, effective from the date of his arrest, and was released later that day after paying a fine of one million SDG.

== Response ==
Front Line Defenders called on Sudanese authorities to immediately release Abdullah and terminate all the criminal cases opened against him and to guarantee his safe treatment in detention and the respect the rights of all human rights activists in Sudan.

Nine legal organisations, including Lawyers for Lawyers and the International Bar Association, issued a joint statement expressing their "deep concerns" about Abdullah's "arbitrary arrest and detention" which they stated was due to his work as a lawyer.

In May 2025, the United Nations special rapporteur on human rights defenders wrote to the government of Sudan about Abdullah's treatment and potential death sentence; it had previously expressed concern about his arbitrary arrest and detention.

The Sudanese Human Rights Monitor called on Sudanese authorities to "immediately and unconditionally" release Abdullah.

The National Umma Party condemned the trial against Abdullah which they stated was due to his job defending "human values, freedoms and human rights". The Beja Congress also condemned his ongoing detention and called for his immediate release.
