= Copts in Sudan =

Overview of Coptic people in Sudan

Total population
- 400,000–500,000 (2008)

Regions with significant populations
- Dongola, Khartoum, Wad Madani, El Obeid, Port Sudan, Atbara and Omdurman

Languages
- Sudanese Arabic, English; Liturgical: Coptic

Religion
- Coptic Orthodoxy

Related ethnic groups
- Copts

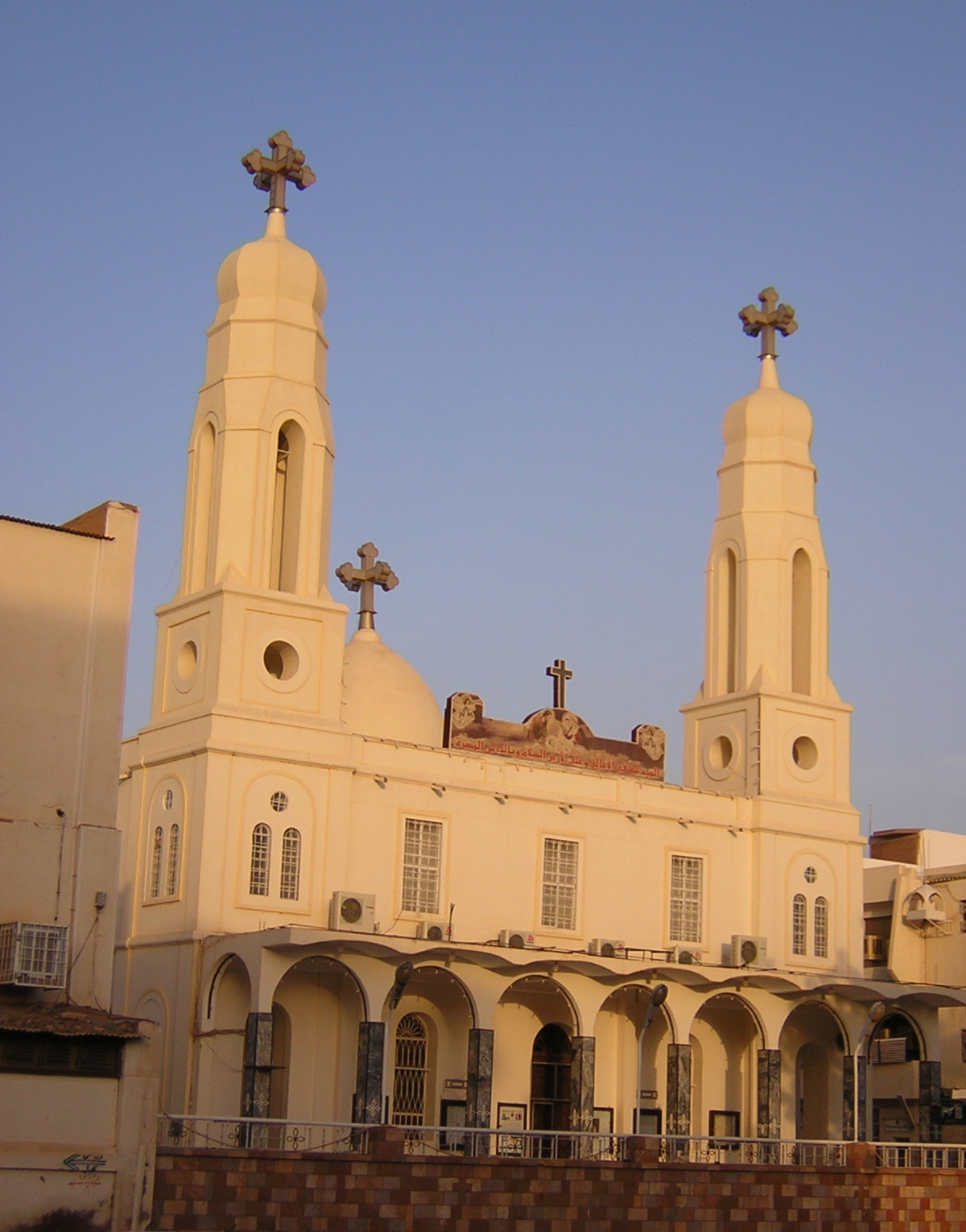
Holy Mary Coptic Orthodox Cathedral, Khartoum, Sudan.

Sudan has a native Coptic minority, although many Copts in Sudan are descended from more recent Coptic immigrants from Egypt. Copts in Sudan live mostly in northern cities, including Al Obeid, Atbara, Dongola, Khartoum, Omdurman, Port Sudan, and Wad Medani. They number between 400,000-500,000, or slightly over 1% of the Sudanese population. Due to their advanced education, their role in the life of the country has been more significant than their numbers suggest.

Modern immigration of Copts to Sudan peaked in the early 19th century, and they generally received a tolerant welcome there. However, this was interrupted by a decade of persecution under Mahdist rule at the end of the 19th century. As a result of this persecution, many were forced to relinquish their faith, adopt Islam, and intermarry with the native Sudanese population. The Anglo-Egyptian invasion in 1898 allowed Copts greater religious and economic freedom, and they extended their original roles as artisans and merchants into trading, banking, engineering, medicine, and the civil service. Proficiency in business and administration made them a privileged minority.

Today, the Coptic Church in Sudan is officially registered with the government, and is exempt from property tax. In 2005, the Sudanese government of National Unity (GNU) named a Coptic Orthodox priest to a government position. After the Sudanese Revolution of 2019, a Coptic Orthodox priest led the inauguration of the new prime minister of Sudan, Abdalla Hamdok. A Coptic Christian woman, Raja Nicola, was also appointed to serve in Sudan's new Transitional Council.

== Persecutions ==
Copts have occasionally faced forced conversion to Islam, resulting in their emigration and decrease in number.

The return of militant Islam in the mid-1960s and subsequent demands by radicals for an Islamic constitution prompted Copts to join in public opposition to religious rule.

Gaafar Nimeiry's introduction of Islamic Sharia law in 1983 began a new phase of oppressive treatment of Copts, among other non-Muslims. After the overthrow of Nimeiry, Coptic leaders supported a secular candidate in the 1986 elections. However, when the National Islamic Front overthrew the elected government of Sadiq al-Mahdi with the help of the military, discrimination against Copts returned in earnest. Hundreds of Copts were dismissed from the civil service and judiciary.

In February 1991, a Coptic pilot working for Sudan Airways was executed for illegal possession of foreign currency. Before his execution, he had been offered amnesty and money if he converted to Islam, but he refused. Thousands attended his funeral, and the execution was taken as a warning by many Copts, who began to flee the country.

Restrictions on the Copts' rights to Sudanese nationality followed, and it became difficult for them to obtain Sudanese nationality by birth or by naturalization, resulting in problems when attempting to travel abroad. The confiscation of Christian schools and the imposition of an Arab-Islamic emphasis in language and history teaching were accompanied by harassment of Christian children and the introduction of hijab dress laws. A Coptic child was flogged for failing to recite a Koranic verse. In contrast with the extensive media broadcasting of the Muslim Friday prayers, the radio ceased coverage of the Christian Sunday service. As the civil war raged throughout the 1990s, the government focused its religious fervour on the south. Although experiencing discrimination, the Copts and other long-established Christian groups in the north had fewer restrictions than other types of Christians in the south.

In 2005, the Sudanese government of National Unity (GNU) named a Coptic Orthodox priest to a government position, though the ruling Islamist party remained dominant. As of 2010, the Coptic Church in Sudan was officially registered with the government, and exempt from property tax.

After the 2018 Sudanese revolution, one Copt (Raja Nicola Issa Abdul-Masseh) was appointed in 2019 to the 11-member Transitional Sovereignty Council, which was convened as part of plan to transition Sudan to democracy. However, a military coup in 2019, led by Abdel Fattah al-Burhan and Mohamed Hamdan Dagalo, dissolved the council and halted the democratic transition. Christians, including Copts, were subjected to intensified persecution during a civil war that began in 2023. Many became refugees or were internally displaced.

There were reports as to an attack on 16 December 2023 by Rapid Support Forces militants on a Coptic monastery following which five clergy and four labourers were missing.

In 2023, Fikiru Mehari, a researcher for the Christian charity Open Doors, estimated that about 4% of Sudanese population was Christian; the majority of these were Roman Catholics and members of the Episcopal Church of Sudan with a "smattering" of Coptic Orthodox and Africa Inland Mission adherents.

A 2018 report by the Minority Rights Group said Sudanese Copts had previously estimated their numbers at 400,000 to 500,000, about 1% of the Sudanese population, but that emigration and conversion (including forced conversion) to Islam had decreased their number.

== Genetics ==
Hollfelder et al. (2017) analysed various populations in Sudan and observed that Egyptians and Copts showed low levels of genetic differentiation and lower levels of genetic diversity compared to other northeast African groups, including Arab and Middle Eastern groups that share ancestry with the Copts and Egyptians. The authors concluded that the Copts and the Egyptians have a common history linked to smaller population sizes, and that the Copts have remained relatively isolated since their arrival to Sudan with only low levels of admixture with local northeastern Sudanese groups.

== Notable Copts in Sudan ==
- Bishop Karas, a Coptic Orthodox bishop born in Sudan.
- Ra'ouf Mus'ad, a playwright, journalist and novelist born in Sudan.
- Raja Nicola Eissa Abdel-Masih, a judge and member of Sudan's Sovereignty Council that was sworn in during August 2019.

== See also ==
- Coptic diaspora
- Christianity in Sudan
- Copts in Egypt
- Copts in Libya
