= Ahmed Osman =

Ahmed Osman (Arabic: أحمد عثمان) may refer to:

- Ahmed Osman (author) (born 1934), Egyptian author about ancient Egypt
- Ahmed Osman (footballer) (born 1985), Bulgarian forward
- Ahmed Osman (politician) (born 1930), Moroccan politician and former PM
- Ahmed Osman (runner) (born 1988), American long-distance runner
- Ahmed Bilal Osman, Sudanese politician
