= Sudanese Journalists Syndicate =

Journalistic syndicate in Sudan

- نقابة الصحفيين السودانيين
- Sudanese Journalists Syndicate logo since 2023
- Abbreviation: SJS
- Formation: August 2022; 4 years ago
- Headquarters: At the cross of Ali Dinar St. with Barlaman Ave.
- Location: Khartoum, Sudan
- Members: +1,300
- Chair: Abdelmonim Abu Idries
- Website: sudanesejs.org facebook.com/sdjsofficial
- Building details

General information
- Coordinates: 15°36′27.15138″N 32°32′7.82848″E

The Sudanese Journalists Syndicate (SJS) (Arabic: نقابة الصحفيين السودانيين) is a professional organisation for journalists in Sudan. The syndicate was re-established in August 2022 after more than three decades of absence. The last independent journalists' union was dissolved in 1989 when Omar al-Bashir came to power after a coup d'état.

== History ==
In August 2022, the Sudanese Journalists Syndicate held elections in Khartoum, electing Abdelmonim Abu Idris, an Agence France-Presse journalist, as the new chair. The election committee allowed electronic voting, a first in Sudan, with 1,100 journalists voting from Sudan and 150 from outside. Despite the General Registrar of Sudanese Labour Organisations declaring the syndicate's establishment "illegal", the Unified Physicians’ Office and the Sudanese Teachers Committee supported the syndicate, citing international conventions ratified by Sudan supporting freedom of work and union organisation.

The Sudanese Journalists Syndicate was re-established after 33 years after it was dissolved in 1989 after Omar al-Bashir coup d'état.

However, the syndicate is facing opposition from the Registrar of Labor Organizations and some journalists affiliated with the toppled regime. The Registrar refused to approve the syndicate's documents and structures, citing violations of the Trade Union Law of 2010. Despite this, the syndicate, led by Abdelmonim Abu Idries, is determined to continue its work and confront the decision, drawing its legitimacy from Agreement No. 87 regarding freedom of association, which Sudan ratified under Law No. 1 of 2021.

The SJS rejected Israel–Sudan normalisation agreement that was signed in 2022.

=== Sudanese civil war (2023–present) ===
During the war the syndicate has been vocal against the deliberate targeting of journalists by rival military factions. The SJS reported on 10 August that 13 newspapers had ceased operations due to the conflict, while FM radio stations and channels also halted broadcasts, with journalists grappling with unpaid wages. The SJS financially supported 187 since the start of the war but reported that more than 600 journalist lost their jobs due to the war, with more than 200 being internally displaced.

In December 2023, The Sudanese Journalists Syndicate has called for international intervention to establish secure passages for civilians and journalists in Al-Jazirah State, following the Rapid Support Forces' (RSF) takeover of the state. The RSF's actions have led to distressing incidents, including forced confiscation of property and restrictions on movement. The syndicate has denounced these actions as "unarmed terrorism" and urged for pressure on the RSF to ensure safe passage for stranded civilians. The RSF Advisory Council has stated that it will not tolerate misbehaviour within its ranks and will use necessary force to protect the Sudanese people.

== Aims ==
The syndicate aims to defend the freedom and professionalism of the press, and contribute to the democratic and civil transformation in Sudan. The syndicate will also seek a minimum wage and health and social insurance for its members, and push for paid maternity leave for the first time.

The union consists of more than 1,300 members, and provide health coverage for its members. In February 2024, the syndicate trained 185 journalist in El-Gadarif.

The syndicate has been vocal against the deliberate targeting of journalists, and called for investigation into the killing, assaulting, and detention of journalists, including Halima Idris Salim.

== Awards and recognition ==
Ahead of World Press Freedom Day on 3 May, UNESCO announced the Sudanese Journalists Syndicate as laureate of the UNESCO/Guillermo Cano World Press Freedom Prize 2026. UNESCO Director-General Khaled El-Enany acknowledged the syndicate's "extraordinary courage and unwavering dedication" to provide "accurate, lifesaving information to their communities" in situations of "immense challenges." Chairperson of the SJS, Abdelmonim Abu Idries Ali, called the prize "a tribute to all Sudanese journalists who continue to defend truth and press freedom under extremely difficult and dangerous conditions."

== See also ==
- National Council for Press and Publication (Sudan)
- Ministry of Information (Sudan)
