= University of Alfashir =

Public university in Sudan

Coordinates: 13.6283°N 25.3219°E

- Type: Public university
- Established: February 1991; 35 years ago
- Location: El Fashir, North Darfur, Sudan
- Website: fashir.edu.sd
- Location in Sudan

The University of Alfashir is a public university in El Fasher, the capital city of the state of North Darfur, Sudan.

According to a United Nations report in November 2025, when the city of El Fasher was occupied and massacred by the Rapid Support Forces, the university had been turned into "a killing ground" where thousands of civilians had been sheltering, and there were "bodies piling in the streets and trenches dug in and around the city".

The university's name has been alternatively translated in English as Al Fashir University, Al Fasher University, El Fasher University, and El Fashir University.

== History ==
The university was created in 1990 by decree of President of Sudan Omar Hassan Ahmed Bashir, and was officially opened in February 1991 in premises west of al-Fashir airport and South of the al-Fashir school.

In 2011, there were 11,671 students enrolled, with 199 faculty members and 243 staff and technical assistants. It is a member of the Association of African Universities.

On 14 November 2025, Mona Rishmawi, a member of the United Nations Independent International Fact-Finding Mission for Sudan, reported that the Rapid Support Forces had "turned Al Fasher University into a killing ground" where thousands of civilians had been sheltering, and there were "bodies piling in the streets and trenches dug in and around the city".

== Research ==
Academic journals published by the University include the Al-Fashir University Journal of Humanities and the Al-Fashir University Journal of Applied Sciences.

In December 2004, a conference was held to discuss the effect of environmental degradation in causing conflict in Darfur. Faculty and students of the universities of Zalingei, al-Fashir and Nyala presented the findings of their research. They made recommendations that included closer cooperation between the UN and local universities, joint research projects and collaborative workshops.

On 28 October 2019, the Minister of Welfare and Social Development, Lena el-Sheikh Mahjoub, and the Deputy Secretary-General of the United Nations, Amina J. Mohammed, opened the Human Rights Knowledge Centre at al-Fashir University, as a cooperative project between the university and the United Nations Development Program (UNDP). The new centre is affiliated with the university's Faculty of Sharia and Law.

== Controversies ==
In October 2010, five students of the university loyal to the Sudan Liberation Movement led by Minni Minawi were arrested by police and were severely beaten before being released on bail. One of them was taken to the hospital for treatment of his injuries. In March 2011, two students were shot dead by police at the university, one from a range of less than one metre. They had been disobeying university authorities and participating in a political rally.

== See also ==
- Education in Sudan
