= Mustafa Osman Obeid Salim =

- مصطفى عثمان عبيد سالم
- Military career
- Allegiance: Sudan
- Rank: Lieutenant General
- Commands: Chief of Staff of the Sudanese Armed Forces
- Conflicts: South Kordofan & Blue Nile Conflict

Lieutenant General Mustafa Osman Obeid Salim (Arabic: مصطفى عثمان عبيد سالم) is a Sudanese Army officer who was Chief of Staff of the Sudanese Armed Forces.

Salim took command of the Armed Forces from Col. Gen. Ismat Abdel-Rahman at a handover ceremony on 25 June 2013. The changeover followed an attempted coup in November 2012, and also several military setbacks in the Sudan internal conflict, particularly in North Kordofan.

Obeid also served temporarily as the Sudanese Minister of Defence after taking over from Abdel Rahim Mohammed Hussein from 6 June until August 2015, when he was replaced with Ahmed Awad Ibn Auf.
