= Khaled Al-Aiser =

Sudan Minister of Information

Khaled Ali Al-Aiser
- خالد علي الاعيسر

Minister of Information (Sudan)
- Assuming office 2024
- Appointed by: Abdel Fattah al-Burhan
- Leader: Abdel Fattah al-Burhan
- Succeeding: Graham Abdel Qader

Personal details
- Party: Transitional Sovereignty Council
- Profession: Journalist

Khaled Ali Al-Aiser is a Sudanese Journalist and the Minister of Culture and Information of the Republic of Sudan.

== Career ==
Al-Aiser worked as a news editor for the London-based newspaper Al Zaman. He was also a presenter of the "Sudanese Opinion" at Al Sharqiyya.

In November 2024, he was appointed by the chairman of the Transitional Sovereignty Council, Lieutenant General Abdel Fattah al-Burhan as the Minister of Culture and information, where he succeeded Graham Abdel Qader.
