= Ra'ouf Mus'ad =

Egyptian Coptic journalist and playwright (1937–2025)

Ra’ouf Mus'ad (Arabic: رؤوف مسعد; sometimes known as Raouf Moussad-Basta) (20 March 1937 – 18 October 2025) was an Egyptian playwright, journalist and novelist who was born in Sudan to Coptic parents from Egypt. He moved to Egypt as a teenager and lived in various countries, both in the Middle East and in Europe, during his last 30 years. He eventually settled in Amsterdam with his Dutch wife and their children and took Dutch nationality.

== Life and career ==
Mus'ad came from a Coptic Christian background. Although his father's family was Coptic, the father was converted to Protestantism and became a Protestant minister. This religious, and more specifically Christian, background is an important part of the struggle with identity and belonging which becomes apparent in much of Mus'ad's writing.

He was born in Port Sudan, an Eastern Port on the Red Sea, in 1937 and lived the first years of his life there, before moving with his family to Wad Madani, to the southeast of Khartoum on the Blue Nile. From here he was sent to boarding school in Asyut in Middle Egypt, from where he returned to Wad Madani for the summer holidays before his father's work prompted the family to finally relocate to Luxor, Egypt. He studied journalism at the University of Cairo and graduated in 1960. It was in Cairo in 1954 that he first joined a small underground Marxist organisation initially called 'The Vanguard of the Workers and Fellaheen' and then later renamed 'The Party of the Workers and Fellaheen'.

In Cairo, the family moved around various areas, including al-Fajjala and Deir al-Malaak, in increasing poverty because his father had fallen seriously ill and could no longer work.

In Nasser's Egypt, Communist organisations were illegal and political activity was a dangerous pursuit punished with imprisonment. During the Suez Crisis of 1956 Mus'ad was arrested whilst handing out leaflets urging popular resistance to the foreign occupation of the Suez Canal Zone. He and his comrades were held for one night and then released. In December 1960 he was again arrested at the family flat in Deir al-Malaak after a naïve attempt to escape and disappear. He was held for seven months before being brought before a military court in Alexandria and sentenced for Years imprisonment. He spent another seven or eight months in custody in Alexandria before being moved to the oases prisons where he stayed until the mass releases of 1964. It was in prison that he met and befriended the writers Sonallah Ibrahim and Kamal al-Qalash, with whom he co-authored his first book In 1956.

After his release, in 1964, he started to work as a journalist and began his literary work: plays, stories and reportage. In 1970 he moved to Warsaw, where he studied theatrical production and got married, After he finished his scholarship.

Mus'ad lived in Poland for five years, during which time he visited many Soviet Bloc countries. This was the start of a long period of self-imposed exile which saw him establish himself in Baghdad (1975) and Beirut (1979) before returning briefly to Egypt in 1982. In Baghdad he worked in the Cinema and Theatre Foundation and met the woman who would become his next wife (after divorcing his Polish wife). In Lebanon he worked as a journalist for the newspaper as-Safir, and other magazines "El Louts the magazine of Afro-Asia Union of Writers" and lived in Beirut through the Israeli siege of 1982, where he worked in Beirut El Mesa'a the magazine of the Communist Workers Organisation which is what eventually forced him to leave Beirut and return to Egypt.

He moved to the Netherlands in 1990, to live with his new family after he met the Dutch lady in Cairo, who became the mother of his children and they married. He settled in Amsterdam, where he lived and worked ever after. He, in his own words, ‘attained a certain amount of fame’ and was active in the media, contributing to cultural and political debates, such as the consequences of the war in Iraq and taking part in a televised debate on censorship alongside the celebrated Arab poets Mahmoud Darwish and Adunis.

In 2004 he established in Amsterdam a small publishing house, in collaboration with a number of other Arab writers living outside the Arab world. Named ‘Muhajiroun’, the publisher is intended to print the works of Arab writers free from the difficulties of publishing in the Arab world, which Mus'ad saw as being beset by problems engendered by 'the state of decline in the Arab political scene'. Before that he established a publishing house in Cairo called "DAR Shouhdi " on the name of a communist leader who was killed in Nasser's prisons under torture with the help of Shouhdi's widow and his daughter Hanan. He stopped all other activities but writing.

== Death ==
Mus'ad died on 18 October 2025, at the age of 88.

== Bibliography ==
- إنسان السد العالي / The People of the High Dam (with Sunallah Ibrahim and Kamal al-Qalash), Cairo: Dar al-Katib al-Arabi, 1967
- يا ليل يا عين / O Night, O Eyes, Cairo: Ministry of Culture, 1970
- لومومبا والنفق مسرحيتان / Lumumba and The Tunnel – Two Plays, Cairo: al-Hay’a al-'aama lil-ta’lif wa-l-nashr, 1970
- صباح الخير يا وطن: شهادة من بيروت المحاصرة / Good Morning Homeland: A Testament from Beirut Under Siege, Cairo: Matbu'at al-Qahira, 1983
- بيضة النعامة / Ostrich Egg, London: Riad el-Rais Books, 1994 Five prints - last one "Elain Publishing -2011"
- مزاج التماسيح / Crocodile Mood, Cairo: Maktabat Madbuli, 2000" About Muslims -Coptic conflicts in Egypt ( out of print)
- في انتظار المخلص: رحلة إلى الأرض المحرمة / Waiting for the Saviour: A Journey to the Holy Land, Cairo: Maktabat Madbuli, 2000

A number of his mature works are either out of print, awaiting reprint or yet to be published at all. Below are those for which details are available.

- غواية الوصال / The Temptation of Being TogetherPublished -Cairo 1997 ( out of print )
- صانعة المطر / The RainmakerPublished -Cairo 1999 ( out of print)
- السودان: ستون عاما من الحنين / Sudan: Sixty Years of Longing Published in " Al- Quds Al- Arbi News paper October 2002
- سجون أبي / My Father’s Prisons. (With his daughter Yara)- not finished

إيثاكا /Iethaka .. based on the arresting of a group of Homosexuals in Egypt in a case known internationally as " Queen Boat " Cairo 2007 - Out of print

- لما البحر ينعس: مقاطع من حياتي / When the sea sleeps: Excerpts from My Life, Cairo: Dār al-Nasīm lil-Nashr wa-al-Tawzīʻ 2019

His novel Ostrich Egg has been translated into Spanish, French, Italian, Swedish and Dutch:

- Spanish: El Huevo del Avestruz, Raúf M. Basta. Translated by Salvador Peña Martín. Guadarrama: Ediciones del Oriente y del Mediterráneo. (Memorias del Mediterráneo) 1997
- French: L'Oeuf de l'autruche, Raouf Moussad-Basta. Translated by Yves Gonzalez-Quijano. Arles: Actes Sud. (Mémoires de la Méditerranée) 1997
- Italian: L'uovo di struzzo : memorie erotiche, Ra'uf Mus'ad Basta. Translated by Wasim Dahmash and Angelo Arioli. Rome: Jouvence. (Memorie del Mediterraneo) 1998
- Dutch: Het struisvogelei, translated by Dieuwke Poppinga and Richard van Leeuwen, published by De Geus
- Swedish:

He also wrote two adaptions of plays for the theater from two novels " El Lagnah by Sonallah Ibrahim and "the strange events " by Palestinian writer Emil Habiby and other plays for children.
