= Lena el-Sheikh Mahjoub =

Sudanese politician

Lena el-Sheikh Majhoub

Minister of Labour (or Welfare) and Social Development
- Incumbent
- Assumed office September 2019
- Prime Minister: Abdalla Hamdok

Lena el-Sheikh Omer Majhoub (also: Lina, al-Sheikh, Elsheikh) became the Sudanese Minister of Labour (or Welfare) and Social Development in early September 2019 in the Transitional Cabinet of Prime Minister Abdalla Hamdok, during the 2019 Sudanese transition to democracy.

== Education ==
El-Sheikh obtained her master's degree in development studies at the University of Manchester and a BSc degree at Ahfad University for Women.

== Academia and management ==
El-Sheikh became an academic staff member of the School of Management Studies at the Ahfad University for Women in 2002. El-Sheikh is interested in promoting corporate social responsibility. She is a co-founder of the Impact Hub Khartoum website, which aims to provide "a cooperative environment for entrepreneurs, intellectuals and innovators". At Impact Hub Khartoum, el-Sheikh holds the title of Head of Community Programs and aims to support sustainable development.

== Minister of Labour (or Welfare) and Social Development ==
In early September 2019, el-Sheikh became the Sudanese Minister of Labour (or Welfare) and Social Development in the Transitional Cabinet of Prime Minister Abdalla Hamdok, during the 2019 Sudanese transition to democracy. Other women leaders of Sudan during the transitional period include Chief Justice Nemat Abdullah Khair, and Sovereignty Council members Aisha Musa el-Said and Raja Nicola.
