= Abdullahi Mohammad Ahmad Hassan =

Sudanese politician (1928–2022)

- عبد الله محمد أحمد حسن

Personal details
- Born: January 1928 Bara, North Kordofan
- Died: 22 June 2022 (aged 94) United Kingdom
- Occupation: Politician

Abdullahi Mohammad Ahmad Hassan (Arabic: عبد الله محمد أحمد حسن; January 1928 – 22 June 2022) was a Sudanese politician who was a member of parliament, government minister and diplomat.

== Biography ==
Abdullahi Mohammad Ahmad Hassan was born in 1928 in the town of Bara in the state of North Kurdufan in Sudan. His family later moved and settled in Al-Ubayyid. At an early age he was sent to a Koranic school after which he followed the British education system in implementation by the British at the time. In 1947 he joined the newly established Hantoub Secondary School and later went on to study at and graduate in May 1955 from the Faculty of Arts at the University College of Khartoum.

After graduating he was posted as a history teacher in the town of Tonj in the south of Sudan. In August 1955 he was re-posted to as a history teacher at Khour Taqatt Secondary School just weeks before the first uprising of the Anyanya Movement in the South. In August 1958 he resigned his post as a teacher and moved to Khartoum where he started his business in commercial advertisements and feasibility studies. At this time he also carried out some journalism work for the two biggest newspapers at the time (Al-Umma and Al-Nile). In 1958 he opposed the new military government of General Aboud who seized power in a coup d'état. He was politically intimidated by the new government in Khartoum and his newly formed business suffered as a result. An opportunity arose in 1959 when he was approached by a local committee from Al-Ubayyid requesting him to establish and run an intermediate level school. He moved to Al-Ubayyid and establish Kurdufan Ahliya Intermediate School and ran it as its headmaster. He was approached in 1961 by Alsayeed Sidique Abdulrahman Almahadi to take charge and run the Almahadi Intermediate School for Girls in Omdurman. He took charge of the school the same year and overhauled it to become one of the most sought-after schools in the city. He resigned from the school in 1963 because of tensions with the head of the school board over the way financial funds were released by the board and over his strict discipline rules. After resigning he worked for the American Embassy until 1964 as their chief translator.

Abdullahi later chose to travel to the United Kingdom where he became a political observer, analyst, lecturer, author and columnist. He later lived in London but often spent time in Sudan. He died in the United Kingdom on 22 June 2022, at the age of 94.

== Political career ==
Abdullahi grew up in a Sudan that was under the occupation of the British Empire and from a young age joined in the sentiments of the youth that was disgruntled by the occupation, and was calling for the withdrawal of the British from Sudan. In March 1949 Babikir Karrar Al-Nour, Mohammad Yousif Mohammad, Mohammad Mohammad Ali, Adam Fadl-Allah and Yousif Hassan Said established the Islamic Liberation Movement at the University of Khartoum. The goal of the movement was to liberate Sudan from British occupation and to establish an Islamic state in the country. Babikr Karar Al-Nour was a former and a very active and popular student at Hantoob Secondary School. After the establishment of the movement, and in June 1949, Karrar visited Hantoob Secondary School to canvass for members for his movement. Abdullahi was one of the 30 students who joined the movement that day.

Before the establishment of the Islamic Liberation Movement, the Communist Party had a strong hold on the student union at the university and among the secondary schools in Sudan. Abdullahi joined the university in 1951, in 1952 the Islamic Liberation Movement won the student union election. Abdudllahi was a major recruitment driver for the movement and managed to recruit Hassan Al-Turabi, Mohammad Suar Aldahab, Ibrahim Abou Hasaneen, and Abdalhameed Abdalmajid. In 1954, Sudan politics was at a crossroads between the union of Sudan with Egypt or complete independence.

In 1954 two main political bodies were formed and later became a member of the Umma Party. Sudan officially achieved its independence in 1956; the first prime minister was Ismail al-Azhari and later on Abdallah Khalil. The democratic government was overthrown in a coup d'état by Ibrahim Abboud in 1958. Abdullahi joined the ranks of the opposition and in 1964 the students of the University of Khartoum, the civil servants and transport workers staged demonstrations and acts of civil disobedience that forced the government of Ibrahim Abboud to resign. Abdullahi was elected a second time as a Member of Parliament in the second Sudanese democracy under the leadership of al-Azhari, and the government of al-Azhari was overthrown in 1969 by Gaafar Nimeiry. Abdullahi again joined the opposition under the leadership of Sadiq al-Mahdi and was exiled to Saudi Arabia but later on moved to the United Kingdom. He returned to Sudan in 1979 after a National Reconciliation took place between the leaders of the opposition and Nimeiry.

Upon his return to Sudan he was appointed in the newly established office that overlooked the affairs of the Ansar. In 1984 Abdullahi was among the few politicians who Nimeiry arrested and imprisoned in Kober Prison until 6 April 1985 when Nimeiry was ousted by Abdel Rahman Swar al-Dahab. Swar Al-Dahab called upon the political parties to reform and elections took place a year later in 1986. Abdullahi was elected for the third time as a Member of Parliament representing the Umma Party.

In 1986 the Umma Party won the election but did not have the majority vote to have full control of the government. Sadiq al-Mahdi was elected the Prime Minister, after which he formed a coalition government. Abdullahi was appointed as Minister of Culture and Information and was the official spokesman for the government. Political turmoil brought the first reshuffle of the government and Abdullahi was appointed as Minister of Foreign Trade. The government was reshuffled a second time and he was appointed as Councilor and Advisor to the Prime Minister.

The unstable coalition government of Prime Minister Sadiq al-Mahdi was ousted by Omar Al-Bashir in a bloodless military coup on 30 June 1989. Abdullahi was arrested and imprisoned in Kober Prison but later released and was put under house arrest. Later he was appointed by Al-Bashir as Minister of Education, Culture and Information and the Official Government Spokesman and deputy Minister of Foreign Affairs and later appointed as ambassador of the Sudan to Italy, Spain, Greece and San Marino. During his time as ambassador he continually disagreed with the government and in 1995 was instructed to return indefinitely to the Sudan.
