= Sudan News Agency =

News agency of the Republic of Sudan

Coordinates: 15°36′24″N 32°32′15″E

Republic of the Sudan Sudan News Agency (SUNA)
- وكالة السودان للانباء (سونا)

Agency overview
- Headquarters: Khartoum
- Agency executives: Ibrahim Musa, (General Manager); Nimat Alshami, (Editor in Chief)
- Website: www.sunanews.net

Sudan News Agency, also known as SUNA, is the official news agency of Sudan. It provides news to other organizations in English, French, and Arabic.

== History and profile ==
The Sudan News Agency was established in 1970. It was officially inaugurated on the second anniversary of the May Revolution in 1971. Abdul Karim Mehdi was the first director of the SUNA. Then Mustafa Amin became the director of the agency. Amin served as the director until 1985.

In June 2023 a SUNA journalist, Abdel Rahman Warab, was reportedly abducted from his home by the paramilitary group Rapid Support Forces (RSF). He still remained missing in April 2025. In November 2025 RSF assassinated Taj Al-Sir Ahmed Suleiman, director of the SUNA office in the city of Al Fasher.

== See also ==
- Federation of Arab News Agencies (FANA)
- National Council for Press and Publication (Sudan)
