= Ismat Abdel-Rahman =

Sudanese general

Ismat Abdel Rahman Zine al-Abedin
- عصمت عبدالرحمن زين العابدين
- Military career
- Allegiance: Sudan
- Service years: Unknown – 2013
- Rank: Colonel General
- Commands: Sudanese Armed Forces
- Conflicts: Sudan internal conflict (2011–present); Sudan – South Sudan Border War

Colonel General Ismat Abdel Rahman Zine al-Abedin is a retired Sudanese Army officer who previously served as Chief of Staff of the Sudanese Armed Forces.

== Career ==
AbdelRahman served as Chief of Staff during the Sudan – South Sudan Border War, and threatened to punish South Sudan for damaging oil infrastructure in Heglig.

It was reported by unnamed sources to the Sudan Tribune that Zain narrowly escaped death in May 2013 when his convoy came under attack by the Justice and Equality Movement in South Kordofan.

The Sudanese Armed Forces spokesman Colonel al-Sawarmi Khalid Sa’ad announced Zain's retirement on 20 June 2013, claiming he had reached retirement age.

Zain el-Abideen handed over control of the Armed Forces to Lt. Gen. Mustafa Osman Obeid Salim at a handover ceremony on 25 June 2013. The changeover followed an attempted coup in November 2012, and also several military setbacks in the Sudan internal conflict, particularly in North Kordofan.
