= Tagadum =

Civilian coalition in Sudan

Tagadum تقدم
- Leader: Abdalla Hamdok
- Founded: October 2023
- Dissolved: February 2025

The Sudanese Coordination of Civil Democratic Forces (Tagadum) (Arabic: تنسيقية القوى المدنية الديمقراطية السودانية (تقدم)) was a pro-civilian-power coalition in Sudan which was involved in peace negotiations in the War in Sudan. Taqaddum claims to be neutral in the conflict. The coalition was founded in October 2023. It is led by former Prime Minister Abdallah Hamdok. In January 2024, Hamdok met the leader of the Rapid Support Forces Mohamed Hamdan Daglo in Addis Ababa. In April 2024, Hamdok met with President of France Emmanuel Macron in Paris.

On 24 September 2024, the Attorney-General of Sudan, Fath Al-Tayfour, formally accused Abdallah Hamdok and 15 other leaders of the Tagadum coalition of complicity in war crimes and genocide committed by the RSF and called for a red notice to be issued by Interpol. The Tagadum denied the charges. That same month, Tagadum's lawyer, Montaser Abdullah was abducted; he was later found the following month in prison having been charged with the same crimes. He was acquitted and released in October 2025.

Tagadum announced its dissolution on 10 February 2025, with Hamdok forming a new body, known as the Civil Democratic Alliance of the Forces of the Revolution (Sumoud), the following day. A rival Rapid Support Forces allied political movement, the Sudan Founding Alliance was formed a week later in Nairobi, Kenya.
