= Chief of Staff of the Sudanese Armed Forces =

Professional head of the Sudanese Armed Forces

Chief of the General Staff of the Sudanese Armed Forces
- رئيس هيئة الأركان العامة للقوات المسلحة السودانية
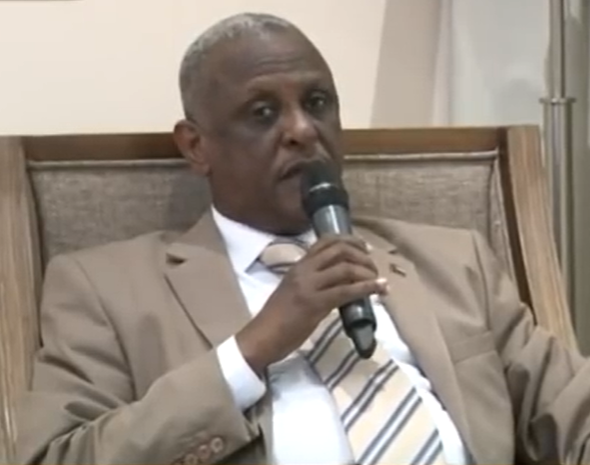
- Incumbent; Lieutenant General Yasser al-Atta since 2 April 2026
- Ministry of Defence
- Seat: General Command Headquarters, Khartoum (wartime seat in Port Sudan)
- Appointer: President of Sudan
- Formation: August 1954
- First holder: Major General Ahmed Mohammed

The Chief of Staff of the Sudanese Armed Forces (Arabic: رئيس هيئة الأركان العامة للقوات المسلحة السودانية) is the highest-ranking operational military officer of the Sudanese Armed Forces (SAF) and the primary military advisor to the Commander-in-Chief and the Minister of Defence, executing strategic directives across the armed forces. The incumbent is Lieutenant General Yasser al-Atta, who assumed office on 2 April 2026.

== History ==
Prior to Sudanese independence, the military command in Anglo-Egyptian Sudan rested with British Army officers serving as Commandant of the Sudan Defence Force (SDF), also known by the Arabic title of al-qa'id al-'amm ("the Leader of the Army") and was often referred to simply as "the Kaid". In August 1954, Major General Ahmed Mohammed became the first Sudanese officer appointed to lead the national army. Throughout the presidencies of Ibrahim Abboud, Jaafar Nimeiry, and Omar al-Bashir, the office underwent periodic structural reorganizations and was sometimes styled as Chief of the Joint General Staff.

== List of officeholders ==
Name	Term start	Term end	Notes
Major General Ahmed Mohammed	August 1954	June 28, 1956	
Major General Ibrahim Abboud	June 28, 1956	November 1958	
Lieutenant General Ishaq Ibrahim Omar	1 July 1989	4 July 1991	
Lieutenant General Hassan Abdel Rahman Ali	5 July 1991	6 November 1993	
Lieutenant General Ibrahim Suleiman Hassan	7 November 1993	16 October 1997	
Lieutenant General Sayed Ahmed Hamad Siraj	17 October 1997	27 February 1999	
Lieutenant General Abbas Arabi Abdallah	28 February 1999	1 March 2006	
General Haj Ahmed al-Jeili	2 March 2006	1 April 2008	
General Mohamed Abdel Qadir Nasr al-Din	2 April 2008	9 June 2010	
Colonel General Ismat Abdel-Rahman	11 June 2010	25 June 2013	
Lieutenant General Mustafa Osman Obeid Salim	25 June 2013	9 February 2016	
General Emad al-Din Mustafa Adawi	9 February 2016	27 February 2018	
Lieutenant General Kamal Abdel-Marouf	27 February 2018	11 April 2019	
Lieutenant General Hashem Abdel Muttalib	15 April 2019	July 2019	
General Mohamed Osman al-Hussein	July 2019	2 April 2026	
Lieutenant General Yasser al-Atta	2 April 2026	Present	

== See also ==
- Sudanese Armed Forces
- Ministry of Defence (Sudan)
- Transitional Sovereignty Council
