= 1998 Sudanese constitutional referendum =

27 May 1998

Results
Choice	Votes	%
Yes	10,472,888	96.97%
No	326,732	3.03%
Valid votes	10,799,620	98.76%
Invalid or blank votes	135,409	1.24%
Total votes	10,935,029	100.00%
Registered voters/turnout	11,935,029	91.62%

A constitutional referendum was held in Sudan on 27 May 1998. A new Constitution of Sudan was approved by 97% of voters, with turnout reported to be 92%. It was signed into law on 30 June.

== Results ==
Choice	Votes	%
For	10,472,888	96.97
Against	326,732	3.03
Total	10,799,620	100.00
Valid votes	10,799,620	98.76
Invalid/blank votes	135,409	1.24
Total votes	10,935,029	100.00
Registered voters/turnout	11,935,029	91.62
Source: African Elections Database
