= Rawda al-Haj =

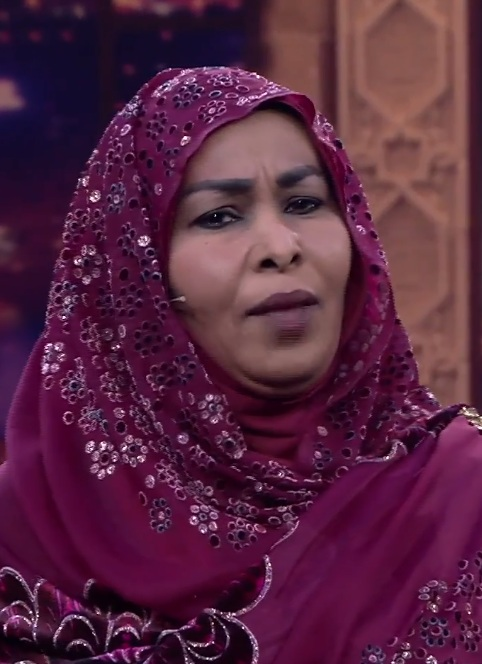
- Al-Haj in March 2017
- Born: 1969 (age 56–57) Kassala, Sudan
- Genre: Poetry

Rawda al-Haj Mohammad Osman is a Sudanese poet.

== Personal life ==
Al-Haj was born in Kassala, eastern Sudan. Her father was from Shendi and her mother from Kordofan.

== Career ==
Al-Haj has been recognized outside Sudan, being one of the first Sudanese poets to have works included in Arabic Language curricula across the Arab world.

Al-Haj has attended literary events in other countries, including Saudi Arabia and the UAE.

Al-Haj works as a broadcaster for Sudanese Radio and the Sudanese satellite channel Al-Shorooq TV, where she hosts "Ambassadors of Meanings" (سفراء المعاني). This program features intellectual and cultural discussions with prominent Sudanese and Arab figures in thought, poetry, and culture.

== Awards and honours ==
In 2005, she was awarded the title of Poet of Souk Okaz.
