= Ministry of Information (Sudan) =

Government ministry of Sudan

- Arabic: وزارة الإعلام

Agency overview
- Formed: 1930; 96 years ago
- Superseding agency: Ministry for Culture and Information
- Jurisdiction: Government of Sudan
- Headquarters: Khartoum, Khartoum State; 15°36′24″N 32°31′25″E
- Minister responsible: Khalid Ali Aleisir
- Website: mininfo.gov.sd

Map
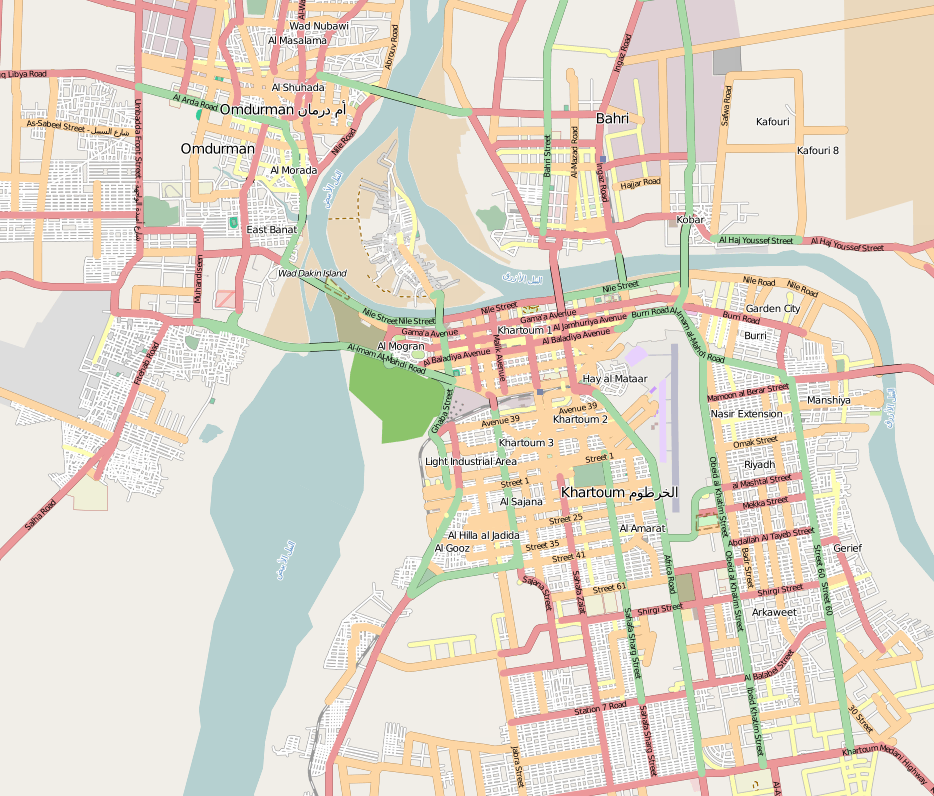
- HQ location in Khartoum
- yes

The Ministry of Information (Arabic: وزارة الإعلام) in Sudan, previously known as the Ministry of Culture and Information (Arabic: وزارة الثقافة والإعلام), is a governmental organisation that oversees the management and distribution of information related to the nation's affairs. The structure of this ministry has seen numerous alterations over time.

== History ==
The media landscape in Sudan began in 1930 with the establishment of the first press and publications law, marking the initiation of media activities under the Public Liaison Office of the Sudanese Government. This period also saw the introduction of touring cinema. Significant developments continued with the establishment of Radio Hona Omdurman in April 1940, shortly after the end of the World War II, and the creation of a Photography Department, followed by a Film Production Department within the Public Liaison Office. The media in Sudan has been deeply intertwined with the country's struggle for national liberation and identity since its inception.

Post-independence, the media sector was incorporated into the national ministry framework, reflecting its importance in the newly independent nation. In 1954, during the transitional period to self-rule, the Ministry of Social Affairs was created from the Liaison Office, with Yahya Al-Fadhli becoming the first minister in this role.

Significant milestones include partnerships with foreign entities like the McCorquodale Printing Press in 1955, and leadership changes that saw figures like Ziadeh Othman Arbab and Muhammad Ahmed Abu Sun guide the ministry through periods of political transition. The ministry evolved through various name changes and expansions in its scope, including the significant addition of the Television Administration in 1962 and the establishment of the National Theatre.

The media's governance structure underwent several transformations, reflecting the political shifts within Sudan, from the Ministry of Information and Labour (1964) to the Ministry of National Guidance, and eventually to the Ministry of Culture and Information. These changes encompassed the establishment of new departments and initiatives aimed at enriching the cultural and informational landscape of the country, including the National Council for Arts and Letters and various media training institutes.

Throughout the years, the ministry has overseen the creation of regional radio stations, the launch of National Unity Radio, and the establishment of departments focused on children's culture and media professional training. Leadership transitions have often coincided with broader political changes, influencing the ministry's direction and priorities. The era of national salvation (1989 to 2019) introduced further reorganisations and the establishment of additional regional radio stations, continuing the expansion and diversification of Sudan's media infrastructure.

== Vision ==
According to the ministry, the ministry's vision is to build an efficient, free, and capable information system. Its mission encompasses expressing the diversity of Sudan to reinforce national unity, establishing the concept of identity and belonging, deepening religious values, showcasing the positive image of Sudan externally, and advancing the information system. The ministry aims to develop a robust information infrastructure, establish a partnership between the state and the private sector in terms of information instruments, ensure all of Sudan is covered with information, and provide citizens with information.

== Ministers ==
#	Officeholder	Term start date	Time in office	Ministry name
1	Yahya Al-Fadhli	10 April 1954	1 years	Ministry of Social Affairs
2	Ziadeh Othman Arbab	2 February 1956	0 years	Ministry of Social Affairs
3	Muhammad Ahmed Abusen	July 1956	2 years	Ministry of Social Affairs
-	Vacant	17 November 1958		
4	Muhammad Talaat Farid	1959	2–3 years	Ministry of Information and Labour
5	Muhammad Nasr Othman	1962	1–2 years	Ministry of Information and Labour
6	Khalaf Allah Babakir	October 1964	0 years	Ministry of Information and Labour
7	Saleh Mahmoud Ismail	February 1965	0 years	Ministry of Information and Social Affairs
8	Abdul Rahman Al-Nour	June 1965	0–1 years	Ministry of Information and Social Affairs
9	Daoud Abdel Latif Ibrahim	1966	0 years	Ministry of Information and Social Affairs
10	Ahmed Abdul Rahman al-Mahdi	30 July 1966	0–1 years	Ministry of Information and Social Affairs
11	Al-Sadiq al-Siddiq al-Mahdi	1967	0 years	Ministry of Information and Social Affairs
12	Abdel Majid Abu Hasbo	May 1967	1–2 years	Ministry of Information and Social Affairs
13	Mahjoub Othman	25 May 1969	0 years	Ministry of National Guidance
14	Omar Haj Musa	28 October 1969	3 years	Ministry of National Guidance
14	Omar Haj Musa	24 January 1970	3 years	Ministry of Information and National Guidance
14	Omar Haj Musa	9 May 1973	3 years	Ministry for Culture and Information
15	Bona Malwal	10 November 1976	1 years	Ministry for Culture and Information
16	Ali Muhammad Shamo	29 July 1978	1 years	Ministry for Culture and Information
17	Ismail Haj Musa	17 August 1979	1 years	Ministry for Culture and Information
18	Ahmed Abdulrahman	1981	1–2 years	Ministry for Culture and Information
19	Muhammad Othman Abu Saq	1 December 1982	1 years	Ministry of Guidance and National Information
20	Muhammad Khojali Salihin	June 1983	1 years	Ministry of Culture and Information
21	Muhammad Bashir Hamed	April 1985	1 years	Ministry of Culture and Information
22	Mohammed Tawfik	5 May 1986	1 years	Ministry of Culture and Information
23	Maamoun Mahjoub Sinada	June 1987	0 years	Ministry of Culture and Information
24	Abdullah Mohammed Ahmed	16 May 1988	0 years	Ministry of Culture and Information
25	Suleiman Abu Saleh	26 March 1989	0 years	Ministry of Culture and Information
(16)	Ali Muhammad Shamo	9 July 1989	0 years	Ministry of Culture and Information
(20)	Muhammad Khojali Salihin	April 1990	0 years	Ministry of Culture and Information
(24)	Abdullah Mohammed Ahmed	January 1991	2 years	Ministry of Culture and Information
26	Abdel Basset Sabdarat	30 October 1993	2 years	Ministry of Culture and Information
27	Al-Tayeb Ibrahim Muhammad Khair	5 June 1996	1 years	Ministry of Culture and Information
28	Ghazi Salah al-Din al-Atabani	March 1998	2–3 years	Ministry of Culture and Information
29	Mahdi Ibrahim Mohammed	2001	0–1 years	Ministry of Information and Communication
30	Alzahawi Ibrahim Malik	2002	1–2 years	Ministry of Culture and Information
-	Unknown	June 2004	0–1 years	Ministry of Culture and Information
(30)	Alzahawi Ibrahim Malik	2005	1–2 years	Ministry of Culture and Information
31	Kamal Mohamed Obeid	2007	2–3 years	Ministry of Culture and Information
-	Unknown			Ministry of Culture and Information
(31)	Kamal Mohamed Obeid	June 2010	1–2 years	Ministry of Culture and Information
32	Ahmed Bilal Osman	8 June 2012		Ministry of Culture and Information
33	Al-Tayib Hassan Badawi	2014	3–4 years	
34	Omar Suliman	2018	0–1 years	
35	Rawda al-Haj	2019	0 years	
36	Faisal Mohammed Saleh	5 September 2019	1 years	Ministry of Information
37	Hamza Baloul	9 February 2021	0 years	Ministry of Information, Culture, and Tourism
38	Graham Abdelkader	25 October 2021	3 years	Ministry of Information
39	Khaled Al-Aiser	3 November 2024	2 years	Ministry of Culture and Information

== See also ==
- Cabinet of Sudan
- National Council for Press and Publication (Sudan)
