= Asma Mohamed Abdalla =

Sudanese diplomat

- أسماء محمد عبد الله
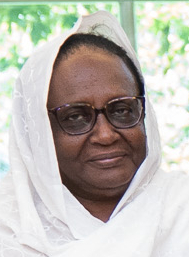
- Asma in 2019

Foreign Minister of Sudan
- In office 1 September 2019 – 9 July 2020
- Prime Minister: Abdalla Hamdok
- Preceded by: al-Dirdiri Mohamed Ahmed
- Succeeded by: Omer Ismail (acting)

Personal details
- Born: 1946 (age 79–80) Khartoum, Anglo-Egyptian Sudan
- Education: University of Khartoum
- Occupation: diplomat

Asma Mohamed Abdalla (also: Asmaa, Abdallah, Abdullah; Arabic: أسماء محمد عبد الله) is a Sudanese diplomat. She became Sudan's first female Minister of Foreign Affairs in early September 2019 in the Transitional Cabinet of Prime Minister Abdalla Hamdok, during the 2019 Sudanese transition to democracy.

== Early life and education ==
Asma was born in 1946 in Khartoum. She graduated in 1969 from the University of Khartoum after studying economics and political science.

== Diplomatic career ==
Asma was a Sudanese ambassador, employed by the Sudanese Ministry of Foreign Affairs, prior to the Omar al-Bashir presidency. She was one of the first three women employed by the Foreign Ministry. Asma was dismissed from the Ministry following the 1989 Sudanese coup d'état that brought Omar al-Bashir to power and persecuted by the new government.

According to UNICEF scanned paper records of 1990, Asma was Fourth Vice-chairman of the UNICEF Executive Board during 1990/1991. A 2010 UNICEF list of the history of the UNICEF Executive Board disputes this, claiming that Chipo Zindoga from Zimbabwe was Fourth Vice-chairman during 1990/1991 and 1991/1992 and that Asma was never a member of the UNICEF Executive Board, up to and including 2010.

In response to her persecution by the al-Bashir government, Asma chose to live in exile in Morocco. While living in Morocco, Asma worked as a consultant to international organisations including Islamic Educational, Scientific and Cultural Organization (ISESCO).

== 2018–19 Sudanese protests ==
During the 2018–19 Sudanese protests, Asma joined the Forces of Freedom and Change (FFC), becoming a member of the FFC's Foreign Policy team.

== Minister of Foreign Affairs ==
Asma was added by Prime Minister Abdalla Hamdok to the list of candidate ministers provided to him by the FFC, on the grounds of her role in opposing the al-Bashir government, her support of the protests calling for political change, and her diplomatic experience. Hamdok chose her ahead of the other candidates. Asma thus became Sudan's first female Minister of Foreign Affairs in early September 2019 in the Transitional Cabinet of the 2019 Sudanese transition to democracy.
