= Ahmed Bilal Osman =

Sudanese politician

Ahmed Bilal Osman is a Sudanese politician. He was appointed to the position of Minister of Culture and Information by President Omer Al-Bashir on June 8, 2012, and took his oath of office on June 11 at the Republican Palace. He had previously worked as an Adviser of the President, representing the Democratic Unionist Party, before president Omar al-Bashir relieved all advisers in June 2012. He has also headed the High Committee of North Kordufan. In July 2011 he administered the first dose of Rotarix as part of an immunization drive led by the GAVI Alliance.
