= Jamal Aldin Omar =

Sudanese politician (1960–2020)

Jamal Aldin Omar (January 1960 – 25 March 2020) was a general in the Sudanese Armed Forces.

He was also known as Jamal Aldin Omer, Jamal Aldin Omar Ibrahim, and Jamal Al-Din Omar Mohammed. Other transliterations of his name include: Gamal al-Din Omar, Jamal-Eddin Omer Ibrahim, and Gamal al-Din Omer Ibrahim.

Omar served as chief of Sudan's military intelligence under Omar al-Bashir until September 2018, when he was replaced by Mustafa Mohamed Mustafa. After al-Bashir was deposed, Omar became a member of the Transitional Military Council in May 2019, succeeding Mustafa Mohamed Musfata, and retaking the post of military intelligence chief. Omar was appointed Defence Minister in September 2019 by Prime Minister Abdalla Hamdok. Omar died on 25 March 2020, while attending peace talks in Juba, South Sudan.
