= Faisal Saleh =

Sudanese journalist and politician

Faisal Mohamed Saleh
- فيصل صالح
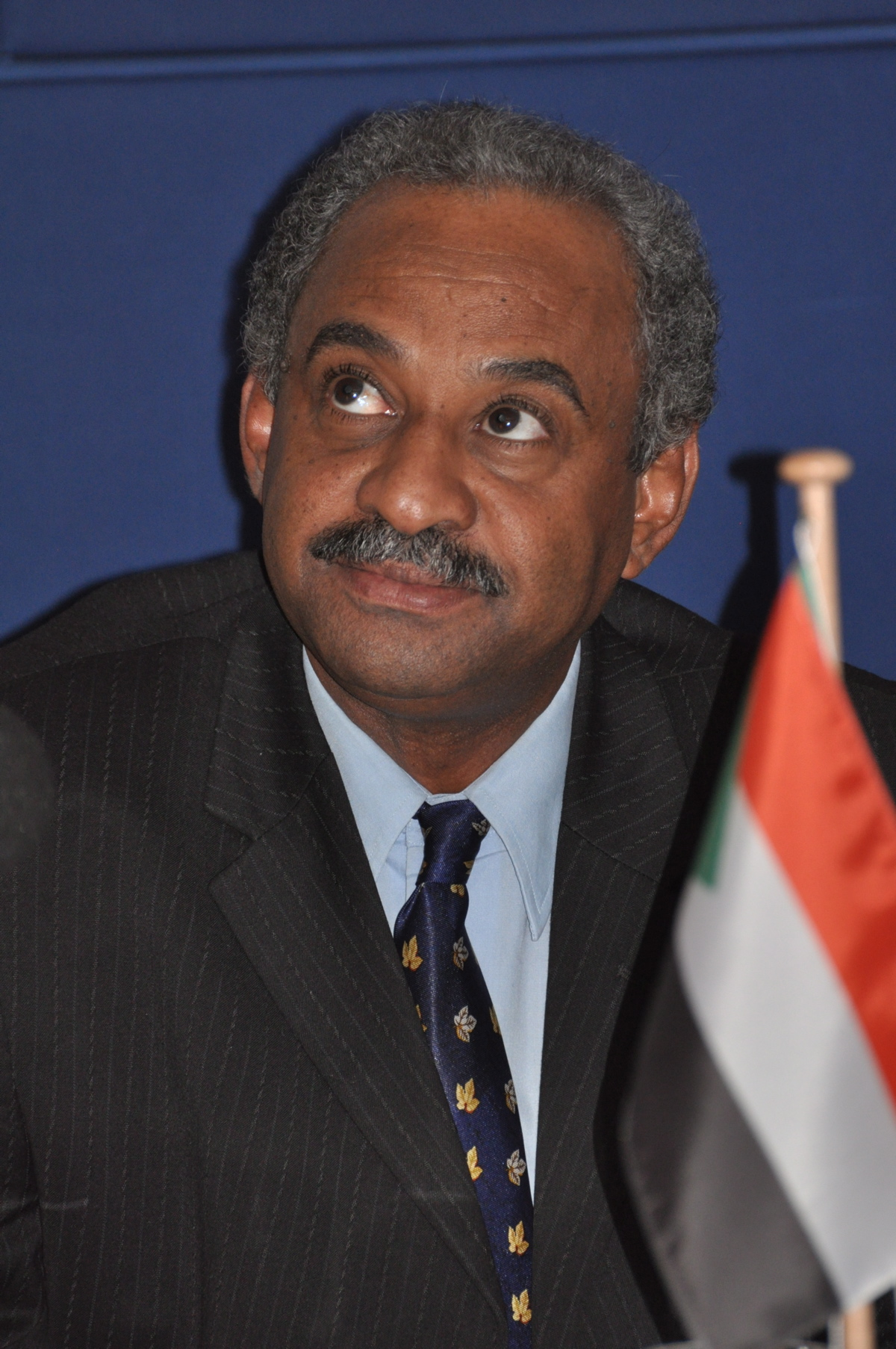
- Saleh in 2009

Minister of Culture and Information
- Incumbent
- Assumed office September 2019-October 2021
- Prime Minister: Abdalla Hamdok

Personal details
- Occupation: Journalist
- Known for: 2012 arrest

Faisal Mohamed Saleh (or Salih; Arabic: فيصل صالح) is a Sudanese journalist and columnist for several national papers. In September 2019, Saleh was nominated as head of the national Culture and Media Council of Sudan as part of the Cabinet of Sudan during the 2019 Sudanese transition to democracy.

== Education ==
Saleh graduated from al-Azhar University with a degree in journalism and from the University of Wales with a master's degree.

== Journalism ==
Saleh heads Teeba Press, an NGO which trains journalists, and is a former editor of the newspaper Al-Adwa. In the early years of the rule of president Omar al-Bashir, he was detained for several months for his critical reporting of the government. Along with several other journalists, he faced criminal charges in June 2011 after reporting on the alleged rape in custody of activist Safiya Ishag by agents of Sudan's National Intelligence and Security Service.

=== Peter Mackler Award ===
In 2013, Saleh received the Peter Mackler Award, an award for journalists named after Peter Mackler, chief editor for North America for Agence France-Presse for 29 years up to his death in 2008. The reasons cited for giving the award to Saleh included his "determination to see a free press unafraid to document government repression take root in his homeland" during the presidency of Omar al-Bashir.

== 2012 arrest ==
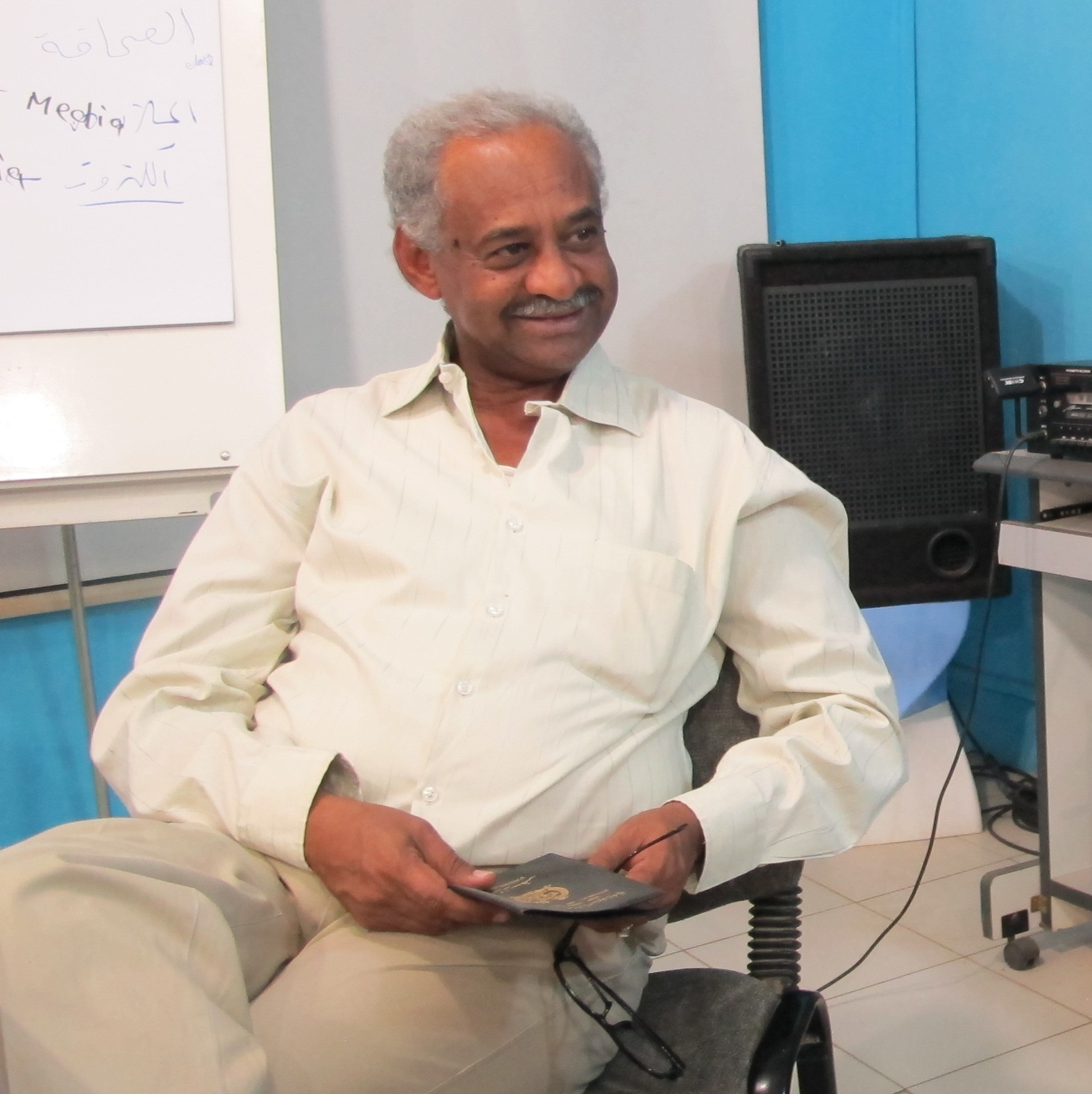
Saleh in 2015 at the office of Teeba Press in Khartoum

Saleh gave an interview to Al Jazeera on 19 March 2012 in which he criticized a speech by al-Bashir. Saleh told the interviewer that he felt al-Bashir's government was raising tensions with South Sudan to make it a "scapegoat" for the South Kordofan rebellion in an effort to deflect the administration's own failures to deal with the rebellion's causes. Saleh also argued that the Sudanese government should attempt to solve the crisis with diplomacy rather than force, rather than risk the political and humanitarian consequences of an armed conflict.

On 25 April, Saleh was ordered to report to Sudanese police for questioning; the police reportedly also warned him against speaking further to foreign media. After twelve days of interrogation, Saleh was charged with "crimes against the state" as well as new charges of defamation for his reporting the Safia Ishaag rape case, for which he had been already arrested the previous year.

The arrest led Amnesty International to name him a prisoner of conscience, "imprisoned solely for the peaceful expression of his beliefs". The Arabic Network for Human Rights Information also condemned the arrest, describing it as part of "the severe decline of freedom of opinion and expression and freedom of the press" in Sudan. The Doha Centre for Media Freedom criticized Saleh's interrogations and detention, calling them "harassment" designed "to prevent Saleh from doing his work as a journalist". The New York-based Committee to Protect Journalists also called on Sudanese authorities to "release Saleh immediately and stop harassing him." Reporters Without Borders described itself as "outraged at the violence and pressure" against Saleh, describing it as "further proof of the repressive attitude towards the press on the part of the Khartoum government, whose intention is to silence all dissident voices". Front Line Defenders called for the charges against Saleh to be dropped, and stated that they appeared to be "part of an ongoing campaign of judicial harassment and intimidation against the human rights defender". The International Federation of Human Rights called "on the Sudanese authorities to put an end to the judicial harassment faced by Mr. Salih", and launched a letter-writing campaign on his behalf.

A group of journalists held a protest on 17 May in front of the headquarters of Sudan's Press and Publication Council to show solidarity with Saleh and calling for an "end to pre-censorship and restrictions against press and journalists". Saleh's court hearing was scheduled for 11 June 2012.

== Cabinet Member ==
In September 2019, Saleh became the Sudanese Minister of Culture and Information as part of the Cabinet of Sudan during the 2019 Sudanese transition to democracy.

== 2021 arrest ==
On 25 October 2021, Saleh was confirmed to be among the senior Sudan government officials arrested following the 2021 Sudan coup which overthrew the Sudan government.
