= Aisha Musa el-Said =

Sudanese translator and politician

- عائشة موسى السعيد

Member of the Sovereignty Council of Sudan
- In office 21 August 2019 – 12 May 2021
- Prime Minister: Abdalla Hamdok
- Preceded by: Abdel Fattah al-Burhan (as Chairman of the Transitional Military Council and head of state)

Personal details
- Born: El Obeid, North Kordofan, Sudan
- Spouse: Mohammed Abdul-Hayy
- Occupation: translator
- Known for: women's rights activism in Sudan

Aisha Musa el-Said (also Asha, Ayesha, Mousa, Elsaid, El Said, Saeed, Arabic: عائشة موسى السعيد) is a Sudanese translator and politician who served as a member of the Sovereignty Council of Sudan, the country's collective head of state, between August 2019 and May 2021. Musa was one of six civilians to hold seats in the 11-member transitional government council, which took power following the Sudanese Revolution; the remaining five members were nominated by the Sudanese military. Musa and fellow Sovereignty Council member Raja Nicola are the first two women in modern Sudanese history to hold the role of a head of state. Musa is known as a women's rights activist and for advocating for improved, fairer and more decentralized education, and for the practical application of acquired knowledge in Sudan.

== Education ==
Musa holds a master's degree from the University of Manchester. In 1965, she studied and obtained a two-year TEFL diploma at the University of Leeds in England. During the visit, she carried out research related to her doctoral studies and held the role of Secretary of the Sudanese Students Society.

== Academic roles ==
Musa has been a member of the Trustees of the al-Tayeb Salih International Awards committee. In January 2018, she was Chairperson of the Ghada Award for Young Writers Committee.

In January 2018, Musa held professorship positions in two Saudi universities.

== Activism ==
Musa was active in the women's right movement in Sudan for several decades.

== Sovereignty Council ==
Under the August 2019 Draft Constitutional Declaration, Musa was nominated by the Forces of Freedom and Change alliance (FFC) as one of the civilian members of the Sovereignty Council, the collective head of state of Sudan during the 39-month transition period that began in August 2019. She resigned from the Council in May 2021, saying that civilian voices on the council were not being heard.

== Points of view ==
In 2018, Musa argued that the "socially unique case" of Sudan's mixed Arabic–African identity and ethnicity had been mismanaged since Sudan became an independent state, stating, "This stable understanding and build of a Sudanese identity was shattered by misgivings and mistakes created by different governments since Independence." She stated that governments of Sudan had been "the real heirs of colonial policies" and had failed to encourage education. She said that the governments had centralised "administration and knowledge, and the unfair distribution of the tools and means of a better life stunted 'production' even of the vital needs of people in distant areas of the vast country and people exodused to Khartoum to acquire ready made stuff."

Musa argued against purely theoretical knowledge, stating, "Knowledge, without field work and atmosphere for practical application, stays a philosophy for theoretical contemplations. ... Available technologies and end products at hand are abused. Because knowledge production and investing of products are complementary; otherwise we end up trading in antiques."

Musa argues that her field of expertise, translation, is an independent art and a field of applied linguistics, and that translators are "creative and experts of rhetoric, the Art of cloning, paraphrasing, transliterating". She favours good coordination between a translator and writer, and faithfulness of the translator to the original quality of the text.
