= National Council for Press and Publication (Sudan) =

Governmental institute in Sudan

- Arabic: المجلس القومي للصحافة والمطبوعات الصحفية

Agency overview
- Formed: 1993; 33 years ago
- Superseding agency: Ministry of Information
- Jurisdiction: Government of Sudan
- Headquarters: Khartoum, Khartoum State
- Website: ncpp.sd

National Council for Press and Publication (NCPP) (Arabic: المجلس القومي للصحافة والمطبوعات الصحفية) is a governmental institute in Sudan, overseeing Sudanese media publications. NCPP was established in 1993 with the purpose of regulating and governing the press. Through elements of the Sudanese penal code, National Forces Security act and most notably the 2009 Press and Publications Act, NCPP is able to shut down or suspend newspapers without a court order.

Besides regulating publications NCPP requires all journalists and newspapers to be registered. Journalist have to pass a test prior to receiving a license to conduct journalism. NCPP is considered highly biased towards the government, with most of its members being appointed by the president of Sudan. The NCPP works in collaboration with the Ministry of Information and the National Intelligence and Security Service (NISS). On 21 December 2016, NISS seized print runs of five different newspapers without any given reason. These seizures are considered as punishment for the newspapers publishing articles impacting public security. The suspensions affect newspapers heavily, with one of the publishers, Al-Taghyeer, having to suspend publishing and lay off its staff.

During the Sudanese protests in January 2019 NCPP filed a complaint against Al-Arabiya for reportedly pubslihing "fake news". During the unrest numerous journalist were attacked by the NISS. According to the Reporters without Borders, the NCPP seizured over 52 publications during this time.

In May 2025 during the Sudanese Civil War, the Minister of Culture held a workshop in Port Sudan to discuss amendments to the 2009 press and publications law that had allowed NCPP to shutdown newspapers without a due process. During the workshop the mandate of NCPP was suggested to expanded to include electronic media and publishing. The workshop also called for training journalists on national security concepts and key national issues.
