= Raja Nicola =

Sudanese lawyer and judge, former member of the Transitional Sovereignty Council

Raja Nicola Eissa Abdel-Masih
- رجاء نيقولا عيسى عبد المسيح

Member of the Transitional Sovereignty Council
- In office 11 November 2021 – 5 July 2022
- In office 21 August 2019 – 25 October 2021

Personal details
- Born: Omdurman
- Occupation: judge

Raja Nicola Eissa Abdel-Masih (Arabic: رجاء نيقولا عيسى عبد المسيح) is a former civilian member of the Transitional Sovereignty Council, Sudan's collective transitional head of state. She was chosen for this position as one of six civilians to hold seats in the original 11-member council. She was the only one of them whose name was agreed upon through a consensus between the Forces of Freedom and Change alliance (FFC) and the Transitional Military Council (TMC), as was foreseen under the terms of the Draft Constitutional Declaration of August 2019. She was the only civilian member of the TSC to have been reinstated by Chairman Abdel Fattah al-Burhan after he seized power in the 2021 military coup d'état.

As such she is, along with fellow council member Aisha Musa el-Said, one of the first two women in modern Sudanese history to hold the role equivalent to a federal minister and is also the first Christian (as a member of the Coptic minority) to hold such a high political office in the country. As a judge, she is responsible in particular for the legal system in Sudan.

== Education ==
Nicola was born in Omdurman and graduated in 1980 with a Bachelor of Laws from Cairo University.

== Career ==
Being a lawyer by education, Nicola also served as a judge. She worked in the Sudanese Ministry of Justice from 1982 until her 2019 appointment to the Sovereignty Council.

== Minority rights ==
In September 2012, Nicola said that religious rights of Christians in Sudan asserted under the 2005 Interim National Constitution were not fully implemented, with some employers not giving Christians their legal two hours' right to prayer and schools not allowing Christian children to be absent on Sunday for attendance at religious services.

Nicolas also stated in September 2012 that the Special Commission for the Protection of the Rights of Non-Muslims in Khartoum that had been created in 2007 had been active in advocating to law enforcement agencies on the behalf of non-Muslims arrested for allegedly violating Shari'a law, and in publishing regular reports and recommendations to the government in relation to non-Muslims' rights. She stated that the Commission had been closed down in 2011, against the wishes of the Christian community, after the secession of South Sudan.

In a meeting with the Sudanese Solidarity Organization Against Racial Discrimination (SSOARD) in June, 2021, she stressed the need for the implementation of "all legislations and laws against racial discrimination".

== Transitional Sovereignty Council ==
The August 2019 Draft Constitutional Declaration that defines the state bodies and procedures for the 2019 Sudanese transition to democracy creates a Transitional Sovereignty Council as the collective head of state of Sudan. The signing of the July Political Agreement and the Draft Constitutional Declaration by the Forces of Freedom and Change alliance (FFC) and the Transitional Military Council (TMC) followed half a year of sustained civil disobedience and the 3 June Khartoum massacre. The FFC and other civilian groups had insisted on a fully civilian government. The Draft Constitutional Declaration compromised by creating a Transitional Sovereignty Council with five civilians chosen by the FFC, five military chosen by the TMC, and a sixth civilian to give the TSC a formal majority of civilians. The sixth civilian had to be mutually agreed on by the FFC and the TMC.

In late August, Raja Nicola was nominated by the FFC and the TMC as their mutually agreed-on sixth civilian member of the TSC. The choice of Nicola, as a member of the Sudanese Coptic community, was seen as a concrete measure for social diversity, in particular for Sudanese Christians.

Shortly after being sworn in as a member of TSC, she described her vision of the task of the council, stating,

We only asked the Sudanese people to be patient as we may all know that the destruction that happened during the past 30 years is huge and may not be addressed in only three years. But we will double our efforts and work together in the council to meet all the demands of the revolution.

— Raja Nicola, interview with Middle East Eye

Nicolas was Removed from the TSC on 5 July 2022 along with several other civilian members.
