= Transitional Military Council (2019) =

Four-month Sudanese military junta after President Omar al-Bashir's overthrow

The Transitional Military Council (TMC) was the military junta governing Sudan that was established on 11 April 2019, after the 2019 Sudanese coup d'état that took place during the Sudanese Revolution, and was formally headed by Abdel Fattah al-Burhan, Inspector of the Sudanese Armed Forces, after Ahmed Awad Ibn Auf resigned as leader one day following the coup.

The TMC and the Forces of Freedom and Change alliance (FFC) signed a political agreement on 17 July. On 4 August, a constitutional declaration, which followed up on the 17 July agreement, was completed. The agreements provided for the transfer of power to a new body known as the Sovereignty Council and to other transitional state bodies.

== Structure and members ==
Lieutenant General Mohamed Hamdan Dagalo ("Hemetti") was formally the deputy leader but seen as the de facto real leader.

On 21 August 2019, the Sovereignty Council was established, officially dissolving the TMC and transferring power to the new council.

== Leadership ==
Hemetti, formally the deputy leader of the Council, is the commander of the Rapid Support Forces, and as such, is seen by The Washington Post as holding more real power in the Council than al-Burhan. The RSF is the immediate successor organisation to the Janjaweed militia.

The Council's media spokesman is Major General Shams Ad-din Shanto. Some of the Council's other known members were General Galaledin Alsheikh, a former deputy director of security, Lieutenant General Al-Tayeb Babakr Ali Fadeel, who led the public order police, and Lieutenant General Omar Zain al-Abidin served as the leader of the junta's "political committee." All three tendered their resignations on 24 April. General Gamal Omar of the TMC commented publicly on the 30 June 2019 mass demonstrations, attributing the responsibility for ten deaths to the protest organisers.

== 3 June 2019 Khartoum massacre ==
On 3 June 2019, the TMC's security forces, including the Rapid Support Forces (RSF) led by TMC deputy leader Hemeti, killed about 100 civilians and injured hundreds of others in the Khartoum massacre. The Sudanese Professionals Association (SPA) described the TMC leaders as being "deep to their knees in the blood of the innocent in Darfur, Nuba Mountains and Blue Nile, in addition to Khartoum and other cities and towns" and organised a 3-day general strike.

== Negotiations and power transfer ==
=== April–June negotiations with civil society ===
Major General Shanto, in a press conference on 14 April, stated that the Council was inviting the opposition and protestors to name a civilian government (except for the Ministries of Defense and Interior) and a prime minister to lead it, which the junta would then "implement".

On 12 June, the Forces of Freedom and Change (FFC) alliance prepared a list of eight civilian members for a 15-member transitional governmental council to replace the TMC, including three women, in addition to Abdalla Hamdok, who was Deputy Executive Secretary of the United Nations Economic Commission for Africa from 2011 to October 2018, as prime minister.

== Planned power transfer to Sovereignty Council ==
On 5 July 2019, the TMC and the FFC agreed on a Sudanese transition to democracy deal, including an 11-member sovereign council with five military members, five civilian members, and one civilian chosen by consensus; a civilian cabinet; a legislative council; an investigation into the Khartoum massacre and related events; and a legal team to formalise the plan. The new Sovereignty Council would be led by a military person for 21 months and by a civilian for 18 months. On 7 July, al-Burhan, head of the TMC, stated on television that in the context of the transition deal, the TMC would be dissolved.

On 4 August, the TMC, represented by Hemetti, and the FFC, represented by Ahmed Rabee, signed the Draft Constitutional Declaration, which states 70 legal articles defining the transfer of power from the TMC to the Sovereignty Council and other transitional state bodies. The signing of the Draft Constitutional Declaration received wide international attention.

== Attempted anti-TMC coups d'état ==
The TMC claimed several times during 2019 that a coup d'état attempt had been foiled and that those responsible had been arrested.

As of 25 July 2019, the TMC had not named the alleged coup plotters of the first four coup attempts.

On 12 July, Gamal Omar of the TMC reported the fourth coup attempt, stating that twelve army and General Intelligence Service (GIS) officers had attempted a coup d'état against the TMC, without naming the alleged conspirators.

On 25 July, the TMC stated that a combined military-Islamist coup attempt had occurred. The TMC stated that it had arrested the head of the Joint Chiefs of Staff, Lieutenant-General Hashim Abdel Muttalab Ahmed; Major-General Nasr al-Din Abdel Fattah; former Foreign Minister, Ali Ahmed Karti; the commander of the Central District, Major-General Bahar Ahmed; former Minister of Minerals, Kamal Abdel Latif; and Secretary-General of "the Islamic Movement", Zubair Ahmed al-Hassan.

== See also ==
- Transitional Military Council (1985)
- Sudanese Revolution
