= Abdalla Hamdok =

Prime Minister of Sudan (2019–2021, 2021–2022)

- عبد الله حمدوك الكناني
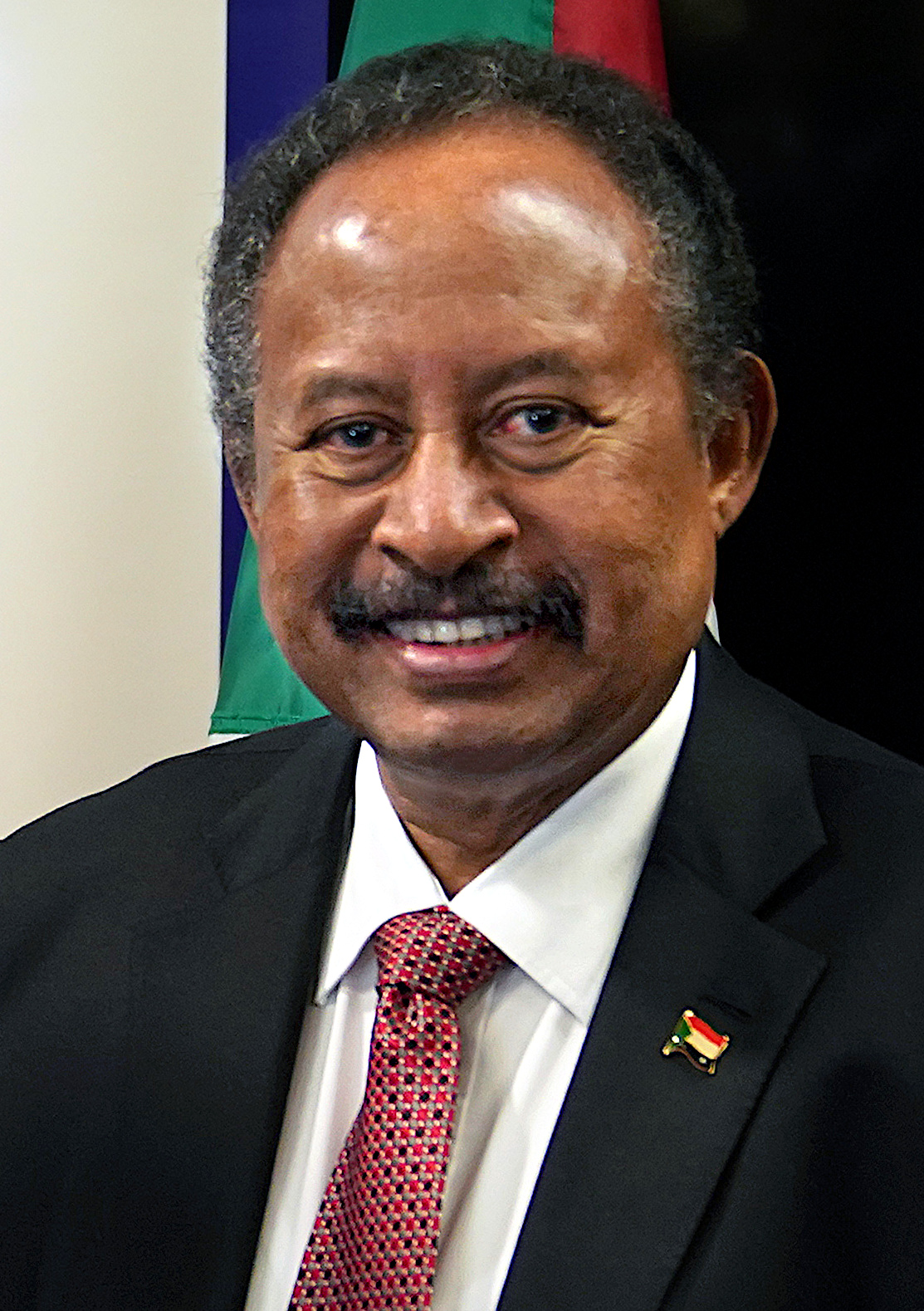
- Hamdok in 2019

15th Prime Minister of Sudan
- In office 21 November 2021 – 2 January 2022
- President: Sovereignty Council
- Preceded by: Himself
- Succeeded by: Osman Hussein (acting)
- In office 21 August 2019 – 25 October 2021
- President: Sovereignty Council
- Preceded by: Mohamed Tahir Ayala
- Succeeded by: Himself

Personal details
- Born: 1 January 1956 (age 70) Al-Dibaibat, South Kordofan, Sudan
- Party: Independent
- Other political affiliations: Forces of Freedom and Change (until 2021)
- Spouse: Muna Abdalla
- Children: 2
- Education: University of Khartoum; University of Manchester

Abdalla Hamdok Al-Kinani (also transliterated Abdallah, Hamdouk, AlKinani; Arabic: عبد الله حمدوك الكناني, romanized: ʻAbd Allāh Ḥamdūk al-Kinānī; born 1 January 1956) is a Sudanese public administrator who served as the 15th prime minister of Sudan from 2019 to October 2021, and again from November 2021 until his resignation in 2022.

Prior to his appointment, Hamdok served in numerous national and international administrative positions. From November 2011 to October 2018, he was deputy executive secretary of the United Nations Economic Commission for Africa (UNECA). UNECA staff described Hamdok as "[a] diplomat, a humble man and a brilliant and disciplined mind". In 2020, Hamdok was named among Bloomberg's 50 Most Influential figures of the year.

Following the transfer of power from the Transitional Military Council to the Sovereignty Council of Sudan during the 2019 plan for a transition to democracy, the Sovereignty Council appointed Hamdok as prime minister. He was sworn in on 21 August 2019.

During the October 2021 Sudanese coup d'état, he was kidnapped and moved to an undisclosed location. The European Union, the United States, and other Western powers stated that they continued to recognise the Hamdok cabinet as "the constitutional leaders of the transitional government". On 21 November 2021, all political prisoners were freed and Hamdok was reinstated as prime minister as part of an agreement with the military. Hamdok resigned on 2 January 2022 amid continuing protests.

== Early life and education ==
Abdalla Hamdok was born on 1 January 1956 in Al Dibaibat, South Kordofan, Sudan. He holds a Bachelor of Science from the University of Khartoum and a doctorate in economic studies from the University of Manchester.

== Early and international career ==
From 1981 to 1987, Hamdok was a senior official in the Sudanese Ministry of Finance and Economic Planning.

In the 1990s, Hamdok held senior positions first at Deloitte & Touche and then at the International Labour Organization in Zimbabwe, followed by several years at the African Development Bank in Côte d'Ivoire. Hamdok was the Regional Director for Africa and the Middle East of the International Institute for Democracy and Electoral Assistance from 2003 to 2008.

Hamdok worked briefly for the United Nations Economic Commission for Africa (UNECA) in 2001 and 2002 as Director of Regional Integration and Trade and from 2011 to October 2018 was the Deputy Executive Secretary of UNECA. UNECA staff described Hamdok as "a true Pan-Africanist, a diplomat, a humble man and a brilliant and disciplined mind".

In September 2018, Hamdok was named as minister of finance under the Omar al-Bashir presidency of Sudan but refused the nomination.

== Prime Minister of Sudan ==
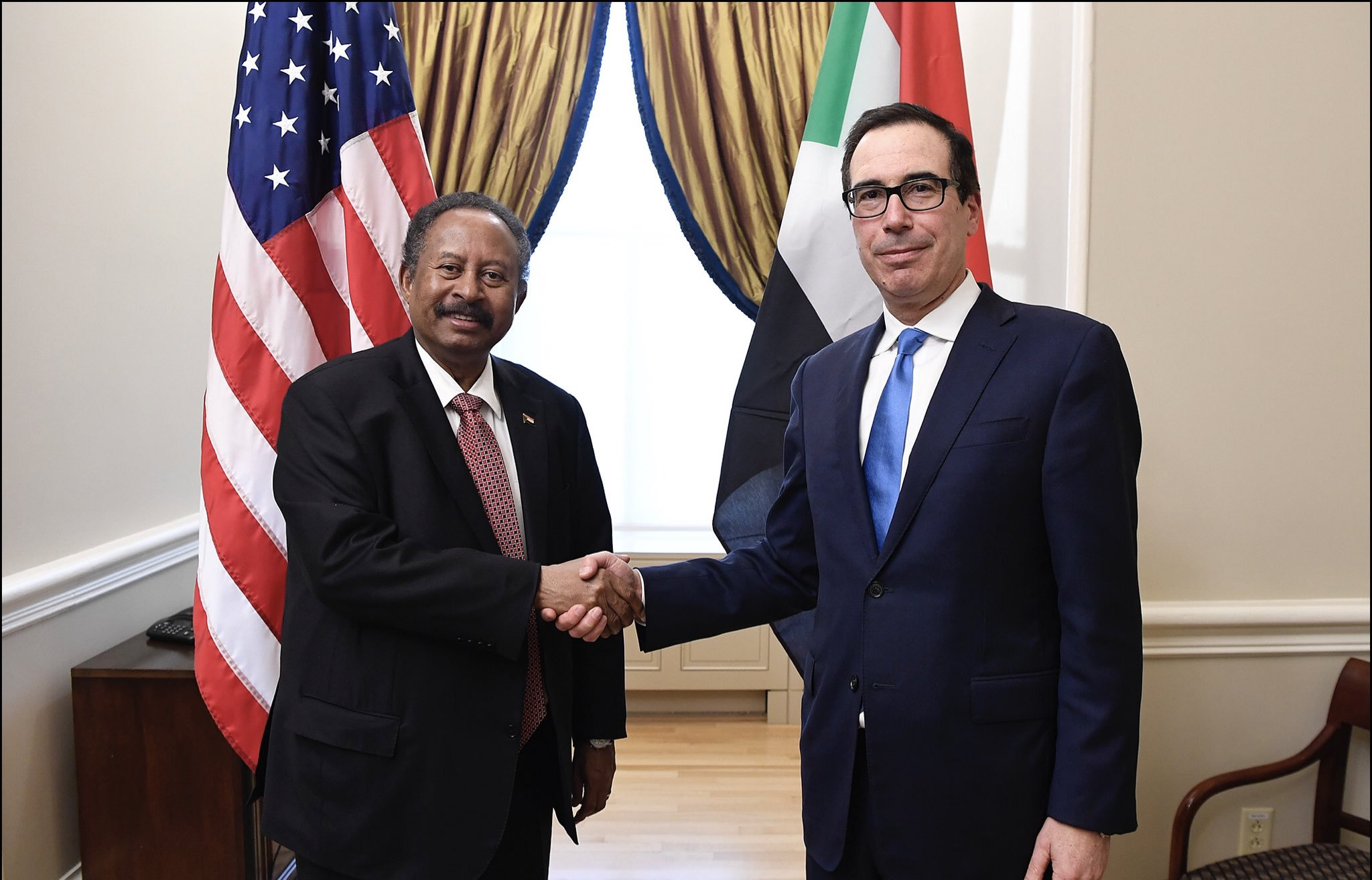
Hamdok with Steven Mnuchin at U.S. Treasury in 2019

Suggestions were made in June 2019 by a spokesperson of the Forces of Freedom and Change (FFC) and in August 2019 by The Sudan Daily that Hamdok would be proposed as Prime Minister of Sudan by the FFC, which negotiated the 2019 Sudanese transition to democracy with the Transitional Military Council (TMC). The transition procedures were formally defined in the Political Agreement signed on 17 July 2019 by the FFC and TMC and the Draft Constitutional Declaration signed by the FFC and the TMC on 4 August 2019.

The Sovereignty Council of Sudan appointed Hamdok to be prime minister on 20 August, as required by the Draft Constitutional Declaration. He was subsequently sworn in on 21 August. Under Article 19 of the Draft Constitutional Declaration, as a minister during the transitional period, Hamdok was forbidden (along with other senior transition leaders) from running in the parliamentary elections that were scheduled to end the transitional period around 2022/2023.

As prime minister, Hamdok selected a cabinet of ministers. On 4 October 2019, he purged the leadership of the public Sudanese universities, dismissing 28 chancellors and 35 vice-chancellors and appointed 34 vice-chancellors. The aim was to replace people in positions of power representing the al-Bashir government.

=== Assassination attempt ===
On 9 March 2020, a car explosion targeted Hamdok and his motorcade in an assassination attempt in the capital Khartoum. The culprit(s) has yet to be publicly identified. At least three vehicles were damaged in the attempt, but there were no casualties except for one security officer who was "lightly wounded."

=== October 2021 coup ===
On 25 October 2021, the Sudanese military, headed by Abdel Fattah al-Burhan, arrested Hamdok and other senior government figures in a coup d'état. The Ministry of Information declared that Hamdok was "still the legitimate transitional authority in the country" and called for the "immediate release of the prime minister and all detained officials". The ministry also stated that "all unilateral measures and decisions taken by the military component lack any constitutional basis, violate the law, and are considered a crime." On 26 October, Hamdok, along with his wife, returned to his home in the Kafouri neighborhood of Khartoum. Hamdok’s release followed international condemnation of the coup and calls for the military to release all the detained government officials. On 27 October, representatives of the European Union, Norway, Jordan, Libya, Somalia, Netherlands, Saudi Arabia, Israel, South Sudan, Haiti, Venezuela, Paraguay, Switzerland, the United States and the United Kingdom declared that their countries "continue to recognize the Prime Minister [Hamdok] and his cabinet as the constitutional leaders of the transitional government". On 3 November, Saudi Arabia, the United Arab Emirates, the United States and Great Britain called for the restoration of Sudan's civilian-led government. These countries also called for the end of a state of emergency, the release of political detainees, and "a genuine civil-military partnership" during the transition to elections. This was the first instance in which the UAE and Saudi Arabia have requested the restoration of a civilian-led government and return to power-sharing.

On 21 November 2021, Hamdok was reinstated as prime minister after a political agreement was signed by Sudan's top general Abdel Fattah al-Burhan to restore the transition to civilian rule. The 14-point deal called for the release of all political prisoners detained during the coup and stipulated that a 2019 constitutional declaration be the basis for a political transition. However, the Forces of Freedom and Change (FFC) civilian coalition, which shared power with the military, and the Sudanese Professionals Association (SPA) both rejected the political deal. Large crowds of protestors also took to the streets to reject any deal involving the military. According to a spokesperson, this agreement was not voluntary on Hamdok's behalf, as "the pact had been struck with a gun to his head." At first it remained unclear how much power Hamdok and his cabinet would have after being reinstated as prime minister. However, by mid-December 2021, Hamdok was confident enough to dismiss the acting governors who had been appointed by General al- Burhan. He also replaced several government ministers appointed by the military, including some with close links to the previous regime of Omar al-Bashir.

=== Resignation as prime minister ===
On 2 January 2022, Hamdok announced his resignation as prime minister in a televised speech, saying that the country was at a dangerous turning point and roundtable discussion was needed to come to a new agreement for Sudan's political transition to democracy. According to sources contacted by CNN, Hamdok's resignation was triggered by the military reneging on a "non-interference" agreement.

=== 2023 Sudan war ===
In the 2023 Sudanese war, Hamdok led the Tagadum in peace negotiations. Tagadum announced its dissolution on 10 February 2025, with Hamdok forming a new body, known as the Civil Democratic Alliance of the Forces of the Revolution (Sumoud), the following day.

On 23 October 2025, the Central Bank of Sudan froze Hamdok's assets after he was accused of supporting the RSF. On 19 January 2026 a trial was started against Hamdok in the anti-terrorism court in Port Sudan.

== Views ==
=== Agriculture ===
Hamdok has pushed for a change from subsistence agriculture to "more dynamic, commercial oriented" agriculture in Africa, stating in 2014 that despite the fact 300 million Africans suffer from hunger, Africa should be capable of food self-sufficiency. Referring to the IPCC Fifth Assessment Report (AR5) estimate of the effects of a 2-degree Celsius global average warming above pre-industrial levels, Hamdok noted that effects such as reduced rainfall could prevent Africa from reducing extreme poverty. To combat hunger, Hamdok proposed infrastructure improvements (such as methods of transforming, storing and transporting excess produce to markets); the use of "climate information"; improved water management; and greater integration of agriculture with national industry and science and technology research institutions. During his term, he also dealt with the continent's 2019–2021 locust infestation.

=== Women's rights ===
As prime minister, Hamdok had the role in late August 2019 of selecting ministers from a list of candidates proposed to him by the Forces of Freedom and Change (FFC), apart from the ministers of interior and defence, to be chosen by military members of the Sovereignty Council. Hamdok delayed his decision on which candidates to select, stating that one of his reasons for objecting was that too few women were present on the list. He stated that he would "take into account a fair representation of women". Four women became ministers in the Hamdok Cabinet: Asma Mohamed Abdalla as foreign minister, Lina al-Sheikh as minister of social development and labour, Wala'a Essam al-Boushi as minister for youth and sports and Intisar el-Zein Soughayroun as minister of higher education.

In November 2019, the government of Sudan repealed all laws restricting women's freedom of dress, movement, association, work and study. Hamdok praised women in a message published on social media, saying that the laws were "an instrument of exploitation, humiliation, violation, aggression on the rights of citizens." In 2020, Hamdok passed a law to prohibit female genital mutilation.

== Personal life ==
Hamdok married fellow economist Muna Abdalla in 1993 in south Manchester. They have two adult sons; one studying at Exeter University as of 2019 and one who graduated from a university in the United States in the late 2010s.

== See also ==
- Muhammad Sa'id al-Qaddal
- Jimmy Lemi Milla
- Omar al-Bashir
