= Robert Broadwood =

British Army general

Lieutenant-General Robert Broadwood CB
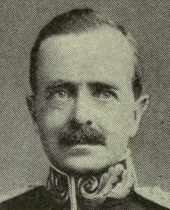
- Born: 14 March 1862; Chelsea, London
- Died: 21 June 1917 (aged 55); France
- Military career
- Allegiance: United Kingdom
- Branch: British Army
- Service years: 1881–1917
- Rank: Lieutenant-General
- Commands: Commander of British Troops in South China
- Conflicts: Mahdist War; Second Boer War; World War I
- Awards: Companion of the Order of the Bath

Lieutenant-General Robert George Broadwood (14 March 1862 – 21 June 1917) was a British Army general. A cavalry officer, Broadwood saw service in the Sudan, in the Second Boer War, and in the First World War. He was killed in action in 1917, while commanding the 57th Division, having earlier been accused of lacking "fighting spirit" for his refusal to sacrifice his troops in attacks he considered to be hopeless.

== Early life ==
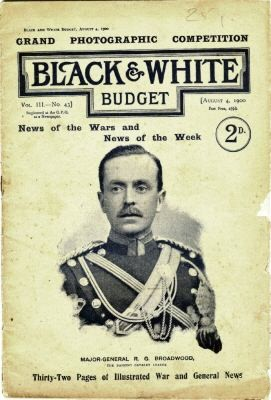
Broadwood pictured as a major-general in the Black & White Budget

Robert was the third son and child of Thomas Broadwood, of Holmbush Park, Surrey, and Mary Athlea Matthews. He was a grandson of John Broadwood, the founder of John Broadwood & Sons, the piano company.

He was educated at Charterhouse School and the Royal Military College, Sandhurst.

== Early military career ==
After Sandhurst, Broadwood was commissioned into the 12th Royal Lancers (Prince of Wales), which was then in India, on 22 January 1881. He became a first lieutenant on 1 July 1881 and a captain on 15 February 1888.

He passed out from the Staff College at Camberley in December 1890. In May 1892, he was appointed aide-de-camp to Major-General Godfrey Clerk, general officer commanding, Belfast District. Later the same year, he was selected for service with the Egyptian Army.

== Sudan, 1896–1898 ==
In 1896, Broadwood served in the Dongola Expeditionary Force under Sir Herbert Kitchener and took part in the Battle of Firket and the operations at Hafir. Appointed to the command of the Egyptian cavalry, in 1897 Broadwood, promoted to major on augmentation on 3 April, participated in the Battle of Abu Hamed and the occupation of Berber. In 1898, he fought at the Battle of Atbara and at the Battle of Omdurman. One of Broadwood's staff officers during his time as commander of the Egyptian cavalry was Douglas Haig, who commanded the British Expeditionary Force during the First World War.

For his services in the Sudan, Broadwood was made a brevet lieutenant-colonel in 1897 and a brevet colonel. He received the Queen's Sudan Medal and the Khedive's Sudan Medal with five clasps, was appointed to the fourth class of the Order of Osmanieh, and was mentioned in despatches several times.

== Second Boer War ==
Broadwood saw active service again during the Second Boer War, commanding the 2nd Cavalry Brigade (with local rank of brigadier-general). He took part in the relief of Kimberley and the Battle of Paardeberg in February 1900. In March 1900, Broadwood's force was ambushed at Sanna's Post by the Boers, suffering 571 casualties and losing several guns, though he eventually managed to extricate his troops. Major-General Sir Henry Colvile was ordered to assist him, but was slow in doing so. This incident was one of the two reasons cited for Colvile's removal from command the following year. In the aftermath of the ambush, the Cabinet urged Lord Roberts to supersede Broadwood, which he refused to do.

In December 1900, however, Broadwood was held responsible Lord Roberts for Major-General R. A. P. Clements' defeat at Nooitgedacht and was sent home to England. He returned to the field the following year. In June 1901, Broadwood captured most of President Martinus Theunis Steyn's staff and some of the guns he had lost at Sanna's Post, but Steyn managed to escape.

For his services, Broadwood was mentioned in despatches twice, including by Lord Roberts, who described him as "commanding the 2nd Cavalry Brigade with exceptional ability and dash throughout the operations". He was appointed a Companion of the Order of the Bath (CB) on 29 November 1900, but was not invested by King Edward VII at Buckingham Palace until 8 August 1902. He was appointed an extra aide-de-camp to the King in 1901.

== South Africa and China ==
In December 1902, Broadwood was appointed Colonel on the Staff to command the Troops in Natal, with the substantive rank of colonel, and the local rank of brigadier-general. In 1904, he was appointed Officer Commanding, Orange River Colony District, serving until 1906, when he was appointed General Officer Commanding, South China, and promoted to major-general. He was reportedly popular in Hong Kong due to his interest in racing, serving as a steward of the Jockey Club. He served as GOC until 1910. While serving in this position, Broadwood was made colonel of his regiment, the 12th Lancers, in March 1909.

He was promoted to lieutenant-general, dated 7 March 1912, and retired from the army on 3 December 1913.

== First World War ==
Broadwood returned to active service after the outbreak of the First World War, first as the commanding officer of the 1st Mounted Division from 29 September 1914. In July 1916, he was still in command when the division was reorganized as the 1st Cyclist Division. He took command of the 57th (2nd West Lancashire) Division, in October 1916. His division went to France in 1917, as part of II ANZAC Corps.

According to Colonel C. J. L. Allanson, the 57th Division's GSO1, Broadwood had been reported by his corps commander, Sir Alexander Godley, for "lack of fighting spirit" for refusing to launch attacks he considered hopeless and which he thought would needlessly sacrifice the lives of his best officers. When his division was transferred to XI Corps, the new corps commander, Sir Richard Haking, made similar remarks. Broadwood was much affected by the comments, and according to Allanson "now seemed determined to get killed".

=== Death ===
On 21 June 1917, Broadwood had planned to visit his artillery group, despite a warning from the group commander that the railway bridge over the River Lys, the only way to get there, was under German observation. Broadwood nevertheless crossed the bridge, but left behind his staff. The German artillery fired on the bridge, severely wounding Broadwood, who lost both of his legs. Before he died, he was reported to have said that "he was glad to go after being told that he had no fighting spirit, and that his wish was to be buried between a soldier and a subaltern."

Broadwood, the seventh of nine British divisional commanders to be killed or die of wounds during the war, (Note: The other fatalities were: Hubert Hamilton, GOC 3rd Division, Samuel Lomax, GOC 1st Division, Thompson Capper, GOC 7th Division, George Thesiger, GOC 9th (Scottish) Division, Frederick Wing, GOC 12th (Eastern) Division, Edward Ingouville-Williams, GOC 34th Division, Edward Feetham, GOC 39th Division, and Louis Lipsett, GOC 4th Division.) is buried in the Anzac Cemetery near Sailly-sur-la-Lys, between an Australian soldier and a British subaltern.

Broadwood Wood in Hong Kong is named after him.

== Equestrianism ==
Broadwood was a keen horseman who rode in the Grand National. He was the first president of the South African Polo Association in 1905.

== See also ==
- List of generals of the British Empire who died during the First World War

== Bibliography ==
- Becke, Major A. F. (1936). Order of Battle of Divisions Part 2A. The Territorial Force Mounted Divisions and the 1st-Line Territorial Force Divisions (42–56). London: His Majesty's Stationery Office. OCLC 493146712.

Military offices
Preceded by Villiers Hatton	Commander of British Troops in South China; 1906–1910	Succeeded by Sir Charles Anderson
Preceded by John Forster	GOC 57th (2nd West Lancashire) Division; 1916–1917	Succeeded by Reginald Barnes
Honorary titles
Preceded by John Cecil Russell	Colonel of the 12th (Prince of Wales's Royal) Lancers; 1909–1917	Succeeded by Walter Howorth Greenly
