= Battle of Hafir =

Last major engagement in The Anglo-Egyptian expedition of Sudan

- Part of Anglo-Egyptian conquest of Sudan
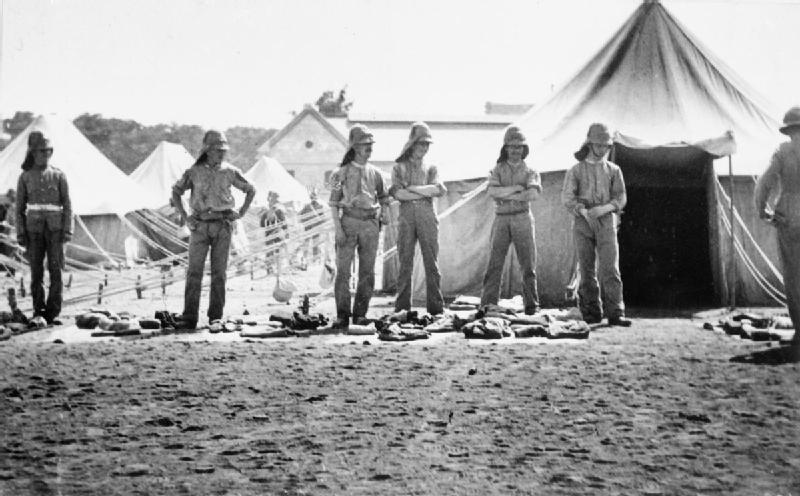
- Kitchener's army during the Nile Expedition
Date	17–19 September 1896
Location	Hafir, Nile Valley, Sudan
Result	Anglo-Egyptian victory

Belligerents
United Kingdom (Khedivate of Egypt) Egypt	Mahdist State

Commanders and leaders
(United Kingdom) Herbert Kitchener (Royal Navy) Stanley Colville; H.A Parisons	Emir Wad Bashara

Units involved
5 gunboats 2 steamers 1 European regiment 2 Egyptian battalions	1 steamer Several boats Mahdist warriors

Strength
1,200–1,400 infantry 100–270 cavalry 20–24 guns	200–500 cavalry 3,000–4,000 infantry

Casualties and losses
16 killed and wounded	250–400 killed and wounded 20–30 captured 1 steamer and at least 3 boats sunk

The Battle of Hafir was fought on 17–19 September 1896 during the Dongola Expedition, part of the Anglo-Egyptian conquest of Sudan. Anglo-Egyptian forces under Sir Herbert Kitchener forced the Mahdist positions at Hafir to flee, enabling the Anglo-Egyptian advance to Dongola.

== Background ==
After the victory at Firket With General Herbert Kitchener’s Anglo-Egyptian army advancing up the Nile to reconquer the Sudan, the fortified position at Hafir, near Kerma, was the last major obstacle on the river. Hafir sat on the Nile rapids near Kerma. The Mahdists entrenched batteries and rifle pits there to deny passage to Anglo‑Egyptian gunboats. Without clearing Hafir, Kitchener's flotilla could not advance. The British for better transport, communication and to prevent the Mahdists from reinforcing Dongola had to capture Harif. Mahdist commander Emir Wad Bashara attempted to block the rapids of Hafir, just north of Dongola. The British forces nearly had 8,000 men, though at Hafir only 3 battalions were present. The 1st battalion of North Staffordshire Regiment, and two from the Anglo-Egyptian army, few detachments of cavalry, 20–25 artillery pieces under Lt. Colonel Parisons, 2 steamers and 5 gunboats with about 320 sailors under Commander Stanley Colville. The over all command was under Sirdar Kitchener. The Mahdist force had several out classed boats and a steamer, about 500 cavalry including camels and 3,000–4,000 irregulars.

== The Battle ==
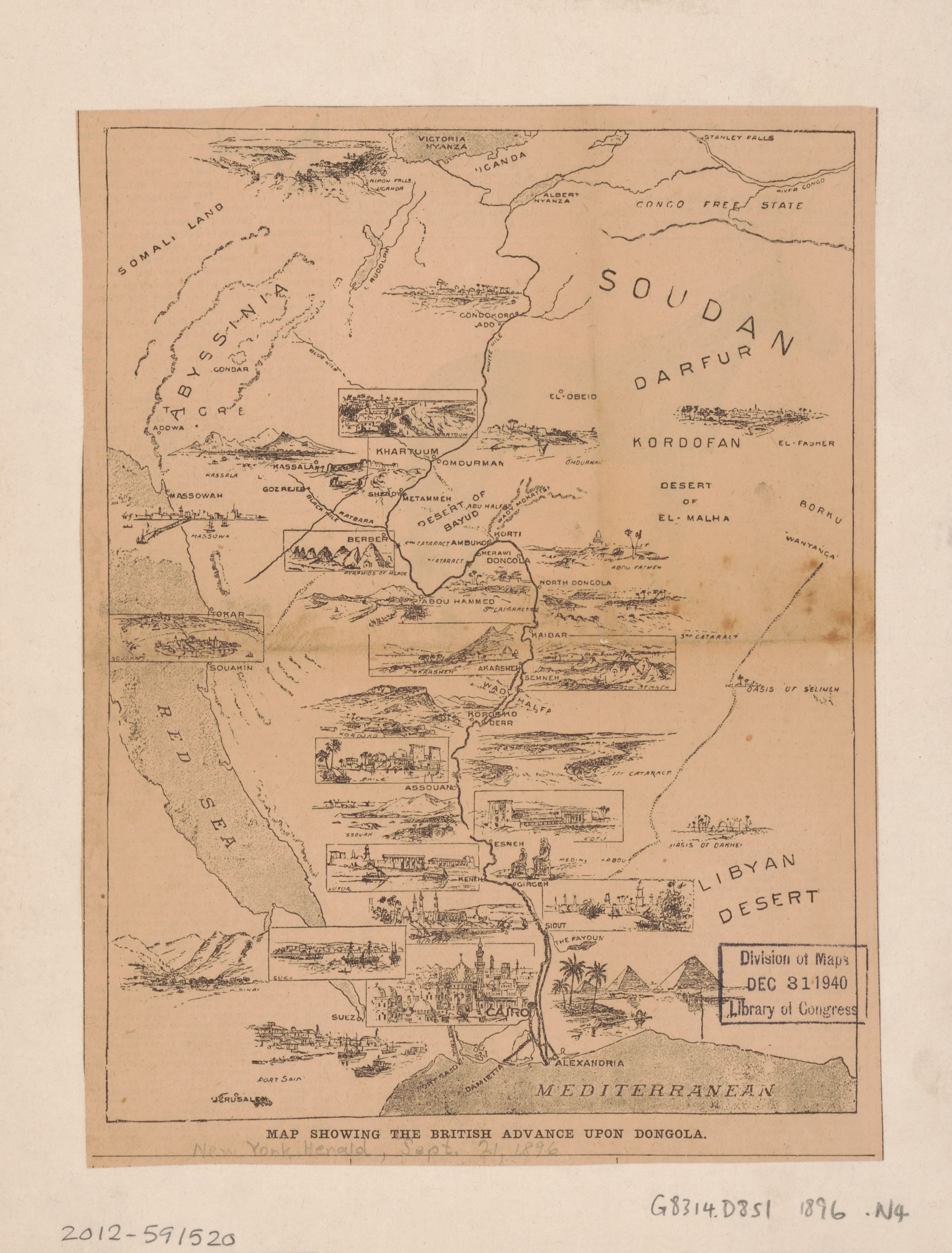
British advance upon Dongola

On the morning of the 19th Kerma was immediately occupied without opposition from the Mahdists. But the Mahdist force had garrisoned Hafir a day before it. From the elevated ground at Kerma a large number of Mahdist troops were spotted on the western banks of the Nile, along with a number of boats and a steamer. Kitchener organised his artillery and ordered the artillery to pound on the enemy. Colville's gunboats, which had been instructed to proceed to Dongola, attempted to pass Hafir, but were received by a very heavy fire from guns placed in screened batteries and from riflemen entrenched in deep pits at the river's edge. The Royal Artillery under Lieutenant-Colonel Parsons advanced to a position on the low-lying ground opposite the Dervish forts and after a preliminary bombardment the gunboats were able to pass successfully under hot open fire by the Mahdists. The British gunboats by now had passed and advanced towards the Mahdist steamer and sunk it. In the first approach of the steamers to the enemy's position Colville, was wounded in the wrist. The artillery continued to bombard the forts until night on the fortified positions, Bashara believing that the Anglo-Egyptian main force was marching south to cross the river with the help of three advanced gunboats, evacuated Hafir and fell back on Dongola.

== Aftermath ==
Early on the morning of 20th September the Anglo-Egyptian force occupied Hafir with a brigade suffering only 16 men killed or wounded and capturing about 20–30 Mahdist prisoners. With the position secure preparations were made to cross the river. The entire force of 13,000 men and 3,200 animals with the assistance of the Royal Navy ferried across the Nile. The crossing was conducted rapidly and completed within thirty hours, a notable logistical achievement. The evacuation of Emir Bashara removed the last major obstacle of the Nile Expedition. Within a day Kitchener reached to Dongola on the 23rd without opposition. HIs occupation of Dongola marked the successful conclusion of the 1896 campaign, and secured the northern Sudan for Anglo‑Egyptian control.
