= Battle of Gedaref =

1898 battle in Sudan

- Part of Anglo-Egyptian conquest of Sudan
Date	22 October 1898
Location	Gedaref (El-Gadarif), eastern Sudan
Result	Anglo-Egyptian victory

Belligerents
United Kingdom (Khedivate of Egypt) Egypt	Mahdist State

Commanders and leaders
Major-General H. M. L. Rundle; Colonel Parsons	Emir Ahmed Fedil

Units involved
Grenadier Guards; Royal Berkshire Regiment; Native Battalions	Khalifa loyalists

Strength
1,500 infantry 350 cavalry 10 guns	6,000–7,000 Mahdist warriors

Casualties and losses
Light (exact figures uncertain)	Heavy (hundreds killed or wounded)
- Relief of Parsons’ besieged force; secured eastern Sudan flank after Omdurman

The Battle of Gedaref was fought on 22 October 1898 to relieve the besieged British garrison at Gedaref.

== Background ==
After the disastrous defeat of the Khalifa's main army at Omdurman, it had regrouped in eastern Sudan. Gedaref was a frontier town controlling trade routes and grain supplies. Holding it was vital for the Anglo‑Egyptian Army to secure the eastern flank and prevent Mahdist resurgence.

== The siege ==
The siege lasted from early September to 22 October until Rundle's relief column arrived. The British had made makeshift fortifications around Gedaref, with artillery covering approaches. The besieged garrison had XVI Sudanese battalion which numbered 700 Sudanese troops commanded by British officers and NCOs, with about 150 camel troops and 4 field guns under the command of Colonel Parsons of the Royal Artillery, who had served under Kitchener in Hafir. About 7,000 Mahdi warriors had surrounded the city and attacked it multiple times but failed. In mid October when the ammunition and supplies were running low the Mahdist horsemen attempted to break into Gedaref by striking at weak points and harassing the defenders. Parsons’ small cavalry countercharged, preventing a breakthrough.

== The battle ==
On 22 October, Rundle's relief column had arrived. His column consisted of 1,100 men, including detachments of the Grenadier Guards and Royal Berkshire Regiment, the XV Sudanese Battalion, 250-300 camel mounted cavalry and 6 field guns. He broke through the besiegers outside the city by shelling on the Mahdists with counter volleys. Rundle's men linked up with Lt. Col Parsons’ garrison. The defenders had been holding out under constant pressure and were nearly exhausted. Upon having innumerous casualties the Emir retreated.

=== Aftermath ===
The defeat at Gedaref effectively ended Mahdist resistance in eastern Sudan. With the Khalifa's main army destroyed at Omdurman earlier that year, the collapse of Fedil's force removed the last significant threat to Anglo-Egyptian consolidation. Gedaref's security allowed the reconquest to be completed and the Anglo-Egyptian Condominium to be formally established in 1899, inaugurating joint British-Egyptian rule over Sudan.
