= Murray Irwin =

British Army doctor (1858–1938)

Major-General Sir James Murray Irwin KCMG CB
- James Murray Irwin in Arosa, Switzerland in 1909
- Born: February 13, 1858; Manorcunningham, County Donegal, Ireland
- Died: November 7, 1938 (aged 80); Bideford, Devon, England
- Military career
- Allegiance: United Kingdom
- Branch: British Army
- Service years: 1881–1919
- Rank: Major-General
- Unit: Royal Army Medical Corps
- Awards: KCMG, CB, Officer, Legion of Honour

Major-General Sir James Murray Irwin KCMG CB (13 February 1858 – 7 November 1938) was an Irish-born British Army medical officer who served in the Royal Army Medical Corps (RAMC) for nearly four decades.

After entering the Army Medical Department in 1881, Irwin served in India, Gibraltar, the Sudan Campaign, Crete, the Second Boer War, and China. During the First World War, he held senior medical administrative posts, serving as Assistant Director-General at the War Office and later as Director of Medical Services (DMS) for the British Third Army in France.

== Early life and education ==
Irwin was born on 13 February 1858 at the Raymoghy manse in Manorcunningham, County Donegal, Ireland, the son of the Reverend James William Irwin and Florine Griffiths. He was educated at Trinity College Dublin, graduating in 1881 with degrees in medicine and surgery: Bachelor of Medicine (MB), Bachelor of Surgery (BCh), and Master of Obstetric Art (MAO). Decades later, in 1919, his alma mater awarded him an honorary Doctor of Medicine (MD). During his university years, he was an active athlete, competing in rowing and rugby union for Trinity College.He also joined the British Medical Association early in his career, in 1882.

In 1884, while stationed in India, Irwin married Nora Conlan, daughter of Thomas Conlan, a Queen's Counsel (Q.C.). The couple had one daughter, Edna Florine, born in 1885.

== Military career ==
=== Early career and overseas postings (1881–1911) ===
Irwin entered the Army Medical School at Netley in 1881 and was commissioned as a Surgeon Captain in the Army Medical Department on 4 February 1882.

Between 1883 and 1889, Irwin served in Allahabad, India, where he was involved in epidemic management for cholera and malaria and served as Station Staff Medical Officer. In 1891, he was posted to Gibraltar, commanding medical services for Artillery North. While stationed there, he witnessed the disaster following the sinking of the passenger ship SS Utopia, which collided with HMS Anson in Gibraltar Bay.

Promoted to Surgeon Major, Irwin was attached to the British contingent during the 1898 Anglo-Egyptian reconquest of the Sudan led by Lord Kitchener. Stationed at Atbara, personal records from his manuscript memoirs describe his work overseeing sanitation, field hospital screening, and water filtration procedures prior to the advance on Omdurman. For his service in the campaign, he was awarded the Queen's Sudan Medal and the Khedive's Sudan Medal. Following the 1898 Candia massacre in Crete, Irwin served with the international peacekeeping force overseeing hospital security and troop evacuations.

During the Second Boer War (1900–1902), Irwin participated in British military operations in the Orange Free State and the Transvaal, including actions at Zand River, Johannesburg, Pretoria, Diamond Hill, and Belfast. He was Mentioned in despatches and received both the Queen's South Africa Medal (with six clasps) and the King's South Africa Medal (with two clasps).

=== Senior administrative roles and First World War (1906–1919) ===
From 1 June 1906 to 1910, Lieutenant-Colonel Irwin served at the War Office in London as Assistant Director-General of the Army Medical Service, working alongside Director-General Sir Alfred Keogh during the post-Boer War reforms of the RAMC. In June 1910, he was posted to Tientsin as senior medical officer to the British garrison in North China. He was promoted Colonel on 11 December 1911.

At the outbreak of the First World War in 1914, Irwin oversaw the organization and medical preparations at the newly opened King George V Hospital in Waterloo, London, prior to deployment to France. In France, he served initially as Deputy Director of Medical Services and was subsequently promoted to Temporary Surgeon-General in April 1916, serving as Director of Medical Services (DMS) for the British Third Army. His administration of Third Army medical services coincided with early developments in military blood transfusion protocols.

During the war, Irwin was mentioned in despatches four times. He was appointed a Companion of the Order of the Bath (CB) in the 1917 New Year Honours and knighted as a Knight Commander of the Order of St Michael and St George (KCMG) in the 1918 New Year Honours. In 1920, the French Republic conferred upon him the Officer of the Legion of Honour.

== Later life and death ==
Irwin retired from the British Army in 1919 and settled in North Devon at Bideford. In retirement, he engaged in local civic affairs, serving on the Bideford and District Hospital Committee and as an elected member of the Northam Urban District Council.

He died at his home in Bideford on 7 November 1938 at the age of 80.

== Honours and decorations ==
| Ribbon | Honour / Medal | Year |
|---|---|---|
| UK Order St-Michael St-George ribbon | Knight Commander of the Order of St Michael and St George (KCMG) | 1918 |
| Ribbon of the Order of the Bath | Companion of the Order of the Bath (CB) | 1917 |
| Ribbon of the Officer of the Legion of Honour | Officer of the Legion of Honour (France) | 1920 |
| Ribbon of the Queen's Sudan Medal | Queen's Sudan Medal | 1898 |
| Ribbon of the Khedive's Sudan Medal | Khedive's Sudan Medal (1897) | 1898 |
| Ribbon of the Queen's South Africa Medal | Queen's South Africa Medal (6 clasps) | 1901 |
| Ribbon of the King's South Africa Medal | King's South Africa Medal (2 clasps) | 1902 |
| Ribbon of the 1914–15 Star | 1914–15 Star | 1919 |
| Ribbon of the British War Medal | British War Medal | 1919 |
| Ribbon of the Victory Medal | Victory Medal (with Oak Leaf for MiD) | 1919 |
