= Khedive's Sudan Medal =

Khedive's Sudan Medal may refer to:

- Khedive's Sudan Medal (1897), campaign medal awarded by the Khedivate of Egypt to both Egyptian and British forces for service during the reconquest of the Sudan, the final part of the Mahdist War.
- Khedive's Sudan Medal (1910), campaign medal awarded by the Khedivate of Egypt for service in the Anglo-Egyptian Sudan.

== See also ==
- Khedive
