= Khedive's Star =

Military award

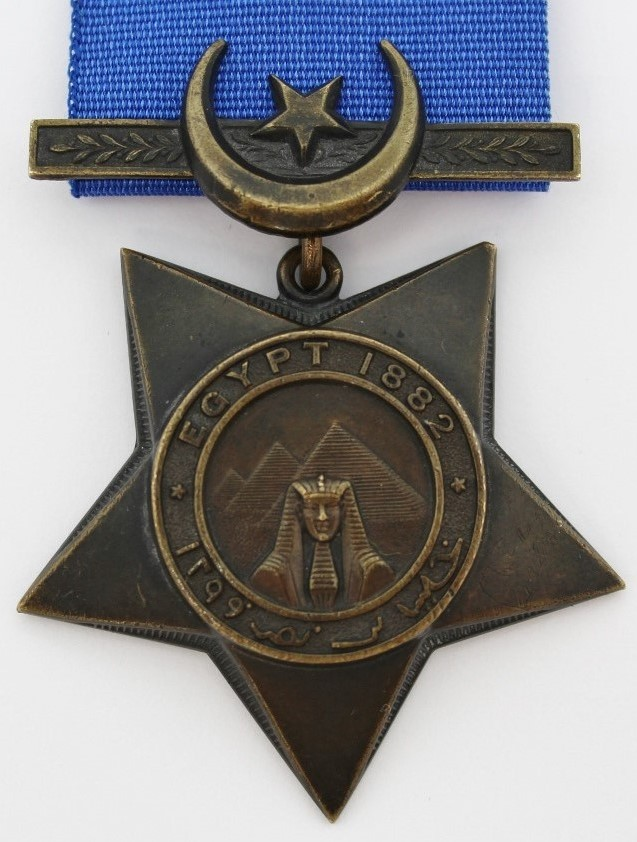
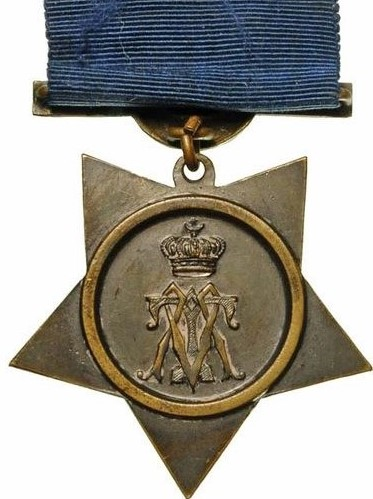
- Khedive's Star: obverse and reverse
- Type: Campaign medal
- Presented by: the Khedivate of Egypt
- Eligibility: Egyptian, British and Indian forces.
- Campaigns: Anglo-Egyptian War; Mahdist War
- Established: 1882
- Final award: 1891
- Ribbon bar of the medal
- Related: Egypt Medal; Khedive's Sudan Medal (1897); Khedive's Sudan Medal (1910)

The Khedive's Star was a campaign medal established by Khedive Tewfik Pasha to reward those who had participated in the military campaigns in Egypt and the Sudan between 1882 and 1891. This included British forces who served during the 1882 Anglo-Egyptian War and the subsequent Mahdist War, who received both the British Egypt Medal and the Khedive's Star. Cast in bronze and lacquered, it is also known as the Khedive's Bronze Star.

== History ==
After the outbreak of the Anglo-Egyptian War in 1882, the United Kingdom met with opposition from Ahmed ‘Urabi a nationalist and supporter of Egyptian independence. The British success in the war strengthened the position of the Khedive of Egypt, Tewfik Pasha, a supporter of the British government, who decided to reward all British and Indian Army soldiers who took part in the campaign and who had received the British Egypt Medal. Permission was granted to wear the star in uniform.

The award of the Star was extended to the subsequent Mahdist War in the Sudan until 1891. When the reconquest of the Sudan recommenced in 1896, the Khedive authorised a new campaign medal.

The Khedive also made a small number of awards of the Star to Egyptian civilians for non-military service.

== Description ==
The medal consists of a five-pointed bronze star darkened by means of lacquer. On the obverse, the centre of the star shows an image of the sphinx with the pyramids in the background, all within a ring bearing the word "EGYPT" and the appropriate date, above the corresponding Arabic inscription. The reverse has the monogram of Tawfiq Pasha, crowned. The suspension bar for the dark blue ribbon bears a crescent and a star. Issued unnamed, some recipients arranged privately for their details to be engraved on the reverse.

The medal was manufactured by Henry Jenkins and Sons of Birmingham, who also made the Kabul to Kandahar Star of 1880.

=== Different versions ===
There are four variations of the star that correspond to the different campaigns with only one star, the earliest qualified for, awarded to each recipient:

- Dated 1882: for service in support of the Khedive in the 1882 Anglo-Egyptian War.

For service in the Sudan during the Mahdist War:

- Dated 1884: operations between 19 February and 26 March 1884, relating to the first Suakin Expedition.
- Dated 1884-6: operations from 26 March 1884 to 7 October 1886, including the Nile expedition to relieve General Gordon besieged at Khartoum and for the 1885 operations near Suakin.
- Undated: operations from 1887 to 1891, mainly near Suakin and along the Nile.

In addition, a clasp inscribed Tokar in Arabic only (توكار) was awarded to those present at the action at Tokar on 19 February 1891. This was fitted to the Star already held or, for new recipients, awarded with an undated Star.

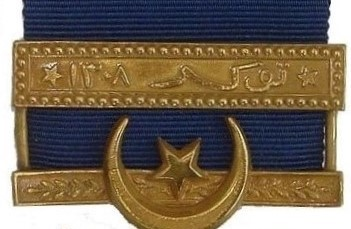
The Tokar clasp

For British forces, the Star is always accompanied by the Egypt Medal, with the exception of service at Tokar in 1891, where the Egypt Medal was not awarded.
