= Khedive's Sudan Medal (1910) =

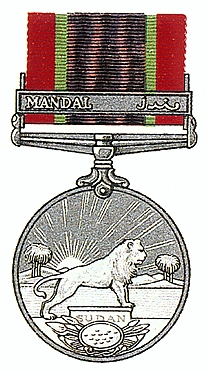
- Reverse, depicted on a cigarette card
- Type: Campaign medal
- Description: Awarded in silver and bronze
- Presented by: the Khedivate of Egypt
- Eligibility: Egyptian Army and seconded British officers
- Campaign: Mahdist War
- Clasps: 16 in total
- Established: 1911
- Final award: 1926
- Ribbon of the medal
- Related: Khedive's Star; Queen's Sudan Medal; Khedive's Sudan Medal (1897); Sudan General Service Medal (1933)

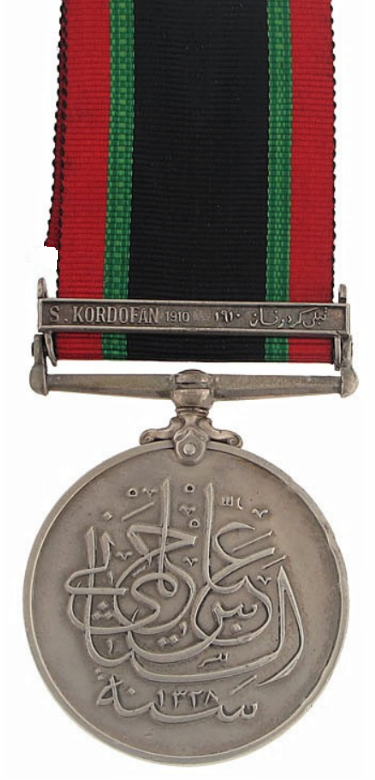
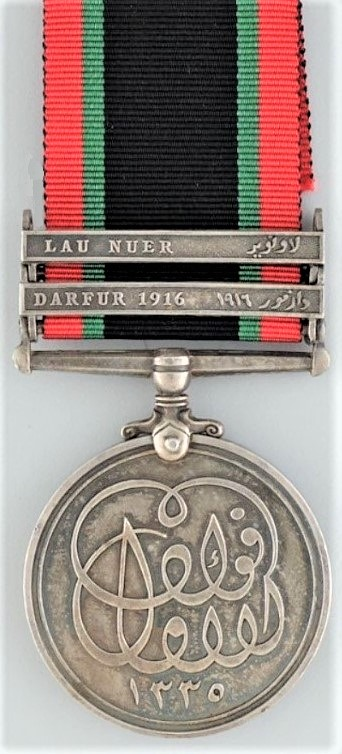
Khedive's Sudan Medal, obverse.
Left: first type, bearing name of Abbas II.
Right: from 1917, with name of Fouad I.

The Khedive's Sudan Medal was a campaign medal awarded by the Khedivate of Egypt for service in the Anglo-Egyptian Sudan. Established in 1911 by the Khedive, this medal replaced the earlier Khedive's Sudan Medal (1897) and was superseded by the Sudan Defence Force General Service Medal (1933).

== Award criteria ==
The medal was awarded for minor operations in the Sudan to members of the Egyptian Army, including Sudanese battalions. Recipients included a number of British Army officers seconded to the Egyptian Army. It was issued in silver with clasps to combatants and without a clasp to non-combatants. Camp followers, such as porters and grooms, received the medal in bronze without a clasp.

While no complete British Army unit took part in any qualifying campaign, a 48 strong British Army Maxim Gun detachment drawn from a number of different regiments received the Durfur 1916 clasp, while the medal without clasp was awarded to a camel corps company manned by the Royal Warwickshire Regiment, in reserve during this campaign. A number of members of the Royal Flying Corps received the medal with the Durfur 1916 and Fasher clasps, while about thirty members of the Royal Air Force received the Garjak Nuer clasp.

== Appearance ==
The medal is circular, 39 millimetres in diameter, and made of silver or bronze. The obverse bears the Arabic cypher of the Khedive, and the Hijri year of its establishment. The medal awarded in 1911 bears the cypher of Khedive Abba Hilmi, while that from 1918 shows the cypher of the Sultan Hussain Kamil. The reverse depicts a lion standing on a plinth bearing the word SUDAN with, behind, the sun rising above the flowing River Nile.
The medal hangs from a straight bar suspension, the 32 millimetre wide watered ribbon being black with thin red and green stripes on each side.
The medal was issued unnamed, except for a few to British recipients that were named in small impressed capitals.

== Clasps ==
The medal was awarded with sixteen clasps inscribed in both English and Arabic, the largest number issued with one medal being five. Bronze medals were awarded without a clasp.

- Atwot
- Southern Kerdofan 1910
- Sudan 1912
- Mandal
- Miri
- Zeraf 1913-1914
- Mongalla 1915-1916
- Durfur 1916
- Fasher
- Lau-Nuer
- Nyima 1917-1918
- Atwot 1918
- Aliab Dinka
- Garjak Nuer
- Nyala
- Darpur 1921
