= Affad Basin =

Region in northern Sudan

The Affad Basin is a region located in the Middle Nile Valley. Affad 23 is an archaeological site located in the Affad region of southern Dongola Reach in northern Sudan, which hosts "the well-preserved remains of prehistoric camps (relics of the oldest open-air hut in the world) and diverse hunting and gathering loci some 50,000 years old". Osypińska (2021) indicates that an "archaeozoological discovery made at Affad turned out to be of great importance for the entire history of cattle on the African continent. A large skull fragment and a nearly complete horn core of an auroch, a wild ancestor of domestic cattle, were discovered at sites dating back 50,000 years and associated with the MSA. These are the oldest remains of the auroch in Sudan, and they also mark the southernmost range of this species in the world." Based on the cattle (Bos) remains found at Affad and Letti, Osypiński (2022) indicates that it is "justified to raise again the issue of the origin of cattle in Northeast Africa. The idea of domestic cattle in Africa coming from the Fertile Crescent exclusively is now seen as having serious shortcomings."

== Archaeology ==
Initially, the sites of Affad were surveyed between 1998 and 2003. In 2012, archaeologists from the Institute of Archaeology and Ethnology, Polish Academy of Sciences began excavation of the sites. The excavation data spans approximately 70,000 years of this region's history in Sudan.

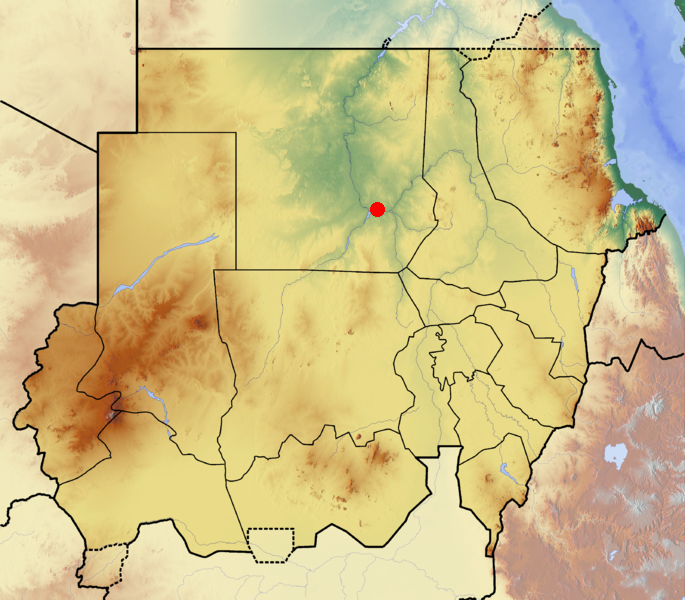
Location of Affad 23 in Sudan

Affad 23 is an archaeological site located in alluvial deposits formed by an ancient channel of the Nile in the Affad region of southern Dongola Reach in northern Sudan. Affad 23 hosts "the well-preserved remains of prehistoric camps (relics of the oldest open-air hut in the world) and diverse hunting and gathering loci some 50,000 years old". Osypińska (2021) states:

The complex of Middle Paleolithic sites around Affad in the Southern Dongola Reach is important from the point of view of the oldest stages of the history of the Middle Nile region. At sites encompassing the remains of hunter-gatherer encampments from about 50,000 years ago, more than 10,000 petrified animal remains have been discovered. The main group of animals hunted by the late Pleistocene communities in Affad were even-toed ungulates. The hunting patterns of Middle Paleolithic communities varied according to the season. In winter, the dry season, the zone of coastal forest and scrub was exploited. The main species hunted was the shy, medium-sized kob antelope (Kobus sp.). It is most likely that large catfish (Siluriformes) were also caught at low water levels in winter. In summer, when the waters of the Nile flooded the lower-lying areas, people hunted animals living in the more open area of the wooded park savanna. The main species killed then was the auroch (Bos primigenius). An archaeozoological discovery made at Affad turned out to be of great importance for the entire history of cattle on the African continent. A large skull fragment and a nearly complete horn core of an auroch, a wild ancestor of domestic cattle, were discovered at sites dating back 50,000 years and associated with the MSA. These are the oldest remains of the auroch in Sudan, and they also mark the southernmost range of this species in the world.

In addition to the harvesting and utilization of cereals (e.g., millet), an abundant amount of pottery was produced at Affad 69. Based on the cattle (Bos) remains found at Affad and Letti, Osypiński (2022) indicates that it is "justified to raise again the issue of the origin of cattle in Northeast Africa. The idea of domestic cattle in Africa coming from the Fertile Crescent exclusively is now seen as having serious shortcomings."
