= Battle of Ferkeh =

1896 battle of the Mahdist War

- Part of the Mahdist War
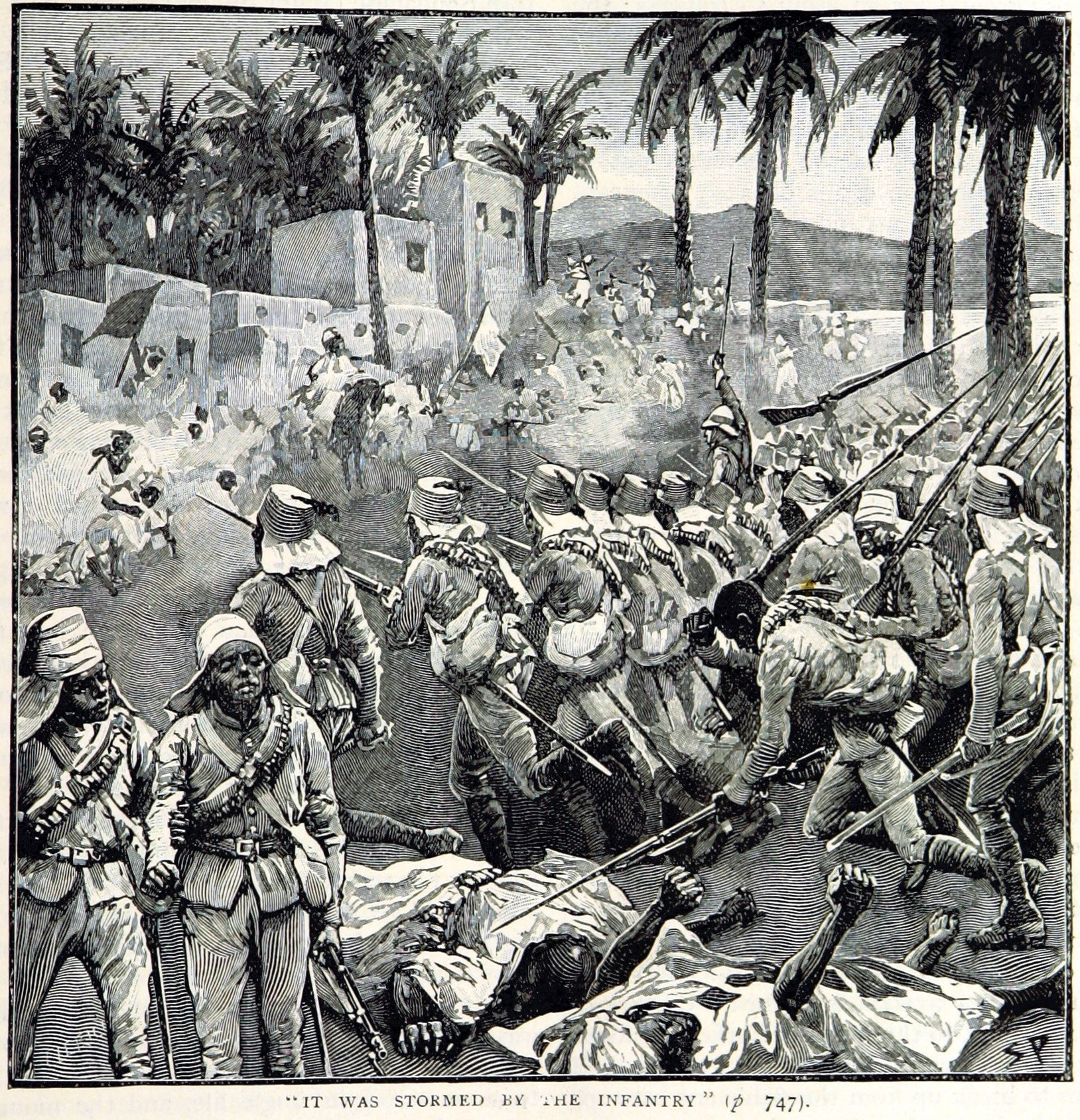
- Anglo-Egyptian troops storm the village of Ferkeh (illustration from a British book)
Date	7 June 1896
Location	near Dongola, Northern Sudan
Result	British–Egyptian victory

Belligerents
Mahdist State	United Kingdom; Egypt

Commanders and leaders
Osman Azrak; Hammuda Idris †	Sir Herbert Kitchener

Strength
3,000–4,000 men	9,000–9,500 men

Casualties and losses
44 emirs killed 4 emirs captured 800–1,500 soldiers killed 500 soldiers wounded 500–600 prisoners of war	20 soldiers killed 81–83 soldiers wounded

The Battle of Ferkeh (or Firket) occurred during the Mahdist War in which an army of Mahdists was surprised and routed by Egyptian forces, led by Sir Herbert Kitchener, on 7 June 1896. It was the first significant action of the reconquest of Sudan, which culminated in the September 1898 Battle of Omdurman.

== Background ==
In June 1896, at the start of the Sudan campaign, Kitchener's Anglo-Egyptian force was advancing on Dongola, in Northern Sudan. Ferkeh was a small fortified village on the banks of the Nile. It was the first important Mahdist position that was encountered and was occupied by 3,000 Mahdist warriors, led by the Emirs Hammuda Idris and Osman Azrak.

Kitchener's force, nominally in service of the Khedive of Egypt but in fact under direct British control, was composed of Egyptian and Sudanese soldiers, led by British officers. It numbered 9,000 men, accompanied by three batteries of field guns and one battery of Maxim guns. Apart from officers with the Egyptian Army, the Maxim battery were the only European troops present and was manned by detachments from the North Staffordshire Regiment and the Connaught Rangers. The latter, according to some sources, wore red coats, not khaki. If so, that would be the last time in which British troops fought in red (the Battle of Ginnis, on 30 December 1885, was the last time that it certainly occurred.)

== Battle ==
Kitchener divided his force into two columns. One was formed mostly of infantry and had to march along the Nile to attack Ferkeh from the North. The other consisted of cavalry, camel-mounted infantry and horse artillery units and was sent through the desert to attack from the Southeast. Both columns departed in the evening of the 6th and marched through the night, deploying at dawn in the morning of the 7th.

The attack caught the Mahdists completely by surprise, and they made only uncoordinated attacks against the deploying Egyptians during which Emir Hammuda was killed. Many of the Mahdists then turned and fled. The cavalry column should have cut off the retreat of the Mahdists, but the fleeing men were hidden from view by the terrain. Many, including Osman Azrak, made good their escape along the Nile. Other Mahdists stayed in their fortifications in the village and fought to the end. The Egyptians had to clear the position with bayonets.

The battle lasted less than three hours, from 04:30 to 07:20, and resulted in the deaths of 20 Egyptians and 800 to 1,000 Mahdists. Among the dead was the Mahdist general Hammuda Idris. About 500 prisoners of war were taken and several of them asked to join the Sudanese battallions of the Anglo-Egyptian Army at once.

== Aftermath ==
In strategic terms, Ferkeh was not a major battle since it was only an outpost of the Mahdist State that had been surprised and overrun. However, the battle had a significant psychological effect since it was the first substantial victory of the Egyptian Army after it had been reorganised by the British. Also, the battle showed that the Mahdist forces could be defeated, which boosted the Egyptian Army's morale, and unsettled their opponents at the onset of the reconquest campaign.

Those present were later awarded the Khedive's Sudan Medal with clasp 'Firket' and Queen Victoria's Sudan Medal.

== Bibliography ==
- Barthorp, Michael. (1984), War on the Nile, Blandford Press, London ISBN 0713713100
- Bruce, George. (1981), Harbottle's Dictionary of Battles, Van Nostrand Reinhold (ISBN 0-442-22336-6).
- Churchill, Winston S. (1899), The River War - an account of the Reconquest of the Sudan, volume I, Longmans, London.
- Grant, James; Atteridge, Andrew Hilliard (1899). British Battles on Land and Sea: 1874–1897. London, Paris & Melbourne: Cassell and Company – via Google Books.
- Joslin, Litherland and Simpkin (eds). (1988), British Battles and Medals, Spink ISBN 0907605257
- Ziegler, Philip (1974), Omdurman, Collins, London ISBN 0-00-211612-X
