= Gawaher =

Sudanese singer (born 1969)

Gawaher (جواهر)
- جواهر
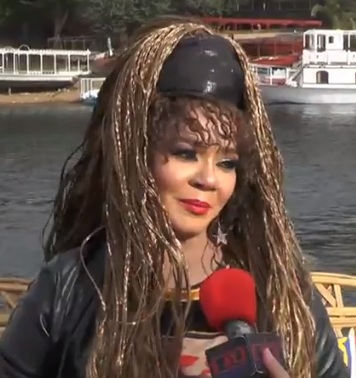
- Gawaher, February 2021
- Born: Gawaher Muhammad Ali Ahmed; 1969 (age 56–57); Dongola, Sudan
- Occupations: Singer and songwriter
- Years active: 1995–present
- Musical career
- Origin: Sudan
- Genres: Shaabi, Arabic pop, Folk, Pop-Folk
- Instruments: Vocals, Guitar
- Labels: Ibn Al Khatib, High Quality, Rotana

Gawaher (Arabic: جواهر Gawaher, born 1969) is a Sudanese singer and songwriter. She is known for blending Nubian and Shaabi music with sub-Saharan influences in Cairo since 1995.

== Early life ==
Gawaher was born in Dongola, Sudan. Shortly after her birth, her family moved to Port Sudan, where she spent most of her childhood and teenage years. From a young age, she showed a strong interest in music and regularly performed at her school celebrations. Gawaher holds dual Sudanese and Egyptian citizenship.

== Career ==
In 1995, Gawaher moved to Egypt, where the local music scene offered more opportunities for meeting artists and music labels. During her early years in Egypt, she performed at a hotel called Aswan as a singer and belly dancer for tourists. She was later introduced to Shaabi music, which she incorporated into her future projects.

Gawaher released her first studio album, Ḥikāyah Gharībah ("Strange Story "), in 1995 under the label Ibn Al Khatib. The album, recorded entirely in Sudanese Arabic, showcased traditional Nubian influences alongside sub-Saharan instrumentation. While the album did not achieve mainstream success, it attracted the attention of poets, producers, and publishers, who praised her voice. A local record label later released the album in Saudi Arabia in 1996.

In the same year, Gawaher released her second studio album, Marat al-'ayām. For this project, she collaborated with Sudanese composers and poets, whom she contributed to by writing several songs.

=== Transition to Shaabi ===
In 1997, Gawaher left Ibn Al Khatib, her former record label. In 1998, she signed with a larger label that collaborated with Egyptian singers such as Hamada Helal and Essam Karika. In that new phase of her career, she released "Telefonak", her third album, which is notable for a radical change of style from typical Sudanese melodies to Shaabi music. This album produced her first hit songs, including "Hamada." The success of these songs enabled her to record music videos and to perform on TV shows.

In 1999, Gawaher released "A Alkornĕyş," her fourth album, known for its titular track. The song was accompanied with a music video that was broadcast on Arabic music TV channels. Since then, her TV appearances became more frequent. This release included a collaboration with Ashraf Abdou, a regular producer of singers such as Mohammed Mounir, Latifa, and Hakim. Due to the production and increased media attention, Rotana, a pan-Arabic music giant, released the album in the Levant region and the Gulf states.

In 2001, for her new album "Samara," Gawaher collaborated with new producers such as Saleh Abu al-Dahab, who produced in the past songs for artists such as Mohammed Fouad and Amr Diab. The most successful song of this release is "Haylo," which turned into a hit.

In 2003, the singer released her sixth album, "Ana Laka," which was popular for its titular song and first single, which was also accompanied with a promotional video. This time, she balanced her habitually cheerful and typically Shaabi songs with deeper and more melancholic songs such as "Dawetek yama," dedicated to her mother.

=== Hiatus and comeback ===
From 2004 to 2008, Gawaher took four years of absence from the stage for personal reasons. Afterwards, she returned to the music scene with new collaborators such as Tarek Abdel Gaber, who previously composed songs for artists such as Sherine, Tamer Hosny, Samira Said, and Assala. "Enday," the title of the release, is noted for its return to African sounds and using Sudanese dialect. Gawaher took another hiatus for seven years until 2015. She started releasing new songs such as "Gany alasmarany," a version of a song originally sung by the Saudi singer Etab, her first song in the Khaleeji Arabic dialect. Her latest single, "Yadania w Hadany," was released in 2016.

== Discography ==
=== Studio albums ===
- Ħekaya Ğarib (1995)
- Maret Aleyam (1996)
- Telefonak (1998)
- A Alkornĕyş (1999)
- Samara (2001)
- Ana Laka (2003)
- Enday (2008)

=== Singles ===
- Ħekaya Ğarib (1995)
- Maret Aleyam (1996)
- Hamada (1998)
- Telefonak (1998)
- A Alkornĕyş (1999)
- Heylo (2001)
- Gawzahlo (2001)
- Al Korneish (2001)
- Samara (2001)
- Ana Laka (2003)
- Dawetek Yama (2003)
- Enday (2008)
- Gany el Asmarany (2015)
- Yadania w Hadany (2016)
