= Sudan Defence Force General Service Medal =

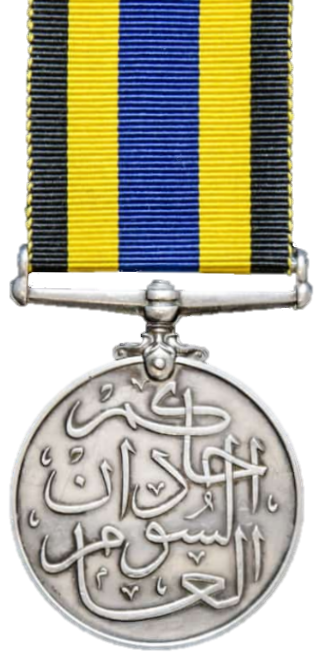
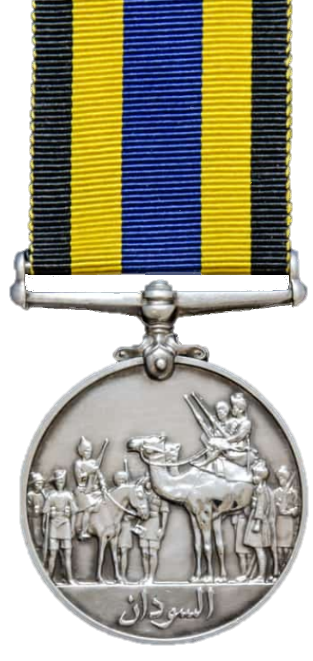
- Obverse and reverse of the medal
- Type: Campaign medal
- Presented by: the Governor-General of the Sudan
- Eligibility: Sudan Defence Force and police.
- Campaigns: Small campaigns, 1933-41
- Established: 1933
- Final award: 1941

Highlights
- Total recipients: Circa 9,000
- Ribbon bar
- Related: Khedive's Sudan Medal (1897); Khedive's Sudan Medal (1910)

The Sudan Defence Force General Service Medal was a campaign medal instituted in 1933 to reward service in minor operations within the Anglo-Egyptian Sudan. It was last awarded for service in 1941.

== Criteria ==
The medal was established in November 1933 by the Governor-General of the Sudan, it superseding the Khedive's Sudan Medal (1910). It was awarded on the recommendation of the Commandant of the Sudan Defence Force (SDF) to locally recruited personnel of the SDF, police and other approved Sudanese who served in minor operations classed by the Governor-General as of sufficient importance to warrant the grant of the medal.

All qualifying operations were within the Sudan, and included the combatting of Italian forces who encroached into the Southern Sudan from Italian East Africa between June 1940 and November 1941. Members of the SDF were also eligible for British World War II campaign medals.

No further awards were made after 1945, with the medal becoming obsolete with Sudanese independence in 1956.

In total, about 9,000 SDF General Service Medals were issued.

== Appearance ==
The medal is silver, 36 millimetres (1.4 in) in diameter with a plain, straight bar ribbon suspender. It has the following design:

Obverse: The seal of the Governor General of the Sudan, in Arabic script.

Reverse: A group of Sudanese soldiers, including two mounted on camels and one on horseback, with 'The Sudan' (in Arabic: السودان) below.

Naming: The medal was issued unnamed.

Ribbon: 31.7 millimetres (1.25 in) wide, with a central stripe of royal blue flanked by two yellow stripes, with a narrower black stripe at each edge.

Clasps: None were awarded.

Manufacture: Struck at the Royal Mint in London.
