= Charles Parsons (British Army officer) =

British Army officer in South Africa

Major-General Sir Charles Parsons KCMG CB FRGS
- Born: 9 May 1855; Shaldon
- Died: 25 June 1923 (aged 68); London
- Burial place: Exeter
- Military career
- Allegiance: United Kingdom
- Branch: Royal Artillery
- Service years: 1877–1906
- Rank: Major-General
- Commands: Governor, Red Sea Littoral 1896; Commander, British regular forces, Canada 1902–1906
- Conflicts: 1877–1879 Gaika War; 1879 Anglo-Zulu War; 1880–1881 First Boer War; 1882 Anglo-Egyptian War; 1896–1899 Conquest of Sudan; 1900–1902 Second Boer War
- Awards: Egypt Medal; Order of the Medjidie (1898); KCMG (1899); Order of the Bath (1906)

Major-General Sir Charles Sim Bremridge Parsons, KCMG, CB, FRGS (9 May 1855 – 25 June 1923) was an officer in the British Army, who spent most of his career serving in the African continent.

Commissioned into the Royal Artillery, he later specialised in logistics, particularly the use of railways, and became one of Lord Kitchener's trusted subordinates. In 1902, he was appointed Commander, British regular forces Canada, with the temporary rank of Major General; after he retired in 1906, these troops were withdrawn and Canada assumed full control of its own military.

== Life ==
Charles Parsons was born 9 May 1855, the elder son of John Parsons of Ringmore, a village near Shaldon in South Devon. Educated at Rugby School, he then entered the Royal Military Academy, Woolwich, which trained officers for the Royal Artillery and Royal Engineers.

He married Margaret Christian in 1898 and they had two daughters. After retiring in 1906, he was appointed a Companion of the Order of the Bath and later Commissioner of the Royal Hospital, Chelsea; he died on 25 June 1923.

== Career ==
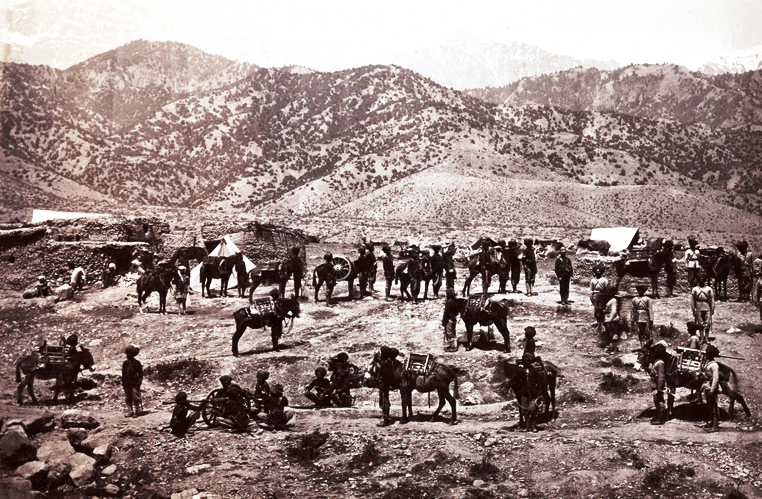
Mobile field battery in Afghanistan, 1879; Parsons commanded one similar in the Anglo-Zulu War

Parsons was commissioned into the Royal Artillery in 1876 and posted to South Africa, where he commanded mobile field batteries during the 1877-1879 Gaika War and 1879 Anglo-Zulu War, including the Battle of Isandhlwana. His unit, N battery, 5 Brigade, was selected to go with Lord Chelmsford's detachment; the other was left behind and all its members killed. N battery was involved in the Battle of Ulundi in July 1879.

In the 1880-1881 First Boer War, he fought in the British defeats of Laing's Nek and Ingogo or Schuinshoogte, where he was badly wounded. He returned to Egypt for the 1882 Egyptian campaign; he was present at Mahsama, Kassassin and Tel-el-Kebir and awarded the Egypt Medal; this campaign saw some significant technical innovations, including the construction of a military railway and telegraph lines.

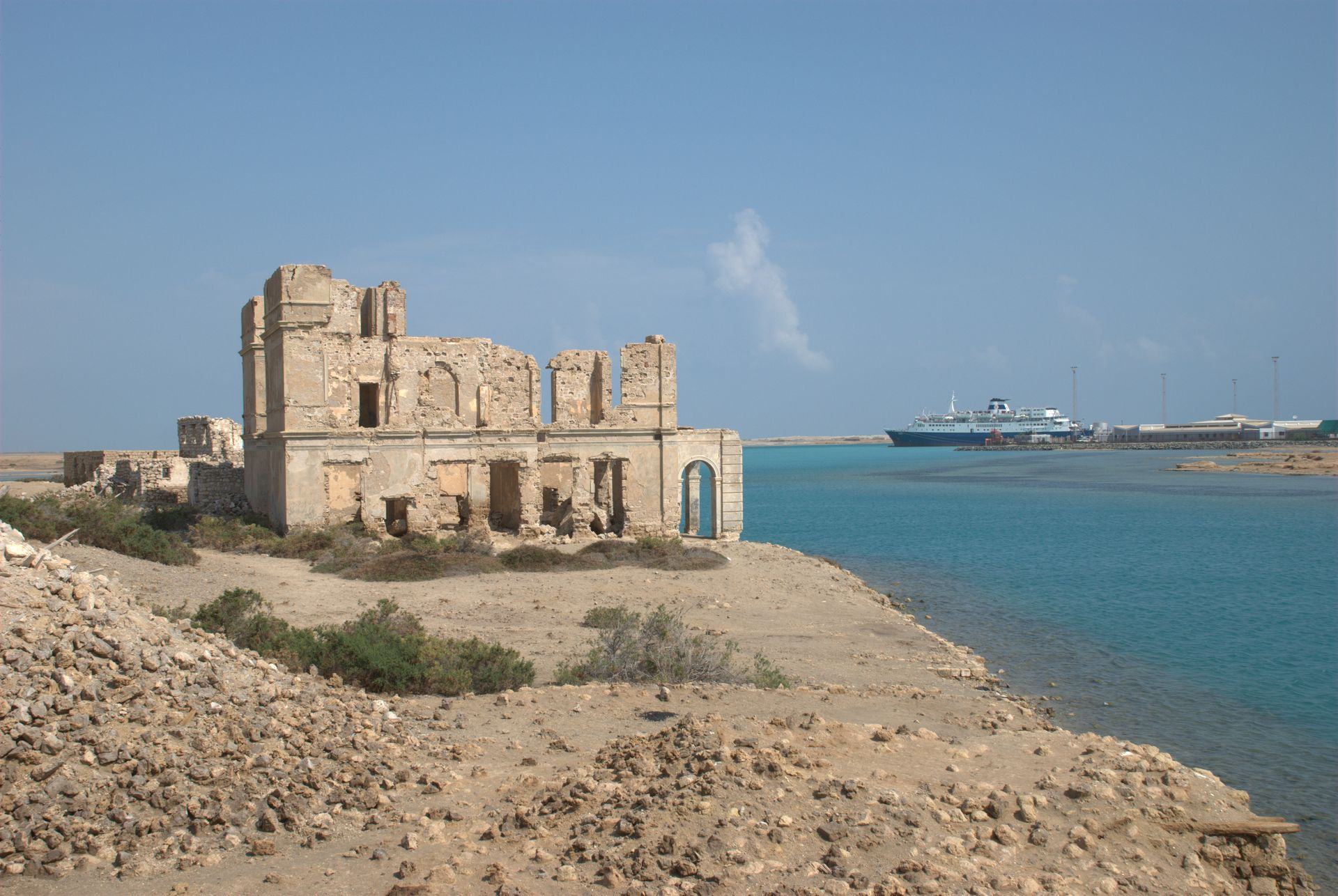
View of Suakin; Parsons was in charge of the key supply base for the Anglo-Egyptian conquest of Sudan

The Egyptian Army was then being reconstructed, with British officers filling key roles and Parsons took command of the artillery arm. Kitchener became Commander-in-Chief or Sirdar of the Egyptian military in 1892 and appointed him Governor of the Red Sea Littoral during the 1896-1899 Anglo-Egyptian conquest of Sudan; while this consisted of little more than the Port of Suakin, it was a key supply base and the hub of the railway built to supply the campaign. He later supervised the transfer of Kassala in Italian Eritrea to the Egyptian government, an adjustment made in return for British acceptance of Italian colonial claims in the Horn of Africa.

In September 1898, a British battalion commanded by Parsons took possession of the Sudanese town of Gedaref, first defeating a Dervish army of 3,500 men. This resulted in the award of the Ottoman Empire's Order of the Medjidie, Second Class, then made KCMG in 1899.

After leaving the Sudan, he was assistant adjutant-general at the Royal Arsenal, Woolwich, then Colonel of the Royal Artillery in Ireland before returning to South Africa during the 1900-1902 Second Boer War. He commanded a squadron of the Imperial Yeomanry in the November 1900 relief of Koffiefontein; this is referred to as "Parson's Pantomime" in "The Captive", Rudyard Kipling's 1902 short story on the Boer War.

Shortly after, Parsons was appointed Deputy Military Governor of Northern Cape Colony, Commandant of the West Kimberley District and Assistant Inspector-general, Southern lines of Communication. This was a significant role, where his previous experience was particularly relevant since the Boer War saw the first widespread use of railways for logistical support, rather than horses.

After a brief period in England as assistant adjutant-general at Woolwich, he ended his military career as staff Colonel, British forces in Canada, with the temporary rank of Major General. He was the last holder of this position; after 1906, the Dominions of Australia and Canada were given control over their own militaries and British forces withdrawn.

== Sources ==
- Churchill, Winston (1899). The River War Volume I. Longman.;
- Hall, Major DD (1979). "Artillery in the Zulu War; 1879". South African Military History Journal. 4 (4).
- Porter, Whitworth (1889). History of the Corps of Royal Engineers, Vol. II. Longmans, Green and Co.;
- Shaw, William Arthur (1970). The Knights of England: A Complete Record from the Earliest Time ..., Volume 1. Naval and Military Press. ISBN 978-1783311088.;
- Who was who. Vol. II (2014 ed.). Bloomsbury. 1962. ISBN 978-1408193372.
- Winton, Graham (2000). "The British Army, Mechanisation and a new transport systems 1900-1914". Journal of the Society for Army Historical Research. 78 (315).;
