= Dongola Reach =

Reach in Sudan

Coordinates: 19°15′0″N 30°30′0″E

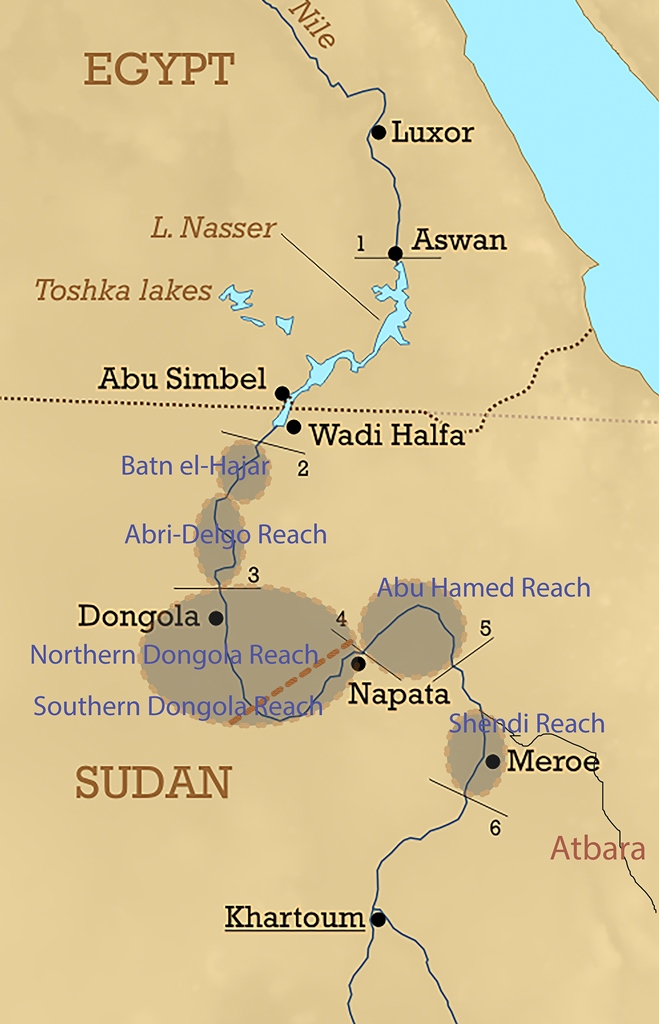
Physiographic zones corresponding to distinct Reaches in the Nile

The Dongola Reach is a reach of approximately 160 km in length stretching from the Fourth downriver to the Third Cataracts of the Nile in Upper Nubia, Sudan. Named after the Sudanese town of Dongola which dominates this part of the river, the reach was the heart of ancient Nubia.

== The Southern and the Northern Dongola Reach ==
The area where the Nile flows from the Fourth Cataract to the southwest making a great S-shaped bend following the structure of the Central African Shear Zone is the Southern Dongola Reach. The area where it flows northward out of the bend and through to the Third Cataract is the Northern Dongola Reach.

== Geography ==
In the Dongola Reach the Nile is without any significant perennial tributary inputs. It passes over mostly sandstone and is flanked by wide alluvial flood plains. In the Southern Dongola Reach the Nile is joined by the extinct river systems of Wadi Abu Dom, Wadi Muqaddam, Wadi Howar and Wadi Al-Malik. The Northern Dongola Reach contains cultivable basins on the eastern side of the Nile valley floor such as the Kerma Basin, a large fertile flood plain traversed by a series of palaeochannels.

== History ==
The Dongola Reach contains archaeological material from numerous cultural groups from across the history of the Middle Nile region, including the Kerma culture, the Kingdom of Kush, and the medieval kingdom of Makuria. The area of the Southern Dongola Reach served as a connection between the Red Sea in the east and Wadi Howar in the west, linking the Nile Valley with inner Africa. Abundant archaeological sites belonging to different archaeological periods area lined on the banks of old Nile channels in the Northern Dongola Reach. Affad 23 is an archaeological site located in the Affad region of southern Dongola Reach in northern Sudan, which hosts "the well-preserved remains of prehistoric camps (relics of the oldest open-air hut in the world) and diverse hunting and gathering loci some 50,000 years old".
