= Kerma Basin =

Coordinates: 19°36′0″N 30°24′0″E

The Kerma Basin is a fertile low-lying area just below the Third Cataract of the Nile in Northern State, Sudan. Extending over a distance of about 60 km it is a flood plain in the Dongola Reach creating the largest section of arable land between Aswan and the Fourth Cataract of the Nile. At maximum extent some 70,000 acres (283 km^{2}) can be inundated by the annual Nile flood, but a more regular year sees only about half that. This has led to a high population density in history that has long made the Kerma Basin one of the central portions of Nubia. The ancient city of Kerma was in the basin. During that period the Nile ran in channels spaced across the basin floor, increasing the amount of arable land and promoting the emergence of developed societies like the Kingdom of Kerma.
