= Egypt Medal =

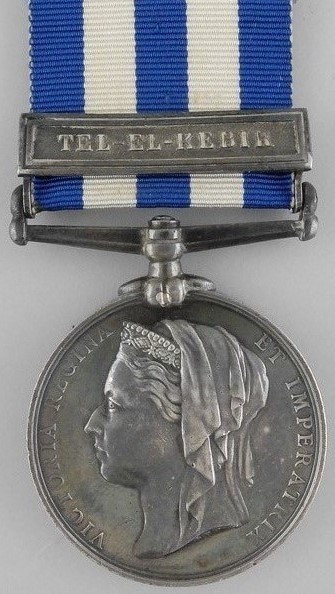
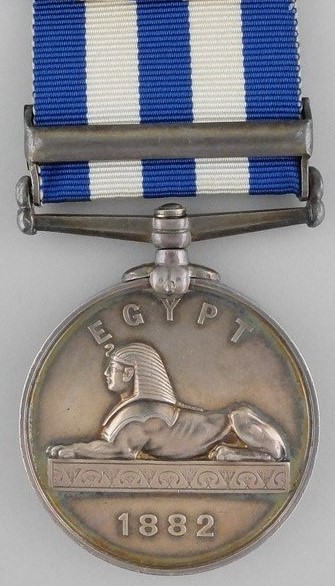
- Obverse and reverse of the 1882 medal
- Type: Campaign medal
- Awarded for: Campaign service
- Description: Silver, 36 mm in diameter
- Presented by: United Kingdom of Great Britain and Ireland
- Eligibility: British and Indian forces.
- Campaign: Egypt
- Clasps: Alexandria 11 July; Tel-El-Kebir; Suakin 1884; El-Teb; Tamaai; El-Teb-Tamaai; The Nile 1884–85; Abu Klea; Kirbekan; Suakin 1885; Tofrek; Gemaizah 1888; Toski 1889
- Established: 17 October 1882
- Ribbon bar of the medal
- Related: Khedive's Star

The Egypt Medal (1882–1889) was awarded for the military actions involving the British Army and Royal Navy during the 1882 Anglo-Egyptian War and in the Sudan between 1884 and 1889.

Resentment at increasing British and other European involvement in Egypt since the opening of the Suez Canal in 1869 triggered an Egyptian army mutiny that threatened the authority of the British-backed Khedive of Egypt, Tewfik Pasha. The British military intervention was in response, to protect British interests. Once in Egypt, the British became involved in the conflicts in the Sudan, which Egypt had occupied since the 1820s.

All recipients of the Egypt Medal were also eligible for one of the four versions of the Khedive's Star.

== Description ==
The medal had the following design:

- Circular, in silver and 36 millimetres (1.4 in) in diameter.
- Obverse: the veiled head of Queen Victoria with the Latin legend "VICTORIA REGINA ET IMPERATRIX". ('Victoria, Queen and Empress').
- Reverse: the Sphinx on a pedestal with the word 'EGYPT' above. Medals for the 1882 campaign had the year "1882" below the Sphinx. Awards for service in the Sudan from 1884 to 1889 were undated, although those already in possession of the 1882 medal had the relevant clasp added to their existing dated medal.
- Naming: the recipient's number, rank, name and regiment are engraved on the edge.
- Ribbon: 32 millimetres (1.25 in) wide, with three blue and two white stripes of equal width.

== Clasps ==
A total of 13 clasps were awarded, two for the Anglo-Egyptian War of 1882 and eleven for service in the Sudan between 1884 and 1889:

- Alexandria 11 July (1882)
- Tel-El-Kebir (13 September 1882)
- Suakin 1884 (19 February – 26 March 1884)
- El-Teb (29 February 1884)
- Tamaai (13 March 1884)
- El-Teb – Tamaai (29 February & 13 March 1884) For those present at both battles
- The Nile 1884–85 For service south of Assouan on or before 7 March 1885 as part of the expedition to relieve General Gordon, then under siege at Khartoum
- Abu Klea (17 January 1885) Only awarded in conjunction with clasp The Nile 1884–85
- Kirbekan (10 February 1885) Only awarded in conjunction with clasp The Nile 1884–85
- Suakin 1885 (1 March – 14 May 1885)
- Tofrek (22 March 1885) Only awarded in conjunction with clasp Suakin 1885
- Gemaizah 1888 (20 December 1888)
- Toski 1889 (3 August 1889)

Medals without clasp were awarded to:

- those who served in Egypt between 11 July and 14 September 1882, but were not present at the bombardment of Alexandria or the Battle of Tel-El-Kebir;
- all troops employed south of Wadi Halfa between 30 November 1885 and 11 January 1886 and south of Korosko on 3 August 1889.

== Recipients ==
While most of those who received the Egypt Medal were members of the British Regular Army or Royal Navy, other recipients included:

- Seventeen nurses who received the medal without clasp for their services in 1882 at Alexandria, Ismailia and in the hospital ship Carthage, including three awarded to foreign nurses. These were the first British campaign medals awarded to women, although a number of South Africa Medals were later awarded to nurses for the earlier 1877–79 campaign.
- 392 medals with clasp 'The Nile 1884–85', awarded to Canadian voyageurs employed on the Nile, of whom 46 also received the 'Kirbekan' clasp. This was the first overseas expedition by Canadians in a British imperial conflict. Employed as civilians who did not wear uniform, the voyageurs included 86 members of the First Nations, mostly Caughnawaga.
- 720 medals with clasp 'Suakin 1885', awarded to a force from New South Wales. This was the first occasion that Australian units were sent overseas and served alongside Imperial troops.

While few members of the Egyptian Army participated in earlier Sudanese campaigns, the majority of troops who received 'Gemaizah 1888' and 'Toski 1889' clasps belonged to the Egyptian Army, including newly raised Sudanese battalions, with one squadron of the 20th Hussars being the only British unit present at Toski.

== Khartoum Siege Medal ==
An unofficial decoration related to the Egypt Medal, this award in three grades was designed, minted and presented by General Gordon to the officers, soldiers and civilians who participated in the siege of Khartoum, 1884–85. Based on the badge of the Ottoman Order of the Medjidieh, the awards were produced locally during the siege and were fairly crude in form.

== See also ==
- 1882 Anglo-Egyptian War
- Mahdist War
