= Khedive's Sudan Medal (1897) =

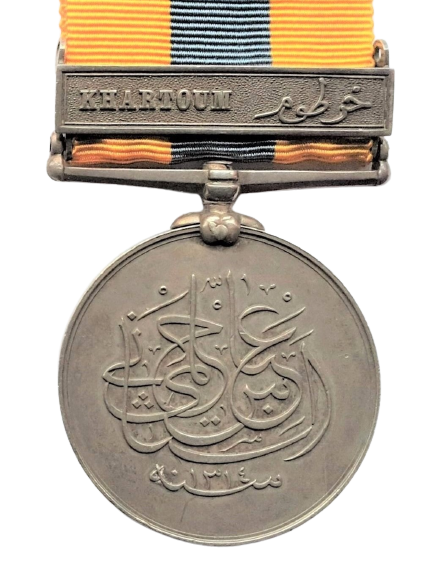
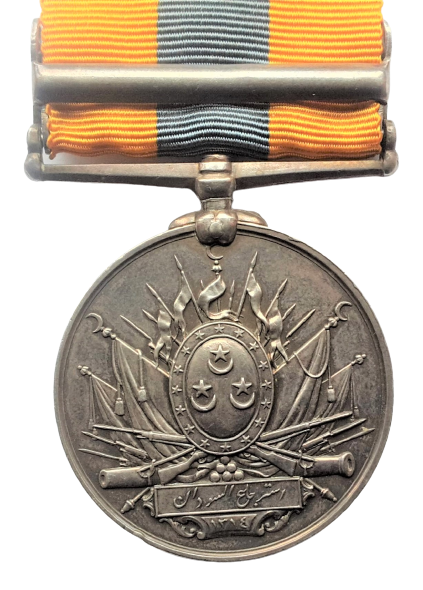
- Obverse (left) and reverse of the medal
- Type: Campaign medal
- Presented by: the Khedivate of Egypt
- Eligibility: Egyptian, British and Indian forces.
- Campaign: Anglo-Egyptian invasion of Sudan
- Clasps: Fifteen awarded
- Established: 1897
- Final award: 1908
- Ribbon bar of the medal
- Related: Khedive's Star; Queen's Sudan Medal; Khedive's Sudan Medal (1910); Sudan General Service Medal (1933)

The Khedive's Sudan Medal was a campaign medal awarded by the Khedivate of Egypt to both Egyptian and British forces for service during the reconquest of the Sudan, the final part of the Mahdist War. Established 12 February 1897 by Khedive Abbas Hilmi Pasha, this medal was initially to commemorate the reconquest of the Dongola province in 1896. It was subsequently authorised for later campaigns and actions until 1908. The medal was awarded with fifteen different clasps.

All those who received the Khedive's Sudan Medal for service on the Nile during 1896–98 also received the Queen's Sudan Medal.

== Appearance ==
The medal is circular, 39 millimetres in diameter, and awarded in silver to soldiers of the Egyptian and British armies, and in bronze to a small number of non-combatants, mainly grooms from the Indian Army and officers’ servants. The obverse bears the Arabic cypher of the Khedive, and the Hijri year 1314. The reverse shows an oval shield superimposed over a trophy of flags and arms. The medal hangs from a straight bar suspension.

For British troops, the recipient's name and details were engraved on the medal's edge. Those awarded to Egyptian and Sudanese recipients were named in Arabic script, although some, particularly later issues, were awarded unnamed.

The ribbon of the medal is 38 mm wide. It is yellow with a broad centre stripe of blue, representing the Nile flowing through the desert.

== Clasps ==
As many as ten clasps on one medal have been documented to members of the Egyptian Army. The medal is seldom seen with more than two clasps to British regiments since, apart from a number of small detachments, no British unit was present at more than two actions, the principal ones being the Atbara and Khartoum.
Fifteen different clasps were authorised and awarded:

- Firket (7 June 1896)
- Hafir (19-26 September 1896)
- Abu Hamed (7 July 1897)
- Sudan 1897
- The Atbara (8 April 1898)
- Khartoum (2 September 1898) (For the Battle of Omdurman)
- Gedaref (7 September to 26 December 1898)
- Gedid (22 November 1899)
- Sudan 1899
- Bahar-ed-Ghazal 1900–02
- Jerok (January to March 1902
- Nyam-Nyam (January to May 1905)
- Talodi (2-15 June 1905)
- Katfia (April 1908)
- Nyima (1-21 November 1908)

A number of medals were awarded with no clasp, including for service during 1896 to an Indian Army force based at Suakin, and to the crews of HMS Melita and HMS Scout, that served off the Sudanese coast during the same period.
