= Queen's Sudan Medal =

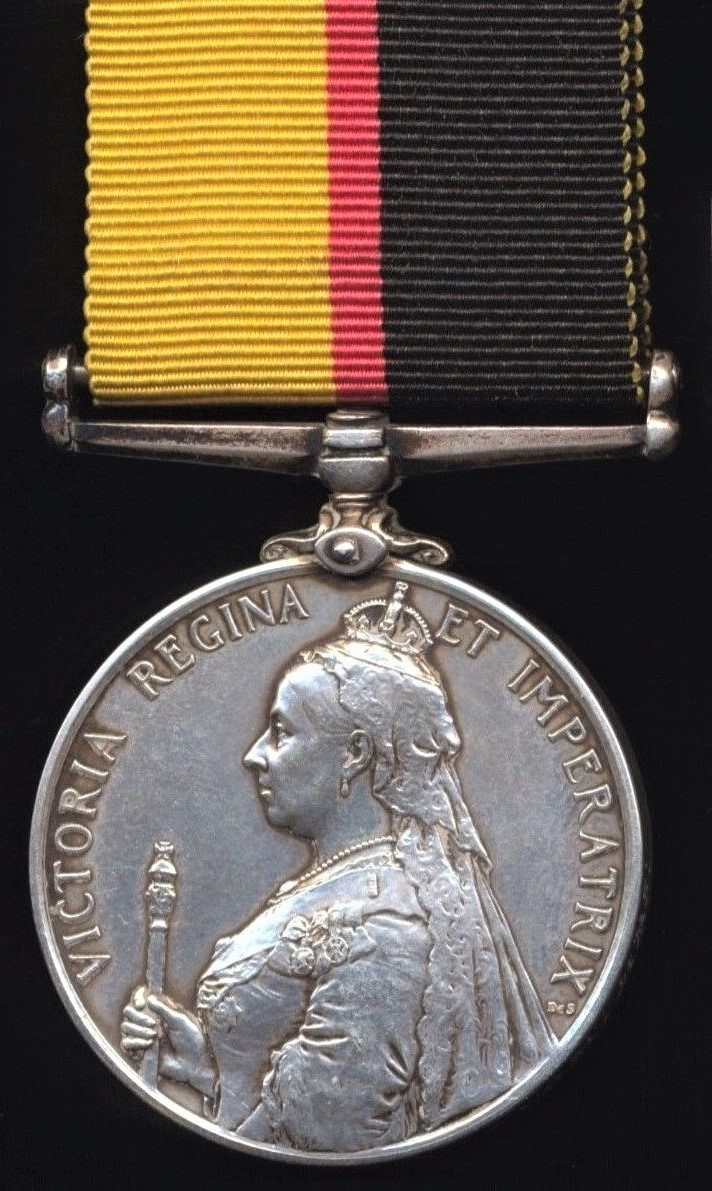
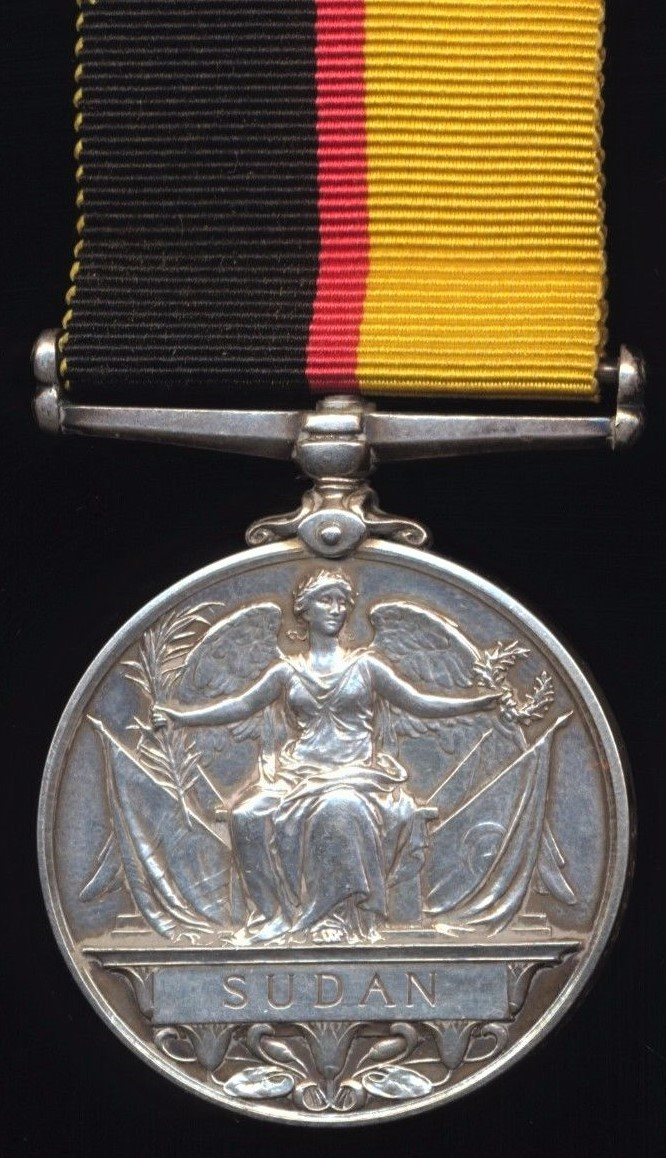
- Obverse and reverse of the medal
- Type: Campaign medal
- Awarded for: Campaign Service
- Description: Silver and Bronze, 36.5mm diameter
- Presented by: United Kingdom of Great Britain and Ireland
- Eligibility: British and Egyptian Troops
- Campaign: Sudan Campaign
- Clasps: none
- Established: 1899
- Ribbon bar of the medal

Precedence
- Next (higher): Ashanti Star
- Next (lower): East and Central Africa Medal
- Related: Khedive's Sudan Medal

The Queen's Sudan Medal was authorised in March 1899 and awarded to British and Egyptian forces which took part in the Sudan campaign between June 1896 and September 1898.

The campaign reflected the British desire to reverse the defeats of the Mahdist War in the 1880s, as well as concern that France and other European powers would take advantage of Sudan's instability to acquire parts of its territory. Initially only the Egyptian Army was engaged. British Army units joined from early 1898, with two British brigades being present at the decisive victory at Omdurman on 2 September 1898, in which Winston Churchill took part. Seventeen members of the Royal Navy and 27 Royal Marines who helped man the Nile gunboats also received the medal.

The medal was awarded in silver to soldiers of the British and Egyptian armies, and in bronze to a small number of non-combatants, comprising authorised followers, officers’ servants and grooms from the Indian Army.

All recipients of the Queen's Medal also received the Khedive's Sudan Medal.

== Description ==
- A circular medal, 36.5 millimetres (1.44 in) in diameter, designed by G. W. de Saulles.
- Obverse: a half length crowned figure of Queen Victoria with the legend VICTORIA REGINA ET IMPERATRIX.
- Reverse: a plinth inscribed SUDAN supported by Nile lilies, where a figure of victory sits holding a laurel wreath and a palm branch. Behind her are the British and Egyptian flags.
- Ribbon: 31.7 millimetres (1.25 in) wide ribbon is half yellow, half black with a thin dividing red stripe.
- Clasps: none were awarded.
- Naming: the recipient's name and details were engraved on the edge. Those awarded to Egyptian and Sudanese troops were named in Arabic script, with some awarded unnamed.
