= Dongola =

Capital of Northern Sudan

Dongola دنقلا
- Town
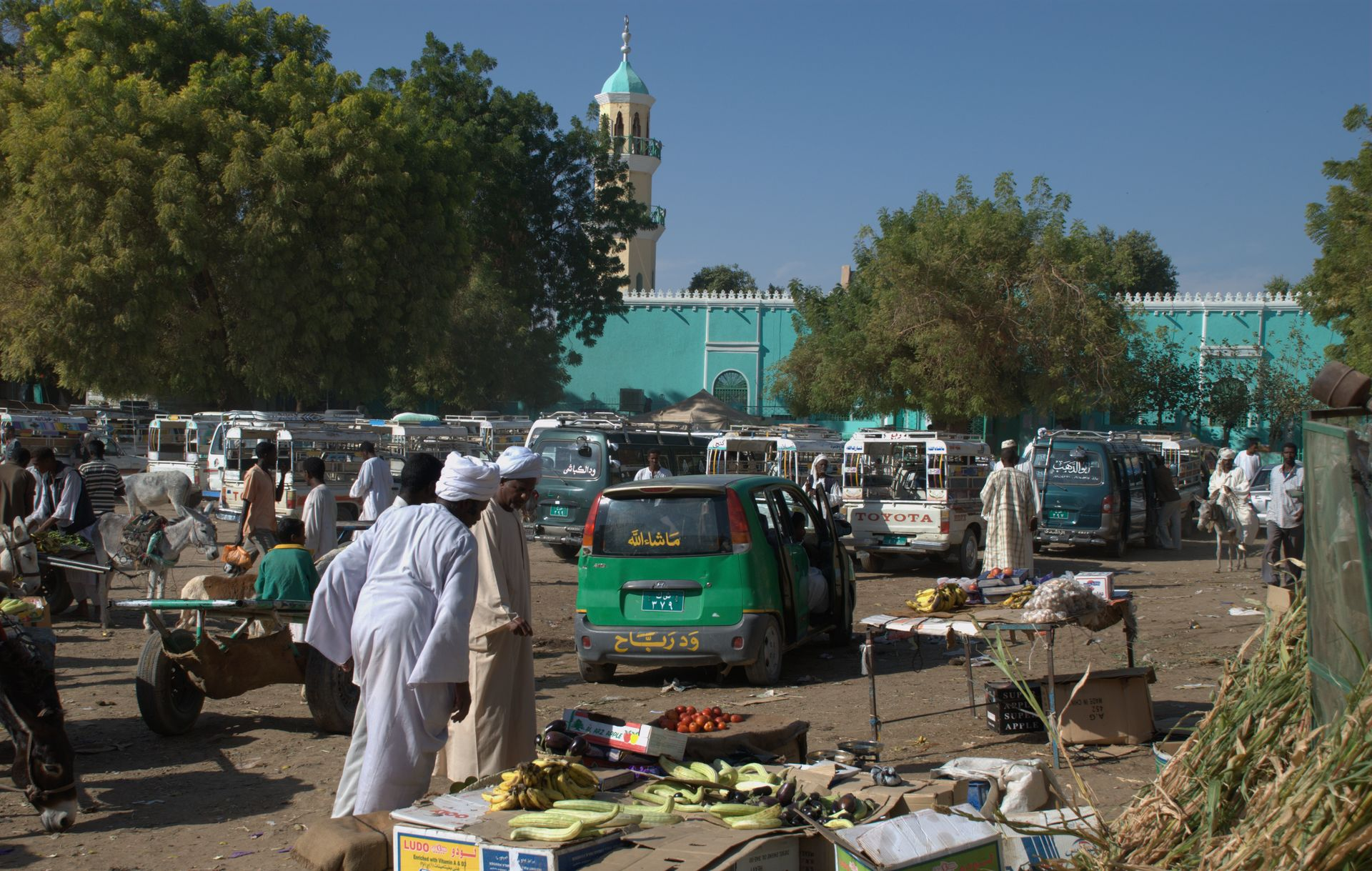
- Dongola market

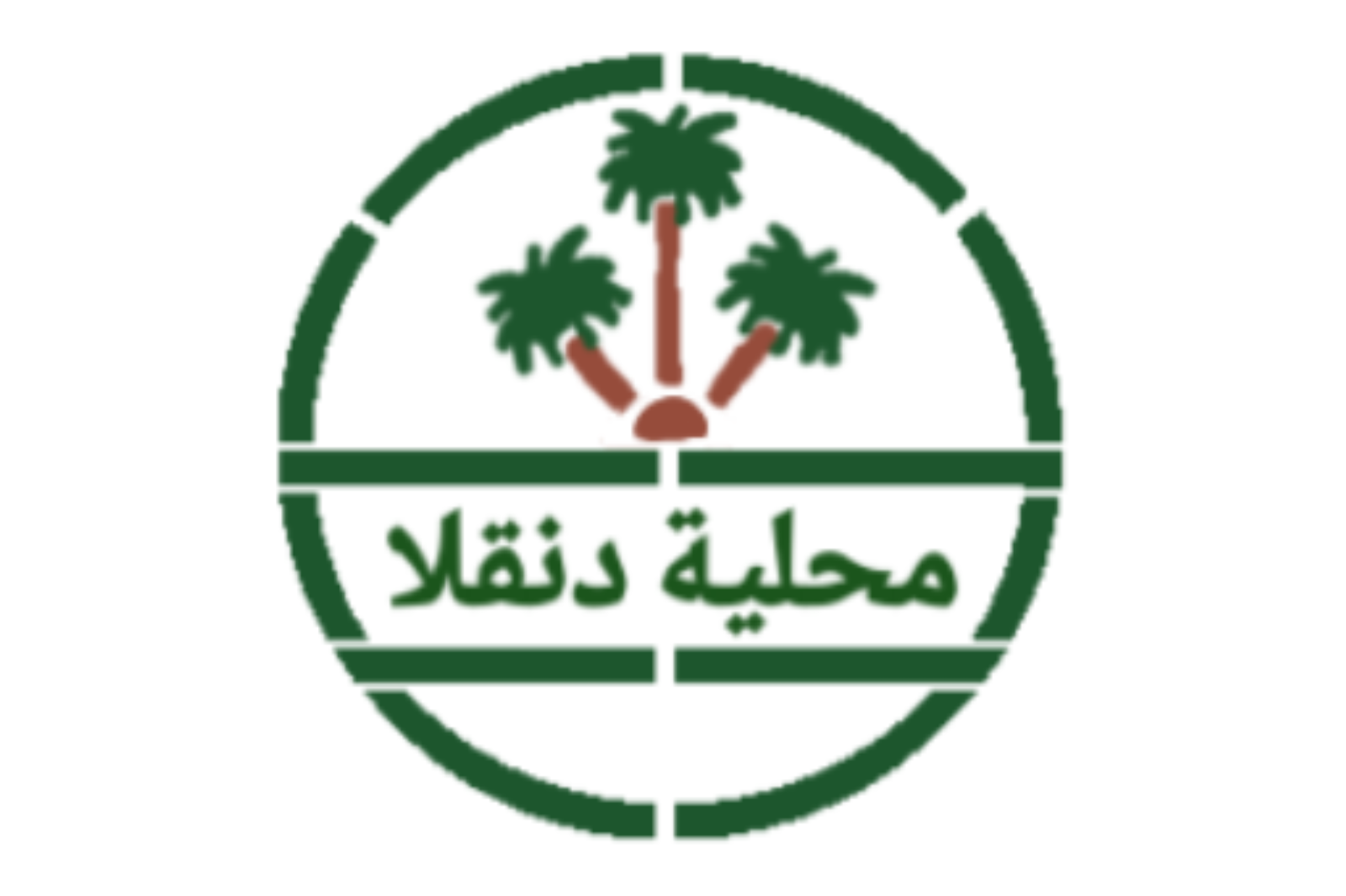
- Flag

- Location in Sudan
- Coordinates: 19°10′11.37″N 30°28′29.62″E
- Country: Sudan
- State: Northern

Population (2008)
  - Total: 56,167
- Demonym: Dongolawis

Dongola (Dongolawi: ⲇⲟⲩⲛⲅⲟⲩⲗⲁ, Arabic: دنقلا, romanized: Dunqulā), also known as Urdu or New Dongola, is the capital of Northern State in Sudan, on the banks of the Nile. It should not be confused with Old Dongola, a now deserted medieval city located 80 km upstream on the opposite bank.

== Etymology ==
There are many different theories about where the word Dongola comes from. One theory is that it comes from Nubian word "Doñqal" which means red brick, and refers to the houses in Dongola being built of red bricks as other towns around it were built from mud bricks. Other theory suggests that the name means "the heart of a palm tree" Third theory suggest that the name comes from the combination of two Nubian words dungi, Meaning money and la being a negative particle, thus the name meaning a place without money.

== History ==
In the medieval period the region was controlled by the Christian kingdom of Makuria, which until the mid-14th century had its capital at Old Dongola further south. Subsequently, Old Dongola became the capital of a smaller kingdom which was integrated into the Islamic Funj Sultanate in the 16th century, which ruled the region until the late 18th century. By the 1820s the town was virtually abandoned.

In 1812 the Mamluks arrived in the Dongola region after they were forced out from Egypt by Muhammad Ali Pasha, establishing a small state. As their capital they chose the small town of Maragha. Growing significantly, it came to be known as Dongola Urdu, New Dongola. In 1820 Muhammad Ali Pasha invaded Sudan and the Mamluks, numbering only 300 men, abandoned the town and fled to the south. The Egyptians made Dongola a provincial capital, which it remained until the outbreak of the Mahdist revolt in the 1880s.

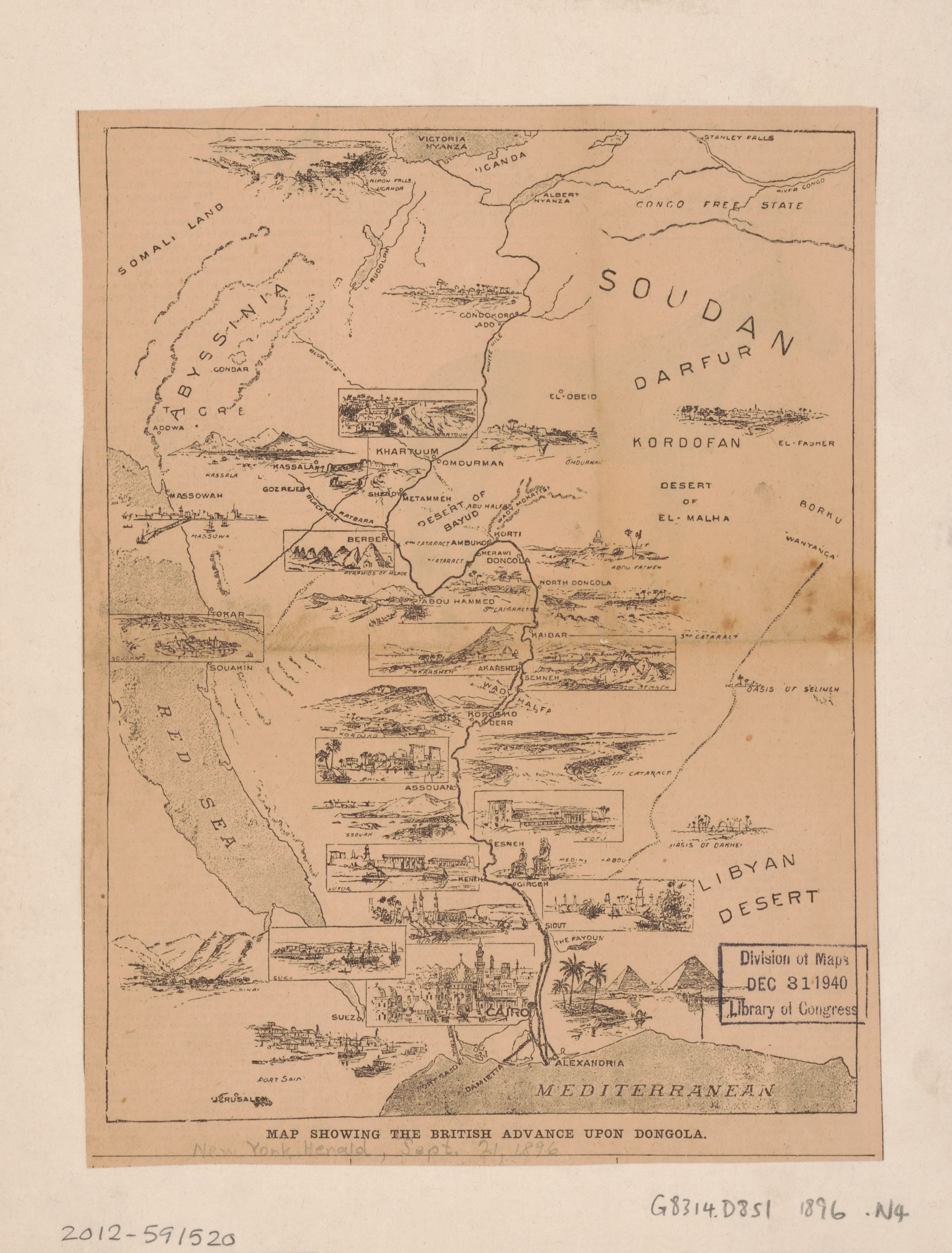
Map showing the British advance upon Dongola

The Nile Expedition of 1884–1885 to relieve Gordon at Khartoum passed through the area. Regiments were challenged to race up the river by boat, and this gave rise to the English regatta competition of dongola racing.

Dongola was the scene of a victory by Brigadier Sir Herbert H. Kitchener over the indigenous Mahdist Muslim tribes in 1896 who later turned it into a British-Egyptian army base with the objective of collecting and storing weapons, gear and resources. Dongola was a considered an all time base for sending campaign reports to Britain, and the first English press release was issued in the name of Dongola Star, with news of the British-Egyptian army in Sudan. Kitchener's forces were known for their mercilessness, killing over 15,000 Mahdist troops in the Battle of Omdurman in 1898, and later on proceeded to kill the wounded, raising the overall death toll to over 50,000.

Dongola Road and Dongola Avenue in the Bishopston area of Bristol were named after this event; as was Dongola Road in Tottenham, North London, which runs next to Kitchener Road. There is also a Dongola Road in Jersey (Channel Islands). There is a Dongola Road in Plaistow, East London. There is also a Dongola Road in Ayr, Scotland. In the United States, Dongola, Illinois was established in the 1850s, and named for Dongola. There is also a Dongola Lane in Shakopee, Minnesota, and a Dongola Hwy. in Conway, South Carolina.

== Transport ==
The trans-African automobile route — the Cairo-Cape Town Highway passes through Dongola.

== Notable people ==
- Gawaher
- Muhammad Ahmed

== Climate ==
Dongola has a hot desert climate (Köppen climate classification BWh) as it is located in the Sahara Desert, one of the hottest, sunniest and driest regions in the world. The temperature is warm or hot year-round, with January, the coolest month, having a mean of 17.6 °C (63.7 °F) and an average low of 8.5 °C (47.3 °F). June has the highest average high of 43.4 °C (110.1 °F), while August has the highest average low at 25.2 °C (77.4 °F). On 22 June 2010, Dongola recorded a temperature of 49.7 °C (121.5 °F), which is the highest temperature that has been recorded in Sudan. The lowest recorded temperature was −2.7 °C (27.1 °F) in January.

Dongola receives only 12.3 millimetres (0.48 in) of precipitation annually because of its arid location. September is the wettest month, receiving 7.7 millimetres (0.30 in) of rain on average. Rainfall is sporadic but more likely to occur in the summer. Six months receive no precipitation at all. Humidity is low year-round, but it is higher in winter. Dongola receives 3813.8 hours of sunshine annually, which is 87% of all possible sunshine. June has the most sunshine and September has the least.

Climate data for Dongola (1991–2020 normals, extremes 1961–2020)
Month	Jan	Feb	Mar	Apr	May	Jun	Jul	Aug	Sep	Oct	Nov	Dec	Year
Record high °C (°F)	39.4 (102.9)	42.4 (108.3)	46.4 (115.5)	47.2 (117.0)	48.8 (119.8)	49.7 (121.5)	49.0 (120.2)	49.4 (120.9)	48.0 (118.4)	45.0 (113.0)	41.5 (106.7)	37.6 (99.7)	49.6 (121.3)
Mean daily maximum °C (°F)	27.0 (80.6)	29.8 (85.6)	34.1 (93.4)	38.6 (101.5)	42.4 (108.3)	43.6 (110.5)	43.3 (109.9)	43.2 (109.8)	42.4 (108.3)	39.4 (102.9)	32.6 (90.7)	28.1 (82.6)	37.0 (98.6)
Daily mean °C (°F)	18.4 (65.1)	20.7 (69.3)	24.8 (76.6)	29.4 (84.9)	33.5 (92.3)	34.9 (94.8)	35.2 (95.4)	35.7 (96.3)	34.6 (94.3)	31.4 (88.5)	24.4 (75.9)	19.7 (67.5)	28.6 (83.5)
Mean daily minimum °C (°F)	9.9 (49.8)	11.7 (53.1)	15.4 (59.7)	20.1 (68.2)	24.6 (76.3)	26.1 (79.0)	27.2 (81.0)	28.3 (82.9)	26.8 (80.2)	23.4 (74.1)	16.2 (61.2)	11.4 (52.5)	20.1 (68.2)
Record low °C (°F)	−2.7 (27.1)	1.0 (33.8)	4.3 (39.7)	8.4 (47.1)	12.6 (54.7)	17.3 (63.1)	19.3 (66.7)	18.0 (64.4)	16.6 (61.9)	11.4 (52.5)	6.0 (42.8)	2.1 (35.8)	−2.7 (27.1)
Average precipitation mm (inches)	0.0 (0.0)	0.0 (0.0)	0.1 (0.00)	0.0 (0.0)	0.3 (0.01)	0.0 (0.0)	4.9 (0.19)	4.1 (0.16)	1.4 (0.06)	0.4 (0.02)	0.3 (0.01)	0.0 (0.0)	11.5 (0.45)
Average precipitation days (≥ 1.0 mm)	0.0	0.0	0.0	0.0	0.1	0.0	0.6	0.7	0.2	0.1	0.0	0.0	1.8
Average relative humidity (%)	32	26	20	17	16	15	20	22	20	22	28	33	22
Average dew point °C (°F)	1.4 (34.5)	0.5 (32.9)	0.3 (32.5)	1.8 (35.2)	4.2 (39.6)	4.4 (39.9)	8.8 (47.8)	10.7 (51.3)	8.3 (46.9)	7.1 (44.8)	4.7 (40.5)	3.0 (37.4)	4.6 (40.3)
Mean monthly sunshine hours	310.0	285.6	319.3	318.0	325.5	330.0	334.8	288.3	273.0	310.0	312.0	316.2	3,722.7
Source: NOAA
