= Idris Jamma' =

Sudanese poet (1922-1980)

Idress Muhammed Jamma
- Native name: إدريس جماع
- Born: 1 January 1922 Halfaya al-Muluk, Khartoum North, Democratic Republic of the Sudan
- Died: 27 March 1980 (aged 58) Halfaya al-Muluk, Khartoum North, Democratic Republic of the Sudan
- Occupation: poet; teacher
- Language: Arabic

Idress Muhammed Jamma' (Arabic: إدريس محمد جماع, romanized: Idress Muḥammed Jammaʻ; 1 January 1922 – 27 March 1980) was a Sudanese poet whose only collection of poems, which is titled The Lasting moments (Arabic: لحظات باقية), was published in 1969. Jamma' was born and raised in Halfaya al-Muluk, Khartoum North, in a notable family. He graduated from Teachers College in Bakht al-Ruda in Ed Dueim in the late 1930s. He worked as a schoolteacher in the 1940s, continued his higher education in Egypt in Dar al-Ulum until 1951 and returned to teaching in Sudan. In his later years, Jamma' was affected by a disorder of consciousness and died at the age of 58 in his hometown.

== Biography ==
=== Early years ===
Idress Muhammed Jamma' was born and raised in Halfaya al-Muluk, Khartoum North, Democratic Republic of the Sudan on 1 January 1922. He descends from the Sheikhs of the Halfayah, Abdallabi tribe, and his nasab (patronymic name) is Idris bin Muhammad bin Al-Amin bin Nasser bin Al-Amin bin Mismar. He joined Sheikh Muhammad Nur Ibrahim's kuttab and then attended primary school. He continued his studies at Omdurman Middle School in 1934 but his family's finances were limited so he did not stay more than two months. In 1936 he enrolled in the teachers' training college at University of Bakhtalruda in Ed Dueim.

=== Middle years ===
After graduating in 1941, Jamma' was appointed as a teacher at Tangasi Island, Northern state; he then worked at Khartoum Primary School and Halfaya Al-Muluk in 1944 in his hometown. In 1947, Jamma' resigned from the Sudanese Ministry of Education, migrated to Egypt and joined the Teachers Institute in Zaytoun, then Dar al-Ulum, and in 1951 he obtained a Bachelor of Art in Arabic language, literature and Islamic studies. Jamma' returned to Sudan and worked a teacher at the Institute of Education in Shendi in 1952, then transferred to University of Bakhtalruda in 1955, then he returned to Khartoum, and finally Khartoum North in 1956.

=== Final years and death ===
It is unknown if Jamma wrote poetry after he began suffering from a disorder of consciousness in the early 1960s, which lasted until his death. In his last years, Jamma' was subjected to enormous psychological shocks, which he did not disclose. He isolated himself from people after he suffered a stupor that progressed into a disorder of consciousness. Jamma' died at Khartoum North Hospital on 27 March 1980.

== Poetry ==
Idress Jamma' was a distinguished Sudanese poet of the 20th century, though he published only one poetry collection. He wrote many famous poems, some of which were sung by a number of Sudanese and other singers, and others have been included in Arabic-language literature curricula in Sudan. His poetry is characterized by excessive lyricism and clear language. He is one of the closest poets to the Al-Tijani Yusuf Bashir School of Poetry.

Jamma''s only published poetry collection is titled The Last moments (Arabic: لحظات باقية), and was published in 1969. It was collected by some of his friends and relatives because he was unable to do so due to his poor health. According to a 2015 Dictionary of Modern Arabic Literature, Jamma''s poetry is characterized by transparent sadness; according to the same source:

He is a realistic poet who is well-versed in his language and style. Some of his poems are characterized by the reflection and depth he gained from his harsh experiences and miserable life ... faithful to classical [Arabic] poetry until the last breath. He was against ambiguity.

He also wrote political poetry. According to Al Babtain Dictionary:

His poetry is a true expression of his conscience and his nation's sentiments, in which he described various human feelings, joy, pain, and sadness. He also described the National Revolution,, who is ardent of the freedom of his homeland and the dignity of his nation. In his poetry, he described a beautiful connection between Sudan and his Arab and Islamic nation. He addressed Algeria, Egypt and Palestine, and stormed the issues of liberation in the world. In his poetry there is tenderness, sincerity of emotion, and beauty of imagination.

—

Sudanese novelist Imad Bulayk said Jamma' had a character that combined the romantic and national movements in his poetry, but beauty and love were the center of his poems, "which overflows with charming meanings in this context".
