= Order of the Two Niles =

Sudanese state decoration

Order of the Two Niles وسام النيلين
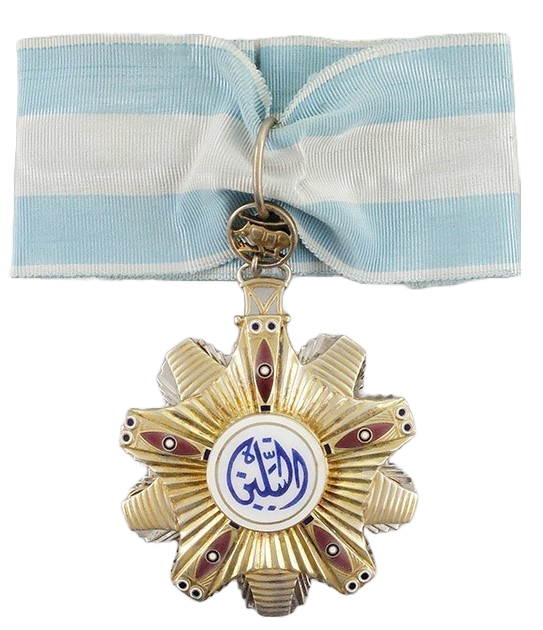
- Badge of the Grand Cordon

Awarded by Sudan
- Type: Order of Merit
- Established: 16 November 1961; 64 years ago
- Country: Sudan
- Awarded for: Providing great services to the state
- Status: Currently constituted
- Classes: Grand Cordon (Class I); Grand Officer (Class II); Commander (Class III); Officer (Class IV); Knight (Class V)

Precedence
- Next (higher): Order of the Republic
- Next (lower): Order of Merit, Order of Distinction, or Order of Righteous Son of Sudan
- Ribbon bar of the order

The Order of the Two Niles (Arabic: وسام النيلين, romanized: Wisām an-Nīlayni) is a state decoration of Sudan established on 16 November 1961 during Ibrahim Abboud's military government. The Order of the Two Niles – White and Blue Niles – is Sudan's second-highest honour after the Order of the Republic. The order is given to Sudanese and foreigners, civilians and military, who provided great services to the state. The order has five classes.

== Classes ==
Name	Image	Notes
Class I, Grand Cordon		Awarded to the head of state and ambassadors to Sudan at the end of their office term.
Class II, Grand Officer		Given to ministers and generals.
Class III, Commander		Awarded to colonels, lieutenant colonels, and civilians of similar rank.
Class IV, Officer		Awarded to majors and captains and civilians of similar rank.
Class V, Knight		Awarded to lieutenants and below and civilians of similar rank.

== Insignia ==
The star, sash, and badge make up the First Class insignia. The star has ten points and is covered in gold. A ten-ended star is created by superimposing two five-pointed stars with truncated rays on top of one another. The surfaces of the stars are covered with vertical and, consequently, horizontal rays. The star consists of four layers and is particularly huge (102 mm) and heavy (8 1/2 ozs). A 40 mm white medallion sits in the middle with the inscription in dark blue: "El Nilein Arabic: النيلين", or "The Two Niles" in Arabic calligraphy. The gold medallion is attached to the ribbon by means of a transition element in the form of a rhinoceros pendant. Rhinoceros was the Republic of Sudan emblem until it became the Democratic Republic of Sudan and changed the emblem in 1985 to a secretarybird. The ribbon is Royal blue moiré with two 5 mm white stripes toward each edge and is 51 mm wide. The badge is of the same pattern but smaller, measuring 58 mm across.

Class II consists of the star and a neck badge, Class III consists of a neck badge, and Class IV and V consist of chest badges. The insignia is made by Garrard & Co (London, England), Eng Leong Medallic Industries and Bichay (Cairo, Egypt).

== Notable recipients ==
=== Class I: Grand Cordon ===
- 1972 Burgess Carr for his role in mediating the Addis Ababa Agreement (1972)
- 1979 Ahmed Mohamed El Hassan
- 1988 Akef El-Maghraby
- 1999 Abdul Rahman Al-Sumait
- 2000 Jacques Diouf
- 2001 Amr Moussa
- 2001 Saleh Abdullah Kamel
- 2002 Stefan Jakobielski
- 2009 Essa Abdulla Al Basha Al Noaimi
- 2013 Suleiman Jasir Al-Herbish
- 2013 Deepak Vohra
- 2015 Hassan Ahmed Al Shehhi
- 2015 OPEC Fund for International Development
- 2016 Ghaith bin Moubarak Al-Kuwari
- 2016 Taleb Rifai
- 2016 Mohammed Matar Salem Al Kaabi
- 2016 Abdalrhaman Salih El-Benian
- 2017 Ghanem bin Shaheen Al-Ghanim
- 2017 Tareq bin Mosa la Zedjali
- 2018 Marta Ruedas
- 2018 Osama Shaltout
- 2018 José Graziano da Silva
- 2020 Mian Dutt
- 2020 Yevgeny Prigozhin
- 2021 Al-Hussein Ould Sidi Abdullah
- 2021 Emmanuel Platman
- 2021 Ahmed Ali Bri
- 2021 Ravdendra Prasad Jaswal
- 2022 Alberto Ucelay
- 2022 Abdul-Rahman bin Ali Al-Kubaisi
- 2022 İrfan Neziroğlu
- 2022 Hossam Issa
- 2022 Bassam Al-Qabandi
- 2022 Ma Xinmin
- 2022 Patricia Maria Oliveira
- 2023 Vladimir Zheltov
- 2023 Lee Sang-Jeong
- Jean-Bédel Bokassa
- Koča Popović
- Norman Jackson
- Adel Abdalaziz Al-Rshoud

=== Class II: Grand Officer ===
- 1985 Bob Geldof
- 2002 Lech Krzyżaniak
- 2004 Ahmed H. Zewail
- 2006 William Y. Adams
- 2012 Sabah Al-Khalid Al-Sabah
- 2019 Ibrahim Osman El-Amir
- 2023 David Beasley

=== Class III: Commander ===
- 1972 Abdalah Grosh
- Arthur Young
- Jamal al-Faisal
- Kamil Idris

=== Unknown class ===
- 1965 Anthony Derrick Parsons
- 1973 Sérgio Vieira de Mello
- 1974 Faisal bin Sultan Al Qassimi
- 1980 James Rodgers Allen
- 1984 Clive Kelday Smith
- 1988 Ahmad Fathi Sorour
- 1989 Mohamed Hamad Satti
- 1989 Daoud Mustafa Khalid
- 1990 Muhammed Saleh Abdul-Wahab
- 2001 Hosny El-Lakany
- 2001 Salim Ahmed Salim
- 2004 Peter Lewis Shinnie
- 2004 Ergon agathon
- 2005 Sepp Blatter
- 2005 Abdulaziz bin Ahmed Al Saud
- 2007 Raymond Stewart
- 2009 Rodolphe Adada
- 2016 Bashir Hassan Bashir
- 2017 Samora Yunis
- 2017 Abdillahi Omar Bouh
- 2017 Mohammad Al-Khodher
- 2018 Rashid Abdullah Al Nuaimi
- Abdel Halim Mohamed
- Sarabamon
- Pope Shenouda III of Alexandria
- Branko Mamula
- Jean Leclant
