= Essa Abdulla Al Basha Al Noaimi =

Emirati diplomat (born 1956)

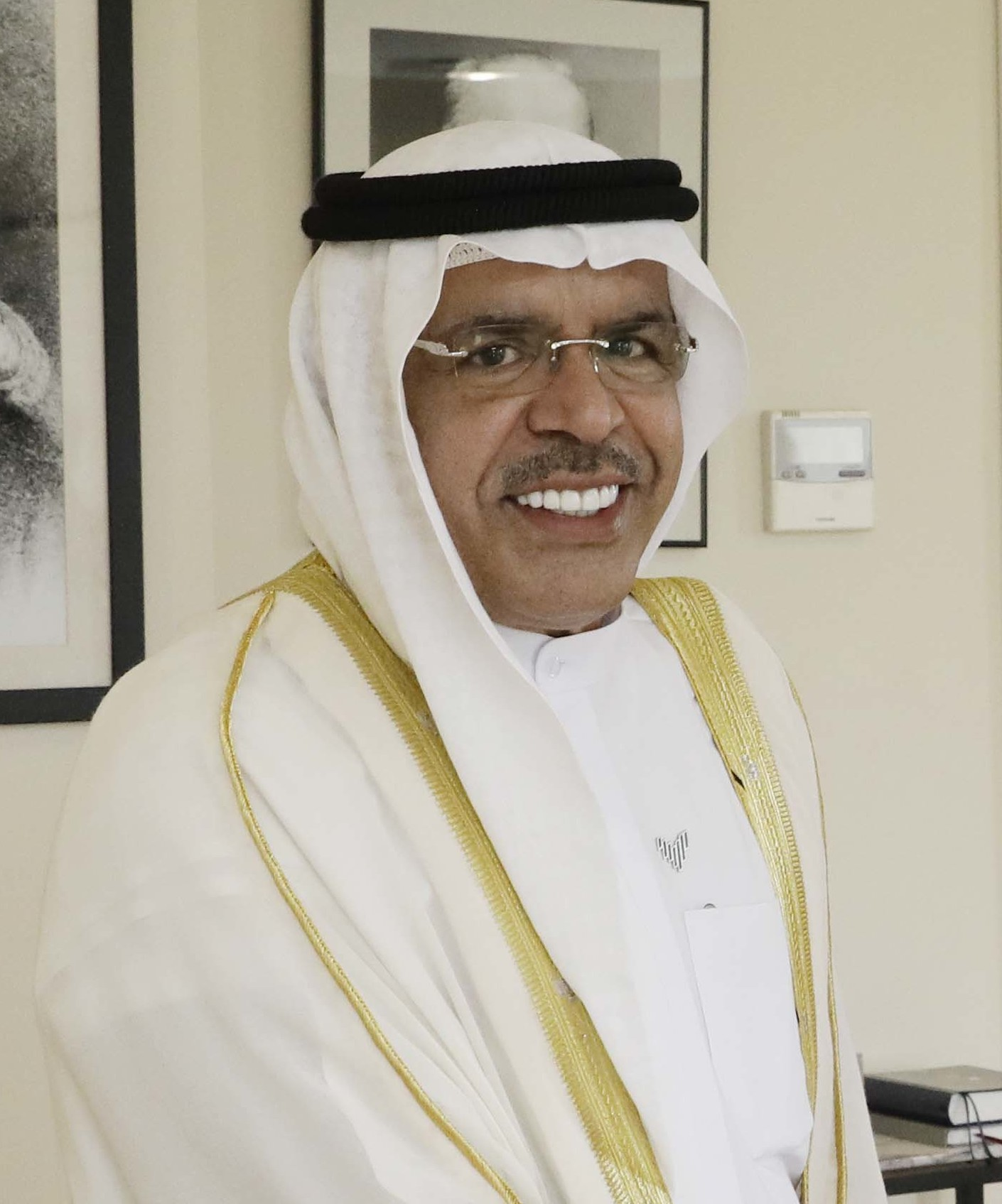
Portrait of Essa Abdulla Al Basha Al Noaimi

Essa Abdulla Al Basha Al Noaimi (Arabic: عيسى عبدالله الباشه النعيمي) is a retired senior career diplomat from the United Arab Emirates. Born in the emirate of Ras Al Khaimah in 1956, Al Noaimi graduated within the first cohort of United Arab Emirates University in 1981 where he obtained a BA degree in Geography. He later received an MA degree in International Relations. In addition to his native Arabic, he speaks English and Persian.

== Diplomatic career ==
Al Noaimi joined the diplomatic corps in 1981 and held the following positions:

- Ambassador to Georgia from 2018 to 2020.
- Ambassador to Pakistan from 2011 to 2017, accredited also as a non-resident ambassador to Mauritius.
- Director of African Affairs Department in the ministry's headquarters from 2009 to 2011.
- Ambassador to Sudan from 2002 to 2009. In April 2007, he received the deanship of diplomatic corps in Sudan. During his tenure in Sudan, he was also accredited as a non-resident ambassador to Uganda, Tanzania, and Chad.
- Consul-General in Bandar Abbas, Iran from 1995 to 2000.
- Chargé d'affaires in the United Arab Emirates embassy in China.
- Chargé d'affaires in the United Arab Emirates embassy in Bangladesh.
- Stationed in UAE embassies in Syria, Iran, India, and Pakistan.
- Counselor in the Political Affairs Department in the ministry's headquarters in Abu Dhabi.
- Participated as a UAE delegate to the United Nations.

== Awards and recognition ==
Al Noaimi received the First Class Order of the Two Niles at the end of his diplomatic tenure in Sudan from President Omar Al-Bashir in 2009.
