= Deepak Vohra =

Indian politician

Indian Ambassador to Armenia
- In office 29 August 2001 – 26 July 2005
- Preceded by: Bal Anand
- Succeeded by: Reena Pandey

Indian Ambassador to Sudan
- In office 26 July 2005 – 18 March 2010
- Preceded by: Ashok Kumar
- Succeeded by: Sanjay Kumar Verma

Indian Ambassador to Poland
- In office 18 March 2010 – November 2011
- Preceded by: Rajesh Yaishnaw
- Succeeded by: Monika Kapil Mohta

Personal details
- Born: 14 May 1951 (age 75) New Delhi
- Citizenship: Indian
- Spouse: Rekha Vohra
- Children: 2
- Parent: General Vohra
- Education: St. Stephen's College, Delhi; Delhi University; National Defence College, India; Sorbonne University
- Profession: Diplomat

Deepak Vohra is a retired Indian diplomat of the Indian Foreign Service who has served as an Indian Ambassador to Armenia, Poland and Sudan. He also served as the technology advisor to former Prime Minister of India PV Narasimha Rao.

== Education and early career ==
Vohra studied at St. Columba's School, Delhi. He then graduated from St. Stephen's College, Delhi. He pursued his studies at National Defence College (India) and at the University of Paris.

After joining the IFS, he was an Officer on Special Duty to the Technology Advisor to the then Prime Minister P. V. Narasimha Rao. Vohra has also previously worked with Sulabh International and has been a part of United Nations assignments in Africa.

== Indian Foreign Service ==
Vohra has served in France, Tunisia, United States, Russia, Chad, Cameroon, Papua New Guinea, Spain, Armenia, Sudan and Poland. In 1995 he was deputy high commissioner in Kuala Lumpur. He was Ambassador of India to Poland.

== Later career ==
In 2012 he was Advisor to the Government of South Sudan. He was a news reader at Doordarshan in start of his career as a TV news presenter. He inaugurated the Apati War Memorial at Kargil. In September 2025, a group of students slammed his speech at Lady Shriram College in Delhi (LSR) for his misogynistic and regressive comments and demanded his apology.

== Corruption and Other Allegations ==
Ambassador Vohra has been at the centre of graft and other allegations, including that of corruption. The CBI was given nod by the government in 2022 to look into graft allegations for his tenure in Sudan charges for which included submitting false TA bills, purchasing diesel at a higher rate than market; payment of agency charges for hiring office of the Indian Consulate to a fictitious person/agent, hiring of Consulate premises at a higher rate, hiring of private car despite availability of official car among others. He was also raided by ED for his involvement in Line of Credit fraud, where he functioned as intermediary for some Indian entities obtaining soft loans, under the allegation of paying kickbacks to politicians based in Africa.

== Awards ==
In 2013, Deepak Vohra was awarded the Order of the Two Niles (first class), Sudan's highest civilian honour by the President of Sudan.
