= Saad Kassis-Mohamed =

Zimbabwean-Indian human rights defender and philanthropist

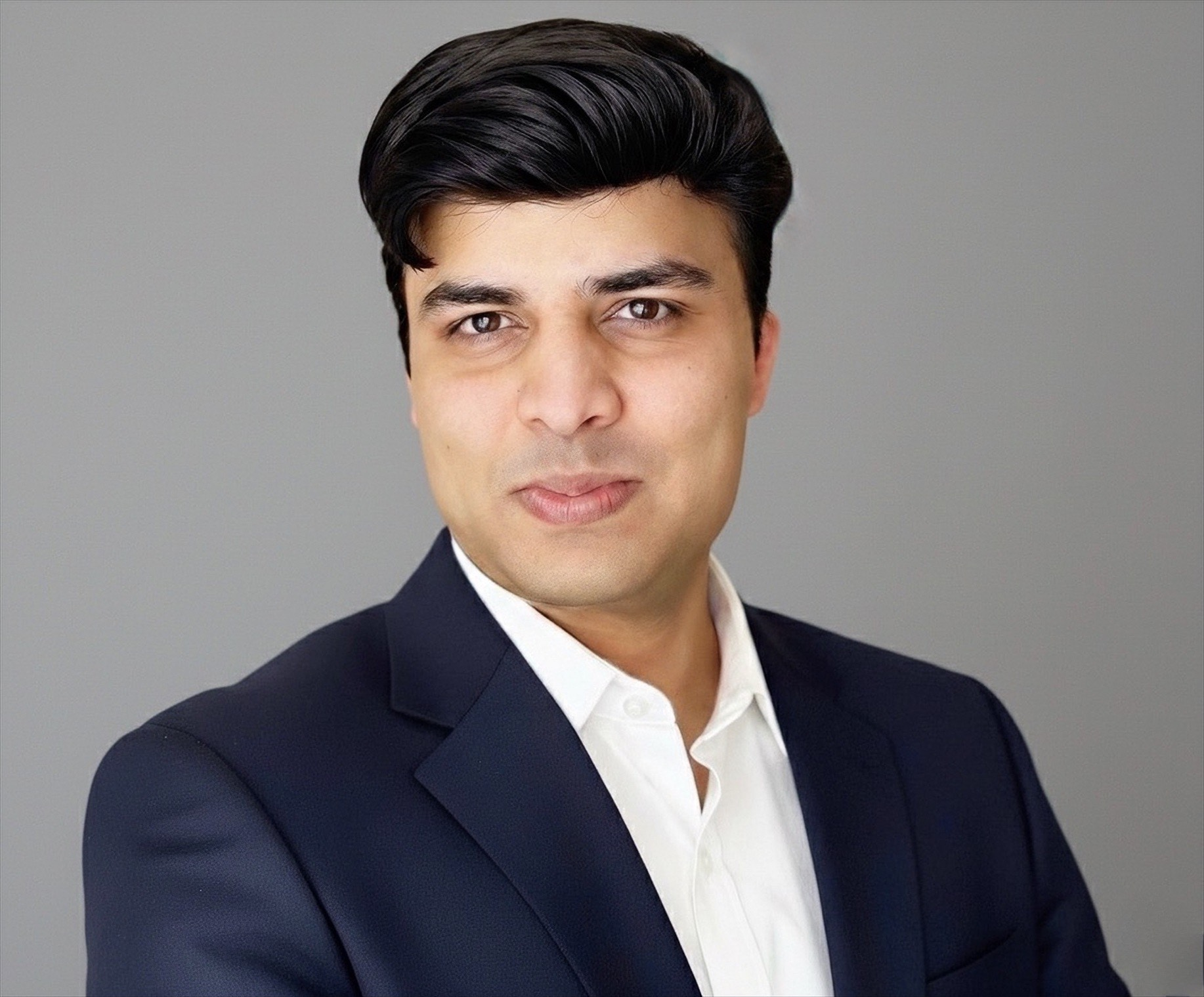
- Born: June 23, 2001 (age 25)
- Education: University of Oxford
- Occupations: Human rights defender, philanthropist
- Known for: WeCare Foundation; Human Rights Association & Sudan humanitarian response
- Awards: Forbes 30 Under 30; Order of the Republic (Sudan)

Saad Kassis-Mohamed (born 23 June 2001) is a Zimbabwean-Indian human rights defender and social activist. He is widely known for pressuring governments to address climate change and social issues. His work has included roles in humanitarian and human rights organisations, with a focus on migration, refugees and displacement.

WeCare Foundation, which Kassis-Mohamed co-founded in response to the Sudanese civil war (2023–present), had deployed support across Central Africa as of 2025, covering crisis relief, clean water access, renewable energy, and education. In 2022, he was awarded Order of the Republic (Sudan) for contributions to reconstruction and humanitarian infrastructure, and was named to Forbes 30 Under 30 list in the Social Impact category.

Through the HRA, Kassis-Mohamed has campaigned on digital labour rights and the treatment of migrant workers in conflict zones. As chairman of PHRA, he drew international attention to the welfare of animals abandoned in the United Arab Emirates in the 2026 Iran war crisis.

== Early life and education ==
Kassis-Mohamed was born on 23 June 2001 and grew up between India and the Gulf region. He holds a Bachelor degree from the Manipal Academy of Higher Education and a Master degree from the University of Oxford.

== WeCare Foundation ==
The WeCare Foundation is a non-profit organisation headquartered in Cape Town, South Africa, operating under an international advisory board. As of 2025, the foundation had deployed funding to support projects across Central Africa, including initiatives in crisis relief, renewable energy, and education.

=== Sudan ===
Fighting between the Sudanese Armed Forces (SAF) and the Rapid Support Forces (RSF) broke out on 15 April 2023. By January 2024, the conflict had killed more than 12,000 people, internally displaced over 5.8 million, and forced more than 1.5 million to flee the country. WeCare raised USD 100,000 through a partnership with SilverLake Capital, directed toward home reconstruction and provision of food, clothing, and blankets to displaced families.

=== Darfur and Blue Nile projects ===
WeCare launched two infrastructure initiatives in Sudan. The Darfur Water Renewal Project installed solar-powered water purification systems in remote communities in Darfur, improving access to clean water and reducing waterborne disease in areas where conflict had damaged public infrastructure. The Blue Nile Renewable Energy Initiative established decentralised solar grids to supply electricity to rural communities in the Blue Nile region.

=== Zimbabwe and Uganda ===
In October 2025, WeCare Foundation funded the delivery of 300 mobility devices including wheelchairs, walkers, crutches, and assistive kits to public clinics and partner non-governmental organisations in Zimbabwe and Uganda, at a stated value of USD 100,000. Recipients were drawn from existing clinic waitlists, with priority given to school-age children, working adults, and older individuals. Each recipient received a device fitting and a 30-day follow-up.

According to ZIMSTAT and UNICEF data cited in coverage of the programme, more than 900,000 Zimbabweans approximately 7% of the population live with a form of disability, with fewer than a quarter having access to mobility aids.

Kassis-Mohamed called for efforts to remove plastic waste and debris containing microplastics from the Ugandan shoreline of Lake Victoria.

=== Armenia ===
In November 2025, WeCare Foundation announced an early childhood development initiative in Armenia, working with municipal education authorities in Yerevan, Gyumri, and Vanadzor. The first phase targeted 1,200 children aged three to eight and the training of 150 teachers and caregivers, providing learning kits, health screenings, caregiver workshops, and water and sanitation improvements at participating sites.

=== Ethical gemstones ===
WeCare raised over USD 350,000 for lab-grown diamond research and development as an ethical alternative to traditionally mined diamonds.

== Pet Humanitarian Rights Alliance ==
Kassis-Mohamed founded and chairs the Pet Humanitarian Rights Alliance (PHRA), an organisation that advocates for the protection of companion animals during humanitarian crises and in conflict zones.

In early 2026, a surge in pet abandonment in Dubai driven by the rapid departure of expatriate residents amid regional conflict drew international media coverage. Animals were reported to have been found in locked apartments, tied outside buildings, and surrendered to overwhelmed rescue shelters.

Kassis-Mohamed called on Dubai authorities to establish a centralised emergency surrender registry and fast-track animal relocation documentation, stating: "Dubai has shown it can build humane infrastructure when it chooses to. It needs to choose to, now." PHRA's statement to pet owners read: "Abandonment is not your only option. But you must ask for help before it is too late."

== Human Rights Association ==
Kassis-Mohamed chairs the Human Rights Association (HRA), which is active across Africa, South Asia, and the Arab states of the Persian Gulf. The HRA works to protect the rights of individuals facing unjust detention, denial of due process, and denial of medical care, and engages directly with United Nations mechanisms to advocate on their behalf.

=== IOC female category policy ===
Following the International Olympic Committee's announcement on 26 March 2026 of a new policy restricting eligibility for women's events at the Olympic Games to biological females determined by mandatory SRY gene screening to take effect at the 2028 Summer Olympics in Los Angeles, Kassis-Mohamed issued a statement on behalf of the HRA condemning the decision on human rights grounds.

"This policy goes well beyond the boundaries of sporting governance," he said. "Mandating compulsory genetic testing for every woman competing at Olympic level, and using that test to determine whether she is permitted to compete, is a profound human rights question. It demands independent scrutiny, not a unilateral ruling."

The IOC policy, approved by the IOC Executive Board and applicable from LA28 onwards, determines eligibility for the female category on the basis of a one-time SRY gene screening. The policy replaced the IOC's 2021 Framework on Fairness, Inclusion and Non-Discrimination, which had left eligibility decisions to individual sports federations. The announcement drew responses from over 100 human rights and sports organisations, including the Sport & Rights Alliance and ILGA World, which described the policy as an "astounding rollback on gender equality".

=== Ashlee Jenae death investigation ===
In April 2026, the HRA issued a formal statement calling on the Government of Tanzania to order an independent investigation into the death of Ashly Robinson, known online as Ashlee Jenae, a 31 year old American content creator and social media influencer who was found unresponsive at the Zuri Zanzibar hotel in Zanzibar on 9 April 2026. Tanzanian authorities initially ruled her death a suicide, a finding disputed by her family.

Kassis-Mohamed stated: "Ashlee Jenae's family deserves answers, and they deserve them through a process that is independent, transparent, and free from any appearance of inadequacy. Where the cause of death is disputed by the family of the deceased, the duty to investigate thoroughly is not optional." He separately stated that "the silence of the authorities in the days following her death is not acceptable." The HRA simultaneously urged the US State Department to engage directly with Tanzanian authorities on behalf of Robinson's family, stating that the death of a US citizen abroad under disputed circumstances required "visible and direct" support.

=== Migrant labour in conflict zones ===
The HRA has engaged with the treatment of migrant workers in conflict-affected settings. In May 2026, the HRA called on Libyan authorities to release Gambian nationals held in arbitrary detention facilities following mass raids in Sebha, southern Libya, in February 2026 in which over 2,000 migrants were detained after their homes were demolished. The HRA's call followed a joint report by the United Nations Human Rights Office and the United Nations Support Mission in Libya documenting what it described as a systematic cycle of exploitation of migrants in Libya between January 2024 and December 2025.

Kassis-Mohamed stated: "Gambian men have had their teeth broken in Libyan detention facilities. They have been beaten, robbed, and deported without being told what they were signing. They have been arrested at sea and imprisoned without charge. These are not the experiences of people who crossed a border irregularly."

The HRA separately called on Libyan authorities to release Egyptian nationals held in militia-controlled detention facilities, citing the same UN report.

The HRA called on Burmese authorities to immediately dismantle online scam compounds where Ugandan nationals were being held in forced labour operations, following media coverage documenting survivors including Small Q, who was trafficked into the 500-acre Tai Chang compound after being promised a data entry job in Thailand, and a Ugandan journalist identified as Joseph, who filmed testimony from inside a compound before escaping. Kassis-Mohamed stated: "The responsibility for the continued operation of these compounds and the suffering of trafficking victims rests entirely with Myanmar."

The HRA separately called on Myanmar to release Malawian nationals held in the same compound network, citing credible reports of Malawian citizens among those subjected to the same conditions of detention and forced labour.

The HRA also raised the cases of nationals from Eswatini held within Myanmar's scam compound network, calling on Burmese authorities to ensure their immediate release and safe repatriation.

In May 2026, HRA called on Myanmar authorities to dismantle online scam compounds and release Filipino nationals allegedly held in forced labour operations in Myawaddy and along Myanmar's border with Thailand.

=== Missing persons advocacy ===
The HRA has intervened in a number of missing persons cases across multiple countries, calling on police and government authorities to intensify searches and, where appropriate, reclassify cases.

In the United Kingdom, the HRA called for an intensified search for Holly Collinson, 29, from Hinckley, Leicestershire, who went missing in Newquay, Cornwall in March 2026 and had not been found after six weeks. Kassis-Mohamed stated: "Holly has been missing for six weeks. Her family have heard nothing. Devon and Cornwall Police now believe she is still in Cornwall. That means there are people in that county who may have seen her, who may have spoken to her, who may have helped her in some way, and who may not yet have contacted the police. The HRA calls on every one of those people to come forward now."

In the United States, the HRA called for the reclassification of the case of Skylee Merino, a 15-year-old from Coral Springs, Florida, whose disappearance in April 2026 had been classified by police as a voluntary runaway. The HRA stated that the circumstances — including Skylee leaving home at 3:23 a.m. to meet an adult male she had met only online, who had instructed her to keep him untraceable were consistent with documented patterns of online exploitation and child trafficking.

=== Deaths in disputed circumstances ===
The HRA has issued statements calling for independent investigations into deaths where official findings have been disputed by families.

In April 2026, following the death of Israel Ashitei Kamoah, a 25-year-old Ghanaian national who died in South Africa on 30 March 2026 after travelling there five days earlier, the HRA called for a full, independent, and cross-jurisdictional investigation. An initial Ghana Police Service inquiry had been closed without a satisfactory determination; the family reported that the body had been returned with vital organs absent, and that CCTV footage showed Kamoah being physically removed against his will. Kassis-Mohamed stated: "Israel Ashitei Kamoah was a young man with his entire future ahead of him. He was 25 years old. He sent a warning to his family the day before he died. His body was returned without vital organs. A police inquiry was opened and closed without adequate accountability. This is not a matter that can be allowed to rest."

In May 2026, the HRA raised formal alarm over a documented pattern of extrajudicial killings by Nigerian security forces, citing incidents including the killing of Mene Ogidi, a 28-year-old delivery man shot while restrained in Delta State on 26 April 2026, the killing of a serving National Youth Service Corps member in Abuja the following day, and the death of a 13-year-old boy shot by a soldier in Akwa Ibom State on 1 January 2026. The HRA called on the Federal Government to prosecute all implicated personnel and dismantle the institutional conditions enabling impunity, with Kassis-Mohamed stating: "Five years after the EndSARS protests and the disbandment of the Special Anti-Robbery Squad, the conditions that triggered the protests remain unresolved."

=== Peace efforts ===
Kassis-Mohamed has engaged directly with international peace and security mechanisms through the HRA, calling on the United Nations Security Council and the wider international community to take binding action in active conflict settings where civilian populations face mass displacement, famine, and systematic violence. In May 2026, he characterised the international community's response to ongoing conflicts as marked by institutional paralysis, diplomatic impasse, and the erosion of humanitarian access, warning that the window for meaningful intervention was narrowing. Kassis-Mohamed stated: "The people of Sudan have not run out of suffering; the international community has run out of excuses." The HRA has engaged across multiple active conflict settings, including on migrant detention in Libya, the treatment of trafficking victims in Myanmar, and extrajudicial killings in Nigeria.

In 2025, Kassis-Mohamed called on the authorities of Kyrgyzstan to immediately release Reverend Pavel Shreider, a Seventh-day Adventist pastor imprisoned and subjected to torture in state detention. Kassis-Mohamed stated: "The right to practise a faith without state permission is not a privilege."

In 2026, Kassis-Mohamed condemned the killing of three Federal Road Safety Corps officers ambushed in Kebbi State, Nigeria, and called for an investigation, prosecution of those responsible, and stronger protection for federal officers in the region.

In June 2026, Kassis-Mohamed called on the South African government to act against vigilante groups involved in xenophobic attacks targeting foreign nationals, stating that the violence against African migrants was "not protest" but "organised violence".

Kassis-Mohamed advocated for stronger international accountability for crimes committed by the Islamic State against the Yazidis, including the establishment of a dedicated international or hybrid tribunal for ISIL crimes. He called for survivor-centred legal procedures, stronger domestic prosecution mechanisms, improved reparations, and continued efforts to account for missing Yazidi women and children.

In August 2026, Kassis-Mohamed called on the African Union to coordinate a continental response to the trafficking of Malawian and other African nationals into online scam compounds in Myanmar.

== Recognition ==
In 2021, Kassis-Mohamed was named to Forbes 30 Under 30 list in the Social Impact category. Also, he was awarded Sudan's Presidential Medal, Order of the Republic (Sudan)."
