= Józef Gazy =

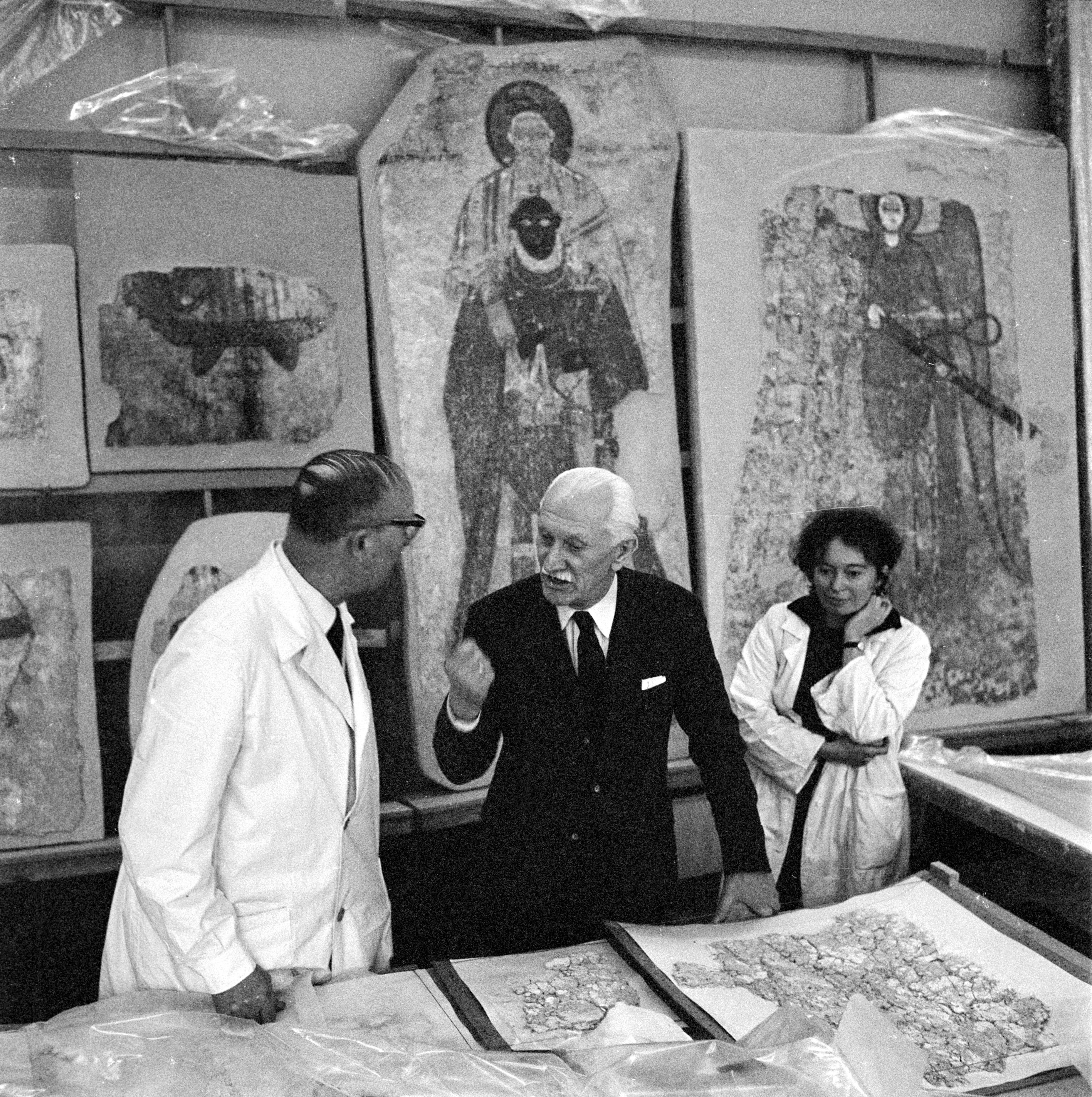
Józef Gazy, professor Kazimierz Michałowski and Barbara Lewandowska in a conservation laboratory of the National Museum in Warsaw. Frescoes from the Faras Cathedral in the background.

Józef Gazy (1910–1998) was a Polish artist, sculptor and restorer. Author of several monuments set in public space in various cities in Poland. In the 1960s he served as the leader of a team responsible for removal, maintenance, conservation and restoration of frescoes from the cathedral of Faras.

== Biography ==
Józef Gazy was born in 1910. In 1937, he graduated from Warsaw Academy of Fine Arts.

In 1945 he joined the Office for the Reconstruction of the Capital (BOS). As part of his work there he was one of the creators of Warsaw's Monument to Brotherhood in Arms; he was also the sculptor to re-create the missing elements of the Sigismund's Column destroyed by the Germans during World War II. In the 1940s he was also one of the sculptors responsible for the decoration of the buildings of Marszałkowska Residential District in Warsaw. In 1951 he authored the Monument of Polish-Soviet Brotherhood of Arms in Legnica; during Stalinist period he created four additional monuments, similar to the one in Legnica, for various cities in Poland.

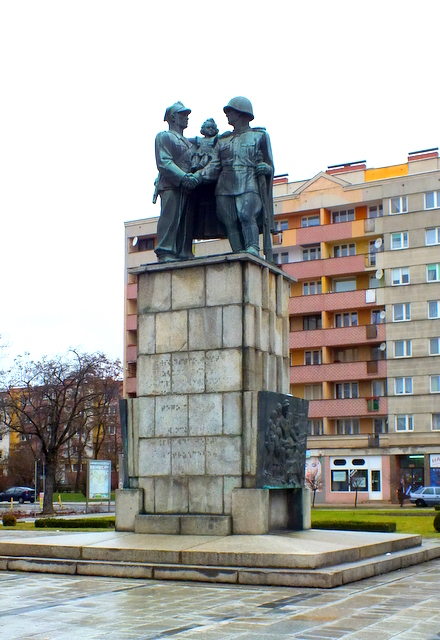
Socialist-realist Polish-Soviet Brotherhood in Arms Monument in Legnica is one of the best-known sculptures by Józef Gazy

In 1962 Józef Gazy became a member of the Polish archaeological expedition of the Polish Centre of Mediterranean Archaeology University of Warsaw conducting the excavations at Faras. He led the field team of art restorers which dealt with securing frescoes discovered in the cathedral of Faras, preserving them, removing them from the walls and preparing them for transport. A big part of the work on the site he carried out personally, aided by Marta Kubiak. He remained part of the team until the very end of excavations, and left it only with the last group of Polish archaeologists, together with professor Michałowski, Stefan Jakobielski, Tadeusz Dzierżykray-Rogalski, Marek Marciniak, Antoni Ostrasz and photographer of the expedition, Andrzej Dziewanowski, soon before the Faras site was flooded by the waters of newly-constructed Lake Nasser. His skills and ingenuity allowed for more than 120 frescoes to be rescued from the site. While working in Egypt, Gazy also helped William Y. Adams with maintenance and restoration of frescoes at the nearby archaeological site of Meinarti.

Between 1966 and 1969 Gazy continued his work on maintenance and restoration of paintings in the National Museum in Khartoum, where he was responsible for preparing the first permanent exhibition of Nubian painting, scheduled for 1972. Upon his return to Poland, he joined the team of restorers preparing the exhibition of the Polish part of the Faras collection, led by Hanna Jędrzejewska. The Faras Gallery was opened to the public in 1974. For his work on saving the Nubian art Józef Gazy received, among other decorations, the Sudanese Order of Merit.

In mid-1970s Józef Gazy returned to his sculpting career, interrupted more than a decade before. He remained in contact with the Polish Centre of Mediterranean Archaeology as its expert and conservator. Among other projects, he supervised the restoration of sculptures of a lion and antelope found by Polish archaeologists in the temple of Al-Lat in Palmyra.

In 1988 a monument of Pope John Paul II of his authorship was unveiled in front of the Zamość Cathedral; it was one of the first monuments to John Paul II in the world.

Józef Gazy died in 1998.

== Sources ==
=== Bibliography ===
- Baumgartner, Gabriele, ed. (1998), Polski indeks biograficzny (in Polish, German, and English), München: Saur, ISBN 3598345062, OCLC 75935502
- Dzierżykray-Rogalski, Tadeusz (1982), "W dwudziestolecie polskiego sukcesu w Faras: dziennik terenowy uczestnika polskiej ekspedycji", Kwartalnik Historii Nauki I Techniki (in Polish), 2 (27), Państwowe Wydawn. Naukowe.: 249–290
- Giergoń, Paweł (2004), "Pomnik Braterstwa Broni - sztuka.net", www.sztuka.net, archived from the original on 2016-03-04
- Godlewski, Włodzimierz (1998), "Obituary: Józef Gazy (1910-1998)", Polish Archaeology in the Mediterranean (Research 1998), X, Iwona Zych, Warszawa: Polish Centre of Mediterranean Archaeology University of Warsaw: 9–10, ISSN 1234-5415
- Górski, Jan (1988), Warszawa w latach 1944-1949: odbudowa (in Polish), Państwowe Wydawn. Nauk., ISBN 9788301033224
- Jędrzejewska, Hanna (1965), "Konserwacja dwóch malowideł ściennych z Faras", Rocznik Muzeum Narodowego W Warszawie (9), Warszawa: Muzeum Narodowe w Warszawie: 217–258
- Jakobielski, Stefan (2002), "Die Rettung der Wandgälde von Faras", in Wilfried Seipel (ed.), Faras die Katedrale aus dem Wüstensand (in German), Wien: Kunsthistorisches Museum Wien, pp. 51–56
- Jaworska, Janina (1993), Michał Jagosz (ed.), "Jan Paweł II sztuce polskiej", Materiały XV sesji Stałej Konferencji Archiwów, Bibliotek i Muzeów Polskich na Zachodzie, 23-26. 9. 1993 (in Polish), Rzym: Fundacja Jana Pawła II, Ośrodek Dokumentacji Pontyfikatu
- Łukasiewicz, Maciej (1976), Co nowego w starożytności? (in Polish), Iskry
- Olszewski, Andrzej K. (1988), Dzieje sztuki polskiej 1890-1980 w zarysie (in Polish), Interpress, ISBN 9788322321249
- Sygietyńska, Hanna (1978), Kamień w architekturze i rzeźbie Warszawy, Warszawa: Państwowe Wydawnictwo Naukowe
