= Order of the Republic (Sudan) =

State decoration of Sudan for foreigners

Order of the Republic وسام الجمهورية
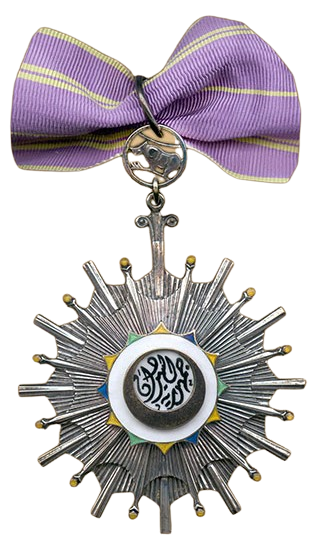
- Governor General issue of the Order

Awarded by Sudan
- Type: Order of Merit
- Established: 16 November 1961; 64 years ago
- Country: Sudan
- Awarded for: Providing great services to the state
- Status: Currently constituted
- Classes: Grand Cordon (Class I); Grand Officer (Class II); Commander (Class III); Officer (Class IV); Knight (Class V)

Precedence
- Next (lower): Order of the Two Niles
- Ribbon bar of the order

The Order of the Republic (Arabic: وسام الجمهورية, romanized: wisām al-jumhūriyya) is a state decoration of Sudan established on 16 November 1961 and given to Sudanese and foreigners who rendered outstanding contributions to the government. The order is the highest Sudanese honour. The order has two issues: the Governor General issue with the Rhinoceros suspension, and the Democratic Republic of Sudan's issue with the emblem of the Republic (Secretarybird) suspension.

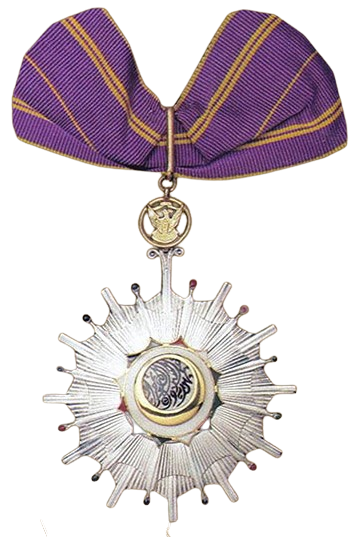
Democratic Republic of Sudan issue of the Order

It is not permissible to repeat awarding of decorations and medals, or to rise from one class to a higher one, except after the lapse of at least three years from the date of awarding them. This period is reduced to one year for employees if they are referred to retirement. Orders and medals remain the property of the awardee, and their heirs as a souvenir without any of them having the right to carry it. Without prejudice to any other punishment stipulated in the laws of Sudan, it is permissible, by order of the President of the Republic, to strip the bearer of a necklace, sash, medal, medallion, cloak of honour, or belt if they commit an act that is dishonourable or inconsistent with loyalty to the state.

== Classes ==
=== Class I ===
It consists of a silk ribbon of corrugated violet colour, divided longitudinally by seven light green stripes, and ends with a medal consisting of three tandem surfaces, the first of which is white enamel with the inscription "Democratic Republic of Sudan" in dark blue and surrounded by the colours of the flag of the Democratic Republic of Sudan on the second surface. The medal hangs from a golden circle in the middle, which is a drawing of the emblem of the Democratic Republic of Sudan circling the scarf from right to left. The sash is followed by a large medal medallion carried on the chest on the left side.

=== Class II ===
The Class II and III are made of platinum metal, in addition to yellow enamel motifs at the edges of the second surface. It consists of a necklace made of silk cloth, the same colour as the scarf. It is worn around the neck, and a medallion similar to the medallion of Class I hangs from it, followed by a medallion worn on the chest on the left side, similar to the medallion of the scarf.

=== Class III ===
It consists of a necklace of silk fabric similar to the necklace of the Class II, worn around the neck, and a medal similar to the medal of the second class hanging from it.

=== Class IV ===
It consists of a medal worn on the chest on the left side. The medal hangs from a golden circle in the middle, which is a drawing of the emblem of the Democratic Republic of Sudan, the Secretarybird. This circle is attached to an undulating silk ribbon of the same colour as the ribbon of the Class III Medal. Class IV consists of surfaces, the first of which is white enamel with the inscription "Democratic Republic of Sudan" in dark blue and surrounded by the colours of the flag of the Democratic Republic of Sudan. The second is made of platinum metal, the edges of which are decorated with small circles of yellow enamel.

=== Class V ===
It consists of a medal worn on the chest from the left side. The medal hangs from a golden circle in the middle which is a drawing of the emblem of the Democratic Republic of Sudan, the Secretarybird. This circle is clasped on a wavy silk ribbon of the same colour as the ribbon of Class IV. The decoration consists of two synonymous surfaces only, the first of the white enamel on which is written "the Democratic Republic of Sudan" in dark blue and surrounded by the colours of the flag of the Democratic Republic of Sudan, and the second of platinum metal. It differs from the Class IV in that its edges are not decorated with circles of yellow enamel.

== Notable recipients ==
- 1970 Haile Selassie
- 1975 Andrew W. Riang Wieu
- 1979 Ismail al-Haj Mousa
- 2013 Ahmad bin Abdullah Al Mahmoud
- 2013 Gamal Al-Wali
- 2014 Sadiq al-Mahdi
- 2014 Mohamed Osman al-Mirghani
- 2017 Zhang Gaoli
- 2018 Riek Machar
- 2018 Yevgeny Prigozhin
- 2021 Chris Coons
- Amin Abusineina
- Abdelrahim Mahmoud Ahmed, former Central Region Governor
- Peter Gatkuoth Gual
- Izzeddin Hamid
- Kamil Mohamad Said
- Mohamad Sayid al-Shaar
- Ahmad Abdulhaum
- Saad Kassis-Mohamed
- Omer Yousif Birido
- Sayed Abdallahi El Hassan
