= Collar of Honour =

Sudanese Order

Collar of Honour قلادة الشرف
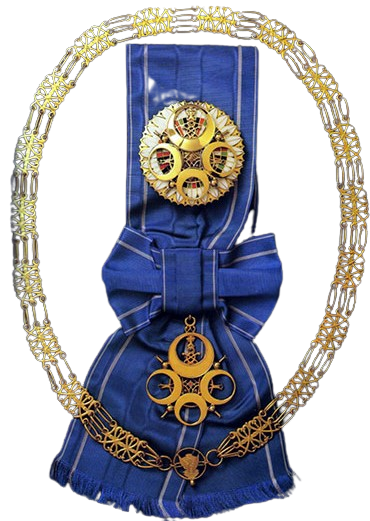

Awarded by Sudan
- Type: Presidential sash
- Established: 1956; 70 years ago
- Country: Sudan
- Eligibility: Head of state
- Awarded for: Providing great services to the state
- Status: Currently constituted
- Sudan Head of state

Precedence
- Next (lower): Sash of Honour
- Ribbon bar of the Collar

The Collar of Honour (Arabic: قلادة الشرف, romanized: qilāda aš-šarufa) is a state decoration of Sudan established in 1956 after Sudan independence. The collar is awarded to the Head of state of Sudan and foreign countries.

It is not permissible to repeat awarding of decorations and medals, or to rise from one class to a higher one, except after the lapse of at least three years from the date of awarding them. This period is reduced to one year for employees if they are referred to retirement. Orders and medals remain the property of the awardee, and their heirs as a souvenir without any of them having the right to carry it. Without prejudice to any other punishment stipulated in the laws of Sudan, it is permissible, by order of the President of the Republic, to strip the bearer of a necklace, sash, medal, medallion, cloak of honour, or belt if they commit an act that is dishonourable or inconsistent with loyalty to the state.

== Insignia ==
The collar is a chain of gold with two branches of decorative units in an Islamic style, and each unit is connected to the other with an oval ring. The length of the chain is 36 inches, in the middle of which is a drawing of the emblem of the Democratic Republic of Sudan (Secretarybird). The collar has a gold ornament that connects to the chain with a clasp – and the ornament is of an Islamic style adorned with three green gemstones with a red sapphire in the middle – and in its centre is a prominent drawing of four crescents that symbolise religion, goodness, prosperity and happiness. It is worn around the neck and is accompanied by a large medal (medallion) carried on the chest on the left side. The medallion consists of two surfaces; the lower one is a sun in which there are successive oval shapes of white enamel, in the middle of which is a geometric decoration of enamel in the colours of the flag of the Democratic Republic of Sudan. The upper one is composed of the same ornamental shape connected to the chain. In the case of the military, the necklace follows a light blue colour of wavy silk, with two white lines and two thin lines.

== Notable recipients ==
- 1958 Hassan II of Morocco
- 1959 Josip Broz Tito
- 1964 Elizabeth II
- 1964 Prince Philip, Duke of Edinburgh
- 1974 Mohammad Reza Pahlavi
- 1991 Azlan Shah
- 2014 Tamim bin Hamad Al Thani
- 2017 Recep Tayyip Erdoğan
- 2018 Salva Kiir
- Hosni Mubarak
- Faisal of Saudi Arabia
