= Order of Excellence for Women =

State decoration of Sudan

Order of Excellence for Women وسام الامتياز
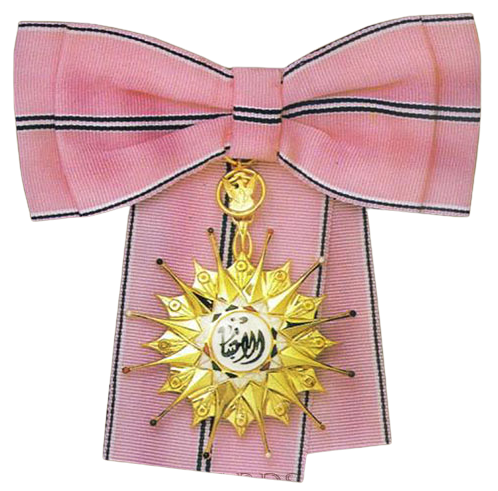
- Class I of the Order

Awarded by Sudan
- Type: Order of Merit
- Established: 16 November 1961; 63 years ago
- Country: Sudan
- Eligibility: Need to be a woman
- Awarded for: Performing excellent services to the state or humanity (women)
- Status: Currently constituted
- Founder: Ibrahim Abboud
- Classes: Class I Class II; Class III

Precedence
- Next (higher): Order of the Two Niles
- Next (lower): Star of Civil Accomplishment
- Equivalent: Order of Righteous Son of Sudan and Order of Merit
- Ribbon bar of the order

The Order of Excellence for Women (Arabic: وسام الامتياز, romanized: wisām al-imtiyāz) or Order of Distinction for Women is a state decoration of Sudan established on 16 November 1961 during Ibrahim Abboud's military government. It is awarded to Sudanese and foreign women who perform excellent services to the state or humanity.

== Background ==
The Order of Excellence for Women was established on 16 November 1961 by Ibrahim Abboud. It is awarded to Sudanese and foreign women who perform excellent services to the state or humanity.

According to Sudanese law of 1961, the order is only given to women and cannot be awarded more than once unless after three years. This period is reduced to one year for employees if they are referred to retirement. Similar to other orders and medals, it remains the property of the awardee, and their heirs as a souvenir but the heirs don't have the right to carry it. The order can be withdrawn by the head of state when a dishonourable act is committed by the awardee.

== Insignia ==
Name	Image	Notes
Class I		It consists of a silk scarf, wavy, light in colour with two green and pink on the edges and pink in the middle, of which two green lines separate three white stripes. The scarf ends with a medal consisting of three tandem surfaces. The first of the white port reads the word Excellence (Arabic: الامتياز) in black, surrounded by a star with twelve divisions in the colours of the flag of the republic. The second and third surfaces are gold-plated copper metal, in addition to decorations from the yellow port on the edges of the second surface and from the green port on the edges of the third surface. The medal hangs from a golden circle in the middle of which is drawn the logo of the Democratic Republic of Sudan (Secretarybird or Rhinoceros). The medal is waggled from right to left, and the medal is followed by a large medal (a stud) bearing on the chest from the left.
Class II		It consists of a decoration of three monolithic surfaces, the first of the white port with the word Excellence written in black and surrounded by a star with twelve divisions in the colours of the flag of the Republic. The second and third surfaces of gold-plated copper metal as well as decorations from the yellow dial on the edges of the second surface. The medal hangs from a golden circle in the middle of which the emblem of the Democratic Republic of Sudan (Secretarybird or Rhinoceros) is drawn. The ribbon of this Class is similar to the scarf of Class II and wears the medal and the medal that follows it on the chest on the left.
Class III		It consists of a medal of three monolithic surfaces, the first of the white port, with the word Excellence written on it in black and surrounded by a star with twelve divisions in the colours of the flag of the Republic. The second and third surfaces of gold-plated copper metal. The medal hangs from a golden circle in the middle of which the logo of the Democratic Republic of Sudan. The ribbon of this Class is similar to that of Class II, and the medal is worn on the chest from the left.

== Notable recipients ==
- 2010 Egbal Jaafar
- 2010 Layla Musa Ali
- 2010 Sayda Al-Hajj Mohamed Bashir
- 2010 Layla Al-Toum Abdul-Raziq
- 2010 Fatima Abdallah Tairab
- 2010 Layla Khalid Hashi
- 2013 Griselda El Tayib
- 2014 Al-Srera Makki
- 2014 Nawal Al-Humoud Al-Malek Al-Sabah
- 2015 Hania Morsi Fadl
- 2015 Zubaida Adam Musa Ibrahim
- 2017 Aisha Abdulhadi
- 2017 Awadiya Samak
- 2020 Nafisa Mohamed Mahmoud
- 2022 Fatima bint Mubarak Al Ketbi
