= Khalil Osman =

Sudanese businessman

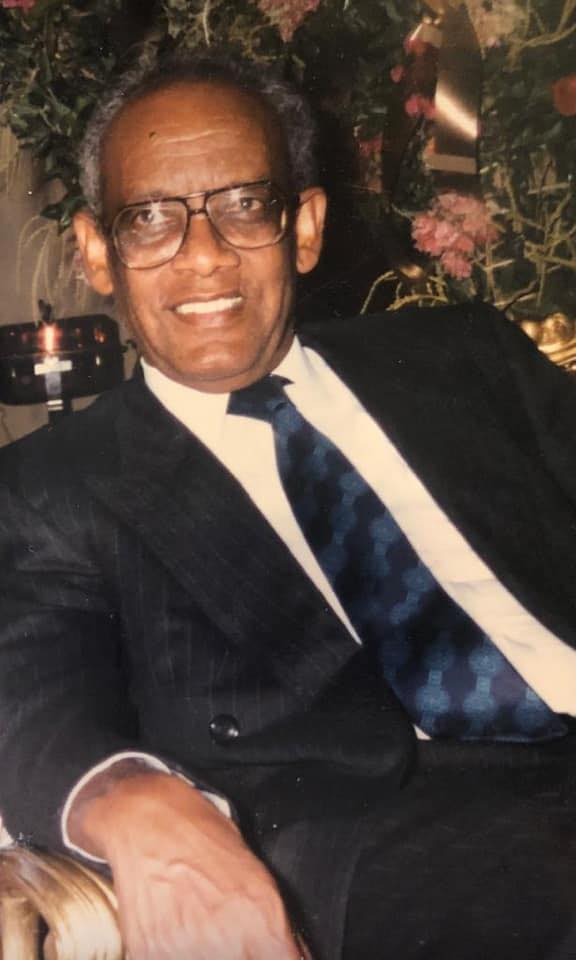
Khalil Osman Mahmoud in 1992

Khalil Osman Mahmoud (Arabic: خليل عثمان محمود) was a Sudanese businessman and entrepreneur who played a significant role in the country's industrial and economic development.

== Career ==
Khalil Osman Mahmoud was born and raised in El-Dueim, White Nile state. He was trained as a veterinary doctor, but Khalil ventured into business in 1968 starting in Kuwait with a company that specialized in fishing shrimp fishing. The company became one of the largest shrimp fishing business in the Persian Gulf region.

Throughout his career, Khalil diversified his investments and successfully established various businesses across the globe. Some of his notable ventures included investing in Canada in the timber and lumber industry, Somalia's fisheries, Holland's dairy products, and building match factories in Nigeria and Congo-Kinshasa. He is considered a pioneer of Sudanese entrepreneurship and is credited with establishing approximately 60% of Sudan's modern industrial sector.

Khalil was the first Sudanese businessman to initiate large-scale modern production in various sectors, such as particle board production, pharmaceuticals, textiles, and glass manufacturing through Gulf International company. He played a vital role in promoting Sudan's economic growth as an economic Presidential Advisor and was key in securing funding for major projects like the Kenana Sugar Company, one of the world's largest sugar plants and a significant source of revenue for Sudan's economy.

Khalil's investments in Sudan were extensive, and he founded numerous companies in various industries, including match production and distribution, glass manufacturing, agricultural organizations, packaging, chemical industries, and more. His business principles and strategies were focused on combining international technical expertise to utilise African resources through Arab capital resulting in a highly successful and diverse business empire.

Beyond his business success, Khalil's contributed to the development of education, healthcare, and job opportunities for thousands of people in Sudan and beyond. He built schools and hospitals, employed thousands in his factories and companies, and supported people in need through various philanthropic initiatives.

In 1971, a dispute occurred within the military establishment that turned into a new military rebellion, carried out by a group of officers declaring their intention to fight "new colonialism" and to end dependence on the West, of which they accused the Jaafar Nimeiry regime. However, the rebellion lasted only 3 days, after which international and regional powers intervened, led by Egypt and Libya with a British partnership, along with internal support for this intervention led by a Khalil Othman, which helped eliminate the rebellion in short time. Power was restored to Nimeiri.

Nimeiry stripped Khalil Osman form his Order of the Righteous Son of Sudan before imprisoning him with Mahmoud Mohammed Taha in 1982.
