= Order of the Righteous Son of Sudan =

Sudanese state decoration

Order of the Righteous Son of Sudan وسام إبن السودان البار
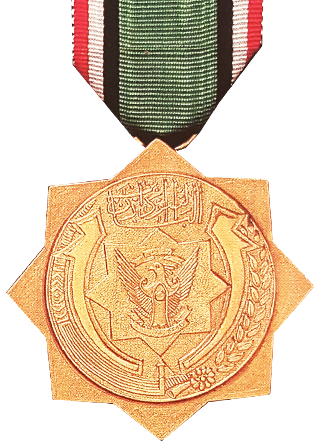

Awarded by Sudan
- Type: Order of Merit
- Established: 16 November 1961; 64 years ago
- Country: Sudan
- Eligibility: Male Sudan citizens
- Awarded for: Protecting the Republic's interests
- Status: Currently constituted

Precedence
- Next (higher): Order of the Two Niles
- Next (lower): Star of Civil Accomplishment
- Equivalent: Order of Excellence for Women and Order of Merit
- Ribbon bar of the order

The Order of the Righteous Son of Sudan (Arabic: وسام إبن السودان البار, romanized: wisām ibn as-Sūdān al-bārr) or Order of the Loyal Son of Sudan (Note: Or “The Sudan” which is the constitutional name of the republic) is a state decoration of Sudan established on 16 November 1961 by Ibrahim Abboud and given to male Sudan citizens who protected the state's interests.

The Order can be granted more than once but after three years. This period is reduced to one year for employees if they are referred to retirement. Similar to other orders and medals, it remains the property of the awardee, and their heirs as a souvenir but the heirs don’t have the right to carry it. The order can be withdrawn by the head of state when a dishonourable act is committed by the awardee.

== Privileges ==
According to Sudanese law of 1961, the holder of this medal shall have the following privileges:

- Be invited to attend national celebrations.
- Meet the President of the Republic, their deputies and the ministers.
- If necessary, the competent authorities shall facilitate his medical treatment inside and outside Sudan.
- It is not permissible to arrest or arrest him in cases other than flagrante delicto, except with the permission of the President of the Republic.

== Insignia ==
The Order consists of a medal of silver plated with gold water and three identical surfaces. The first is an eight-pointed star bearing the emblem of the Democratic Republic of Sudan. The second is a circle with a diameter of 40 millimetres (1.6 in) in the middle of the first surface, and on its outskirts is a sword and a bough. The olive tree, the flag of the Republic, and the phrase "the Righteous Son of Sudan" (Arabic: وسام إبن السودان البار). The third is a star with eight-pointed sloping sides. The decoration hangs from a ribbon of shiny, corrugated silk of green colour, its width is 17 millimetres (0.67 in), and it has two margins on the sides of the colours black, white, and red, respectively, each width is 2.5 millimetres (0.098 in), and it is worn on the chest on the left side.

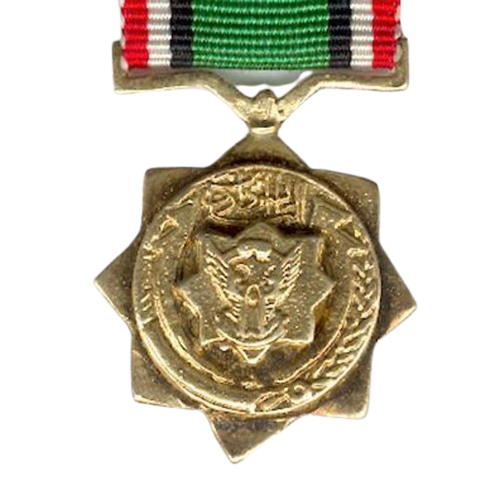
Miniature of the Order

A miniature medal of silver accompanies this medal with gold water. It bears the same specifications as the larger medal, reduced to one-third in dimensions, except for the ribbon, which is reduced to half and worn over the military's diaries.

== Notable recipients ==
- 1999 Anis Haggar
- 2017 Ahmed Abdel-Rahman
- 2019 Ahmed Haroun
- 2019 Abdel Rahman Swar al-Dahab
- Abdel Halim Mohamed
- Mustafa Al-Amin
- Ashrf Seed Ahmed
- Khalil Othman, but the Order was taken away by President Jaafar Nimeiry
- Siddig "Wada" Adam Abdallah
- Al-Dhau Hajouj
- Awad al-Jaz
- Kamal Abusen
- Abdullah Saeed Bawareth and Abdul Rahman Bawarath, who are Saudis that were given the Sudanese citizenship just before being honoured
