= Abdul Rahman Al-Sumait =

Kuwaiti Muslim scholar

Abd Al - Rahman Al-Sumait عبد الرحمن السميط
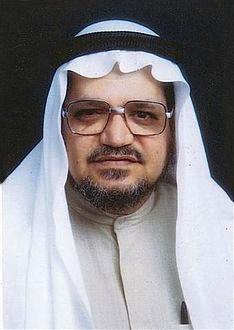
- Born: 15 October 1947; Kuwait
- Died: 15 August 2013 (aged 65); Kuwait
- Education: Specialization in Internal medicine and Digestive Diseases; University of Baghdad, Liverpool University, McGill University
- Occupations: Physician, Da'i
- Organization: King's College Hospital
- Known for: Philanthropic Efforts
- Awards: King Faisal International Prize
- Website: [Direct-Aid.org]

Dr. Abd Al-Rahman bin Hamood Al-Sumait (Arabic: عبد الرحمن السميط, abd al-Rahman al-samet; 15 October 1947 – 15 August 2013) was an Islamic scholar, medical practitioner and humanitarian from Kuwait. He was known for his philanthropic works in more than 29 African countries.

== Education ==
Born and raised in Kuwait, Al-Sumait was a doctor specializing in internal medicine and gastroenterology before becoming involved in charity work. He graduated from the University of Baghdad with a BS in Medicine and Surgery and, a diploma in Tropical Diseases from the University of Liverpool in 1974. He completed his postgraduate from McGill University in Canada, specializing in internal medicine and digestive systems.

== Career ==
Al-Sumait practiced medicine at Montreal Public Hospital from 1974 to 1978.

Abdul Rahman Al Sumait was the founder of the Africa Muslims Agency (new name, Direct Aid), and worked as its secretary-general from 1987 until he died in 2013. He was also the founder of Kuwait Relief Agency and worked as its CEO from 1987 to 2013 and coordinator of Health Attaché for the Kuwait Embassy in Kenya. Following is a list of charity and welfare institutions founded by Al-Sumait:

- Founding member of the Montreal branch of the Muslim Students Society, 1974-1976.
- Founding member, Malawi Muslims Committee – Kuwait 1980
- Founding member, Kuwaiti Relief Committee
- Founding member, International Islamic Charity Authority – Kuwait
- Founding member, International Islamic council for Call and Relief – Kuwait
- Member of Charity Rescue Society – Kuwait
- General Secretary of the African Muslims Committee, 1981 – 1999
- Chairman of Direct Aid, 1999 – 2008 Member of the Kuwaiti Red Crescent Society – Kuwait
- Editor-in-Chief of Al Kawther Magazine, 1984 until his death.
- Member of the council of trustees of Islamic Call Organization – Sudan
- Member of the council of trustees of Science and Technology University – Yemen
- Chairman of the board of Faculty of Education – Zanzibar
- Chairman of the board of Faculty of Shari’ah and Islamic Studies – Kenya
- Chairman of Charity Work Studies Center – Kuwait

=== Direct Aid ===
In 1981, Al-Sumait founded the Africa Muslim Agency, later renamed as a "Direct Aid" society. The society provides extensive humanitarian assistance to impoverished people throughout Africa. It has built 124 hospitals and dispensaries, 840 schools, 204 Islamic centers, 214 women training centers, and 2,200 mosques. The society has also established two colleges in Kenya and Zanzibar, offered 200 scholarships to Muslim African students to pursue higher studies in medicine, engineering, and technology.

Direct Aid has its offices in 29 African countries. In addition to that, it was considered a General Consultant in the Economical and Social Board of the United Nations in 1998.

In 1999, he received the Order of the Two Niles.

== Detention and Imprisonment ==
AL-Sumait was imprisoned twice in his life. The first in Baghdad in 1970 and the second time in 1990 when he was arrested by Iraqi intelligence forces during the Iraqi invasion of Kuwait. He was shipped to Baghdad and subjected to severe torture. Later in his life when looking back at this terrible ordeal he stated:

I had no doubt whatsoever that I would not die except at the moment Allah had ordained for me.

== Final Months and Death ==
Al-Sumait struggled through the last few months of his life, traveling from Kuwait to numerous places, including Germany, in search of medical treatment for his ever-worsening medical state.

On 15 August 2013, it was announced that Al-Sumait died from complications of a heart condition.
