= Ghaith bin Moubarak Al-Kuwari =

Qatari Muslim Scholar

Ghaith bin Moubarak Al-Kuwari ( Arabic غيث بن مبارك الكواري ) (born 1969 in Doha, Qatar) is a Qatari Muslim Scholar And Minister of Endowments (Awqaf) and Islamic Affairs in Qatar.

== Biography ==
Ghaith was born in Doha, Qatar and has a bachelor's degree in Islamic Sharia from Imam Muhammad bin Saud Islamic University in the United Arab Emirates.

Al-Kuwari received a master's degree in Islamic sciences from Dar Al-Hadith Al-Hassania, and a doctorate in Islamic studies from Ibn Tofail University in Morocco.

== Career ==
In 2008, Al-Kuwari was appointed Director of Planning and Follow Up at the Ministry of Endowments and Islamic Affairs.

Between 2006 and 2008, he was Director of the Dawa Department of the Ministry of Endowments and Islamic Affairs.

In 2016, he received the Order of the Two Niles.
