= Sash of Honour =

Sudanese Order

Sash of Honour وشاح الشرف
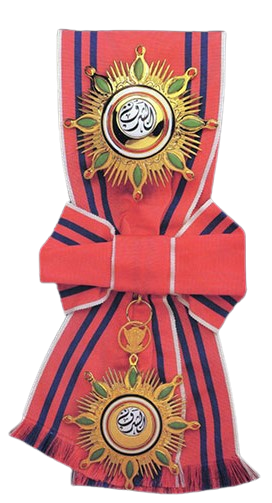

Awarded by Sudan
- Type: Presidential sash
- Established: 1956; 69 years ago
- Country: Sudan
- Eligibility: Head of State
- Awarded for: Providing great services to the state
- Status: Currently constituted
- Sudan Head of state

Precedence
- Next (higher): Collar of Honour
- Ribbon bar of the Sash

The Sash of Honour (Arabic: وشاح الشرف, romanized: wišāḥ aš-šaraf) is a state decoration of Sudan established in 1956 after Sudan independence. It is given to Sudanese who have excelled in service to the nation. It may be given to foreign governments and heads of state, but shall not be given to more than fifteen living recipients.

For the awards instituted after 1961, it is not permissible to repeat awarding of decorations and medals, or to rise from one class to a higher one, except after the lapse of at least three years from the date of awarding them. This period is reduced to one year for employees if they are referred to retirement, and the Sports Medal is excluded from the period condition. Orders and medals remain the property of the awardee, and their heirs as a souvenir without any of them having the right to carry it. Without prejudice to any other punishment stipulated in the laws of Sudan, it is permissible, by order of the President of the Republic, to strip the bearer of a necklace, sash, medal, medallion, cloak of honour, or belt if they commit an act that is dishonourable or inconsistent with loyalty to the state.

== Insignia ==
The sash consists of a bright red wavy silk sash divided longitudinally by four blue stripes and two white stripes at the ends. The sash ends with a medal consisting of three tandem surfaces. The first of the white dial has the word (Honor) written on it in black and is surrounded by the colours of the flag of the Democratic Republic of Sudan. The second and third surfaces are made of copper plated with gold, in addition to blue and green enamel decorations on the edges of the second surface. The medal hangs from a golden circle in the middle, which is a drawing of the emblem of the Democratic Republic of Sudan (Secretarybird) wears a scarf from right to left and follows the scarf with a large medal (medallion) carried on the chest from the left side.

== Notable recipients ==
- 1993 Ketty Alejandrina Lis
- Sultan bin Muhammad Al-Qasimi
