= Order of Merit (Sudan) =

Sudanese Order

Order of Merit نوط الجدارة
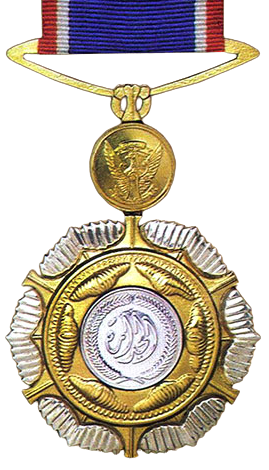

Awarded by Sudan
- Type: Order of Merit
- Established: 16 November 1961; 63 years ago
- Country: Sudan
- Awarded for: long service and performance with honesty, devotion, and excellent character
- Status: Currently constituted
- Classes: Gold; Silver; Bronze

Precedence
- Next (higher): Order of the Two Niles
- Next (lower): Star of Civil Accomplishment
- Equivalent: Order of Excellence for Women and Order of Righteous Son of Sudan
- Ribbon bar of the Sash

The Order of Merit (Arabic: نوط الجدارة, romanized: nawṭ al-jadāra) or Order of Distinction is a state decoration of Sudan established on 16 November 1961 during Ibrahim Abboud's military government. It is given to government officials for long service and performance with honesty, devotion, and excellent character. These officials might be either Sudanese or foreigners. Order have gold silver and bronze classes. It had an associated medal.

It is not permissible to repeat awarding of decorations and medals, or to rise from one class to a higher one, except after the lapse of at least three years from the date of awarding them. This period is reduced to one year for employees if they are referred to retirement. Orders and medals remain the property of the awardee, and their heirs as a souvenir without any of them having the right to carry it. Without prejudice to any other punishment stipulated in the laws of Sudan, it is permissible, by order of the President of the Republic, to strip the bearer of a necklace, sash, medal, medallion, cloak of honour, or belt if they commit an act that is dishonourable or inconsistent with loyalty to the state.

== Insignia ==
The Order of Merit, the first Class, consists of gilded silver. It is round and engraved in shape. On its face is a star with five ribs, surrounded by a linear decoration. In the centre is the word "Medal" engraved surrounded by two branches of olives. On the other side, the phrase (Democratic Republic of Sudan) is engraved of green silk, divided longitudinally with five black stripes.

The second layer consists of silver. It is round in shape. A star with five sides is engraved on its face, surrounded by a linear decoration. In the centre is the word "merit" (Arabic: الجدارة) engraved surrounded by two branches of olives. On the other side, the words (Democratic Republic of Sudan) are engraved. A medallion is worn on the left side of the chest with a green silk ribbon. Divided longitudinally by four black lines.

The third layer consists of bronze. It is round in shape. A star with five sides is engraved on its face, surrounded by a linear decoration. In the centre is the word "merit" (Arabic: الجدارة) engraved surrounded by two olive branches. On the other side, the words (Democratic Republic of Sudan) are engraved. The Medallion is worn on the left side of the chest with a ribbon of green silk. Divided by three black lines.

== Medal ==
The Medal of Merit consists of three synonymous surfaces: the first is a disc of silver metal bearing the word 'merit' (Arabic: الجدارة) surrounded by two olive branches.

The second is a circular shape of silver plated with gold, from which six large branches and six other small branches branch out.

The third is a circular, serrated shape of silver. The medal hangs from a ribbon of shiny, corrugated silk of blue colour, with two red and white borders on the edges. Between the medal and the ribbon is a gold-plated silver disc bearing the emblem of the Republic (Secretarybird) and surrounded by two branches of olives.

Medal of Merit

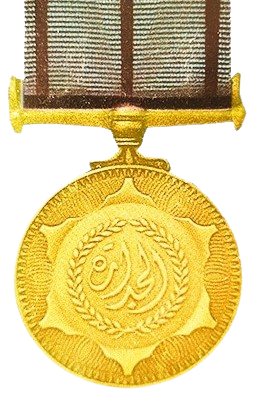
Gold

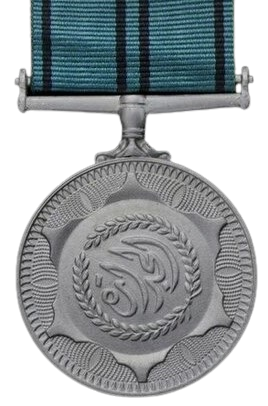
Silver

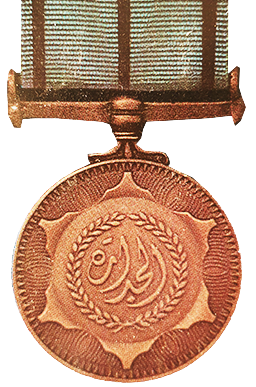
Bronze

== Notable recipients ==
- 1975 Andrew W. Riang Wieu (Silver)
- 1995 Ahmed Mohamed El Hassan
- 2005 Zaghloul El-Naggar
- Józef Gazy
- Hussein Jamaan
- Youssef al-Zein
