= Marta Ruedas =

United Nations civil servant

United Nations Development Programme

Marta Ruedas is a United Nations civil servant who has worked in many countries around the world, initially with the United Nations Development Programme, including Bolivia, Kyrgyzstan, the Republic of Georgia, Nepal, Mongolia and Mexico, as well as at its headquarters in New York. The organization assists countries in reaching their targets in economic and social development. In 2015 she was the Country Director of the UNDP in Kabul, Afghanistan.

In 2016, Ruedas was the United Nations Resident and Humanitarian Coordinator for Sudan, and, in 2018, she became the United Nations Deputy Special Representative and UN Resident and Humanitarian Coordinator in Iraq.

== Early life and education ==
Ruedas has a Bachelor of Arts from Cornell University, a Master of International Affairs degree from Columbia University, and a diploma in Russian studies from the Pushkin Institute in Moscow.

== Career ==
Ruedas served as UN Resident Coordinator/UNDP Resident Representative in Sao Tomé and Príncipe, beginning in 1999. She was then assigned to the same post in Bulgaria in 2001, at the end of which she was awarded the country's state medal, the Stara Planina Order, by former Bulgarian President Georgi Parvanov. While in Bulgaria, she helped to organize a UN project which provided assistance to the Government of Bulgaria in identifying and destroying surpluses of weapons and ammunition.

In 2003, Ruedas became the Deputy Regional Director of the UN's Regional Bureau for Europe and the Commonwealth of Independent States in New York. She left this post in 2007 when she was assigned as the UN's Deputy Special Coordinator/ Resident Coordinator and UNDP Resident Representative in Lebanon, where she was once again in charge of promoting economic and social development projects.

From 2011 to 2014, Ruedas worked for the recovery of crisis-affected communities around the world during her post as Deputy Assistant Administrator and Deputy Director for UNDP's Bureau for Crisis Prevention and Recovery, arranging public-private partnerships to accelerate recovery.

On 31 August 2014, Ruedas was appointed Country Director of the United Nations Development Programme in Kabul, Afghanistan, where she coordinated UNDP projects, including the construction of bridges, provision of water access to communities in remote areas of Afghanistan, and participation in the Afghanistan Peace and Reintegration Programme.

From 2015 to 2017, she was the UN Resident and Humanitarian Coordinator in Sudan. In February of that year, she traveled to a refugee camp at Tawilla, where 86,000 refugees had gathered, and, in 2017, she met with Sudanese president Omar al-Bashir and visited a camp in Darfur. In 2018, at the close of her mission, Ruedas was presented with Sudan's First-Class Order of the Two Niles by Omar al-Bashir who was indicted by International Criminal Court for Darfur genocide. The move was labelled "scandalous," and complicit.

In 2018, Ruedas was assigned as the UN's Deputy Special Representative and Resident and Humanitarian Coordinator in Iraq.
