= Suleiman Jasir Al-Herbish =

Suleiman J. Al-Herbish
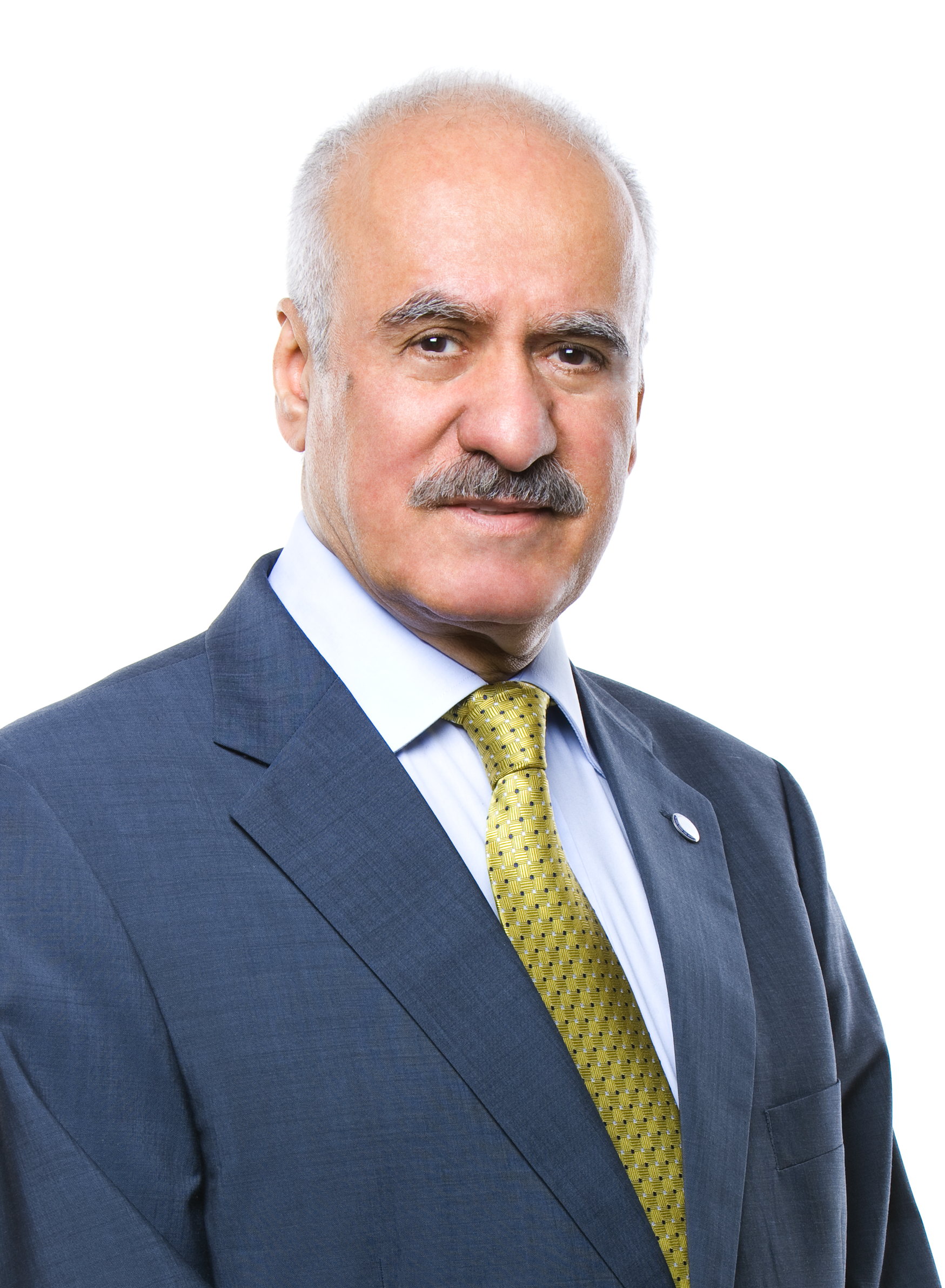

Former Director-General, OPEC Fund for International Development
- In office November 2003 – October 2018
- Preceded by: Yesufu Seyyid Abdulai
- Succeeded by: Dr. Abdulhamid Alkhalifa

Personal details
- Born: 6 November 1942 (age 83) Ar-Rass, Saudi Arabia

Suleiman Jasir Al-Herbish (born 6 November 1942, Ar Rass, Saudi Arabia)(Arabic: سليمان بن جاسر الحربش) ended his third five-year term as Director-General of the OPEC Fund for International Development in October 2018.

== Education ==
- 2018 - Honorary Doctorate, Universidad Amazónica de Pando. Bolivia, 2018
- 1978 - Course in "The Economics of Oil Transportation", London
- 1974 - Masters in Economics, Trinity University (Texas), San Antonio, Texas, USA
- 1966 - BA in Economics and Political Science, University of Cairo

== Tenure at the OPEC Fund for International Development ==
Suleiman Jasir Al-Herbish, a Saudi national, became the director-general and chief executive officer of the OPEC Fund for International Development in November 2003. Al-Herbish guided the OPEC Fund through a period of deep transformation which includes:

- Strategic re-positioning
- Organization strengthening
- Financial realignment

These developments have enabled the institution to substantially enhance the execution of its mandate and consolidate its standing as a prominent and respected player in the global development arena.

Al-Herbish and Energy Poverty Alleviation

Al-Herbish has been a leading advocates of energy poverty alleviation, having championed the cause for more than a decade. He was one of the first to label energy access as the “missing ninth” Millennium Development Goal (MDG). In 2012, UN Secretary-General Ban Ki-moon requested that Al-Herbish join his High-Level Group on Sustainable Energy for All (SE4All). In 2013, he received an invitation to serve on the SE4ALL Advisory Board, which he has served on ever since.

Prior to his appointment at the OPEC Fund, Al-Herbish had served for 13 years as the Governor of Saudi Arabia at the Organization of the Petroleum Exporting Countries (OPEC).

== Awards and honors ==
- Universidad Amazónica de Pando, Honorary Doctorate (Bolivia, 2018)
- Lifetime Achievement Award for the Advancement of the Organization of Petroleum Exporting Countries (Qatar, 2017)
- Grand Decoration of Honor in Gold for Services to the Province of Vienna (Austria, 2015)
- National Order of Merit (Côte d'Ivoire, 2013)
- Grand Decoration of Honor in Silver with Sash (Austria, 2013)
- Golden Medal of Merit and Excellence (Palestine, 2013)
- Order of the Two Niles, First Degree (the Sudan, 2013)
- Medal of National Recognition (Mauritania, 2012)
- Chevalier de l’Ordre National (Burkina Faso, 2011)
- Moroccan Order of Wissam Al Alaoui at the grade of Commander (Morocco, 2009)
- Commandeur de l’Ordre National Ivoirien (Côte d'Ivoire, 2009)
- Anania Shirakatsi Medal (Armenia, 2009)
- Prix de la Fondation (Monaco, 2007)
- Congressional Medal of Achievement (Philippines, 2005)
