= Orders, decorations, and medals of Sudan =

List of the Orders, decorations and medals of Sudan.

For the awards instituted after 1961 and it is amendment in 1976 and 1993, which stipulates it is not permissible to repeat awarding of decorations and medals, or to rise from one class to a higher one, except after the lapse of at least three years from the date of awarding them. This period is reduced to one year for employees if they are referred to retirement, and the Sports Medal is excluded from the period condition. Orders and medals remain the property of the awardee, and their heirs as a souvenir without any of them having the right to carry it. Without prejudice to any other punishment stipulated in the laws of Sudan, it is permissible, by order of the President of the Republic, to strip the bearer of a necklace, sash, medal, medallion, cloak of honour, or belt if they commit an act that is dishonourable or inconsistent with loyalty to the state.

No Sudanese may carry any foreign decoration or medal except after obtaining written permission from the President of the Republic. Any Sudanese who holds foreign decorations or medals that were awarded to him before the first of January 1956 may continue to carry them without the need to obtain the said permission. It is not permissible to carry foreign decorations and medals that have been revoked by the awarding country.

| Name | Image | Notes |
|---|---|---|
| Collar of Honour | | Awarded to the Head of state of Sudan and foreign countries. |
| Sash of Honour | | Given to Sudanese who have excelled in service to the nation. It may be given to foreign governments and heads of state, but shall not be given to more than fifteen living recipients. |
| Order of the Republic | | Established on 16 November 1961 and given to Sudanese and foreigners who rendered outstanding contributions to the government. The order has five classes. |
| Order of the Two Niles | | The Order of the Two Niles was established on 16 November 1961. It includes the five classes awarded to Sudanese and foreigners who perform great services to the state according to what is contained in each class. |
| Order of the Righteous Son of Sudan (or Order of the Loyal son of the Sudan) | | Given to Sudan citizens who protected the Republic's interests, particularly its foreign and domestic policy. The Order can be granted more than once. |
| Order of Excellence for Women | | Established on 16 November 1961. The Order consists of three classes and is awarded to Sudanese and foreign women who perform excellent services to the state or humanity. |
| Order of Merit | | Given to government officials for long service and performance with honesty, devotion, and excellent character. These officials might be either Sudanese or foreigners. Order have gold silver and bronze classes. It had an associated medal. |
| Medal of Merit | | Given to government officials for long service and performance with honesty, devotion, and excellent character. These officials might be either Sudanese or foreigners. Order have gold silver and bronze classes. It had an associated medal. |
| The Excellent Long Service Medal | | Given to military, police and prison officers for long and distinguished service, each having a distinct ribbon. It consists of silver. It is round in shape. Two crossed swords are engraved on its face, and the phrase 'Excellent Long Service' is written on it in bold script. On the other side, the phrase 'Democratic Republic of Sudan' is written in bold script. It hangs from a ribbon of five equal colors. On the next side is black. White-black-white-then black and worn on the chest from the left side. |
| Order of Science, Literature and Arts | | Given to Sudanese and foreigners who contribute to the state in education, science, and the arts. The order has gold and silver classes. It is awarded to Sudanese or foreigners who perform great work for the state in education, science, literature or the arts. The flag medal consists of a bronze medal plated with gold or silver, 40 millimetres in diameter and five millimetres thick. It is worn on the left side of the chest and consists of three tandem surfaces. The first is a circle with a diameter of 12 millimetres from the white enamel on which the word 'flag' is written in gold in the case of the gold medal. And in the silver colour, in the case of the silver medal, the second is a planet with five long branches and five other short branches, and the third is a circle whose circumference ends with the ends of the short branches. The red, white, and black have a combined width of 10 millimetres. On 7 November 1998, a similar award, Az-Zubair Prize for Innovation and Scientific Excellence was established by President Omar al-Bashir to commemorate General Az-Zubair Mohammed Salih, former Sudan's vice president who died in an aeroplane crash. |
| Order of Bravery | | Granted to military personnel and individuals of equal standing who render outstanding contributions to the State and display exceptional bravery. The medal have two classes, and an associate medal.: Class I: It consists of silver metal, and it is round in shape. On its front side is the word “courage” and in the middle of the circle it is surrounded by a group of swords and two branches of olives. On the edges is the phrase 'Democratic Republic of Sudan' and on its back side. The medallion is worn on the chest on the left side with a silk ribbon. Wavy bright red, longitudinally divided by five white lines.; Class II: It consists of oxidized bronze metal. It is round in shape. On its front side, the word “courage” is in the middle of the circle, surrounded by a group of swords and two branches of olives on the edges, and the phrase 'Democratic Republic of Sudan' on its back side. The medallion is worn on the chest on the left side with a ribbon of shiny silk Corrugated longitudinally divided by four white lines. |
| Medal of Bravery | | |
| Order of Production | | Given to Sudanese and foreigners who contribute to raising production, whether in the agricultural or industrial sectors or any other fields. The order has gold, silver and bronze. It consists of a silver medal plated with gold water in the case of the silver medal and bronze in the case of the bronze medal. It includes three synonymous surfaces. The first is a circle with a diameter of 30 mm. At the bottom, there is a gear symbolizing industry. On one side of the circle is a branch of the cotton tree, and on the other side is a design symbolizing energy. And technological sciences, in the middle of which is a curved shape that symbolizes openness to agricultural production with its multiplicity of varieties, and bears the word 'production' in a circular shape. The second surface is a star with seven branches sloping on the surface and the sides, and the third is a star of six branches with a flat top and sloping ends, and it is worn on the chest from the left side 22 millimetres. The green colour is mediated by one white line in the case of the Golden Medal, two white lines in the case of the Silver Medal, and three white lines in the case of the Bronze Medal. |
| Order of Sport | | Given to Sudanese athletes who triumph in national or regional competitions. The order has gold and silver classes. The first is awarded to Sudanese who win international sports championships and to those who make a great sporting effort. The second is awarded to Sudanese who win sports championships inside Sudan.: Class I: consists of three synonymous surfaces. The first is a shield of silver metal bearing the image of an athlete, and the second is a circular shape of silver plated with gold, from which eight branches branch out, each of which bears the drawing of a shield. The third is an octagonal shape made of silver metal. The medal hangs from a green ribbon of shiny silk divided longitudinally by five red lines. Between the medal and the ribbon is a gold-plated silver disc bearing the emblem of the Republic surrounded by two olive branches.; Class II: It consists of one surface in a circular shape made of silver metal. Eight branches branch out from it, each of which bears a drawing of a shield, and in the middle of it is a shield bearing the image of an athlete. The medal hangs from a green ribbon of shiny, wavy silk divided longitudinally by four red lines, and between the medal and the ribbon is a silver disk bearing the emblem of the Republic surrounded by two branches of olives. |
| Medal of Military Accomplishment | | Granted to commands, troops, or branches for various military achievements over time or for a noteworthy act or deed. Military Achievement Medal is made of silver and has four tandem surfaces. The first part is a circular disc with a diameter of 55 millimetres of silver plated with gold. The second part is a four-pointed star in oxidised silver on a circle with a diameter of 104 millimetres. The third part is a four-pronged star with a drawing of the gun and the sword in a vertical position of gold-plated silver. The distance between the two large divisions is 102 mm, and the two small ones are 84 mm. The fourth part is a circular disk with a diameter of 35 millimetres, on which the sunbeam appears, and in the centre is the Military Achievement Medal in oxidised silver. The medal hangs from a 55-millimetre-wide, shiny silk ribbon of four colours: two black stripes, each 5 mm wide, on the sides, followed by two white stripes, each 5 mm wide, followed by two green stripes, each 10 mm wide, in the middle of which is a red stripe 10 mm wide, which hangs with a silver clip. |
| Star of Military Accomplishment | | Given to military members who support the growth and development of the military. The star is made of silver and has three tandem surfaces. The first part is a star with four branches, the distance between the two large branches is 85 millimetres, and the two small ones are 70 millimetres, made of silver plated with gold. The second part is a circular disc of silver with a diameter of 38 millimetres. In the upper part are 25 heads of the Venetian sonke, a symbol of the 25 May revolution, and then the phrase “The Star of Military Achievement” in the lower part. The third part is the emblem of the Republic in oxidised silver inside a circle with a diameter of 20 mm. The medal hangs from a ribbon of shiny, wavy silk, 32 mm wide, consisting of four colours. Two stripes of red on both sides of the ribbon, each 7.5 mm wide, followed by two white stripes, each 4 mm wide, then green in the middle, 5 mm wide (and two black stripes on the ends, 2 mm wide). The medal is worn on the chest on the left side. A miniature silver medal accompanies this medal. It bears the same specifications as the larger medal, reduced to one-third in dimensions, except for the width of the ribbon, which is reduced to half, and is worn over the diaries for the military. |
| Medal of Duty | | Given to foreigners and citizens of Sudan who excel in work that advances security and public order. The medal has three classes.: Class I is gilded silver. It is round in shape, with a radiant sun engraved on its face, bearing within it the emblem of the Democratic Republic of Sudan, and engraved under the sun with the word “duty” and the phrase “Democratic Republic of Sudan” engraved on the other side. The chest is on the left side with a strip of green silk divided longitudinally by seven white lines.; Class II is silver. It is round in shape. A radiant sun is engraved on its face, and inside it is a drawing of the emblem of the Democratic Republic of Sudan and the word “duty” is engraved under the sun. On the other side, the phrase “The Democratic Republic of Sudan” is engraved. The green is divided longitudinally by five white lines.; Class III is bronze. It is round in shape. A radiant sun is engraved on its face, and inside it is a drawing of the emblem of the Democratic Republic of Sudan, and the word “Duty” is engraved under the sun. On the other side is “The Democratic Republic of Sudan.” The Medallion is worn on the chest on the left side with a ribbon of green silk divided Longitudinal with three white lines. |
| Medal of Educational Hierarchy | | Given to Sudanese or foreigners who successfully contribute to the educational revolution creating the groundwork for the educational hierarchy in Sudan. Medal has three classes. It consists of a bronze medallion plated with gold, silver or bronze, round in shape, 40 mm in diameter and 23 mm thick, and worn on the left side of the chest. It consists of two tandem surfaces, the first is a circle of blue enamel with a diameter of 12 millimeters, and the phrase “Educational Hierarchy” is written on it in gold, silver or bronze color, whatever the case may be. The phrase "Ministry of Education" is enclosed in a circle surrounded by the phrase "Democratic Republic of Sudan" 1970. The Medal hangs from a square ribbon of silk, 35 millimeters wide, with a green color in the middle, 4 millimeters wide, and on either side of it are two black and red lines 6 millimeters wide. |
| Order of Regional Government | | Granted to groups, businesses, and people who contributed significantly to creating a regional government. The order has two classes. |
| Order of Civil Accomplishment | | Granted to any governmental body, administration, public enterprise, or public sector business that makes outstanding contributions to any field of civic life that advance the civil service. |
| Star of Civil Accomplishment | | Awarded to members of governmental bodies, public organisations, corporations, or businesses operating in the public sector who supported any outstanding achievements in any civil field that contribute to the growth and development of the civil service or the public sector and who help foster an honest spirit of competition among its various units. |

== Discontinued awards ==
=== Anglo-Egyptian invasion of Sudan awards ===
| Name | Image | Notes |
|---|---|---|
| Order of the Palm and Crocodile | | Established in 1837 as a single class to honour foreigners and monarchy for exceptional service but was quickly discontinued. |
| Queen's Sudan Medal | | Established in March 1899 and awarded to British and Egyptian forces which took part in the Sudan campaign between June 1896 and September 1898. |
| Khedive's Sudan Medal (1897) | | A campaign medal awarded by the Khedivate of Egypt to both Egyptian and British forces for service during the reconquest of the Sudan. |
| Khedive's Sudan Medal (1910) | | A campaign medal awarded by the Khedivate of Egypt for service in the Anglo-Egyptian Sudan. Established in 1911 by the Khedive. |

=== 1933 Defence Force awards ===
| Name | Image | Notes |
|---|---|---|
| Distinguished Service Decoration | | Established on 4 November 1933. |
| Native Officer's Decoration | | Established on 4 November 1933 and awarded for 18 years of service. |
| Long Service and Good Conduct Medal | | |
| General Service Medal | | Established on 4 November 1933 and awarded minor campaigns, including the Italian Forces attack from June 1940 to November 1941. |

=== 1948 Police and Prison Service awards ===
| Name | Image | Notes |
|---|---|---|
| Medal for Gallantry | | Established on 15 December 1948. Members of the Sudan Prison Service and Sudan Police Force received medals for their bravery. |
| Medal for Meritorious Service | | Established on 15 December 1948. Members of the Sudan Prison Service and Sudan Police Force received medals for outstanding service. |

=== 1956 Sudan independence-related awards ===
| Name | Image | Notes |
|---|---|---|
| Medal of Evacuation | | Granted to all officers, students, and soldiers who served during the withdrawal of foreign forces from Sudan. It consists of a copper nacre plated with shiny silver, its diameter is 36 mm and its thickness is 2.8 mm. It is worn on the chest from the left side. The front side of the medallion consists of a flying camel inside a disc placed between the flags of the dual government on both sides, and the sun shining on the distant horizon in the form of a semi-circle from the top of the medallion. On the reverse side of the medallion is written the phrase "The Evacuation of Foreign Forces." The medallion hangs from a white ribbon of shiny silk, in the middle of which is the flag of the Sudan Defense Force, with two borders of red color on the edges. |
| Medal of Independence | | Granted to all officers, Military College students, non-commissioned officers, and soldiers serving in the People's Armed Forces as of the day of independence. It consists of a medallion made of mother-of-pearl, plated with shiny silver. Its diameter is 36 mm and its thickness is 2.8 mm. It is worn on the left side of the chest. The front side of the Medal consists of the flag of independence raised and the flags of the Condominium on both sides are lowered, and the sun's radiance on the horizon appears in the form of a semicircle behind the flags. On the reverse side of the medallion is written the phrase "Independence of Sudan". |
| Order of Political Accomplishment | | Granted to the national organisations, businesses, and members of the first Senate and House of Representatives. |

=== 1969 coup d’état related medals ===
| Name | Image | Notes |
|---|---|---|
| Medal of the Revolution | | Granted to people in the military and others who contributed significantly to the 25 May 1969 Sudanese coup d'état. The Medal of the Revolution is a medal of three synonymous surfaces of shiny bronze. Its surface consists of a shield written in the middle of the phrase '25 May 1969'. Its second surface consists of a Secretarybird with spread wings hanging from its shattered leg. In front of the Secretarybird’s body are a gun with a torch, and its surface intersects. The third is from a decorated circle. On the back side of the Medal is written the phrase "25 May 1969 Revolution, the Democratic Republic of Sudan." The Medal hangs from a shiny, wavy silk ribbon in the middle of which is black with two oval margins, each with a line of green in the middle, and between the Medal and the ribbon is a decorative bow of bronze. The Medal is worn on the chest. From the left side. |
| Medal of the Alliance | | Awarded to people, institutions, or groups who make exceptional efforts in thinking or action and effectively enhance the values of democracy, socialism, and national unity. The Medal of the Alliance consists of two classes medal.The first layer consists of a background of black and green colours. the second layer consists of a five-pointed star representing the five categories of the People's Working Forces Alliance. In the centre of the star is the emblem of the Republic on white ground. The emblem is surrounded by a red ring, symbolising national unity within the People's Working Forces Alliance framework. Five groups consisting of five rays emerge from the heads of the star. The decoration hangs from a ribbon of one colour, green. |
| Medal of Victory | | Awarded to members of the armed forces, police, and prisons who excelled in protecting the coup. The medal consists of two synonymous surfaces of copper coated with oxidised silver: the lower surface consists of fourteen in a circle of 50 millimetres in diameter bearing on the back the phrase 'Victory 1971' in the middle of a circle of 32 millimetres in diameter and on both sides of it are olive branches. The upper surface is a circle with a diameter of 32 millimetres, on which is the picture of the President, Commander Jaafar Muhammad Nimeiri, receiving the torch of victory from the masses of the people on Victory Day. The decoration hangs from a ribbon of shiny silk, 32 millimetres wide. It consists of two black lines on both sides of the ribbon, each 3 millimetres wide. Each line is directly followed by a green line of the same colour as the flag of Sudan. Its width is 10 cm. In the middle is a white line whose width is 6 millimetres. |
| Medal of Persistence | | Granted to members of the armed forces, security forces, police, jail services, and fire services for displaying tenacity, bravery, sacrifice, and martyrdom in defending the coup. |
| Medal of National Unity | | Granted to both military and civilian participants in the coup who approach it with unwavering devotion to its guiding ideals. The medal consists of three tandem surfaces of oxidised silver-coated copper: the lower surface is a disc 28 millimetres in diameter and 1.2 millimetres thick. The middle surface is part of a circle with a diameter of 50 mm in the shape of 25 millimetres. Its rays are of the rising sun (symbolising the 25 May Revolution), in the middle is Secretarybird, on both sides are olive branches, and above it is the phrase 'National Unity'. The upper surface is the flag of Sudan with the enamel and the four colours red, white, black and green in its well-known form. The medal hangs from a ribbon of shiny, corrugated silk, 32 millimetres wide. It consists of nine green stripes representing the nine districts of Sudan, and eight white stripes. The width of each green and white strip is 1.88 millimetres. The distribution of stripes begins with green and ends with green as well. |
| Medal of the Constitution | | Given to the First People's Assembly's Speaker and Members in appreciation for their historic contribution to the discussion of the draft Constitution. The Medal consists of two classes: Class I: It consists of an inner circle divided horizontally in the upper part by five stars representing the groups of the working people’s forces, including farmers, workers, soldiers, intellectuals, and national capitalism. In the middle of the circle are eleven columns representing the building of the People’s Hall in which the constitution was completed. On both sides of the circle, twenty-five radial columns emerge, representing the revolution of 25 May, and in the upper, and based on the first circle, another circle bears the emblem of the Republic, topped by the scale of justice, and at the bottom of the layer, the structure of the medal has two branches branching out on both sides.; Class II: It consists of Toshi sheets on both sides, symbolising the Permanent Book of the Constitution. On the back is the phrase 'Medal of the Constitution' inside a circle with the date of completion of the constitution 1973 on top. The medal hangs from a ribbon of shiny, corrugated silk, 32 millimetres wide, consisting of five divisions, green on both sides with a width of 3 millimetres, followed by white with a width of 3 millimetres, then green in the middle. area of 20 mm. |
