= James R. Allen =

United States Air Force General

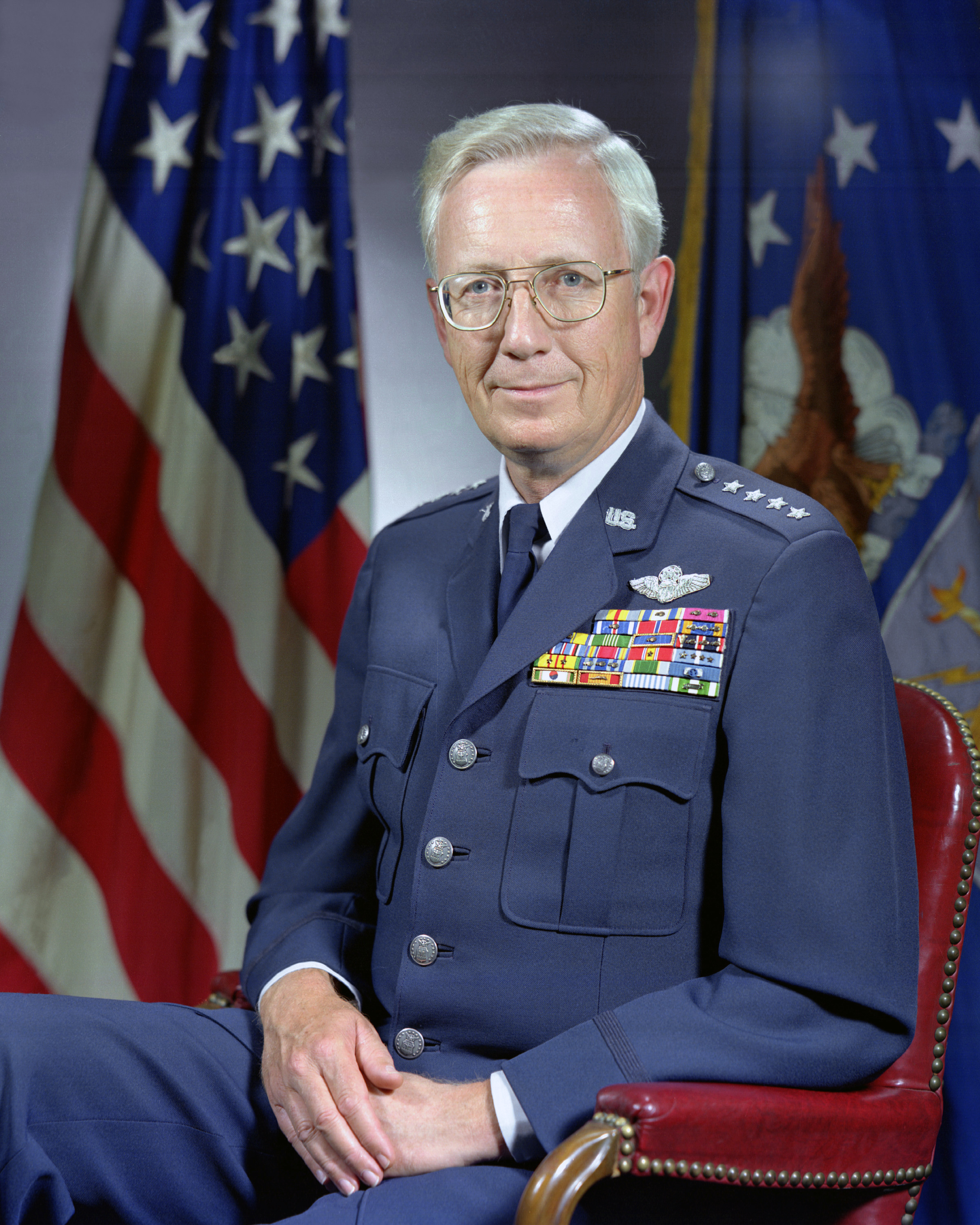
- General James R. Allen
- Born: November 17, 1925; Louisville, Kentucky, United States
- Died: August 11, 1992 (aged 66); Prince George's County, Maryland, United States
- Burial place: Arlington National Cemetery
- Military career
- Allegiance: United States
- Branch: United States Air Force
- Service years: 1948–1983
- Rank: General
- Commands: Military Airlift Command; United States Air Force Academy; 19th Air Division; 4th Fighter Squadron
- Conflicts: Korean War; Vietnam War
- Awards: Defense Distinguished Service Medal; Air Force Distinguished Service Medal (3); Legion of Merit (3); Distinguished Flying Cross (2); Bronze Star Medal

General James Rodgers Allen (17 November 1925 – 11 August 1992) was a senior officer in the United States Air Force who was commander-in-chief of the Military Airlift Command, with headquarters at Scott Air Force Base, Illinois, from 1981 to 1983.

== Early life and education ==
Allen was born in Louisville, Kentucky, on November 17, 1925. He graduated from the Louisville Male High School in 1943. That year, he was accepted into the United States Military Academy in West Point, New York, and graduated in 1948 with a bachelor's degree in military engineering and was commissioned as a second lieutenant in the United States Air Force. Upon graduation, he attended flight training at Randolph Air Force Base. In September 1949, he received his pilot wings at Nellis Air Force Base.

== Military career ==
Allen became part of the 18th Operations Group (18th Fighter Group) and served with them from September 1949 to June 1951 in the Philippines and South Korea where he flew the North American P-51 Mustang as well as the Lockheed P-80 Shooting Star.

During the Korean War, he few combat as part of a volunteer squadron with the Republic of Korea Air Force. From June to October 1951 he served as the aide to the commander of the Fifth Air Force. Upon his return to the United States in October 1951, he became a member of the 71st Fighter Squadron (71st Fighter-Interceptor Squadron) based at Pittsburgh International Airport (Greater Pittsburgh Airport). In June 1953, he was assigned to the U.S. Military Academy and served as a Company Tactical Officer.

Allen's first European assignment was to Ramstein Air Base in Germany from December 1956 to July 1959. During this time he served with the 53rd Fighter Squadron as a flight commander and operations officer. He later served as the executive officer to the director of plans Headquarters United States Air Force Europe. Upon his return to the United States in 1959, he was accepted into the United States Army Command and General Staff College and the following year was assigned to the Directorate of Plans Headquarters United States Air Force Washington, D.C.

In August 1964, he was accepted into the Industrial College of the Armed Forces. While there, he also completed a Master of Business Administration degree at George Washington University. In July 1965, he transferred to Eglin Air Force Base where he activated and commanded the 4th Fighter Squadron (4th Tactical Fighter Squadron). After a short time he went to Cam Ranh Base in South Vietnam, where he flew the McDonnell Douglas F-4 Phantom II as the deputy commander of the 12th Flying Training Wing (12th Tactical Fighter Wing). In December 1966, he became the deputy commander for operations of the 3615th Pilot Training Wing at Craig Air Force Base.

Allen returned to Air Force Headquarters Washington, D.C., in August 1968 and served as the assistant deputy director for plans. In August 1969, he became deputy director for plans and policy in the Office of the Deputy Chief of Staff for Operations of the United States Air Force (Deputy Chief of Staff, Plans and Operations).

While a Planner at The Pentagon he was one of the principal architects of Operation Ivory Coast (Son Tay Raid) a joint Army and Air Force helicopter raid on a North Vietnam camp on November 21, 1970, where 61 American prisoners were believed to be held, however, no American prisoners were found as they had been moved to a different camp. A total of 56 Special Forces soldiers, 92 airmen, and 28 aircraft participated in the raid. No Americans were killed but two were wounded.

In January 1972, he took command of the 19th Air Division at Carswell Air Force Base. In August 1972, he became the assistant deputy chief of staff for operations, Strategic Air Command (SAC) with headquarters at Offutt Air Force Base. After six months, he became deputy chief of staff for operations. In September 1973, he became the chief of staff for SAC headquarters. In January 1974, he became the special assistant to the Air Force chief of staff Chief of Staff of the United States Air Force.

From August 1 to June 28, 1977, Allen served as the 7th Superintendent of the United States Air Force Academy. During that time, the first female cadets were accepted.

After the academy, Allen was named chief of staff Supreme Headquarters Allied Powers Europe. In July 1979, he became the deputy commander in chief of the United States European Command. In June 1981 he became commander in chief of the Military Airlift Command, with headquarters at Scott Air Force Base.

Allen was a command pilot, who flew many types of aircraft including the North American T-6 Texan, North American P-51 Mustang, Lockheed P-80 Shooting Star, North American F-86 Sabre, North American F-100 Super Sabre, McDonnell Douglas F-4 Phantom II, Cessna T-37 Tweet, Northrop T-38 Talon, Boeing B-52 Stratofortress, and Boeing KC-135 Stratotanker.

== Retirement ==
Allen retired from the United States Air Force on July 1, 1983, having served for 35 years. He died from cancer at the age of 66 on August 11, 1992, at the base hospital on Andrews Air Force Base. Allen was interred at Arlington National Cemetery on August 17, 1992.

== Awards and decorations ==
In February 1979, the Government of France awarded Allen the Ordre national du Mérite (National Order of Merit) in the rank of commander. He also received the Order of the Two Niles from the Government of Sudan in November 1980.

He was promoted to the rank of four-star general on August 1, 1977, with the same date of rank.

US Air Force Command Pilot Badge

Defense Distinguished Service Medal
Air Force Distinguished Service Medal with two bronze oak leaf clusters
Legion of Merit with two oak leaf clusters
Distinguished Flying Cross with oak leaf cluster
Bronze Star Medal
Air Medal with two silver and one bronze oak leaf cluster
Air Force Commendation Medal with oak leaf cluster
Army Commendation Medal
Air Force Presidential Unit Citation with oak leaf cluster
Air Force Outstanding Unit Award with "V" device and three oak leaf clusters
American Campaign Medal
World War II Victory Medal
National Defense Service Medal with one bronze service star
Korean Service Medal with eight service stars
Vietnam Service Medal with two service stars
Air Force Longevity Service Award with silver and two bronze oak leaf clusters
Small Arms Expert Marksmanship Ribbon
National Order of Merit (France), Commander
Order of the Two Niles, (Sudan)
Republic of Korea Presidential Unit Citation
Vietnam Gallantry Cross Unit Award
United Nations Korea Medal
Vietnam Campaign Medal

== Personal life ==
Allen was married to Kathryn A. Allen. Together, they had a daughter named Katherine Lewis Allen and a son named Jeffrey R. Allen.

Military offices
Preceded by Albert P. Clark	Superintendent of the U.S. Air Force Academy; 1974–1977	Succeeded by Kenneth L. Tallman
