= University of Bakhtalruda =

University in Sudan

Coordinates: 14.017365°N 32.30949°E

- University of Bakht alruda
- Motto: Past..Present..Future
- Motto in English: January 1997; 29 years ago
- Type: Public
- Affiliations: Association of Arab Universities
- Vice-Chancellor: Gadalla Abdalla El-Hassan
- Principal: Yousif Khogaly
- Location: Ed Dueim, White Nile state, Sudan
- Website: www.bakhtalruda.edu

The University of Bakhtalruda is a university in the town of Ed Dueim in Sudan, on the White Nile, between Khartoum and Kosti. Bakhtalruda University was established under a constitutional decree issued by the Presidency of the Republic of Sudan on 2 Shawal 1417AH, or January 1997. It is a public university. Bakhtalruda University is a member of the Federation of the Universities of the Islamic World. As of September 2011, the university was a member in good standing of the Association of African Universities.

== Faculties ==
The university has Five (5) faculties.

- Faculty of Education
- Faculty of Languages
- Faculty of Law
- Faculty of Medicine
- Faculty of Science

== See also ==
- Education in Sudan
- List of universities in Sudan
