= Ed Dueim =

Ed Dueim الدويم
- City
- Location in Sudan
- Coordinates: 14°0′N 32°19′E
- Country: Sudan
- State: White Nile (state)
- Elevation: 1,240 ft (378 m)

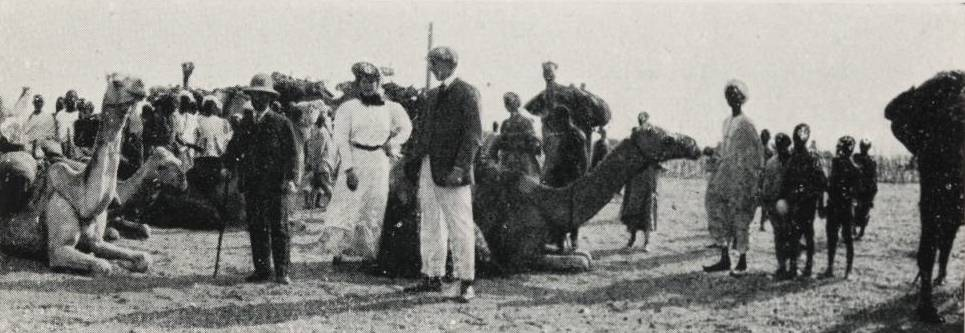
Several Englishmen stand in front of a group of resting camels and a large group of native boys in El Duem, 1906.

Ed Dueim (Arabic الدويم, also Romanized as ad-Duwaym, Ad Douiem, Al Dewaym, Dewaim etc.) is one of the largest cities along the White Nile in Sudan.

Ed Dueim is on the west bank of the White Nile, between Khartoum and Kosti. It is home to the University of Bakhtalruda, which lies to the north of the town. The university has played an important role in promoting education throughout Sudan. It is known for its two-year course called Al Sanatain, which prepared teachers to teach school, attracting students from all regions of Sudan and neighbouring countries.

== Geography ==
=== Climate ===
Ed Dueim has a hot desert climate (Köppen climate classification BWh) characterized by hot temperatures throughout the year. Winter, from December to February, is the coolest part of the year, while the period from April to June is the hottest part of the year. A weak wet season from July to September brings cooler temperatures and higher humidity levels, along with the vast majority of precipitation. The climate is very sunny throughout the year.

Climate data for Ed Dueim (1991–2020 normals, extremes 1961–2020)
Month	Jan	Feb	Mar	Apr	May	Jun	Jul	Aug	Sep	Oct	Nov	Dec	Year
Record high °C (°F)	41 (106)	43 (109)	45 (113)	47 (117)	46.5 (115.7)	46.2 (115.2)	44.3 (111.7)	42 (108)	43.5 (110.3)	44.5 (112.1)	42 (108)	40 (104)	47 (117)
Mean daily maximum °C (°F)	31.7 (89.1)	34.1 (93.4)	37.6 (99.7)	40.6 (105.1)	41.5 (106.7)	40.1 (104.2)	36.6 (97.9)	34.0 (93.2)	36.4 (97.5)	38.4 (101.1)	35.8 (96.4)	32.6 (90.7)	36.6 (97.9)
Daily mean °C (°F)	24.3 (75.7)	26.4 (79.5)	29.5 (85.1)	32.5 (90.5)	33.9 (93.0)	33.2 (91.8)	30.6 (87.1)	28.9 (84.0)	30.4 (86.7)	31.7 (89.1)	28.8 (83.8)	25.5 (77.9)	29.6 (85.3)
Mean daily minimum °C (°F)	16.9 (62.4)	18.6 (65.5)	21.4 (70.5)	24.4 (75.9)	26.3 (79.3)	26.3 (79.3)	24.6 (76.3)	23.7 (74.7)	24.5 (76.1)	25.1 (77.2)	21.7 (71.1)	18.3 (64.9)	22.7 (72.9)
Record low °C (°F)	8 (46)	7.5 (45.5)	13 (55)	14 (57)	18 (64)	16.7 (62.1)	18 (64)	13.3 (55.9)	16.2 (61.2)	16.9 (62.4)	11 (52)	7.7 (45.9)	7.5 (45.5)
Average precipitation mm (inches)	0.0 (0.0)	0.0 (0.0)	0.0 (0.0)	1.7 (0.07)	6.3 (0.25)	15.6 (0.61)	82.5 (3.25)	116.6 (4.59)	39.0 (1.54)	5.1 (0.20)	0.2 (0.01)	0.0 (0.0)	267.0 (10.51)
Average precipitation days (≥ 1.0 mm)	0.0	0.0	0.0	0.2	1.0	2.0	6.9	7.9	3.1	0.8	0.0	0.0	21.8
Average relative humidity (%)	34	29	22	23	32	42	57	67	59	46	34	35	40
Mean monthly sunshine hours	288.3	246.4	266.6	270.0	297.6	285.0	316.2	306.9	321.0	325.5	333.0	319.3	3,575.8
Source: NOAA

== See also ==
- Education in Sudan
- Khalil Osman
