= OPEC Fund for International Development =

Intergovernmental development finance institution

- Abbreviation: OPEC Fund
- Formation: 28 January 1976 (50 years ago)
- Type: Intergovernmental organization
- Purpose: Development finance institution
- Headquarters: Vienna, Austria
- Region served: International
- Members: 12 member states
- President: Dr. Abdulhamid Alkhalifa
- Website: opecfund.org

The OPEC Fund for International Development (OPEC Fund) is an intergovernmental development finance institution established in 1976 by the member states of the Organization of the Petroleum Exporting Countries (OPEC). The OPEC Fund was conceived at the Conference of the Sovereigns and Heads of State of OPEC Member Countries, which was held in Algiers, Algeria, in March 1975. A Solemn Declaration of the Conference "reaffirmed the natural solidarity which unites OPEC countries with other developing countries in their struggle to overcome underdevelopment", and called for measures to strengthen cooperation between these countries.

The OPEC Fund's objective is to reinforce financial cooperation between OPEC Member Countries and other developing countries, by providing financial support to the latter for their socioeconomic development. The institution's central mission is to foster South-South Partnership with fellow developing countries worldwide with the aim of eradicating poverty. OPEC Fund's headquarters are located in Vienna, Austria. The current president and chief executive officer is Dr. Abdulhamid Alkhalifa of Saudi Arabia, who assumed office on November 1, 2018.

== History ==
Following the First OPEC Summit in Algiers, Algeria, in 1975, Member Countries expressed their commitment to assist the developing countries through a collective financial facility. As a result, in 1976, the Finance Ministers of Member Countries met and established the OPEC Special Fund, through which Member Countries would channel aid to developing countries. The OPEC Special Fund started its operations in 1976, with initial resources of about $800 million. By the end of 1977 it had extended 71 loans to 58 developing countries, and had channeled donations from its Member Countries to other development institutions, including the International Monetary Fund (IMF) Trust Fund and the International Fund for Agricultural Development (IFAD).

As a result of its successful performance, member countries decided in 1980 to convert the temporary facility into a permanent legal entity called the OPEC Fund for International Development; it became a permanent international development agency in May 1980. The institution ceased using the abbreviation OFID in 2020.

== Member states ==
As of 2022, the OPEC Fund has 12 member states:

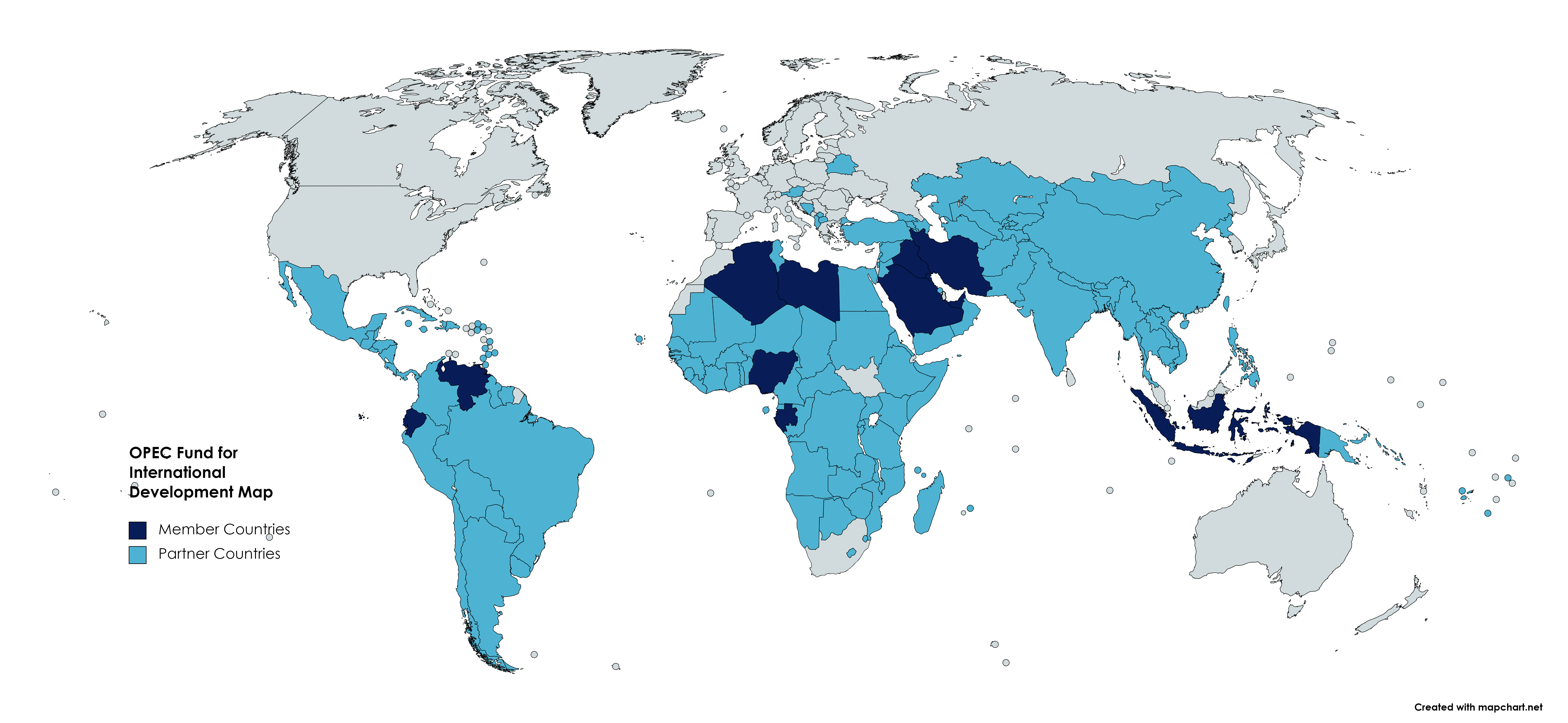
OPEC Fund for International Development Map

- Algeria
- Ecuador
- Gabon
- Indonesia
- Iran
- Iraq
- Kuwait
- Libya
- Nigeria
- Saudi Arabia
- United Arab Emirates
- Venezuela

Ecuador reactivated its membership in June 2014 after a 22-year absence. Qatar terminated its membership in 2019 at the same time it left OPEC.

OPEC member countries may apply for membership within the OPEC Fund. However, there are some OPEC Fund member states that are not part of OPEC (Ecuador and Indonesia) and some OPEC member states that are not part of the OPEC Fund (Angola, Republic of the Congo and Equatorial Guinea).

== Beneficiaries ==
All developing countries are, in principle, eligible for OPEC Fund assistance, although the least developed countries are given higher priority and have received more than one-half of the institution's cumulative commitments to date. Also eligible are international institutions whose activities benefit the developing countries. OPEC Fund Member Countries are excluded from benefiting from assistance, except in the case of disaster relief or within the context of a regional program. Over the years, the OPEC Fund has spread its presence to 125 countries.

== Means ==
The OPEC Fund provides financial assistance in a number of ways, with the distribution between the different types of aid changing over time as conditions in recipient countries evolve and needs alter. The methods of funding have included:

- Extending concessionary financial assistance in the form of loans for development projects and programs, balance of payments support and trade financing
- Financing private-sector activities in developing countries
- Providing grants in support of technical assistance, food aid, research and similar activities, and humanitarian emergency relief
- Contributing to the resources of other development institutions whose work benefits developing countries
- Serving as an agent of OPEC Member Countries in the international financial arena whenever collective action is deemed appropriate

== Resources ==
The OPEC Fund's resources consist of voluntary contributions made by its member countries and the accumulated reserves derived from the institution's various operations. A replenishment of US$1 billion was approved in June 2011 by the institution's supreme authority, the Ministerial Council, as a direct response to the increasing needs of developing countries and the negative impact of the financial crisis on their economies.

== Operations ==
The OPEC Fund's operations are organized into 8 focus areas:

- Agriculture: Funding has helped boost crop and livestock production, as well as improve rural infrastructure, such as irrigation systems and storage facilities for animal fodder. Support has also been extended to help promote agricultural research.
- Education: The OPEC Fund's financing has helped construct and rehabilitate schools, purchase equipment and teaching materials, as well as provide teacher training. The OPEC Fund has also sponsored the attendance of participants from developing countries to various conferences and workshops.
- Energy: A lead partner in the UN's Sustainable Energy for All initiative, the OPEC Fund has supported energy projects ranging from infrastructure and equipment provision to research and capacity building.
- Financial: Support to this sector has primarily been the channeling of funds to Micro-, small- and medium-size enterprises (MSMEs) via financial intermediaries such as national and regional development banks, commercial banks and leasing companies.
- Health: Support has included construction and modernization of hospitals, health clinics and other infrastructure. Capacity building and support to primary healthcare programs has also been extended. The OPEC Fund is also an active partner in the global fight against HIV/AIDS through a special grant program.
- Multisectoral: This includes undertakings that cut across more than one sector and often supports the activities of Social Investment Funds, whose projects are usually demand-driven at a local level and have a strong element of community participation.
- Transportation: The OPEC Fund's support has been consistently high to this sector and ranges from construction and rehabilitation of roads, seaports and airports, to railways, inland waterways and urban mass transit.
- Water and Sanitation: The OPEC Fund has helped finance a wide range of operations to help provide clean drinking water and safe sanitation systems. These range from large-scale water storage, treatment and distribution projects to village pumps and school latrines, as well as to schemes to optimize water use in arid regions.

== OPEC Fund headquarters ==
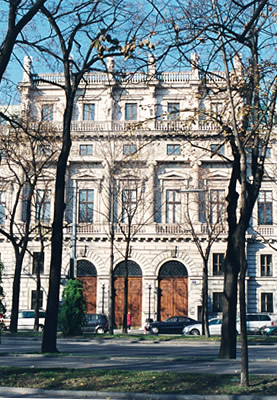
OPEC Fund Headquarters, Vienna, Austria

The OPEC Fund Headquarters (located in Vienna's first district, on the Ringstraße) was the residential palace of the Austrian Archduke Wilhelm Franz Karl. Built between 1864 and 1868 to the architectural design of Theophil von Hansen, the palace was sold to the German Order of Knights (Teutonic Order) in 1870 and used as headquarters of the Grand Master, the last of whom was Archduke Eugen. From 1894, it served as the palace of both the Grand and German Masters, acquiring the name, Deutschmeister-Palais. In 1938 following the dissolution of the German Order of Knights, the building was seized by National Socialist (Nazi) Germany and, in 1942, it was handed over to the police authorities. Between 1945 and 1975, it served as headquarters of the Vienna police. After an interregnum, the building became the property of the OPEC Fund.

== Energy for the Poor Initiative (EPI) ==
The OPEC Fund's Energy for the Poor initiative (EPI) emerged from the Solemn Declaration of the Third OPEC Summit, which took place in Riyadh in November 2007. The Declaration called for the complete eradication of energy poverty as a global priority and urged the OPEC Fund to intensify its efforts in support of this goal. The EPI was launched by King Abdullah bin Abdul Aziz of Saudi Arabia in June 2008 and subsequently adopted by the OPEC Fund as its flagship program.

Since 2008, the OPEC Fund has worked to push energy poverty to the top of the international agenda and was responsible for the acceptance of energy poverty eradication as a “missing” Millennium Development Goal.

In June 2012, the OPEC Fund Member Countries issued a Ministerial Declaration on Energy Poverty and dedicated a revolving minimum sum of US$1 billion to finance the EPI. The OPEC Fund is boosting the volume of its operations in the energy sector accordingly, in collaboration with all relevant stakeholders.

== The OPEC Fund and the United Nations’ Sustainable Energy for All initiative (SEforAll) ==
The OPEC Fund has Permanent Observer status at the United Nations. As a result of its high-profile advocacy efforts, the OPEC Fund is a key partner in Sustainable Energy for All (SEforAll), which has three goals: to achieve universal access to sustainable energy, to double energy efficiency, and to double the share of renewables, all by the year 2030. The OPEC Fund considers its own EPI as complementary to the objectives of SEforAll. In 2011, the OPEC Fund's then Director-General Suleiman Jasir Al-Herbish was invited to join the UN Secretary-General's High-level Group on SEforAll, which was charged with developing the Action Agenda that was presented to the 2012 Rio+20 Summit.

=== Public sector operations ===
Public sector lending forms the central pillar of the OPEC Fund's operations, accounting for more than two-thirds of total, cumulative commitments. These operations are carried out in direct cooperation with the governments of partner countries in support of their national development strategies. The OPEC Fund's public sector loans are concessional, with low interest rates and long repayment periods. Lending terms are based on several factors, including the per capita gross national income (GNI) of each Partner Country. Also included under the public sector is the OPEC Fund's contribution to the Heavily Indebted Poor Countries (HIPC) Initiative.

=== Private sector operations ===
The Private sector facility (PSF) was established in 1998 in response to growing demand among partner countries for investment in private enterprise, which is increasingly seen as the engine of economic and social growth. The Facility is a market-oriented financing window that responds to the demand for financing in developing countries in support of their private sector development strategies. The PSF seeks to promote economic development by encouraging the growth of productive private enterprise in developing countries and supporting the development of local capital markets. Successful interventions stimulate economic growth, generating jobs and income and thereby reduce poverty.

=== Trade Finance Facility ===
The OPEC Fund's Trade Finance Facility (TFF) was established in 2006 to broaden the means available to the OPEC Fund to alleviate poverty and promote economic development. It is a distinct, additional window for supporting eligible developing countries in their efforts to achieve growth and prosperity. The Facility seeks out transactions that are developmentally, environmentally and socially sound, applying credit principles in line with standard practices and setting reasonable market-based return targets. TFF financing has been used to support the import/export of a diverse range of goods/sectors, including oil, cotton, steel, strategic food products, garments and equipment.

=== Grants ===
Grants are awarded largely on the basis of the type of project and its expected outcomes; the number of beneficiaries; and the recipient country's socio-economic situation. The Grants Program includes the following sub-programs:

- Technical Assistance: Extended to national and regional development projects that aim at fostering sustainable development and reducing poverty. These cover a wide range of development sectors, with women and children given high priority.
- Research and similar activities: Supports activities that increase South-South and north–south cooperation, especially in the field of exchanging know-how and enhancing capacity-building, including human resource development.
- Emergency relief aid: To help mitigate the suffering of victims of catastrophes―including those in the OPEC Fund Member States. Assistance is channeled through specialized relief agencies.
- Special Health Program: Since 2002, the OPEC Fund has been an active partner in the global fight against HIV/AIDS, but this focus has now shifted to incorporate other preventable diseases, including TB, malaria and waterborne illnesses. Also targeted are non-communicable diseases (NCDs) such as cancer, diabetes and heart disease, which are more prevalent in poor developing countries.
- Grant Program for Palestine: This program supports sustainable development interventions in the West Bank and Gaza, as well as humanitarian relief in times of crisis. It also addresses needs in refugee camps in neighboring countries.
- Energy poverty: The Energy portfolio supports the OPEC Fund's flagship ‘Energy for the Poor Initiative’, and focuses on the delivery of innovative, medium and small-scale energy poverty solutions, primarily to off-grid, rural communities.

== Contributions to other organizations ==
=== Common Fund for Commodities (CFC) ===
The Common Fund for Commodities (CFC) is an autonomous intergovernmental financial institution established within the framework of the United Nations. Since 1981, the OPEC Fund has supported the CFC, having made available a total of US$83.6 million in support of the institution. The First Account of US$37.2 million enabled 38 least developed member countries to complete their subscriptions to the CFC First Account Capital. By the end of 2014, the OPEC Fund had signed agreements with 37 of these countries.

Under the Framework of Financial Support and within the context of the Second Account totalling US$46.4 million, the amount of US$37.9 million has been committed in support of 57 commodity projects in 52 countries; 32 in Africa, 14 in Asia and six in Latin America. Projects eligible for financial support are commodity-focused covering the value chain from production to consumption and benefiting the poor.

=== International Fund for Agricultural Development (IFAD) ===
The OPEC Fund has played a significant role in the establishment of IFAD, channeling US$861.1 million in contributions from OPEC member countries towards the agency's initial capital and first replenishment. Since IFAD's creation, OPEC member states have maintained their firm support of the agency, contributing to additional replenishments of its resources. In addition, the OPEC Fund itself has given a further US$20 million as a special contribution from its own resources.

=== International Monetary Fund (IMF) Trust Fund ===
Via the OPEC Fund, financial resources valued at US$110 million were transferred by a number of OPEC member states to the IMF-administered Trust Fund which was established in May 1976. Representing profits accruing to seven of these countries from the sale of gold held on their behalf by the IMF, these resources were allocated to provide concessional balance of payments assistance to eligible low-income IMF member countries.

== See also ==
- Arab Bank for Economic Development in Africa (BADEA)
- Arab Monetary Fund (AMF)
- Islamic Development Bank (IsDB)
- Kuwait Fund for Arab Economic Development (KFAED)
- Sustainable Development Goals
- World Bank Group
