= War crimes in the Sudanese civil war (2023–present) =

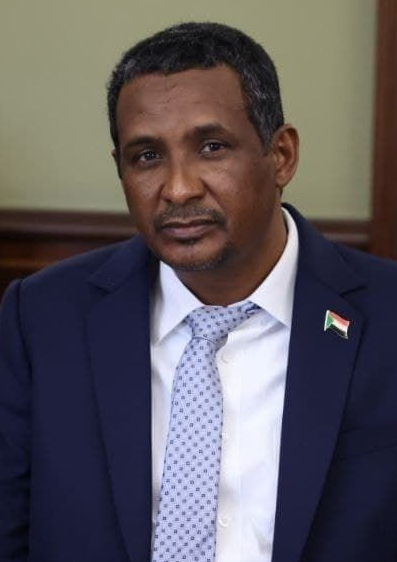
Hemedti, commander of the RSF, is sanctioned by the United States government and accused of genocide, war crimes, and sexual violence.

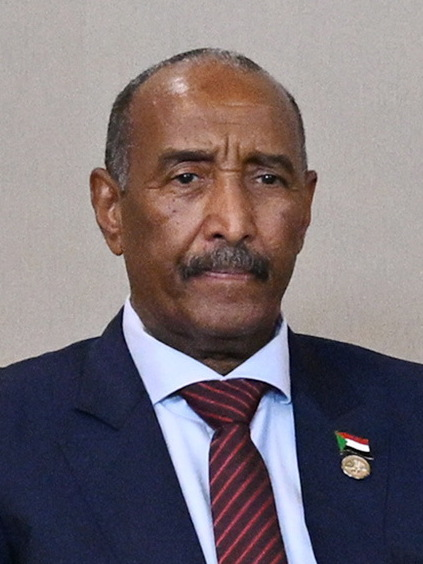
Abdel Fattah al-Burhan, commander of the SAF, is sanctioned by the United States government and accused of war crimes and using chemical weapons on civilians.

The civil war in Sudan, which started on 15 April 2023, has seen widespread war crimes committed by both the Sudanese Armed Forces (SAF) and the Rapid Support Forces (RSF), with the RSF being singled out by Human Rights Watch, and the United Kingdom and United States governments for committing genocide, ethnic cleansing and crimes against humanity.

The conflict has been marked by heavy indiscriminate shelling, gunfire, and airstrikes on markets and populated residential neighbourhoods, causing a high number of fatalities. Hospitals were targeted during aerial bombings and artillery fire, and medical supplies were looted. These attacks severely impacted Sudan's healthcare system, disrupting medical services and leaving the majority of the hospitals in conflict-affected states out of service. The UN declared Sudan the most dangerous country for humanitarian workers after South Sudan.

In Geneina, West Darfur, the RSF and Arab militias killed more than 15,000 non-Arab people. On 22 July, a Masalit tribal leader claimed that more than 10,000 people had been killed in West Darfur alone, and that 80% of Geneina's residents had fled. Massacres against the Masalit were recorded in towns such as Tawila, Sirba, Ardamata, Kutum, and Misterei, while a mass grave was discovered around Geneina. The UK and US governments, witnesses, and other observers described the violence in the region as tantamount to ethnic cleansing or even genocide, with non-Arab groups such as the Masalit being the primary victims. The RSF and Arab militias are also accused of widespread robberies, looting food meant to feed 4.4 million people, and sexual violence against Sudanese and foreign women, particularly Masalit and non-Arab women. NGOs estimate that the actual figure of sexual violence victims could be as high as 4,400. In March 2024, UNICEF reported that armed men were raping and sexually assaulting children as young as one year old. The UN was urged to start an inquiry, and governments were encouraged to allocate resources to aid survivors.

The RSF and Arab militias in Sudan are also accused of targeted torture and killings of intellectuals, politicians, professionals, and tribal leaders. Notable victims include Adam Zakaria Is'haq, a physician and human rights advocate, and Khamis Abakar, the governor of West Darfur, who was kidnapped, tortured, and executed. The RSF also targeted the families of their opponents, such as Mustafa Tambour's family. The SAF and RSF are accused of threatening, attacking, and killing journalists and activists during the conflict. The Sudanese Journalists Syndicate documented over 40 violations in May 2023 alone. Several journalists were injured or killed, and 13 newspapers ceased operations. Humanitarian workers were also targeted, with 18 killed and many others detained.

The International Criminal Court and Amnesty International are investigating war crimes and crimes against humanity committed during the war. The SAF accused the RSF of perpetrating these crimes. General Abdel Fattah al-Burhan (SAF commander) established a committee to investigate these allegations. Several countries proposed a motion to the UN Human Rights Council for an investigation into the atrocities. The UN Human Rights Council voted to adopt a resolution creating a fact-finding committee on these crimes. Human Rights Watch and the United Nations Integrated Transition Assistance Mission in Sudan have called for measures to protect civilians.

On 11 July 2025, the International Criminal Court (ICC) reported to the United Nations Security Council that war crimes and crimes against humanity are currently being committed in Sudan's Darfur region, including a severe humanitarian crisis with over 30 million people in need, amid the ongoing conflict.

On 25 January 2026, WHO published a report on the situation in terms of public health, stating that around 33 million people are in need of humanitarian assistance, with 21 million more facing a food insecurity.

== Background and casualties ==
Since April 2023, there has been a civil war in Sudan between the two main factions of the country's military government. The conflict involves the internationally recognized government of Sudan led by the Sudanese Armed Forces (SAF), under General Abdel Fattah al-Burhan; against the rival Government of Peace and Unity led by the Rapid Support Forces (RSF) paramilitary group, commanded by General Hemedti (Muhammad Hamdan Dagalo Musa). Smaller armed groups have also taken part on both sides, most notably Sudan Liberation Movement splinter groups, the Tamazuj militia, and the Darfur Joint Protection Force.

Fighting began on 15 April 2023 following a power struggle within the transitional administration established after the 2021 coup. As of 6 July 2026, the conflict has forcibly displaced over 14 million people, with 4.5 million fleeing the country as refugees, making it one of the largest displacement crises in recent history. The conflict has also seen heavy influence from foreign powers, especially Russia, Turkey, Saudi Arabia, Iran, Egypt, Ethiopia and the United Arab Emirates, while also experiencing effects from the spillover of neighboring conflicts in the Central African Republic (CAR), Chad and Libya.

The current war erupted amid tensions regarding the integration of the RSF into the Sudanese Army following the 2021 coup. Initial RSF attacks targeted government sites in the capital, Khartoum, and other cities. The conflict began with the Battle of Khartoum, and fighting then spread to the Darfur region. The capital region was divided between the two factions, and al-Burhan relocated his government to Port Sudan. International efforts, including the 2023 Jeddah Declaration, failed to stop the fighting, while various rebel groups entered the war: the SPLM–North attacked the SAF in the south; the Tamazuj movement joined the RSF; and the SAF gained support from factions of the Sudan Liberation Movement and Justice and Equality Movement.

By late 2023, the RSF controlled most of Darfur and advanced on Khartoum, taking over most of the capital, Kordofan and Gezira. The SAF regained momentum in 2024, making gains in Omdurman and retaking Khartoum by March 2025. Despite negotiations, no lasting ceasefire has been reached, and the war continues with severe humanitarian consequences and regional implications.

The city of El Fasher, the SAF's last stronghold in Darfur, was besieged by the RSF from April 2024. On 26 October 2025, the city fell to the RSF, with the city and neighboring villages suffering what some experts called a genocidal massacre inflicting between 60,000 and 70,000 deaths by one estimate. Satellite estimates have been as high as 150,000 dead, making it the largest massacre of the 21st century.

Sudan faces one of the world's most severe humanitarian crises, with widespread famine and 25 million people suffering severe food insecurity. Four million children are acutely malnourished, including 770,000 at imminent risk of death, and famine has been confirmed in several regions. The country faces extreme shortages of water, medicine and aid access, widespread hospital closures, disease outbreaks, mass displacement, looting of humanitarian supplies, and the near-collapse of education and infrastructure, leaving half the population in urgent need. The total death toll of the war comprises fatalities from violence, starvation and disease; thousands remain missing or were killed in targeted massacres primarily attributed to the RSF and allied militias. 61,000 people have died in Khartoum State alone, of whom 26,000 were direct victims of violence. Sexual violence has been widespread. UN under-secretary for humanitarian affairs Tom Fletcher described Darfur as the "epicenter of human suffering in the world".

There have been calls for more aid, legal protections for humanitarian workers, refugee support and a halt to international arms supplies to the RSF, particularly from the United Arab Emirates (UAE). The US, UK, EU and Canada imposed sanctions on entities linked to both factions for ceasefire violations and human rights abuses. Despite denials, the UAE has been found to violate these sanctions by shipping Chinese weaponry to the RSF, which largely funds its operations through gold exports to the UAE. Many civilians in Darfur have been killed as part of the Masalit genocide. On 7 January 2025, the United States government formally determined that the RSF and its allied militias committed acts of genocide. On 12 June 2023, the Sudan Doctors Syndicate said at least 959 civilians had been killed and 4,750 others were injured. On 15 August, the UN said that at least 435 children had been killed in the conflict. Doctors on the ground warned that stated figures do not include all casualties as people could not reach hospitals due to difficulties in movement. A spokesperson for the Sudanese Red Crescent was quoted as saying that the number of casualties "was not small".

According to BBC, The Guardian, CNN, PBS NewsHour, and Amnesty International widespread war crimes were committed in Sudan by both sides.

== Massacres ==
=== Darfur region ===
In Geneina, West Darfur, ethnic clashes that began in the last week of April had killed at least 1,100 people, while on 20 June the Sultanate of Dar Masalit claimed that more than 5,000 people were killed and about 8,000 were wounded in the city by the RSF and Janjaweed. On 22 July, a Masalit tribal leader claimed that more than 10,000 people had been killed in West Darfur alone, and that 80% of Geneina's residents had fled. Massacres were recorded in towns such as Tawila and Misterei, while a mass grave was discovered in Geneina containing the bodies of 87 people killed in clashes.

==== Geneina massacre ====
Geneina market after being torched in late April 2023

On 13 July 2023, a UN investigation discovered a mass grave of 87 individuals, all Masalit civilians, near Geneina, allegedly killed by the RSF between 13 and 21 June. The Darfur Bar Association reported the next day that the refugee camps of Kreinik and Sirba were under siege by the RSF. All makeshift shelters and refugee camps had been burned down by 20 June. Numerous villages, neighbourhoods, and cultural sites in and around Geneina were destroyed, including the city's Grand Market and the palace of the Masalit Sultanate.

On 22 June 2023, the Dar Masalit Sultanate also released a statement claiming more than 5,000 civilians had been killed between 24 April and 24 June, the majority of whom were non-Arabs. The Sultanate called the situation a "genocide", and footage emerged of corpses being used as barricades, and the bodies of men, women, and children strewn across the streets. Refugees from West Darfur speaking to Al Jazeera in late June corroborated these claims, adding that similar situations unfolded in the West Darfur towns of Misteri, Konga Haraza, and Tendelti between April and June.

The RSF also attacked civilians in June on the road between Geneina and the Sudanese-Chadian border. Many of these killings were at RSF checkpoints, where a pregnant woman was killed by militiamen for not having enough money for passage. A Geneina refugee stated that "the road along El Geneina and Adré has a lot of bodies, nobody can count them". Another source claimed over 350 people were killed on the road alone.

While Masalit people were often the target of Arab militiamen, refugees claimed the militiamen shot at anyone black. Prominent civil society members, including lawyers, humanitarian officials, and more, were targeted by militias and the RSF after and during the fall of the city. The Darfur Bar Association called the ethnic cleansing "a full-scale genocide". The United Nations released a statement on 24 June deploring "wanton killings", but did not mention perpetrators.

On 12 August 2023, a representative of the Masalit tribe, El Farsha Saleh Arbab Suleiman, gave a press conference in Port Sudan in which he accused the RSF of seeking to conceal evidence of crimes committed in Geneina by burying bodies in hidden locations and forcing the Sudanese Red Crescent Society (SRCS) to hand over bodies. The Coordination of Resistance Committees confirmed the reports of the mass graves and said that, as of 16 August, several bodies were still on the roofs of houses or inside buildings. More than 1,000 bodies were found in 30 more mass graves on August 15. Thirteen more mass graves were discovered on September 14 in Geneina.

In an interview with AllAfrica, Masalit civilians in Adré recounted their experiences in the city, including the killing of a large group of displaced Masalit civilians within the city. Masalit Sultan Saad Bahar el-Deen stated around 10,000 people from his community were killed by the RSF. In CNN interviews on August 16, which included photos collected while the massacres were occurring, the last count of killed civilians was 884, and after June 9, it became uncountable, and that the town was a "ghost town". Civilians also stated that young Masalit children were massacred by the RSF.

Photos from the massacre showed several bodies in a pile in an abandoned and destroyed road in Geneina. A civilian stated that "bodies littered the street from Geneina Teaching Hospital to the southern parts of the city." Civilians who fled Geneina in July stated many bodies had been dumped in ponds in the area of Maragibir, a town west of Geneina. They stated that some of these bodies appeared to have been dead for months and that two groups of tribes had been killed or "practically exterminated" by the RSF, those being the Masalit people and the Burgo tribes. Others added that the RSF would use volunteers and civilians to take these bodies down, especially in the northern suburbs of the city, and provide bulldozers and trucks to bury the corpses.

==== Misterei massacre ====
Prior to the Misterei attack, a group of 300 RSF fighters and allied tribes surrounded the town on the night of May 27, with the exceptions of the south and west, where the fighters entered the town. The fighters came from the Awlad Rashid, Misseriya, and Awlad Janoob tribes, led by Mohamed Zain Taj Eldien and Hamid Yousef Mustafa. Some of the assailants came from the Mima and Bargo ethnic groups. The attackers arrived in twelve Land Cruisers, eight of which were RSF-owned, four of which were private. Other fighters rode on around 150 horses and 140 motorcycles. Around 90 Sudanese Alliance militants, a signatory of the Juba Agreement, intervened in the town, led by Cpt. Elteybe Abdulla Ahmed. Residents were fearful following the surrounding of the town, but there was "no way out".

The first clashes began at Shorrong mountain right after sunrise, when Janjaweed launched an offensive from the west. Later offensives came from the north and south. The Janjaweed came in waves, according to a veteran of the attacks, and many of the self-defence groups were spread out across and around the town in groups of 7 to 15. The Masalit self-defence groups quickly fell to the Janjaweed. Battles between the Sudanese Alliance and the Janjaweed lasted for three and a half hours, during which civilians stated the Arab fighters went house to house, killing darker-skinned Masalit and shouting "Kill the slave, kill the slave!"

Wounded civilians were brought to the Atik mosque, although Janjaweed stormed the place and shot at the wounded and those attending to them. After killing several people, Arab fighters cheered "We killed the zorga! (a slur for black people)." The Janjaweed also looted houses, farms, and shops, before burning down many neighbourhoods. The Misterei market was completely looted and torched. Satellite imagery taken on June 3 showed the entire town burnt down.

==== Kutum massacre ====
Clashes broke out in central Kutum on May 30, 2023, and spread to Kassab refugee camp on June 4, 2023. At least fifty civilians were killed in the attacks on Kassab, with many more injured. In the fighting, the market in Kutum was destroyed, along with much of Kassab. Minni Minnawi, the governor of Darfur region, called Kutum a "disaster zone" on June 5, and deplored the massacres. Residents speaking to Middle East Eye stated that the perpetrators of the attacks on Kassab were the RSF, and that official buildings in the town were torched. Many residents fled to El Fasher or Hashabah, both dozens of kilometres away.

North Darfur governor Nimir Abdelrahman released a statement deploring the killings. On June 7, 2023, the Sudanese Combating Violence Against Women Unit stated that at least 18 women, including teenagers, were raped by the RSF and aligned Darfur Border Guards after they captured the city. Attacks on villages surrounding Kutum began on June 9, with the mayor of Farouk town Mohamedein Bektum being executed by RSF fighters after refusing to give up his car key. In the June 8 and 9 attacks, at least thirty-five more people were killed in RSF attacks. Later, Governor Abdelrahman stated that 5,000 families in Kutum alone were in need of humanitarian assistance. By July, more than 90% of the population of Kutum had fled.

==== Sirba massacre ====
The town of Sirba, West Darfur has been subject to violent seizure and destruction by the RSF and allied Arab militias multiple times. During the war Sirba has experienced significant destruction and has been nearly destroyed or burned to the ground multiple times. Satellite data shows the massive fire destruction in the town in late July 2023, leading to tens of thousands of civilians fleeing for their lives.

The attacks involved looting, burning of homes and markets, and targeted violence against the ethnic African communities, particularly the Eringa tribe. These attacks have led to significant loss of life, with hundreds of residents killed and thousands injured or displaced, including many who fled to Chad seeking safety.

==== Taiba bridge massacre ====
Forty-two people, mainly women and children, were killed in an airstrike on 23 August 2023, while they were sheltering under Taiba bridge in Nyala, South Darfur, as most exits and entrances to the city were blocked off. Five families were killed, and many others lost 3-4 members each. Many of the killed were from the Taiba and El Sikka Hadid neighbourhoods, the former having recently been captured by the RSF. The airstrike was the largest single-day death toll of the battle of Nyala. Nyala-based journalist Ahmed Gouja stated that the Taiba bridge massacre was not the only one in the city during the renewed fighting, but that the others were impossible to reach or get information about due to the clashes. The RSF accused the SAF of indiscriminately shelling the RSF-controlled Taiba neighbourhood, and having perpetrated the Taiba bridge massacre. The SAF did not make a statement on the airstrike.

That same day, convoys from the Joint Darfur Force (JDF) reached Nyala to deliver aid to civilians, with the commander, Lt. Col. Hussein Yaqoub stating the force was strictly neutral. The Sudanese Communist Party decried the arrival of the JDF, claiming they only showed up after the carnage happened. Médecins Sans Frontières stated that all of their staff in Nyala were unable to leave, and were subject to their homes being stormed by fighters and civilians used as human shields. By early September, the el-Texas, el-Karari, and the southern parts of the city were the fiercest battlegrounds, with residents stating that much of Nyala was a ghost town due to indiscriminate shelling and RSF intrusions into civilian homes. Cell phone service was restored on 11 September.

==== Ardamata massacre ====
On 8 November 2023, the RSF and Janjaweed massacred between 800 and 1,300 in Ardamata, West Darfur, although estimates vary. The attack came after the SAF's 15th Infantry Division camp retreated to Chad. About 20,000 fled to Chad following the violence. Reports indicated ethnic targeting, specifically the Masalit community.

==== El Fasher siege and massacre ====
In May 2024 the RSF tightened its siege of El Fasher, which was home to hundreds of thousands of non-Arab refugees. In April 2025, the Abu Shouk and Zamzam refugee camps outside of the city were massacred several times by the RSF and allied Arab militias, killing hundreds of people between April and August. In the aftermath of the fall of El Fasher to the RSF in October, tens of thousands of people, mostly non-Arab civilians and particularly the Zaghawa people, were killed in the El Fasher massacre. Following the capture of El Fasher in October 2025, the fate of an estimated 150,000 residents who remained in the city is unknown; British MPs were briefed that 60,000 killed is the low estimate for El Fasher alone.

The Yale University Humanitarian Research Lab found "evidence consistent with Rapid Support Forces (RSF) conducting alleged mass killings after capturing El-Fasher" and said that the actions of RSF in El Fasher in 2025 "may be consistent with war crimes and crimes against humanity and may rise to the level of genocide".

=== Gezira and Sennar States ===
In December 2024, the RSF took control of Wad Madani, the capital of Gezira State, and installed their field commander, Abu Aagla Kaikal, as governor. Since then, the paramilitary group has been implicated in numerous attacks on villages throughout the state, committing severe atrocities such as murder, rape, torture, and looting.

On 28 February, the RSF was accused of killing 16 people in an attack on the village of Sherif Mukhtar. On 15 March, eight people were killed in an RSF raid on the village of Umm Jaris. On 22 March, five people were killed in RSF raids on El Hasaheisa and Rufaa. On 28 March, eight people were killed in an RSF raid on the village of Al-Takla Jabara. As of March 2024, the RSF attacked 53 villages in Gezira State.

In April 2024, severe violations by the RSF were reported in the Halaween area, leading to casualties, injuries, and displacement. Villages such as Manaqiza, Apsir, Al Takla Jubara, Kuzo Kabro, Istarhna, and Hababna faced violent attacks and artillery shelling. The RSF demanded money and cars, opening fire on villagers. For example, the RSF killed 28 people and injured 240 in Umm Adham village.

On 10 May, 13 people were killed in an RSF attack on the village of El Harga Noureldin in Gezira State. On 21 May 2024, the RSF killed 18 people in al-Tikaina village.

On 5 June 2024, the RSF attacked the village of Wad Al-Noora in Gezira State state, killing at least 100 civilians. The massacre followed after the RSF sieged and opened fire on the village. Residents reported looting of the local market and crops, and the RSF's violent actions, including beatings. On 21 June 2024, the RSF attacked the village of Asir in Al-Hawsh, killing around 17 civilians and injuring others as they left the mosque after prayers. This attack caused significant displacement among the villagers.

In July 2024, the RSF launched an offensive in Sennar. On 15 August 2023, hundreds of RSF troops launched a multiple hours long attack on the village of Galgani in Sennar State, storming the village while looting houses and other public properties, after which troops burnt them. The attack came after villagers launched a resistance against the RSF and successfully beat back a small RSF group. As a result of the attack, the village's medical centre took in at least 80 deceased victims which included twenty-four women and minors.

On 1 August, 23 people were killed while 24 others were injured in an RSF raid on the village of El Adnab. On 16 August, twenty people were killed in an RSF attack on the village of El Majma Goz El Naga. Six people were also killed in another RSF attack in Beida, Sennar State, while the group also set fire to the regional bus station of Wad Madani. On 19 September, the RSF was accused of killing 40 people in a raid on the village of Qoz Al-Naqa and killing four others in a separate raid on Um Jalud, both in Gezira State.

By October 2024 the SAF managed to thwart the RSF attack with field commander Abu Aagla Kaikal defecting to the SAF. As a retaliation Kaikal defection, the RSF started mass killing of civilians in eastern Gezira state. to On 11 October, six people were killed in an RSF attack on the village of Umm Maliha in Gezira State, while 16 people were injured by RSF shelling on Omdurman. On 21 October, ten people were killed in an RSF attack on the village of Tambul. On 23 October 2024, fourteen people were killed in an RSF attack on the village of Safita al-Ghunomab. On 25 October 2024, at least 124 people were killed and 200 others were injured in an RSF attack on the village of Al-Sireha in Al Kamlin District, Gezira State. These attacks continued for several days, with the RSF looting and vandalising properties.

On 29 October 2024, five people were killed in an RSF attack on Al Hilaliya in Gezira State.

In February 2025, Human Rights Watch reported that armed groups allied with the SAF targeted civilians in Taiba, Gezira State, killing at least 26 people. Witnesses identified the perpetrators as followers of Abu Aqla Kikal, leader of the Sudan Shield Forces. The HRW verified the attack using satellite imagery and videos, labelling it as a potential war crime. SAF condemned the incident as an "individual transgression", but has since not launched a full investigation.

==== Bodies in canals ====
Investigations published in December 2025 by CNN and Lighthouse Reports documented evidence of ethnically targeted killings by the Sudanese Armed Forces (SAF) and allied militias during the recapture of Wad Madani, Gezira State, in January 2025.

The investigation, based on satellite imagery, video analysis, and witness testimony, found that civilians were allegedly killed and their bodies disposed of in canals and mass graves. Videos geolocated to waterways north of the city showed multiple corpses in civilian clothing, some with bound hands, while satellite imagery identified objects consistent with human remains in canal beds near Bika and disturbed earth near suspected mass grave sites close to Police Bridge.

Sources cited in the investigation, including Sudanese security officials and eyewitnesses, stated that SAF-aligned forces targeted individuals accused of collaborating with the Rapid Support Forces (RSF), as well as civilians from non-Arab ethnic groups, including people from Darfur and South Sudan. Accounts included reports of summary executions after fighting had ended. A United Nations fact-finding mission member described the events as a “targeted extermination of people,” potentially amounting to ethnic cleansing.

The SAF stated that it condemned “individual violations” during the recapture of Wad Madani and announced internal investigations, though no public findings have been released.

=== Kordofan Region ===
==== North Kordofan ====
In October 2025, the town of Bara, North Kordofan came under RSF control. Multiple reports described retaliatory killings and summary executions of civilians accused of supporting the SAF, with estimates ranging from dozens to hundreds killed. Other reported abuses included abductions, arbitrary detention and sexual violence.

By October 2026, volunteers in Bara and surrounding villages had recovered and buried more than 600 bodies, most of them civilians. Local activists and volunteers attributed most of the deaths to revenge killings by the RSF after the group entered Bara in October 2025. Hundreds of additional bodies were reported to remain unburied in and around the town. One volunteer told Middle East Eye that "there is now no life left in Bara", while others warned of deteriorating sanitary conditions and the spread of disease.

==== South Kordofan ====
Between March and September 2026, unarmed civilians and prisoners of war belonging to the Otoro Nuba people in Kauda, South Kordofan were reportedly subject to ethnically driven massacres and attacks by the RSF and allied groups (such as SPLM-N) during clashes with local tribal militias. Many villages were indiscriminately shelled, torched and looted, leading to hundreds of deaths and injuries, as well as widespread displacement among locals. Dozens of civilians were abducted by fighters, with many being tortured and killed while under captivity.

Among those killed, detained or injured were a catholic priest, and several humanitarian workers, including 4 members of Samaritan's Purse. Women and children were deliberately targeted, with many being killed by firing squad after capture. SPLM-N fighters were also accused of attacking farmlands across the state, looting and torching crops before withdrawing. In some cases, entire villages and districts were destroyed or abandoned after these attacks, with many of them occurring amid a ceasefire brokered by RSF in the region.

== Attacks on civilians and civilian infrastructure ==
=== Hospital attacks ===
In Sudan's conflict, both sides have potentially committed war crimes against medical facilities and staff, as evidenced by BBC News Arabic. Aerial bombings and artillery fire targeted hospitals while patients were inside, and medical personnel were singled out for attacks, all constituting potential war crimes. Most hospitals in Khartoum closed due to weeks of fighting, impacting civilians' access to healthcare. Satellite data, extensive user-generated content analysis, and doctor testimonies substantiate the devastating effects on healthcare facilities.

The World Health Organization condemned these assaults as clear violations of international humanitarian law and demanded an immediate halt. The conflict led to attacks on hospitals such as Ibn Sina and East Nile, potentially meeting criteria for war crimes. RSF fighters surrounded the East Nile hospital and reportedly forced patient evacuations.

There were incidents of airstrikes without warnings resulting in civilian deaths. Several hospitals were commandeered by opposing fighters, compromising civilian treatment. Threats to doctors from both sides, including public accusations and intimidation, highlight the targeting of medical professionals. International medical organisations, including Sudan's Doctors for Human Rights, have documented these atrocities as potential crimes against humanity and war crimes, aiming to present evidence to international or national judicial authorities for accountability.

For example, on 18 April 2023, reporters said that armed personnel had entered several hospitals in Khartoum. On 25 April, despite the ceasefire, heavy artillery fire was reported in Omdurman, where a dozen people were injured after a hospital was hit. On 13 May, the SAF accused the RSF of attacking two hospitals in Khartoum. On 14 May, eyewitnesses in Geneina said Arab militias entered a hospital and massacred 12 non-Arab patients. On 15 May, The Sharq el-Nil Hospital in Khartoum was reported to have been hit by an air strike. On 22 May, fighting was reported around the Aliyaa military hospital in Omdurman and south of the city near the border with White Nile State, near a small airport.

On 1 July 2023, the Sudanese Doctors Union accused the RSF of raiding the Shuhada hospital and killing a staff member. The RSF denied the accusation. On 15 July, five people were killed and 22 others were injured in a drone strike on the Aliya hospital in Omdurman blamed on the RSF. On 16 July, the RSF was accused of attacking the Aliya hospital for a second day with drones. On 20 July, an 18-member team of Médecins Sans Frontières was attacked while transporting supplies to the Turkish Hospital in south Khartoum. On 1 August, the Doctors' Hospital, northwest of Khartoum Airport, partially collapsed due to shelling, with the RSF accusing the SAF of targeting the facility in airstrikes. On 9 October, three people were killed by SAF shelling on the Al-Nau hospital in Omdurman, and 20 people were killed by RSF shelling at a clinic attached to a mosque in the Samarab neighbourhood of Khartoum Bahri.

These attacks also severely impacting the country's healthcare system, and disrupted medical services, jeopardising the operation of remaining hospitals and clinics in Khartoum. Over 46 verified assaults on health workers and facilities were documented, resulting in fatalities and injuries. On 19 September 2023, the WHO also said that between 70 and 80% of hospitals in conflict-affected states were out of service, either for being closed or destroyed.

=== Indiscriminate shelling ===
From the start of the war since 15 April, heavy shelling and gunfire was reported in Khartoum, Khartoum Bahri and Omdurman as the RSF accused the SAF of staging a "sweeping attack" that continued through April, and May. During negotiations in Jeddah, Saudi Arabia on 12 May, there was no agreement towards a cessation of hostilities as air strikes and shelling in Khartoum. During May, two people were reported to have been killed in an SAF airstrike in Khartoum, and the Sudanese Doctors' Union said that at least 18 people were killed and more than 100 others were wounded after rockets hit a market in Mayo, south of Khartoum.

In June 2023, the SAF continuing the airstrikes and indiscriminate shelling of RSF positions in Khartoum and El-Obeid, as the SAF killed 10 students from the Democratic Republic of Congo in the International University of Africa in Khartoum. 17 people were killed by RSF shelling in the El Jamarik neighbourhood of Geneina.

During July 2023, the SAF airstrikes and shelling killed at least 16 people in Ombadda, Omdurman, between 22 and 31 people in Dar es Salaam district of Omdurman, at least 30 civilians in Nyala, and 18 civilians in Omdurman. The month also witnessed SAF's airstrikes of villages in the north of Gezira state, and 16 civilians and four children were killed during exchanges of rocket fire between the SAF and the RSF in Nyala and El Remeila neighbourhood, respectively. A child was killed and three others were injured by SPLM-N (al-Hilu) shelling of SAF positions in Kadugli.

In July 2023, the SAF airstrikes and shelling killed at least 29 people in Nyala with 24 people killed in a market, and 7 civilians near the central market in south Khartoum. At least 40 people were killed during heavy shelling between the SAF and the RSF in civilian areas of Nyala. Thirty of them died after a missile hit the Teiba Bridge where they had been hiding underneath. Six others were killed at a funeral. The SPLM-N (al-Hilu) attacked SAF positions in Dalami, South Kordofan, injuring two civilians from shelling. It also claimed that the RSF shelled the nearby Al-Salama area with mortar fire during their retreat, killing between six and ten civilians according to conflicting sources.

During September 2023, the SAF airstrikes and shelling killed at least 20 civilians, including two children, in Kalakla al-Qubba, Khartoum, 32 in Ombada, Omdurman, 51 in Gouro market in Khartoum, 43 in another market in Khartoum, 17 in Omdurman, 25 in Khartoum North, and 45 in Nyala. People were also killed by indiscriminate shelling by the RSF, including at least 104 people who were killed throughout Khartoum. At least 30 of them were killed in the Hilet Kouko cattle market near Sharg El Nil, while ten people were killed and 11 others were injured in the Aljarafa area in the north of Omdurman. More civilians were killed during clashes between the SAF and RSF, with 25 people killed in Omdurman, one in El-Odeya, West Kordofan, and 30 in El Fasher.

During October 2023, the RSF shelling killed at least 10 people in the El Jarafa neighbourhood of Omdurman, 20 people at a clinic attached to a mosque in the Samarab neighbourhood of Khartoum Bahri, and 190 people following two days of RSF artillery shelling of SAF air defence positions on Jebel Awlia, Khartoum. The RSF also shelled the Al-Takrir neighborhood near El-Fasher. The RSF shelling killed 11 in the Karari neighbourhood of Omdurman, 3 people at the Al-Nau hospital in Omdurman, and 3 people at the El Khamees Market in Zalingei.

In November 2023, at least 15 people were killed after the RSF shelled the Zaglouna market in Karari, Omdurman, and 12 people were killed by shelling in Karari, Omdurman.

On 7 October 2024, more than 100 people were killed or wounded in SAF airstrikes on the Fur Market in Hasaheisa. On 21 October, at least 31 people were killed in an SAF airstrike on a mosque in Wad Madani.

In addition, individuals of all ages have been trapped in the crossfire during frequent attacks in densely populated civilian areas, with both sides employing explosive weaponry that affects a wide area. Actress Asia Abdelmajid, singer Shaden Gardood, former football player Fozi el-Mardi and his daughter, and Araki Abdelrahim, a member of the music group Igd al-Jalad, were killed in crossfire.

On 10 December 2024, an SAF airstrike at a market in Kabkabiya in northern Darfur, killing at least 100 people. Many residents from nearby towns were at the market when the strike occurred. A pro-democracy lawyers' group claimed more than 100 people died in the town of Kabkabiya District while Emergency Lawyers said hundreds of others were wounded. They accused the Sudanese army for conducting the strike but the army said these were false accusations by pro-Rapid Support Forces political groups.

=== Chemical weapons ===
On 16 January 2025, Senior US officials reported that the SAF had recently used chemical weapons against the RSF in rural areas at least twice. The US also sanctioned SAF chief General Abdel Fattah al-Burhan for the army's conduct in the war. On 22 May, the US announced new sanctions on Sudan over the SAF's use of chemical weapons against the RSF.

== Ethnic cleansing ==
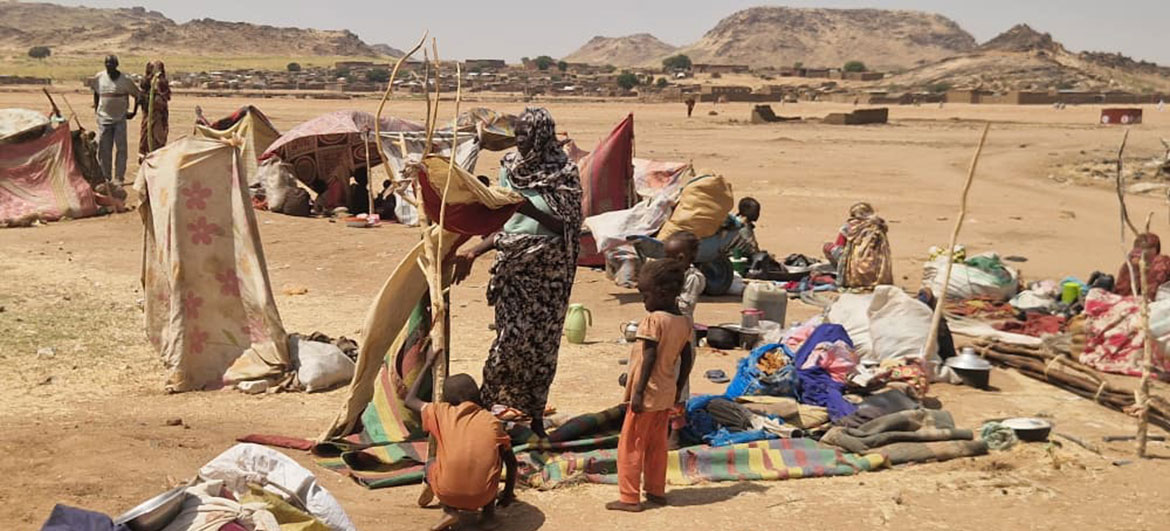
Internally displaced refugees setting up shelter in Tawila, the largest landing site of IDPs for those fleeing El Fasher.

The UK government, witnesses and other observers described the violence in Darfur as tantamount to ethnic cleansing or even genocide, with non-Arab groups such as the Masalit being the primary victims. Human Rights Watch said in May 2024 that targeting Masalit people with the objective of forcing them to leave the region constitutes ethnic cleansing. The context of the killings raised the "possibility that the RSF and their allies have the intent to destroy in whole or in part the Massalit in at least West Darfur, which would indicate that genocide has been and/or is being committed there".

Evidence has been mounting since August 2023 that the RSF is carrying out a systematic ethnic purge in Darfur. Warnings have been issued by the United States Holocaust Memorial Museum and the U.N. High Commissioner, Filippo Grandi, about the potential escalation into a full-scale genocide. In October, Genocide Watch issued an alert about the situation in Sudan, characterising the massacres performed by the RSF against the Masalit people as genocide. This view is shared by US academic Eric Reeves, who specialises in Sudan's human rights record, and The Economist. Josep Borrell, the European Union's chief of foreign policy, strongly condemned the killing of over 1,000 individuals in Ardamata and called on the international community to take immediate action to prevent a potential "genocide" in the area. The UK government, witnesses, and other observers have described the violence in the region as akin to ethnic cleansing or even genocide, with non-Arab groups such as the Masalit being the primary victims. Mujeebelrahman Yagoub, Assistant Commissioner for Refugees in West Darfur, described the violence as worse than the War in Darfur in 2003 and the Rwandan genocide in 1994.

== Blocking aid ==
The blocking or controlling of aid in Sudan is a deliberate strategy employed by the warring factions either by the targeting of humanitarian workers, or the denial of safe unimpeded access for humanitarian agencies within Sudan which constitutes a serious violation of international law and may amount to a war crime. The blocking and controlling of aid have exacerbated the humanitarian crisis in Sudan. With aid not reaching those who need it most, the situation has become one of the world's worst humanitarian crises. The United Nations High Commissioner for Refugees (UNHCR) reported that the war has displaced almost 8 million people.

=== Targeting of humanitarian workers ===
In the Battle of Kabkabiya, three employees of the World Food Programme (WFP) were killed after being caught in the crossfire at a military base. Two other staff members were injured. On 18 April, the EU's top humanitarian aid officer in Sudan, Wim Fransen of Belgium, was shot and injured in Khartoum. On 21 April, the International Organization for Migration (IOM) reported that one of its local employees was killed in a crossfire while travelling with his family near El-Obeid.

On 20 July, an 18-member team of Médecins Sans Frontières was attacked while transporting supplies to the Turkish Hospital in south Khartoum. By then, the World Health Organization had verified 51 attacks on medical facilities and personnel since the conflict began, resulting in 10 deaths and 24 injuries. On 25 July, Humanitarian Coordinator Clementine Nkweta-Salami said 18 aid workers had been killed and over two dozen others were detained or unaccounted for. The conflict has led the United Nations to declare Sudan the most dangerous country in the world for humanitarian workers after South Sudan.

The situation was further compounded by attacks on humanitarian facilities, with more than 50 warehouses looted, 82 offices ransacked, and over 200 vehicles stolen. One particularly devastating looting incident in El Obeid in early June resulted in the loss of food "that could have fed 4.4 million people".

=== Disease spread ===
According to UNICEF and the Executive Director of Human Rights Watch Tirana Hassan, the ongoing conflict has led to mass displacement of people, creating crowded conditions in refugee camps and other temporary settlements. These conditions are ripe for the spread of diseases. Lack of access to clean water and sanitation facilities, coupled with inadequate healthcare services, further exacerbate the situation. The inability of aid agencies to deliver necessary medical supplies and services due to the blocking of aid by both sides contributes to the spread of diseases.

=== Famine ===
The war has also led to a severe famine in Sudan. The United Nations has warned that the conflict risks triggering "the world's worst hunger crisis". With the ongoing violence restricting movements and the revocation of permits for cross-border truck convoys, humanitarian aid workers are barely able to help those in need. As a result, millions of people are acutely food insecure, and many face starvation. The blocking and controlling of aid significantly contribute to this worsening famine situation.

The Office of the United Nations High Commissioner for Human Rights has accused both sides of using starvation as a weapon.

== Sexual violence ==
The RSF and Arab militias were said to have committed sexual violence, targeting Sudanese and foreign women, especially Massalit and non-Arab women. Females have endured sexual violence, including rape and sexual slavery. There have also been reports of children as young as one year old being raped, as well as male victims. Gender activist Muna Malik reported widespread atrocities, including rapes by Janjaweed militia. UN experts alleged that rape was being used as a "tool to punish and terrorise communities".

In July 2023, the UN Human Rights office in Sudan disclosed receiving information on 21 instances of sexual violence involving a minimum of 57 women and girls. Sudanese authorities reported at least 88 cases of sexual assault on women across the country, most of them blamed on the RSF. Volker Türk, the head of UN human rights, pointed out that the RSF was implicated as the responsible party in nearly all reported cases to their office. Both the UN and local rights organisations suspect that these figures represent only a small portion of the actual extent of the wrongdoing.

As of July 2023, NGOs estimated that the figure could possibly reach 4,400. The Combating Violence Against Women Unit stated that it had recorded 88 cases of sexual assault in Geneina, Khartoum, and Nyala. CNN confirmed and substantiated cases of sexual assault carried out by the RSF, which included an incident captured on video. At a Chadian border site, the UN encountered pregnant adolescents, indicating further assaults. A survivor's sister became pregnant due to the assault. In August 2023, the UN Human Rights Council ought to commence an inquiry and establish methods to safeguard evidence regarding the violations, while governments invested in the matter should allocate additional resources to aid survivors of sexual assault.

In 2024, Al Jazeera reported that Sudanese women were forced to exchange sex for food or become mistresses to RSF fighters to ensure their families’ safety and access to food. In March 2024 it was reported that women were being abducted and kept captive for the purpose of sexual slavery. At least 93 women and girls had been reported as missing. It is believed that this number is much lower than the actual situation due to under-reporting because of social stigmas.

In July 2024, Human Rights Watch (HRW) released a report which stated that sexual violence in Khartoum has been "widespread." The report states that most of this violence has been committed by the RSF, but states that the SAF have also participated in crimes against humanity. The report states that countless women and girls have been raped, gang raped, forced into marriage and experienced sexual slavery. In November 2024, the UN Independent International Fact-Finding Mission reiterated similar findings to the HRW. Several cases resulted in death for the victim. In at least 4 instances, female health workers were subjected to sexual violence. While most reported cases of sexual violence have been against females, there were reports against men and boys as well.

In March 2025, UNICEF published a report titled "Sudan's Child Rape and Sexual Violence Crisis". According to this report: The data recorded 221 rape cases against children since the beginning of 2024. There are an additional 77 cases of sexual assault against children, primarily attempted rape cases. Of the 221 child rape survivors, 147 children, or 66%, are girls. 33% of survivors are boys. 16 child rape survivors were under 5 years of age, including four 1-year-olds.

In July 2025, the Sudan Doctors Syndicate said that at least 135 women who were victims of rape during the conflict died from suicide since the war began.

The UN expressed deep concern over the widespread sexual violence during the conflict but faces difficulty verifying due to limited access. Distinguishing isolated cases from systemic rape is crucial under international law. Underreporting due to stigma and fear, and inadequate support hinder accurate documentation. The use of sexual violence as a tool of war aligns with global patterns. Grassroots efforts attempt to aid victims amid collapsing healthcare infrastructure, as medical facilities face destruction.

== Theft and looting ==
The RSF and Arab militias were said to have committed robberies. During April 2023, the RSF was reported to have looted some residential areas in Khartoum, with residents of the Khartoum 2 area telling the BBC that the RSF had been going house-to-house demanding water and food. The RSF was accused of assaulting civilians and going on a rampage of looting and burning in Khartoum, Nyala, Geneina, and other parts of the country, including Merowe, and Kubum and Markondi in South Darfur.

Residents in Khartoum State and Nyala expressed concerns about widespread theft and pillaging, coupled with the complete lack of police presence and law enforcement." In May and June, residents in Omdurman said that widespread looting took place at the Libyan Souq, while the Somali embassy in Khartoum was ransacked and looted by RSF fighters. The World Food Programme's warehouses in El-Obeid were looted. Officials said the amount of food stolen was enough to feed 4.4 million people. The UN Office for the Coordination of Humanitarian Affairs (OCHA)'s 57 warehouses were also looted by the RSF, and the SAF diverted and confiscated medical supplies to their hospitals.

During August, the RSF attacked the town of El Khoi, West Kordofan, injuring three civilians including a journalist, seizing four vehicles including an ambulance and two others belonging to the police, and looting the town's savings bank and police station. Similar looting of government facilities, banks and other offices was reported in Al-Fulah.

On 17 September 2023, the SAF accused the RSF of setting fire to the Greater Nile Petroleum Oil Company Tower, as well as looting and burning the Khartoum Sahel and Sahara Bank tower.

The war also led to the destruction of the Mycetoma Research Center, a subsidiary of the University of Khartoum located in the Soba neighbourhood which was also the only facility in the world that dealt with mycetoma. The facility's director, Ahmed Fahal, added that its biological banks, containing more than 40 years' worth of data, were lost.

== Starvation ==
In March 2026, The Guardian reported that researchers at Yale's Humanitarian Research Lab had identified 41 farming communities in North Darfur that were attacked between March and June 2024. The Yale report described the RSF's systematic destruction of farming communities, livestock enclosures, and the residents of agrarian villages that had been an important food source for El Fasher. Over the 10-week period examined, the RSF attacked 41 rural farming communities, in some cases more than once, across some of Darfur's most fertile land. The attacks appeared aimed at dismantling local food production before the RSF siege of El Fasher, which began in late April 2024 and ended in October 2025. Legal experts cited by The Guardian argued that the pattern of village destruction, damage to farming infrastructure and livestock enclosures, and the displacement of farmers provided strong evidence that the RSF had used starvation as a method of warfare.

== Targeted individuals ==
Sudanese prosecutors recorded over 500 missing persons cases across the country, some of which were enforced disappearances, and were mostly blamed on the RSF.

=== Torture and killing of individuals ===
Several intellectuals, politicians, professionals and nobility were assassinated. Most of these atrocities were blamed on the RSF and allied Arab militias. Sudanese prosecutors recorded over 500 missing persons cases across the country, some of which were enforced disappearances, and were mostly blamed on the RSF. The RSF and Arab militias were said to have killed lawyers, human rights monitors, doctors and non-Arab tribal leaders in Darfur and North Kordofan.

On 13 May 2023, the RSF accused the SAF of assassinating an official of a football federation, Amir Hasaballah. The same day the RSF intruded into the Mar Girgis (St George's) Coptic Church complex in Khartoum's Bahri area. They reportedly shot five clergymen and looted money and a gold cross.

During an attack on 19 June 2023, emir Badawi Masri Balhredin, cousin of the Dar Masalit sultan, was killed by the RSF. Several other prominent people were killed in attacks on 19 and 20 June, including Sadig Haroun, the Commissioner of Humanitarian Aid in the El Geneina, and several mayors and imams.

In March 2025, a detention centre operated by RSF near Khartoum was discovered, revealing evidence of torture and a nearby mass grave containing over 500 unmarked graves.

==== Adam Zakaria ====
On 14 May 2023, Adam Zakaria Is'haq, a 38-year-old physician and human rights advocate, was murdered along with 13 patients at the Medical Rescue Centre in Geneina's Jamarik neighbourhood. Colleagues of Adam informed Amnesty International that an armed Arab militia, including RSF members, were responsible for the 14 deaths. Adam was providing medical care at a small clinic when he was killed, as the main hospital in Geneina had been previously destroyed by the same armed militia and RSF in late April. He was fatally shot in the chest, leaving behind his wife and two young sons, aged four and six.

==== Khamis Abakar ====
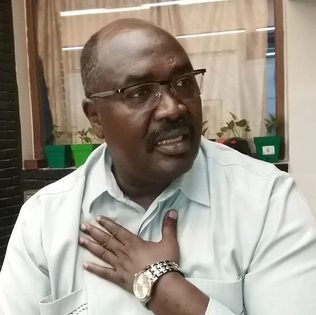
Khamis Abakar was tortured before being executed by the RSF

When the conflict broke out, the Governor of West Darfur, Khamis Abakar sided with the SAF. The RSF launched attacks on Masalit civilians during their siege on the city of Geneina, including members of Abakar's family. Abakar narrowly escaped an assassination bid when unidentified armed individuals opened fire on his vehicle on 28 April 2023. Confidential informants with knowledge of the incident informed Al Jazeera that the alleged assailants were reportedly associated with the RSF.

On June 14, 2023, an RSF shelling of the El Jamarik neighbourhood killed seventeen civilians, including relatives of the Dar Masalit sultan. One of the relatives killed was Dar Masalit emir Tariq Abdelrahman Bahlredin. 37 others were wounded in the attack. Khamis Abakar denounced the situation as a “genocide” on June 13, and stated the SAF was not leaving the garrison to help civilians. In response, the RSF called the Battle of Geneina a "tribal conflict".

On June 15, 2023, Abakar was kidnapped, tortured and executed by alleged RSF militants, led by Abdel Rahman Jumma, for his statement two days prior. The RSF blamed Sudanese forces for Abakar's killing, despite video evidence showing RSF soldiers assaulting Abakar. Masalit activists claimed Abakar was killed after he refused to refute his statements about genocide in El Geneina. The head of the JEM, Mansour Arbab, accused Jumma of the killing of Abakar, along with the Joint Darfur Force. Minni Minnawi, leader of the JDF, deplored the killing but did not accuse the RSF. Later, the UN High Commissioner for Human Rights deplored the killing.

==== Ahmed Abkar Barqo Abdel-Rahman ====
Ahmed Abkar Barqo Abdel-Rahman a member of the Zaghawa people and a member of parliament, was reportedly killed by the RSF in a raid on his house in Nyala on 22 August 2023.

==== Mustafa Tambour family ====
During the conflict, Tambour's house in Riyadh, Khartoum was raided on 8 May 2023. On 17 July, the RSF assassinated one of his brothers, Motwakel, on the Nyala-Zalingei road.

=== Targeting of activists ===
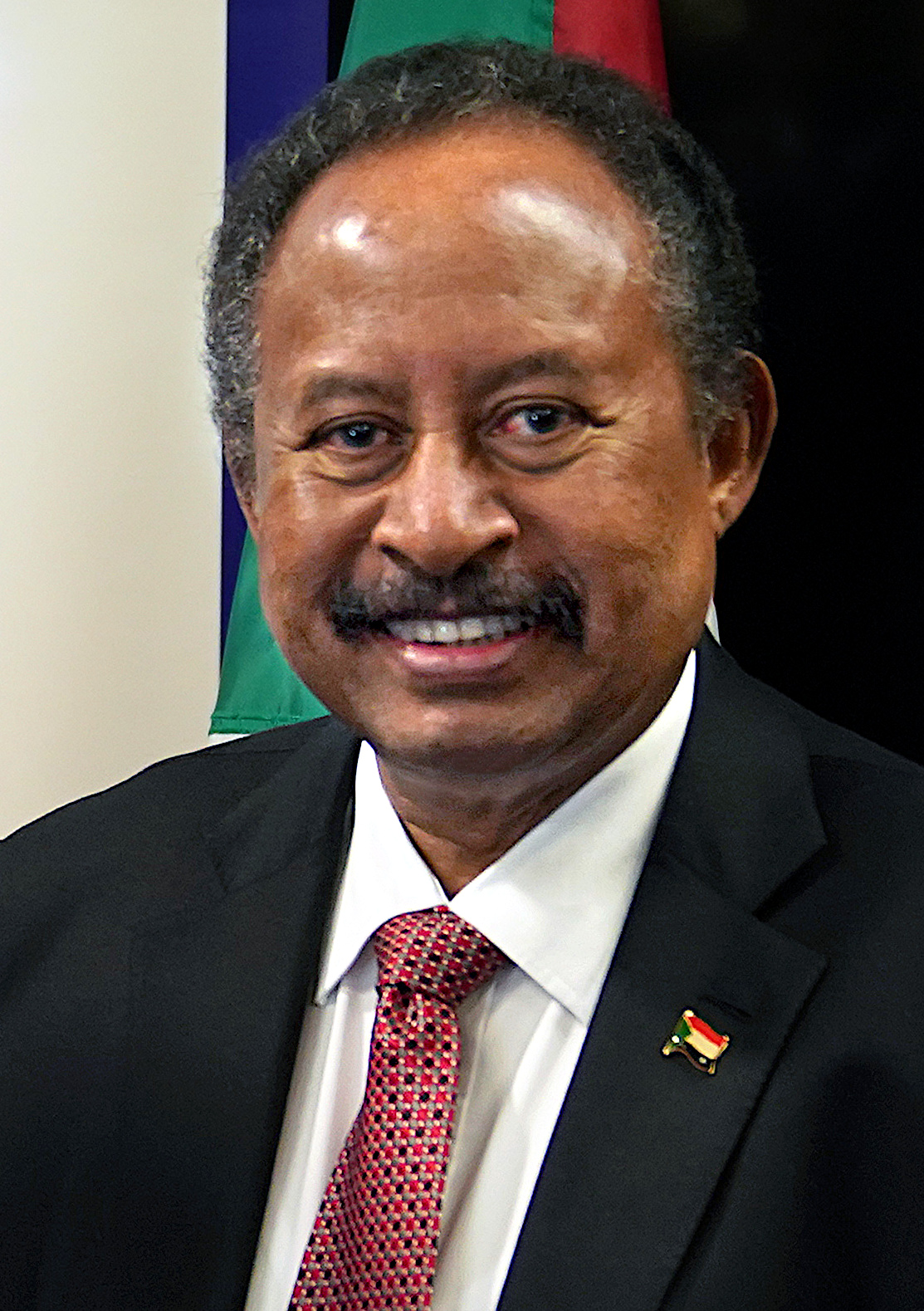
The SAF's prosecutors filed capital offence charges of incitement to war against the state, undermining the constitutional order, and crimes against humanity against former Prime Minister Abdallah Hamdok (pictured) and 15 other Tagadum members

Activists, including those from the "Stop the War" movement, have faced harassment, arrest, and even torture. Many neighbourhood resistance committees, the backbone of the civic protests, have turned themselves into emergency groups for humanitarian services, while some have formed armed self-defence groups and others have disintegrated.

Yasir Arman, a leading figure of Taqaddum, called for stopping the war in Sudan during the holy month of Ramadan. However, the response of the SAF to these calls and the actions taken against these activists have been a cause for concern.

Activists, from the Emergency Response Rooms and others involved in running soup kitchens to feed the hungry, have been arrested under unknown charges. These arrests are part of a broader strategy to suppress civil society actors, which includes limiting access to aid and obstructing the arrival of relief. The fear is that more arrests could impact the many poor people who rely on these soup kitchens for survival. On 1 October 2024, the Al-Bara' ibn Malik Battalion, an Islamist-affiliated militia allied with the SAF, of killing 70 youth soup kitchen volunteers in Halfaya, Khartoum Bahri, for allegedly collaborating with the RSF.

In addition to arrests, there have been reports of kidnapping, torture, and even execution of activists. These actions are believed to be part of a strategy to control humanitarian aid, with warring parties profiteering off this control. The result is an exacerbation of the food crisis in Sudan, where millions are dealing with acute levels of hunger.

The targeting of activists is not limited to those involved in food aid. Human rights defenders, journalists, and student activists have also been harassed, arrested, and tortured. Their supporters, friends, and families have also been targeted.

=== Targeting of journalists ===
Media organizations accused both the SAF and the RSF of threatening, attacking and even killing several journalists during the conflict, with the Sudanese Journalists Syndicate documenting more than 40 such violations during the second half of May 2023 alone. Aside from the occupation of state media channels, the RSF raided the offices of the newspapers El Hirak El Siyasi, El Madaniya and the Sudanese Communist Party's El Midan and shot and injured photojournalists Faiz Abubakr, and Ali Shata, while the SAF was accused of circulating lists of journalists it claimed supported the RSF.

BBC journalist Mohamed Othman was reportedly attacked and beaten in Khartoum while a correspondent and cameramen for the El Sharg news outlet were detained for hours near Merowe airport on the first day of the fighting on 15 April 2023. On 16 June 2023, Al Jazeera journalists Osama Sayed Ahmed and Ahmed El Buseili were shot by snipers in Khartoum, while the RSF detained two of the channel's other reporters, Ahmed Fadl and Rashid Gibril, in Khartoum on 16 May, and subsequently looted Fadl's residence. During a live report on 29 April, al-Arabiya correspondent Salem Mahmoud was interrupted and questioned by the RSF. On 30 June, Radio Zalingei journalist Samaher Abdelshafee was killed by shelling at Hasaheisa refugee camp near Zalingei, where she and her family had fled after fighting in the city. Sudan TV photographer Esam Marajan was shot dead inside his home in the Beit El Mal neighbourhood of Omdurman in the first week of August. Sports photojournalist Esam El Haj was killed during clashes around the Al-Shajara garrison in Khartoum on 20 August 2023. Halima Idris Salim, a reporter for Sudan Bukra was killed on 10 October 2023 after she was reportedly struck by an RSF vehicle while covering the fighting in Omdurman.

The Sudanese Journalists Syndicate (SJS) reported on 10 August 2023 that 13 newspapers had ceased operations due to the conflict, while FM radio stations and channels also halted broadcasts, with journalists grappling with unpaid wages. It later reported in December 2023 that the RSF had turned the premises of the Sudan Broadcasting Corporation (SBC) into a detention centre and was involved in the looting of other media outlets, including the BBC's Khartoum branch, and the sale of media equipment, including that of the SBC, in markets in Omdurman.

Intermittent telecommunications and internet since the beginning of the conflict, and in particular a near total blackout in February and March 2024 severely limited reporting in and from Sudan. The RSF is reportedly selling access to Starlink to get around the blackout, which allegedly allows them to track journalists. In April 2024, the government suspended the licenses of three foreign media outlets (UAE-based Sky News Arabia, Saudi-based Al Arabiya and Al Hadath), while the editor of the now-closed Al-Sudani said that 23 local print outlets had shut down. Casualties in 2024 include Khalid Balal (a media director), who was fatally shot at his home in North Darfur on 1 March, as well as many journalists who were beaten. Harassment, including sexual harassment, and detention were also reported, including the editor-in-chief of al-Maidan, a local news outlet, who is under RSF custody as of April 2024.

On 21 March 2025, an RSF drone strike on the Republican Palace in Khartoum killed six journalists including two military reporters and four members of a Sudan TV crew. On 26 October 2025, after the RSF captured El Fasher, Al Jazeera English journalist Muammar Ibrahim was detained and kept in custody since then in Nyala, South Darfur.

== Abduction of children ==
In January 2026 Reuters reported that RSF fighters and allied militias had abducted children in Darfur since 2023, including during the capture of El Fasher in October 2025. Based on interviews with 26 witnesses, the agency documented 23 incidents involving at least 56 children aged between two months and 17 years, often taken after their parents had been killed. Reuters could not independently verify the accounts or establish what happened to the children. In four accounts, fighters told families the children would be used as slaves to herd livestock, and seven witnesses said the fighters referred to the children as "falungiat", a derogatory term roughly meaning children of house slaves. The abductions could amount to war crimes and crimes against humanity; they could also constitute enslavement and slave trading.

== Forced recruitment and use of child soldiers ==
There are increasing reports of children being recruited into armed groups. Observers accused the RSF of recruiting children as young as 14 to fight against the SAF using money and "false pretences", with some of them reportedly seen on the frontline in Khartoum. The Associated Press reported that Colombian mercenaries helped train and control child soldiers for the RSF. Sky News Arabia reported, in 2024, on SAF conscription of hundred of children between the age of 12 and 14 at a military camp near Shendi, River Nile State as part of the Popular Resistance of Sudan.

Since the outbreak of the war in April 2023, the RSF has intensified forced recruitment campaigns in areas under its control, especially in Darfur, Kordofan, and Gezira State, and has often targeted men and boys through abductions, coercion, and threats. Reports have described people being taken from homes, villages, and camps for internally displaced persons and forced into combat or support roles under threat of execution or torture. Those who refused recruitment or tried to escape faced killings, torture, enforced disappearance, and other reprisals, while communities associated with them were also subjected to looting, torching, sexual violence, and forced displacement. Young males, displaced persons, and people in RSF-held areas were considered especially vulnerable.

== Reaction and investigation ==
Both the SAF and the RSF are accused of committing war crimes, with the RSF being singled out by the Human Rights Watch, and the United Kingdom and United States governments for committing crimes against humanity.

On 13 July 2023, the office of the International Criminal Court's Chief Prosecutor Karim Ahmad Khan said that it had launched investigations into possible war crimes and crimes against humanity committed during the course of the 2023 conflict, within the context of its Darfur investigation, which started in 2005 based on United Nations Security Council Resolution 1593. The United Nations Security Council (UNSC) resolution limits the investigation to Darfur. On 5 September, UN Special Adviser on the Prevention of Genocide Alice Wairimu Nderitu acknowledged that the conflict and related abuses had "strong identity-based components." In an interview by the BBC, Burhan said that he would cooperate with the ICC to bring those responsible to justice. In his report to the UNSC on 29 January 202, he expressed that there are "reasonable grounds to believe" that crimes outlined in the "Rome Statute" are currently taking place in the "unstable western region".

On 3 August 2023, Amnesty International released its report on the conflict. Titled Death Came To Our Home: War Crimes and Civilian Suffering In Sudan, it documented "mass civilian casualties in both deliberate and indiscriminate attacks" by both the SAF and the RSF, particularly in Khartoum and West Darfur. It also detailed sexual violence against women and girls as young as 12, targeted attacks on civilian facilities such as hospitals and churches, and looting.

On 6 September 2023, the US State Department and the US Treasury imposed sanctions on the RSF's deputy commander and Hemedti's brother Abdelrahim Dagalo, and Abdel Rahman Jumma, the RSF's top commander in West Darfur, over "extensive" human rights violations during the conflict, with Jumma in particular being accused of masterminding the assassination of the state's governor Khamis Abakar in June. Antony Blinken, United States Secretary of State, accused the RSF of ethnic cleansing in December 2023.

The SAF accused the RSF of perpetrating war crimes. On 4 August, General Abdel Fattah al-Burhan, as chair of the Transitional Sovereignty Council, established a committee tasked with investigating war crimes, human rights violations, and other crimes attributed to the RSF. The committee was to be chaired by a representative of the Attorney General, and also included officials from the Foreign and Justice Ministries, the SAF, the Police, the General Intelligence Service, and the National Commission for Human Rights. During his speech to the UN General Assembly in New York in September, al-Burhan called for the international community to designate the RSF as a "terrorist group".

In September 2023, the United States, Britain, Norway, and Germany planned to propose a motion to the UN Human Rights Council for an investigation into the alleged atrocities in Sudan. The draft motion, which condemns the human rights violations during the conflict, aimed to establish a three-person Fact Finding Mission to investigate these allegations. The experts would document the violations and provide updates to the 47-member Council. The draft has been circulated among member countries but has not yet been formally submitted to the Council. On 11 October, the United Nations Human Rights Council voted 19–16 with 12 abstentions to adopt a resolution creating a fact-finding committee on crimes and violations in Sudan since the start of the conflict.

Human Rights Watch has called for robust measures to address the ongoing atrocities, urging the United States to take action at the UN Security Council to protect civilians and hold those responsible for the violence accountable. The United Nations Integrated Transition Assistance Mission in Sudan (UNITAMS) has expressed grave concern over the targeting of civilians and public facilities by the RSF and allied militias, and the need for urgent action to ensure the safety and protection of civilians in Darfur.

Early March 2024, the UN Panel of Experts on Sudan, mandated by Resolution 2620 (2022) of the UN Security Council, published their latest report. It described the wide-ranging devastation and violence in the country, caused in many cases by the RSF and associated militias. With regard to war crimes in West Darfur, the report estimated the death rate through ethnic cleansing of the Masalit community in El Geneina between 10,000 and 15,000. In her speech before the Security Council Committee, Ambassador Linda Thomas-Greenfield, the US Representative to the United Nations, commented: "It is my hope that the sobering report will at long last shake the world from its indifference to the horrors playing out before our eyes."

In April 2024, the Raoul Wallenberg Centre for Human Rights released a report into breaches of the Genocide Convention in Darfur. The independent report found that there is "clear and convincing evidence" that the RSF and its allied militias "have committed and are committing genocide against the Masalit," a non-Arab ethnic group, and that all 153 states that have signed the Genocide Convention are "obligated to end complicity in and employ all means reasonably available to prevent and halt the genocide." It goes on to say that there is "clear and convincing evidence" that Sudan, the United Arab Emirates, Libya, Chad, the Central African Republic (CAR) and Russia via the actions of the Wagner Group are "complicit in the genocide."

In January 2025, the U.S. government has officially accused the RSF for committing genocide, imposing sanctions on the group's leader, Hemedti and asset freezes and a travel ban.

In April 2025, a UN panel of experts opened an investigation into how the RSF militia fighters acquired mortar rounds that were exported from Bulgaria to the UAE. In November 2024, a convoy was caught in North Darfur region carrying mortar rounds that were seized. The munitions had same serial numbers as the 81mm mortar rounds exported by Bulgaria to the UAE military in 2019. As per Bulgaria’s foreign affairs ministry, the UAE had no license to re-export the mortar rounds to another country.

On July 11, 2025, the ICC reported to the United Nations Security Council that war crimes and crimes against humanity are currently being committed in Sudan's Darfur region amid the ongoing conflict. The ICC documented widespread atrocities, including rape, ethnic cleansing, bombings, massacres, abductions, and deliberate starvation, primarily targeting non‑Arab civilians. Impacts include devastating strikes on displacement camps, hospitals, and aid workers, and a severe humanitarian crisis with over 30 million people in need amid blocked access and looted resources. The ICC called for urgent investigations and international action to prevent further mass atrocities.

== See also ==
- Darfur genocide (2023–present)
- 21st-century genocides#Sudan (2023)
- List of massacres in Sudan
- International Criminal Court investigation in Darfur
