= Angry Without Borders =

Revolutionary group in Sudan (2020–present)

- غاضبون بلا حدود
- AWB insignia
- Abbreviation: AWB
- Formation: 2020
- Founder: Ahmed al-Bushra
- Founded at: Khartoum State, Sudan
- Purpose: Pro-democracy; Anti-military junta
- Region served: Sudan
- Notable people: Hossam al-Sayyad; Sharaf Abu Al-Majd †; Mazen Yousif †
- Affiliations: Resistance committees; Popular Resistance; Emergency Response Rooms
- Website: Facebook
- Motto: Arrest; Injury; Martyrdom; (Arabic: إعتقال . إصابه . شهادة)

Angry Without Borders (Arabic: غاضبون بلا حدود, romanized: Ghāḍibūn bi-lā ḥudūd), also known as Infinitely Angry, is a revolutionary youth group in Sudan, emerging from Sudanese resistance committees pivotal in the 2019 revolution against Omar al-Bashir. Formed by young activists aged 17 to 24, they were disillusioned by the slow political changes and continued military influence. The group became known for confronting security forces during protests and resisting the Transitional Military Council and the October 2021 coup, advocating for a civilian-led transition.

Since the Sudanese civil war began on 15 April 2023, the group has taken up arms alongside the Sudanese Armed Forces (SAF) against the Rapid Support Forces (RSF), as part of the Popular Resistance. This alignment with the SAF has been controversial, with accusations of legitimising military rule. However, members defend this as a tactical alliance to protect civilians from RSF atrocities.

The group also engages in humanitarian efforts, providing food, water, and medical supplies to communities and maintaining essential infrastructure during the conflict, as part of the Emergency Response Rooms.

== History ==
=== Formation and purpose ===
Angry Without Borders is a revolutionary youth group in Sudan, emerged from the Sudanese resistance committees that played a significant role in the 2019 revolution. These committees were instrumental in organising protests and civil disobedience against the regime of Omar al-Bashir, which eventually led to his ousting. The group was formed by young activists, aged between 17 and 24, who were disillusioned with the slow pace of political change and the continued military influence in Sudanese politics.

Angry Without Borders, founded in 2020 by Ahmed al-Bushra, and was known for confronting the security and police forces on the front lines of the demonstrations. It then continued to resist against the Transitional Military Council, as well as after the October 2021 coup. The group is known for its firm stance against political forces participating in transitional governments, emphasising a purely civilian-led transition.

The group has been heavily involved in organising protests against the ruling military authorities. These protests have often resulted in violent clashes with security forces. For instance, during protests, members of Angry Without Borders have been known to clash with security forces using stones and by returning tear gas bombs. The group's activities have led to severe repression by the authorities and the group was sometimes directly targeted by the authorities. For example, at least nine protesters were killed in one of the demonstrations organised by Angry Without Borders.

In 2023, Angry Without Borders launched an online campaign to expose police abuses and the security forces targeting of journalist and photographers.

=== Role in the Sudanese civil war ===
Since the outbreak of the Sudanese civil war on 15 April 2023, Angry Without Borders has been actively involved in the conflict. The group has taken up arms alongside the Sudanese Armed Forces (SAF) to fight against the Rapid Support Forces (RSF), as part of the Popular Resistance of Sudan. Despite their alignment with the SAF, members of Angry Without Borders have maintained that their primary goal is to protect civilians and resist the RSF's aggression.

The group's decision to fight alongside the SAF has been controversial. In April 2024, leaders of Angry Without Borders met with Abdel Fattah al-Burhan, the chief of the SAF and Sudan's de facto ruler. This meeting sparked a heated debate on social media, with many accusing the group of legitimising military rule in Sudan. However, members of Angry Without Borders have defended their actions, stating that their alliance with the SAF is purely tactical and aimed at defending civilians from RSF atrocities.

As the conflict in Sudan continues, Angry Without Borders remains a key player in the resistance against the RSF. The group faces significant challenges, including the risk of being targeted by both the RSF and elements within the SAF who view them as a threat to their power as Angry Without Borders continues to advocate for a democratic Sudan free from military rule.

Beyond their military involvement, Angry Without Borders has also been active in providing humanitarian aid. The group has organised efforts to deliver food, water, and medical supplies to communities affected by the conflict. They have also been involved in maintaining essential infrastructure, such as water and communication networks, to ensure that civilians have access to basic services.
