= Impact of the Sudanese civil war =

Impact of the Sudanese civil war may refer to:

- Impact of the First Sudanese Civil War
- Impact of the Second Sudanese Civil War
- Impact of the Sudanese civil war (2023–present)
