= Humanitarian impact of the Sudanese civil war (2023–present) =

The Sudanese civil war that began in April 2023 has produced a severe humanitarian crisis. The conflict is fought between the Sudanese Armed Forces (SAF) and the Rapid Support Forces (RSF). Ten days into the fighting, communities faced severe shortages of food, water, medical supplies and fuel, with Khartoum and its surroundings hit hardest. Within the first months of the war, about 25 million people out of a population of roughly 50 million required humanitarian assistance. The World Food Programme struggled to deliver aid as large quantities were looted. By September 2024, roughly 80% of healthcare facilities in Sudan were no longer functional. The conflict has caused nearly 12 million people to be forcibly displaced, both inside Sudan and across its borders, making it one of the largest displacement crises in recent history. In April 2025, the famine in Sudan had severely affected nearly 25 million people, and almost 4 million children under five were acutely malnourished. By September 2025, the number of people requiring humanitarian aid had increased to 30.4 million. The fatality numbers are highly uncertain, with some assessments suggesting the true number may exceed 150,000.

International aid agencies have expressed concerns about the scale and severity of the crisis in Sudan. In August 2024, Médecins Sans Frontières said that "international humanitarian organizations and donors" had failed to address "the country's escalating medical needs, from catastrophic child malnutrition to widespread disease outbreaks." According to a UN representative, the conflict has pushed Sudan into the world’s worst humanitarian crisis. Observers called for an increase of humanitarian aid, the enforcement of international law to protect humanitarian workers, the establishment of clear pathways for refugees to seek safety, as well as halting the delivery of weapons to the RSF by the United Arab Emirates. By January 2026, it was estimated that 70% of the population was urgently in need of assistance.

== Regional impacts ==
=== Khartoum ===
At the outset of the war, intense heat, drought and the timing of the clashes during the final days of Ramadan worsened living conditions. Many people were unable to leave their homes to obtain food or supplies because of the risk of crossfire. Hospitals were under severe strain from the beginning as wounded civilians arrived while medical teams struggled with staffing shortages and dwindling stocks of essential materials.

On 17 April, the Sudan Medical Association said that bombs struck al-Shaab Hospital and al-Khartoum Hospital, forcing both hospitals to stop the services of their emergency departments. Dozens of hospitals in Khartoum were forced out of service through bombings, evacuations and seizures by the warring parties. At least five ambulance crews were attacked while on duty. The association described the attacks as a clear violation of international humanitarian law and called on the international community to help. The World Health Organization (WHO) said that the warring sides seized ambulances. The vice president of the Sudan Doctors' Trade Union told Al Jazeera that doctors and other healthcare personnel were finding it very difficult to reach hospitals because the major bridges on the Nile were blockaded.

Residents were asked to limit their electricity usage as the state's distribution authority said the servers that manage online purchases of power were out of service and engineers could not reach them because it was too dangerous. Two water plants were reportedly damaged in the fighting, forcing residents to collect water directly from the Nile River instead. A grassroots movement using the hashtag #NoToWar offered people food, medication and information about safety routes to escape the city.

On 28 April 2023, Volker Türk, the UN High Commissioner for Human Rights accused the RSF of evicting people from their residences during the fighting in Khartoum. The RSF was also accused of harassing pro-democracy artists during the conflict.

On 20 May 2025, the SAF took full control over Ombadda and the rest of Omdurman, bringing an end to fighting in the Khartoum State.

=== Darfur ===
The governor of North Darfur called the humanitarian situation in the region dire. The Project Coordinator for Médecins Sans Frontières (MSF) in the state's capital El-Fasher said that the only remaining hospital in North Darfur was "rapidly running out of medical supplies to treat survivors" while other hospitals have had to close due to their proximity to the fighting or the inability of staff to get to the facilities because of the violence. MSF said that its compound in Nyala, South Darfur, had been raided by armed men who "stole everything including vehicles and office equipment".

Save the Children said that the charity's compound in Darfur was looted by armed men, saying staff were not hurt but medical supplies were taken, as well as food and laptops. Islamic Relief's office in Central Darfur was looted by armed men, and cars were stolen. The World Food Programme reported the deaths of three of its employees and the looting of its facilities and vehicles during clashes at Kabkabiya, North Darfur. United Nations Under-Secretary-General for Humanitarian Affairs and Emergency Relief Coordinator Martin Griffiths said that they were "receiving reports of attacks and sexual violence against aid workers", adding that the UN aid office in South Darfur was looted on 17 April. A car carrying employees of the Norwegian Refugee Council was attacked in El-Fasher on 20 April but there were no injuries. A hospital supported by MSF in Geneina was looted during fighting on 26–28 April. On 3 May, Griffiths said that six trucks belonging to the World Food Programme were looted in Darfur. In June, the Sudanese Health Ministry said all hospitals in West Darfur had been closed due to the fighting.

==== Siege of El Fasher ====
The Siege of El Fasher was an 18-month blockade of the city of El Fasher in North Darfur by the Rapid Support Forces (RSF), lasting from 13 April 2024 to 26 October 2025. At least 600,000 people fled El Fasher and nearby camps during the siege, yet around 260,000 civilians, about half of them children, remained in the city in extremely harsh conditions without humanitarian access. An estimated 6,000 children suffering from severe acute malnutrition were at risk of dying.

On 1 August 2024, the Integrated Food Security Phase Classification (IPC) Famine Review Committee (FRC) concluded that IPC Phase 5 famine conditions are prevalent and ongoing in parts of North Darfur, including the Zamzam camp south of El Fasher. The committee also warned that there was a high risk of similar conditions throughout internally displaced persons camps.

Between July and October 2025, the humanitarian situation in El Fasher reached catastrophic levels as the prolonged siege tightened and civilian suffering escalated. In late July, the World Food Programme (WFP) reported that although it was attempting to deliver aid to those trapped in the city, shrinking funding, impassable roads due to seasonal flooding and security constraints made operations increasingly untenable. Food‑prices continued their sharp rise: by late September a kilogram of rice in El Fasher had risen to 500,000 Sudanese pounds, meat to 100,000 pounds per kilo, and sugar reached 70,000 pounds per pound — in a city of approximately 250,000 civilians at risk of starvation.

In early September, volunteers managed to distribute food to around 90 displaced families, but these small efforts fell far short of the need. Women, children and older people were among the hardest hit. Hospitals in the city were operating under near‑impossible conditions: the blockade severed supply routes for medicine and equipment, malnutrition among children and pregnant women soared, and disease such as cholera and malaria proliferated in the camps and city wards.

The siege ended on 26 October 2025 with the El Fasher massacre, during which more than 2,000 people were executed, including many children, women, and older people.

== Famine ==
Before the current conflict, Sudan was already struggling with high levels of malnutrition, food insecurity and poor access to safe water and basic services. The war has made these problems far worse and pushed a much larger share of the population into severe hardship. Widespread violence severely disrupted food systems across Sudan. Markets and food-processing facilities were destroyed by explosive weapons and arson, and large-scale looting targeted markets, food aid and livestock. Civilians were attacked in and around marketplaces and on routes used to access them. Blockades cut supply chains and hindered the delivery of humanitarian food assistance, while insecurity prevented access to agricultural land. The combination of prolonged violence and severe restrictions on humanitarian operations contributed directly to the emergence of famine conditions in several areas of Sudan in 2024.

In June 2024, UN experts stated that both the SAF and the RSF were deliberately withholding food and contributing to civilian starvation. The UN urged an end to the use of starvation as a method of warfare. In April 2025, the famine in Sudan had severely affected nearly 25 million people – about half of the country's population. Nearly four million children under five were acutely malnourished.

== Water, sanitation and hygiene ==
Even before the war, access to safe water and sanitation in Sudan was extremely limited. Around 17 million people lacked basic drinking water services and roughly 24 million had no adequate sanitation, with more than 10 million practising open defecation. Conditions were particularly poor in states such as Blue Nile and White Nile, where fewer than half of households had safe water, and in parts of Darfur, Kassala and Kordofan, where shortages and uneven coverage left many communities without reliable sources. Internally displaced people faced especially severe shortages, with limited access to safe water in many displacement sites.

By the end of August 2024, heavy rains and flooding during that year's rainy season had affected an estimated 317,000 people nationwide, displacing more than 118,000 from their homes. Nearly 27,000 houses were destroyed and over 31,000 more were damaged, along with thousands of latrines, severely disrupting access to safe water and sanitation. Flooding also struck displacement sites, and in North Darfur more than 4,000 people were forced to flee camps after rising waters destroyed around 900 tents and washed away sanitation facilities. In rural and underdeveloped areas, including parts of Blue Nile, Kassala and White Nile states, residents were often required to walk through floodwaters, greatly increasing exposure to waterborne diseases.

== Ethnic cleansing ==
During the conflict, the Rapid Support Forces (RSF) and allied Arab militias carried out systematic campaigns of ethnic cleansing across Darfur, beginning with large-scale attacks on non-Arab communities in West Darfur in 2023 and in 2024. Further mass killings took place in 2025 during the siege of El Fasher, where repeated assaults on the Zamzam and Abu Shouk IDP camps and on surrounding non-Arab neighbourhoods resulted in mass casualties. After the fall of the city in October 2025, tens of thousands of people, mostly non-Arab civilians and particularly the Zaghawa people, were killed in the El Fasher massacre. Similar ethnically driven attacks were reported in villages around Tawila and Kutum and in other rural parts of Darfur, as well as in areas of Kordofan and in parts of central Sudan. Accusations of genocide have additionally been made regarding the wanton massacres of civilians in villages in Gezira State and states around the White Nile.

Large-scale, targeted violence was directed at the Masalit people in West Darfur, described as genocide by Genocide Watch, the United States, and others. Beginning in 2023, the RSF and allied Arab militias carried out coordinated attacks on Masalit communities in and around Geneina, including the massacres in Ardamata, Misterei and other towns. UN and survivor accounts reported mass killings, the burning of neighbourhoods and markets, and widespread targeting of men and boys to eliminate Masalit lineage, with attacks specifically directed at Masalit and other dark-skinned inhabitants of Darfur rather than Sudanese Arabs. Witnesses described Arab fighters going house to house, killing darker-skinned Masalit civilians while shouting “Kill the slave, kill the slave!”.

A UN Security Council estimate suggested that 10,000–15,000 people were killed in El Geneina alone. Additional killings occurred on roads leading to the Chadian border, many of them carried out at RSF checkpoints. In the November 2023 Ardamata massacre, RSF and Janjaweed fighters killed between 800 and 2,000 people, mostly Masalit but also other non-Arab groups, displacing around 20,000 civilians to Chad.

Apart from ethnic cleansing, numerous accounts also described civilians being killed indiscriminately and prisoners of war being subjected to torture.

== Healthcare and disease burden ==
Before the war, Sudan's health system was severely underfunded and fragmented, marked by acute shortages of medical staff, vast inequalities in access and quality of care, and a reliance on out-of-pocket payments by nearly the entire population. Despite these weaknesses, Sudan had made important gains in controlling infectious diseases such as malaria, cholera and measles, following years of sustained work by national authorities and international health partners. Much of this progress has been quickly reversed as a result of the conflict.

The ongoing war devastated Sudan's already fragile health system, crippling service delivery and staffing. In April 2023, hospitals were overwhelmed as wounded people arrived in large numbers, with doctors' groups reporting severe staff shortages and dwindling medical supplies. In May that year, the World Health Organization (WHO) had recorded around 26 attacks on healthcare facilities, some of which resulted in casualties among medical workers and civilians. By June 2023, about half of Khartoum's 130 medical facilities and all hospitals in West Darfur were out of service. By late 2023, about 70% of healthcare facilities in conflict zones had shut down, and by September 2024 roughly 80% of facilities nationwide were no longer functional. Direct assaults on healthcare were aggravated by armed actors occupying treatment centres and by the looting of medical facilities. Many health workers had been killed or displaced, medical supplies had run out, and the few hospitals still functioning faced power cuts and severe logistical difficulties. Facilities in areas less affected by fighting are overwhelmed by large numbers of internally displaced people.

The health system, described as being on the verge of collapse, left nearly two thirds of the population without medical care and gravely undermined the country's capacity to respond to disease outbreaks. Besides the large number of people wounded in the conflict, Sudan was also experiencing extensive outbreaks of infectious diseases, which added to the strain on the health system. Cases of cholera, malaria, measles, polio and dengue fever had risen sharply. Overcrowded refugee camps with inadequate sanitation and scarce resources have contributed to the spread of disease, a situation worsened by interruptions to vaccination programmes and seasonal rains. Disease outbreaks in refugee camps led to the deaths of more than 1,200 children in during the first months of the war in 2023.

The collapse of sanitation and waste management services has further worsened conditions. According to the World Health Organization, many areas now lack clean water and basic hygiene facilities, heightening the risk of infectious disease. In Khartoum, reports of thousands of unburied bodies have raised fears of epidemic outbreaks, while diseases spread in the aftermath of the fighting.

=== Cholera ===
Cholera is a disease resulting from a bacterial infection and most often transmitted through polluted water. The illness leads to intense diarrhoea and rapid loss of fluids. Without timely treatment it can be fatal within a few hours, even in people who were in good health beforehand. In August 2024 cholera was declared an epidemic in Sudan and as of 8 September 2024, there were 5,692 cases of cholera including 185 deaths. A little over a year later, Sudan's Federal Ministry of Health recorded 120,496 cholera cases and 3,368 deaths nationwide. By November 2025, Sudan had recorded 124,269 suspected cholera cases and 3,355 deaths. Cholera outbreaks had spread to almost every state in Sudan, reflecting the sharp decline in the country’s public health infrastructure.

=== Malaria ===
Historically, malaria posed a serious public health challenge in Sudan. Around three quarters of the population were considered at risk, and the country's unstable pattern of transmission made nationwide outbreaks possible, especially following heavy rains or flooding, or when control measures were disrupted. In 2000, malaria was the leading cause of death in Sudan, accounting for 19% of all fatalities. In the 21st century, amidst global initiatives to control or eradicate malaria, Sudan made substantial progress in bringing malaria under control. Malaria dropped from the leading cause of death in the country in 2000 to fifth place in 2010 and eighth place in 2021. (Note: Three different sources for the three different years, so not fully comparable. Furthermore, in 2011, Sudan was split into Sudan and South Sudan.)

Since the outbreak of war in 2023, Sudan's health care system has been on the verge of collapse, and an exceptionally large wave of mass displacement has left internally displaced populations facing an especially high risk of malaria. Malaria had begun spreading rapidly again, especially in regions where displaced people had settled. The temporary camps where many sought refuge often lacked essential infrastructure such as proper shelter, sanitation, and mosquito control. During the rainy seasons, the conditions worsened, creating extensive mosquito breeding sites and sharply raising the risk of infection. Already in 2023, both the incidence of malaria and the mortality rate rose sharply. In October 2025, the WHO reported over 100,000 malaria cases across the country, an increase attributed to ongoing flooding.

=== Measles ===
Even before the war, measles vaccination coverage in Sudan was low, as years of conflict and chronic underdevelopment had left about 4.1 million vulnerable children exposed to measles and other preventable diseases. The civil war that began in 2023 severely disrupted Sudan's immunization system. Vaccination coverage fell sharply from 75% in 2022 to 57% in 2023, leaving an estimated 701,000 children unvaccinated and highly vulnerable, most of them in regions severely affected by conflict, displacement, and food insecurity.

Measles outbreaks became frequent, particularly in areas hosting displaced populations. The first confirmed measles outbreak was reported in March 2023, followed by another in April 2024. A prolonged epidemic then persisted from June 2024 to May 2025. In April 2025, a major flare-up in West Darfur showed that transmission was still widespread in remote areas where surveillance and healthcare had largely collapsed. With limited access to healthcare, many cases went unreported and untreated, worsening the overall health crisis.

=== Dengue fever ===
Dengue fever became a major public health threat in Sudan during the civil war, spreading widely as heavy rains and the collapse of sanitation systems created ideal breeding grounds for mosquitoes. By September 2025, the Ministry of Health reported more than 2,000 confirmed cases in a single week, most of them in Khartoum, while officials estimated that tens of thousands of people had likely fallen ill across the country. The rainy season left stagnant water throughout urban areas, and fighting in the capital had destroyed water and power infrastructure, forcing residents to store water at home and increasing mosquito exposure. Insect-control programmes were largely halted after systems for spraying insecticides were damaged during the war.

=== Polio ===
After a polio-free period that began in 2009, Sudan reported 58 polio cases across 18 states in 2022, along with detections of vaccine-derived poliovirus in West Darfur and in wastewater from the Red Sea State. In 2024, several polio vaccination drives were carried out across Sudan, reaching a combined total of about 5.7 million children. Still, the ongoing conflict has severely disrupted immunisation services, reducing routine coverage from 85% to about 50% nationwide and to roughly 30% in conflict areas (as of January 2025). Many localities have become inaccessible, leaving large numbers of children at heightened risk of polio.

== Displacement ==
Since fighting began in mid-April 2023, the conflict has forced more than 11.7 million people from their homes. As of November 2025, this includes around 7.26 million people displaced within Sudan and more than 270,000 refugees in Sudan who have had to relocate again. A further 4.25 million people have crossed into neighbouring countries or returned to their states of origin under difficult conditions, including 3.39 million newly arrived refugees and asylum seekers and about 851,000 refugee returnees. Those fleeing Sudan have primarily moved toward the Central African Republic, Chad, Egypt, Ethiopia, Libya, South Sudan and Uganda. Many others have moved to different locations within Sudan to seek safety.

== Impact on civilians ==
Indiscriminate attacks on civilians have become a prominent aspect of the conflict, with reports of widespread killings, sexual violence, ethnically motivated assaults, forced displacement and arbitrary detentions.

=== Populations at highest risk ===
Humanitarian needs are widespread across Sudan, but three groups face particularly severe conditions.

- The first consists of people living in areas of intense fighting, especially in Greater Darfur and Greater Kordofan, where civilians trapped in conflict zones face grave risks to their lives, health and dignity.
- The second group includes 4.8 million people who have fled to neighbouring countries and nearly eight million who remain displaced inside Sudan, many of whom have been uprooted multiple times as front lines shift and are hosted in communities where basic services are already very limited.
- The third group is made up of more than 2.2 million people recorded as returnees in 2025, mainly in Khartoum and Al-Jazira, who have gone back to areas heavily damaged by conflict, with almost no functioning services and widespread contamination by explosive remnants of war.

=== Children ===
After two years of conflict, UNICEF reported that children were among those suffering the most. The number of children needing humanitarian aid had risen sharply. By April 2025 more than 6.5 million had been displaced, some of them multiple times, forming the world’s largest child displacement crisis. Many children experienced violence, trauma and insecurity, with the situation especially grave in areas exposed to direct fighting. Even before the war, Sudan had some of the highest child malnutrition rates globally. Once the fighting began, conditions worsened with widespread outbreaks of diseases such as cholera, measles, malaria, and diarrhoea, alongside falling immunisation coverage and limited access to safe water.

Even before the conflict, about seven million children, roughly one in three, already lacked access to quality education or were dropping out. The war caused major disruption to schooling, leading to the number of children being out of school in Sudan to rise from seven million prior to the fighting to 19 million in October 2023. Attacks on schools, the use of school buildings as shelters for displaced families, and the forced displacement of children have prevented millions from accessing education. By January 2026, almost half of school-aged children in Sudan had gone almost 500 days since attending school, representing what Save the Children called "one of the world’s longest school closures, surpassing the worst shutdowns during the COVID-19 pandemic."

In March 2025, UNICEF also reported that sexual violence against children had escalated sharply during the conflict, with service providers documenting 221 cases of child rape since 2024. The true number was believed to be far higher, since many survivors could not come forward due to stigma, lack of access to services and fear of retaliation. Girls made up the majority of reported cases, though a significant number of boys had also been affected, and some survivors were infants. Incidents had been recorded across multiple states, and additional cases of attempted rape and other forms of sexual assault had been reported. The violence, and the fear of it, had forced many women and girls to flee their homes, often into displacement sites where risks remained high.

Children are also at an increased risk to be sold into slavery and trafficked for child marriage and sexual exploitation.

==== Child soldiers ====
Children are in danger of being recruited as child soldiers. In July 2026, the Associated Press interviewed six former child soldiers who said they had been abducted and forced to fight for the RSF. Two said that Colombian mercenaries had trained them to operate anti-aircraft guns, heavy artillery and drones, while others described being beaten, shackled to weapons and threatened with death if they tried to escape. The AP said that it could not independently verify the boys’ accounts, although they were consistent with other reporting on the conflict. A former RSF fighter and a Sudanese military officer also reported separately that Colombians had trained children. Sudan’s National Council for Child Welfare estimated that tens of thousands of children, some as young as eight, had been recruited during the war. The UN said that all sides to the conflict had used child soldiers.

=== Women ===
Multiple sources, including UN reporting and testimonies from asylum seekers, describe widespread sexual violence against women during the conflict, including abduction, rape and other forms of gender-based abuse, largely attributed to RSF fighters. The Sudan war "is actually a war on women," said Deepmala Mahla, Chief Humanitarian Officer at CARE International. By September 2024, 6.7 million women were at risk of gender-based violence.

As of April 2025, women were among those most severely affected by the conflict in Sudan. They made up more than half of all displaced people, with at least 5.8 million women and girls uprooted within the country. Reports indicated that women and girls in Sudan had been subjected to widespread and systematic sexual violence during the conflict. They faced high risk when carrying out basic survival tasks such as collecting water, gathering firewood or queueing for food. Incidents include gang rape, abduction, sexual slavery, trafficking and forced marriage. Some attacks involved women being raped in front of family members, or women being taken and held for extended periods for repeated sexual abuse.

Widespread economic losses left many formerly self-reliant women dependent on aid and at greater risk of gender-based violence and sexual exploitation. Women also faced acute food insecurity, partly due to social norms that often leave them eating last within households. Households headed by women in Sudan were three times more likely to face severe food insecurity than those headed by men. This is particularly serious because the death, displacement or disappearance of many men has left a growing number of women as the primary income earners. In total, 75 percent of female-headed households are unable to meet their basic food needs.

The collapse of the health system, with most hospitals in conflict areas no longer functioning, led to rising maternal deaths and left many women without access to basic healthcare and essential hygiene supplies. An estimated 80 percent of displaced women were unable to obtain safe drinking water due to cost barriers and security risks along the routes. Although women played key roles in community protection and humanitarian response, they continued to be excluded from regional and international peace negotiations.

=== Men ===
The U.S. Secretary of State Antony Blinken stated in January 2025 that the RSF and allied militias had carried out systematic killings of males of all ages, including very young children, targeting them on an ethnic basis. The UN coordinator for Sudan, Denise Brown, said she had received reports of executions against "unarmed men in particular" since the RSF entered el-Fasher in October 2025. UN Human Rights reported receiving multiple videos in which RSF fighters were seen firing on unarmed men or standing near their bodies, alleging they were SAF combatants. In a reported attack in Darfur, a survivor described how Arab militia members lined up and executed men and boys from Black African ethnic groups, and tried to kill males over the age of 10.

== Obstruction of humanitarian access ==
In April 2023, humanitarian operations in Sudan were severely disrupted. The International Federation of Red Cross and Red Crescent Societies said that it was nearly impossible to provide humanitarian services around Khartoum, and warned that Sudan's health system was at risk of collapse.

That month, several humanitarian organizations, including the United Nations, Save the Children, the World Food Programme (WFP), Islamic Relief, and the Danish Refugee Council, suspended operations due to attacks on staff and facilities. For instance, an internal UN document cited by CNN reported that armed personnel, allegedly from the RSF, attacked UN and international organization staff in Khartoum, including sexual assaults, looting, abductions, and attacks on UN facilities and staff residences. Both the RSF and the Sudanese military denied responsibility and blamed each other for the incidents. WFP said that one of its aircraft had been damaged at Khartoum International Airport during an exchange of gunfire on 15 April 2023, which impacted its ability to move staff and provide assistance to people across the country. On 25 July that year, UN Humanitarian Coordinator Nkweta-Salami said attacks on humanitarian facilities had led to the death of at least 18 aid workers, more than 50 warehouses looted, 82 offices ransacked, and over 200 vehicles stolen.

Also in April 2023, the delivery of badly needed remittances from overseas migrant workers was also halted after Western Union announced it was closing all operations in Sudan until further notice.

During 2024, USAID had contributed 44% of Sudan's $1.8 billion humanitarian response, including support for local community kitchens. Since the war began in April 2023, these kitchens played a critical role in feeding those in areas unreachable by other relief organizations, but the USAID funding suspension led to the closure of 80% of them. Local groups sought alternative funding, especially during Ramadan, yet many still remain shuttered. Relief organizations faced further obstacles as both the SAF and the RSF blocked aid shipments, loot markets, and imposed bureaucratic barriers. Additionally, fighting intensified, with regions like Zamzam camp in North Darfur unable to receive aid due to shelling, exacerbating famine conditions. As a result, millions became at risk of starvation unless international support filled the void left by USAID.

As of November 2025, the international response remained heavily underfunded, with only about half of the necessary resources for the relief plan secured. Efforts were also hindered by intentional blockages and repeated attacks on aid workers and relief facilities.

== Humanitarian response ==
In Sudan, the Emergency Response Rooms (ERRs) are a community-led initiative formed by the resistance committees behind the 2019 revolution, that have played a crucial role in providing humanitarian aid during the war which began in April 2023. As of December 2024, ERRs had assisted over 11.5 million people, evacuating thousands and supplying essential resources like clean water and medical supplies.

On 30 April 2023, the Red Cross sent its first aid delivery to Sudan by air since the conflict began, ferrying eight tonnes of humanitarian cargo from Amman, Jordan to Port Sudan. The World Food Programme resumed operations on 1 May.

On 15 April 2024, donors pledged more than 2 billion euros for aid in Sudan.

On 27 December 2024, philanthropist Saad Kassis-Mohamed was reported to have raised US$100,000 to support humanitarian relief and reconstruction in Sudan during the civil war, with funds directed toward rehabilitation efforts and the rebuilding of homes in conflict-affected areas.

== International attention ==
In 2024, the crisis received limited attention in mainstream media. That same year, observers called for an increase of humanitarian aid, the enforcement of international law to protect humanitarian workers, the establishment of clear pathways for refugees to seek safety, as well as halting the delivery of weapons to the RSF by the United Arab Emirates.

A senior official from the United Nations World Food Programme warned in April 2025 that Sudan was facing the world's worst humanitarian crisis.

== See also ==
- Iranian intervention in Sudan (2023–present)
- War crimes during the Sudanese civil war (2023–present)
