= Sudanese Red Crescent =

Humanitarian organization in Sudan

Sudanese Red Crescent (SRC) جمعية الهلال الأحمر السوداني
- Founded: 1923
- Type: Non-profit
- Location: Khartoum
- Region served: Sudan
- Key people: Dr. Afaf Ahmed Yahya (Secretary General)
- Website: srcs.sd

The Sudanese Red Crescent (SRC; Arabic: جمعية الهلال الأحمر السوداني, romanized: Jamʻīyat al-Hilāl al-Aḥmar al-Sūdānī) is the biggest and most decentralized and widespread humanitarian organization operating in Sudan. The society developed out of the Sudan branch of the British Red Cross Society and was established in 1956. Upon Sudan's independence in March 1956 received official recognition as an independent National Society following the Sudanese Council of Ministers decree No. 869. The National Society covers nearly the entire country with 15 State branches and several sub-branches/units in the provinces/localities and administrative units, with a nationwide community-based network of 35,000 active volunteers and another 300,000 who can be deployed as need arises. It has well-established working relations with public authorities at federal, state and local levels, and good partnership and collaboration with Movement partners and UN specialized agencies and national and international NGOs working in Sudan.

The SRCS law has been proclaimed by the authority in June 2010, giving the National Society a strong legal base and clear mandate to run First Aid, emergency response, health interventions and other humanitarian operations. The Society is well known by the public for its humanitarian work and community service through many years of emergency relief and community-based programming, and through close collaboration with national and international organizations as well as relevant government departments.

Over the past four years, the National Society has taken significant steps to address fundamental structural and organizational change. A process of decentralization and the establishment of autonomous state branches, as well as the development of an active and participatory community-based volunteer network has been initiated to make the National Society more accessible, responsible and accountable.

Following the independence of South Sudan, the South Sudan Red Cross split from the Sudanese Red Crescent in 2011.

== Mission ==
Improve the quality of life of vulnerable groups by promotion and strengthening capacities of local communities. Strategic Core Areas The core areas could be summarized in the following:

1. Disaster preparedness and disaster response
2. Basic health care services, community health programs (commercial First Aid)
3. Promotion and integration of the Movement's Principles & humanitarian values,
4. Organizational development ( a strong constituent NS with capable branches in coordination and collaboration with all partners. Coping with the changing situation & considering crosscutting issues e.g. gender / volunteers issues, community participation.

With the support of the ICRC and other Movement Partners, in 2010–2011, the SRCS successfully managed the largest humanitarian operations it ever had in relation to the National Election and Referendum of South Sudan. The NS mobilized over 20,000 trained and equipped volunteers and 75 ambulances. In the context of the recent conflict that has broken in three Protocol Areas, in several places which has created new displacement. Access has been severely limited for many humanitarian actors, yet the SRCS has intervened through the emergency action teams and remained one of the few humanitarian agencies with thousands of trained volunteers providing relief assistance without discrimination to all affected people, with in-kind support from both RC/RC movement and External partners.

== Projects ==
Sudanese Red Crescent (SRC) implements various humanitarian programmes and projects that include but not limited to:

=== Health ===
SRC is prioritizing various health services, community health programs (health education, sanitation, awareness campaigns and community based activities (first-aid and HIV/AIDS) as well as response activities to the emerging diseases and epidemics. Drinking water and sanitation projects are also being carried out by SRCS in order to provide safe, adequate drinking water and sanitation facilities as well as taking relevant topics in health education. SRCS is using training manuals for Community Based First Aid (CBFA), Primary Health Care (PHC) and Home Nursing. Trainers are the backbone of the process. SRCS has motivated and dedicated trainers in the branches as well as the HQ, and continue to organize training of trainers workshops to maintain the required number of trainers.

=== First aid ===
Community Based Health First Aid (CBHFA) is one of the core competencies of the SRCS. Poor health services coverage (40 – 60 percent) of the population and primary health care with coverage of 10 to 30 percent demonstrates the needs in the rural level with community health care. The purpose of CBHFA in the community is to empower the communities to improve their health situation and encourage healthier and safer lifestyles through behaviour change. The volunteer trained in CBHFA is part of the community. CBHFA activities are based upon a core of knowledge and skills as well as some optional ones according to the specific health profile of the community.

=== Epidemic preparedness ===
Irregular outbreaks and high prevalence of communicable diseases such as malaria, meningitis, water related diseases, low coverage of vaccine preventable diseases demonstrate the role health promotion prevention and disease surveillance can play in the communities in Sudan. The community health volunteers receive training on prevention and control of prevailing infectious and endemic diseases in their own community. Volunteers organize their communities to identify the health problems and find possible solutions to their problems. They l coordinate with the authorities and work with the community leaders to obtain their support.

=== Mine risk reduction ===
SRC and its partners work towards mine-risk reduction through various activities that include; mine detection, mine clearance, destroying or disposing of landmines, and providing mine-risk education.

=== Tracing ===
Since its establishment, SRCS has been mandated to assist victims in time of war, and the 1949 Geneva Conventions are the main legal basis for this mandate. Tracing is carried out to locate family members who may have been separated, lost contact, taken as prisoners or gone missing as a result of wars, natural disasters, political upheavals or social problems. After being located this program enables them to reestablish contact, and if possible reunited, with their family members and relatives.

=== Disaster management ===
SRC focuses on community-based disaster preparedness, which based on the belief that the first people to respond to a disaster are those living the area. This community should be able to start rescue and relief operations on their own. Projects developed by SRCS assist communities to reduce their vulnerability to disasters and also strengthen their capability.

=== Aids program ===
The Sudanese Red Crescent is an active member of the Sudan National AIDS Control Programme (SNAP) and the Country Theme Group (CTG) as well as the Sudan Aids Network (SAN), which is a consortium of Non Governmental Organizations working on HIV/AIDS control.

In addition, the Sudanese Red Crescent has specific service agreements and works closely with the Ministry of Health and has an important and expanding role to continue to support the most vulnerable - especially youth, women and children - through the delivery of well-targeted programmes in the areas of communicable disease control, HIV/AIDS education and reproductive health.

=== Community health volunteer program ===
The objectives of the program are to address the basic health needs of the most vulnerable communities, increase awareness among the high risk groups and the community on health care, provision and first aid, reduce the number of deaths, injuries and impact from disasters, reduce the number of illnesses and impact from diseases and public health emergencies and prevention and control of water borne diseases.

=== Water and sanitation ===
This programme aims at contributing to integrated, healthy, peaceful Sudanese communities in all Sudan states by addressing the most urgent unmet humanitarian needs in the sector of water, sanitation and hygiene (WASH). The programme also works to improve the environmental health conditions through increased access to and utilization of water, sanitation and hygiene awareness rising services.
