= Blocking of humanitarian aid =

Prevention of entry into a region of basic material goods

Blocking of humanitarian aid can result in several ways. It can be imposed on a region by foreign governments or non-state actors, but it can also result from the lack of consent for assistance by the host nation. Blocking of humanitarian aid to intentionally cause destruction of part or all of a population can amount to the crime against humanity of extermination. If, however, the humanitarian aid (e.g., medical supplies, food, clothing) is systematically diverted for military use by enemy combatants during war, then allowing the passage of humanitarian aid is not required, as explained in Article 23 of the Fourth Geneva Convention. There are different interpretations of how the requirement of proportionality should determine the extent to which a siege to block such aid can legally be carried out.

== International humanitarian law ==
International humanitarian law prohibits the starvation of civilians as a method of warfare, including by wilfully impeding relief supplies. In siege situations, a party that cannot provide civilians under its control with supplies essential to survival must consent to humanitarian relief operations, and parties that have agreed relief must allow and facilitate its rapid and unimpeded passage, subject to control measures and temporary, geographically limited restrictions required by military necessity.
