= South Sudan Red Cross =

Organization

South Sudan Red Cross Society
- Founded: 9 July 2011
- Type: Non-profit organisation
- Purpose: Humanitarian Aid
- Location: South Sudan
- Affiliations: International Committee of the Red Cross; International Federation of Red Cross and Red Crescent Societies
- Website: https://www.ssdredcross.org/

The South Sudan Red Cross Society was founded in 2011. It has its headquarters in Juba.
