= Ardamata =

Neighborhood in Geneina, West Darfur, Sudan

Ardamata اردمتا
- Neighborhood
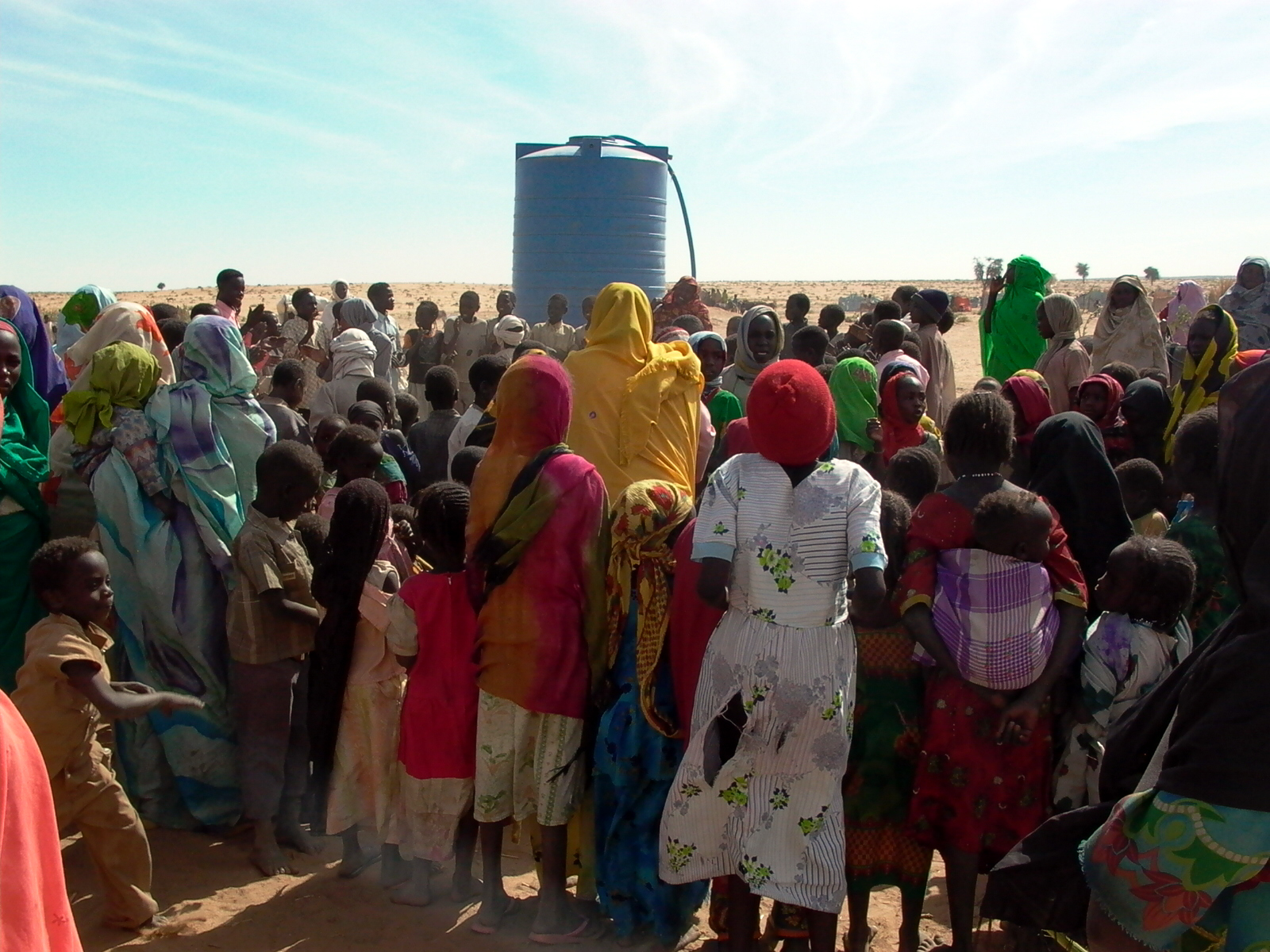
- IDP's at the Ardamata displacement camp in 2007

- Location in Sudan
- Coordinates: 13°28′32″N 22°30′15.03″E
- Country: Sudan
- State: West Darfur
- City: Geneina
- Control: Rapid Support Forces
- Time zone: Central Africa Time, GMT + 3

Ardamata (Arabic: اردمتا) is a neighborhood located in the northeastern part of Geneina, Sudan. The neighborhood is near the Sudanese Armed Forces's 15th Infantry Division camp.

== History ==
On 8 November 2023, the Janjaweed and Rapid Support Forces massacred about 800 civilians in Ardamata, West Darfur, Sudan.

== Demographics ==
The village is home to mainly ethnic Masalit residents.
