= Muammar Ibrahim (journalist) =

Sudanese freelance journalist

- معمر إبراهيم
- Occupation: Freelance journalist
- Employer: Al Jazeera English (contributor)
- Known for: Reporting from the Siege of El Fasher during the Sudanese civil war

Muammar Ibrahim (Arabic: معمر إبراهيم) is a Sudanese freelance journalist who has contributed to Al Jazeera English. He reported on the Sudanese civil war, including from El Fasher in North Darfur. In October 2025, he was detained by the Rapid Support Forces (RSF) in El Fasher while covering the conflict.

== Career ==
Ibrahim worked as a freelance journalist covering the siege of El Fasher, during the Sudanese civil war. His reporting for Al Jazeera documented the effects of the siege on civilians, including shortages of food, medicine and humanitarian assistance.

== Detention ==
On 26 October 2025, after the Rapid Support Forces (RSF) captured El Fasher, Ibrahim was detained while leaving the city. A video later published by the RSF showed him in its custody in Nyala, South Darfur. His detention drew responses from the Committee to Protect Journalists (CPJ), the International Press Institute (IPI), Reporters Without Borders, and the International Federation for Human Rights (FIDH), which called for his release.
