= Human trafficking in Sudan =

Sudan ratified the 2000 UN TIP (Trafficking in Persons) Protocol in December 2014.

Sudan is a source country for men, women and children trafficked internally for the purposes of forced labor and sexual exploitation. Sudan is also a transit and destination country for Ethiopian women trafficked abroad for domestic servitude. Sudanese women and girls are trafficked within the country, as well as possibly to Middle Eastern countries such as Qatar, for domestic servitude.

The U.S. State Department's Office to Monitor and Combat Trafficking in Persons placed the country in "Tier 3" in 2017. In 2020, Sudan was once again placed in the "Tier 3" category, since the latest Trafficking in Persons report showed that South Sudan had not made any prosecutions of human traffickers or convicted any individuals in connection with forced conscription of children into the armed forces in the last 5 years.

The country was placed at Tier 2 in 2023. Tier 2 countries are "countries whose governments do not fully comply with the TVPA’s minimum standards, but are making significant efforts to bring themselves into compliance with those standards".

== History ==
In 2007, Greek law enforcement authorities identified a female sex trafficking victim from Sudan. The terrorist rebel organization, Lord's Resistance Army (LRA), continues to harbor small numbers of Sudanese and Ugandan children in the southern part of the country for use as cooks, porters, and combatants; some of these children are also trafficked across borders into Uganda or the Democratic Republic of the Congo.

In March 2007, six Sudanese girls were abducted by the LRA near Maridi, Western Equatoria. Sudanese children are unlawfully conscripted, at times through abduction, and utilized by armed rebel groups—including all SLA factions, the Popular Defense Forces, Janjaweed militia, and Chadian opposition forces—in Sudan's ongoing conflict in Darfur; the Sudanese Armed Forces and associated militias also continue to exploit young children in this region.

There were confirmed reports of unlawful child recruitment in mid-2007 by the Justice and Equality Movement (JEM) Peace Wing among communities of internally displaced persons in Dereig, South Darfur. Militia groups in Darfur, some of which are linked to the government, abduct women for short periods of forced labor and to perpetrate sexual violence.

Forcible recruitment of adults and particularly children by virtually all armed groups involved in Sudan's concluded north–south civil war was commonplace; thousands of children still associated with these forces await demobilization and reintegration into their communities of origin.

In addition to the exploitation of children by armed groups during the two decades-long north–south civil war, thousands of Dinka women and children were abducted and subsequently enslaved by members of the Missiriya and Rezeigat tribes during this time. An unknown number of children from the Nuba tribe were similarly abducted and enslaved.

A portion of those who were abducted and enslaved remained with their abductors in South Darfur and West Kordofan and experienced varying types of treatment; others were sold or given to third parties, including in other regions of the country; and some ultimately escaped from their captors. While there have been no known new abductions of Dinka by members of Baggara tribes in the last few years, intertribal abductions continue in southern Sudan, especially in Jonglei and Eastern Equatoria states.

The Government of National Unity of Sudan does not fully comply with the minimum standards for the elimination of trafficking and is not making significant efforts to do so. While the government did take limited steps to demobilize child soldiers, combating human trafficking through law enforcement or prevention measures was not a priority for the government in 2007.

In December 2013, violence and conflict emerged after a political struggle between Salva Kiir and Riek Machar, which led to armed groups targeting civilians, committing rape and sexual violence, destroying villages and properties, and recruiting children into their ranks. The first step to ending the civil war was the signing of a peace agreement in August 2015, which led to violent outbreaks in 2016, as Machar returned to his position as vice president. Five years later, Kiir and Machar attended negotiations mediated by Uganda and Sudan in June 2018, which led to both signing the Khartoum Declaration of Agreement a month later, leading to a cease-fire and pledge to implement a power-sharing agreement to end the war. The Revitalized Agreement on the Resolution of the Conflict in South Sudan was signed in August 2018, and included a new power-sharing structure.

During the civil war that started in 2023, women and female children were at a higher risk to be sold into slavery and trafficked for child marriage and sexual exploitation.

== Prosecution ==
The government's anti-trafficking law enforcement efforts were negligible during the reporting period; it did not investigate or prosecute any suspected trafficking cases. Sudan is a large country with porous borders and destitute hinterlands; the national government has little ability to establish authority or a law enforcement presence in many regions. Sudan's criminal code does not prohibit all forms of trafficking in persons, though its Articles 162, 163, and 164, criminalize abduction, luring, and forced labor, respectively.

The Interim National Constitution prohibits slavery and forced labor. No trafficker has ever been prosecuted under these articles. In 2007, the Council of Ministers approved the Child Protection Act, which prohibits the recruitment or enlistment of soldiers under the age of 18; the act must be approved by the parliament before it can be implemented.

The draft Sudan Armed Forces Act, which was expected to be debated in the National Assembly in October 2006, was returned to the Council of Ministers for review. The bill prescribes criminal penalties for persons who recruit children under 18 years of age, as well as for a range of human rights violations, including abduction and enslavement.

In June 2007, Southern Sudan's Child Protection Act of 2006, which prohibits the recruitment of children, passed its first reading in the Southern Sudan Assembly and is now in its second reading. The government does not document or track anti-trafficking law enforcement efforts; nor does it provide specialized anti-trafficking training to law enforcement, prosecutorial, and judicial personnel.

The 2008 South Sudan's Child Act defines a child to be anyone under 18, and protects children from having to serve with the police, prison, or military forces. The act states the possible penalties for recruitment or use of a child in an armed force to be an imprisonment tern not exceeding ten years, a fine, or both. A person has to be a minimum of 18 years of age to be eligible for enlistment according to the 2009 South Sudan's SPLA Act. The Ministry of Defense's legal advisory office recommended in September 2014 that possible punishments for child recruitment and occupation of schools and hospitals should be added to the SPLA Act.

In 2017, the government's Judicial and Legal Sciences Institute, together with the Ministry of Justice, partnered with an international organization to provide four five-day trainings titled "Strengthening the Capacity of the Criminal Justice System in Sudan to Address Human Trafficking" for law enforcement officers, judges, prosecutors, defense lawyers, and social workers across eight of Sudan's 18 states. In August that same year, various representatives from the judiciary, Criminal Prosecution Office, Office of the Attorney General, law enforcement branches, Ministry of Justice, and social workers worked together to develop the training curriculum for a trainer-of-trainers model to help in the early identification and prosecution of human trafficking cases under the 2014 Anti-Trafficking law.

Also in 2017, the Ministry of Interior launched the Regional Operational Centre on Trafficking (ROCK), together with the African Union and a multilateral organization, to help facilitate international trafficking investigations between source, transit, and destination countries along commonly used trafficking routes. International donors have pledged support for the ROCK.

In 2019, the government reported that no investigations, prosecutions or convictions of traffickers were carried out by law enforcement for the eighth consecutive year.

== Protection ==
Sudan's Government of National Unity (GNU) made only minimal efforts to protect victims of trafficking and focused primarily on the demobilization of child soldiers during the last year. The government continued to have funding and capacity gaps in its own entities involved in combating trafficking, and the GNU continued to demonstrate extremely low levels of cooperation with humanitarian workers in the Darfur region on a broad spectrum of issues, including human trafficking.

In 2006, the GNU and the Government of Southern Sudan (GoSS) passed legislation formally establishing the National Disarmament, Demobilization, and Reintegration (DDR) Commission, and its Northern and Southern components—the Northern Sudan DDR Commission (NSDDRC), and the Southern Sudan DDR Commission (SSDDRC), respectively. During the period, disarmament, demobilization, and reintegration commissions were established in the northern cities of Nyala, Geneina, and El Fasher, and provided with staff.

However, while the training of staff in child protection and the demobilization and reintegration of children began, the work of these commissions cannot commence in the absence of a clear agreement between the GNU and armed groups as to how to proceed. In 2007, the NSDDRC demobilized 283 children serving with the Sudan People's Liberation Army (SPLA) in South Kordofan.

The NSDDRC also facilitated cross-border return to Bentiu of child soldiers demobilized from the SPLA. The staff of the SSDDRC grew to 225 people in 2007 and representatives were posted to all southern states.

In contrast to the previous reporting period, SSDDRC staff received salaries and training on child protection, demobilization, reintegration, and family tracing. The SSDDRC, with the coordination of and assistance from UNICEF, demobilized approximately 1,000 child soldiers, including girls, between 2006 and 2007, with 1,500 remaining, including 227 at an SPLA camp in Southern Blue Nile.

The SSDDRC continued to register child soldiers throughout the year and coordinated with the NSDDRC to trace and reunify them with their families. The Committee for the Eradication of Abduction of Women and Children (CEAWC), established in 1999 to facilitate the safe return of abducted women and children to their families, was not operational during the majority of the reporting period.

Before March 2008, its most recent retrieval and transport missions took place in January–February 2006; since that time, neither the GNU nor the GoSS provided CEAWC with the necessary funding for the transport and reunification of previously identified abductees with their families.

However, in early March 2008, the GoSS provided CEAWC with $1 million to resume its program; soon after, CEAWC negotiated the release of 95 individuals in the Nyala region and 71 individuals in the Ed Daein region of South Darfur from their abductors, and transported them to transit centers.

However, the return process was fraught with serious protection concerns. Reports indicate that CEAWC's community workers regularly denied social workers from the State Ministries of Social Welfare access to those arriving at the transit centers, and prevented United Nations (UN) staff from interviewing new arrivals, visiting the transit centers, and viewing convoy departure manifests.

CEAWC arranged convoys to transport released abductees to the south, but failed to provide access to sufficient food and water. In addition, CEAWC made no preparation to provide for the basic needs or shelter of the former abductees after their arrival in southern Sudan; lacks a mechanism to conduct family tracing or reintegrate abductees into their former communities; and does not follow up with the abductees after their return to assess their well-being or the success of their integration.

In April 2007, the Governments of Sudan and the United Arab Emirates (U.A.E.) signed a Memorandum of Understanding to establish claims facilities to compensate Sudanese children who worked as camel jockeys in the U.A.E. for their injuries. In June 2007, three child camel jockeys were repatriated from the U.A.E and received by their extended families.

In January 2007, the Khartoum State Police established a child and family protection unit with the support of UNICEF. The unit, which offers various services such as legal aid and psychosocial support, assisted more than 400 child victims of abuse and sexual violence and could potentially provide these services to trafficking victims. Similar units are slated to open in Western Darfur, Ghedaref, and Kassala States.

The government increased efforts in 2017, reporting 400 potential trafficking victims, an increase from the previous year's 142 identified, but lacked in the areas of identification and referral to protective services.

In 2019, government officials cooperated with members of the National Disarmament, Demobilization, and Reintegration Commission to demobilize and release 286 child soldiers.

== Prevention ==
The government made limited efforts to prevent future incidences of trafficking during the reporting period. The National Council on Child Welfare collaborated with UNICEF to launch a comprehensive child protection awareness campaign in North Kordofan as part of the celebration of the June 2007 Day of the African Child.

Aiming to create a much greater community response to grave child rights violations, the campaign was also launched in Darfur, Eastern Sudan, Khartoum, and the three areas, and consists of messages on a number of child protection issues, including unlawful child recruitment and sexual and gender-based violence.

In the 2018 Trafficking in Persons Report (TIP), the government of Sudan proved to have increased efforts to prevent trafficking, but existing Sudanese policies increased the exploitation risks among vulnerable populations. A policy put into place in 2016 required South Sudanese immigrants to formally register within a week of arriving to Sudan, the policy however restricted those immigrants the access to legal work and possibly exposed them to exploitative work situations.

Again in 2019, the government increased efforts to prevent trafficking, and signed an action plan for the prevention of all violations against children in February 2020.
