= Emergency Response Rooms =

Community-led humanitarian organisation in Sudan

- غرف الطوارئ
- Khartoum State ERR’s logo
- Abbreviation: ERRs
- Formation: April 2023; 3 years ago
- Type: Grassroots Aid Network (NGO)
- Legal status: Unregistered
- Purpose: Humanitarian aid
- Region served: Sudan
- Spokesperson: Mukhtar Atif (Bahri); Ahmed Mustafa
- ECO: Hajooj Kuka
- Affiliations: Sudanese resistance committees Sudan Doctors' Syndicate
- Volunteers: 4,600 (2024)
- Website: Khartoum State ERRs

The Emergency Response Rooms (ERRs) (Arabic: غرف الطوارئ) in Sudan, a community-led initiative formed by the resistance committees behind the 2019 revolution, have played a crucial role in providing humanitarian aid during the Sudanese civil war between the Sudanese Armed Forces and the Rapid Support Forces, which began in April 2023. As of December 2024, ERRs had assisted over 11.5 million people, evacuating thousands and supplying essential resources like clean water and medical supplies.

Despite being targeted and facing violence, ERRs remain a symbol of decolonised aid, funded by communities and external donors. Their efforts have been praised by the European Union and, the initiative was nominated for the 2025 Nobel Peace Prize by the Peace Research Institute Oslo.

== History ==
The Emergency Response Rooms (ERRs) in Sudan is a community-led initiative that emerged from the Sudanese resistance committees which spearheaded the 2019 revolution. "Rooms" in ERRs refers to WhatsApp group chats that are used to communicate between the different groups to provide humanitarian aid. ERRs have played a vital role in humanitarian efforts amid the ongoing Sudanese civil war between the Sudanese Armed Forces and the Rapid Support Forces, which started on 15 April 2023.

As of December 2024, ERRs have provided help for more than 11.5 millions. These volunteers have successfully evacuated tens of thousands of people from conflict zones, provided essential services such as clean water and medical supplies, and have kept the few operational hospitals stocked with necessary fuel and supplies. In addition to these efforts, ERRs have maintained vital water and communication infrastructure, ensuring that communities remain connected and have access to clean water.

They also run community kitchens or takaya (Arabic: تكايا) that feed millions of people, addressing the severe food shortages caused by the conflict. EERs has also been active in responding to sexual violence cases during the civil war.

In a statement by the office of the High Representative of the Union for Foreign Affairs and Security Policy on 12 April 2024, the European Union "applauds the bravery and commitment of local and international humanitarian workers, particularly local NGOs and Emergency Response Rooms".

Most ERRs are not legally registered. ERRs are community funded but also receives funds from Non-governmental organization, international development agencies, charities, individuals, and local businesses. Nonetheless, in a press release in April 2024, U.S. representative for Minnesota's 5th congressional district Ilhan Omar stated that there is a "need to significantly ramp up direct funding for Emergency Response Rooms – not only providing essential services but demonstrating our commitment to supporting civilian rule in Sudan." In October 2024, the Peace Research Institute Oslo nominated ERRs for the 2025 Nobel Peace Prize.

ERRs have faced significant challenges, including being targeted by both sides of the civil war, including arrest and abduction, rape, and killing. For example, three ERRs volunteers were killed in 2023 while trying to assist civilians in Al Fiteihab, Khartoum, and two more were killed in Naivasha Market.

ERRs is considered as an example of the decolonisation of aid. The decolonisation of aid refers to efforts to transform the international aid system by addressing and dismantling the power imbalances and colonial legacies that have historically shaped it.

In 2025, the ERRs received the Thorolf Rafto Memorial Prize, Right Livelihood Award, and Chatham House Prize for their role in "building a resilient model of mutual aid" amid the ongoing civil war.

In 2026 the ERRs was awarded the Balzan Prize for Humanity, Peace, and Fraternity among Peoples.

== Nafir ==
The Emergency Response Rooms are rooted in nafir, also spelled as nafeer, or referred to as El-Nafir. It is a Sudanese tradition and a deeply rooted cultural practice, loosely translated as a "call to mobilize". According to an ERRs spokesperson, Alsanosi Adam, nafir can also be described as “one for all, all for one.” The term refers to a form of social mobilization within local communities, through which people organize to provide mutual assistance and care.
